= Georgia State Route 20 =

State highway in Georgia

State Route 20
- Georgia State Route 20 highlighted in red

Route information
- Maintained by GDOT
- Length: 166.31 mi (267.65 km)
- Existed: 1929–present

Major junctions
- West end: SR 9 at the Alabama state line west of Coosa
- US 27 / US 411 / SR 1 / SR 53 in Rome; US 41 / US 411 / SR 61 in Cartersville; I-75 north of Cartersville; I-575 / SR 5 in Canton; US 19 / SR 400 in Cumming; I-985 / US 23 / SR 13 / SR 365 in Buford; I-85 south of Buford; I-20 / US 278 / SR 12 in Conyers; I-75 west of McDonough; US 19 / US 41 / SR 3 in Hampton
- East end: Lower Woolsey Road southwest of Hampton

Location
- Country: United States
- State: Georgia
- Counties: Floyd, Bartow, Cherokee, Forsyth, Gwinnett, Walton, Rockdale, Newton, Henry

Highway system
- Georgia State Highway System; Interstate; US; State; Special
← I-20	→ SR 21

State Route 20 (SR 20) is a 166.31-mile-long (267.65 km) state highway roughly in the shape of a capital J rotated ninety degrees to the left, which travels through portions of Floyd, Bartow, Cherokee, Forsyth, Gwinnett, Walton, Rockdale, Newton, and Henry counties in the northwestern and north-central parts of the U.S. state of Georgia. Its counterclockwise, or western terminus is at the Alabama state line in Floyd County, and its clockwise, or eastern terminus occurs at its interchange with Lower Woolsey Road southwest of Hampton in Henry County south-southeast of the Atlanta Motor Speedway.

== Route description ==
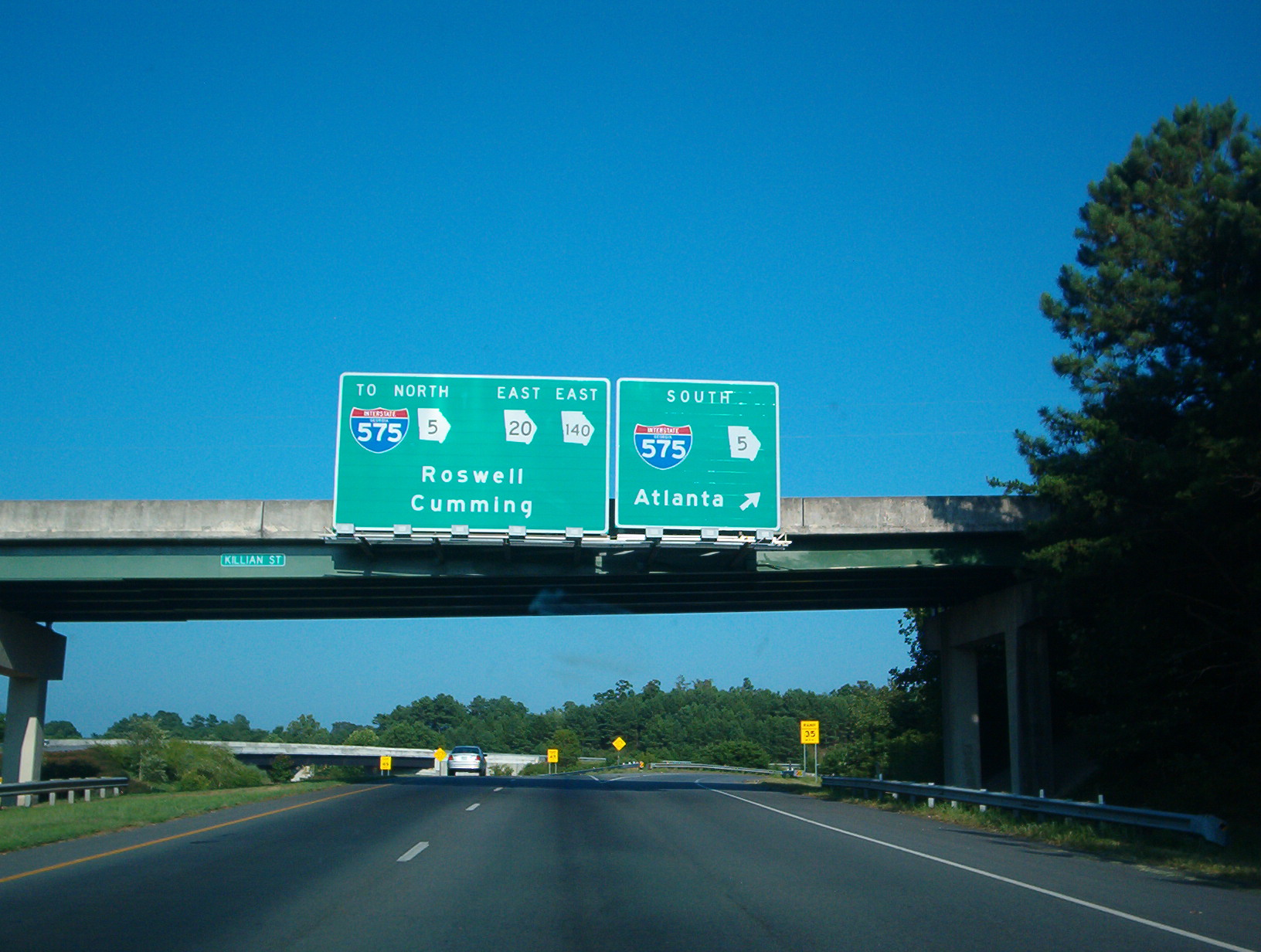
Overhead signage for SR 20 and SR 140 in Canton

From the Alabama state line, SR 20 proceeds east through central Floyd County into the city of Rome, and is concurrent with US 27, SR 1, and SR 53 through downtown Rome. The highway leaves Rome to the east, concurrent with US 411, bisecting Floyd County, and then enters and bisects Bartow County, still concurrent with US 411 until just north of Cartersville (US 41 is briefly concurrent in Cartersville as well), after which SR 20 continues eastward on its own. The highway intersects I-75 north of Cartersville, and continues to head east, passing Lake Allatoona to its north, and entering Cherokee County. SR 20 heads east into central Cherokee County and through its county seat in Canton, and has a brief concurrency with I-575/SR 5, before continuing east into Forsyth County. In central Forsyth County, the highway dips southeast to pass to the south of Sawnee Mountain and heads through Cumming, crossing US 19 and SR 400, and heading on into Gwinnett County, passing to the south of Lake Lanier. SR 20 then turns south after an interchange with I-985/US 23/SR 365, crossing I-85 shortly thereafter. The road also provides access to SR 316, which leads to Athens.

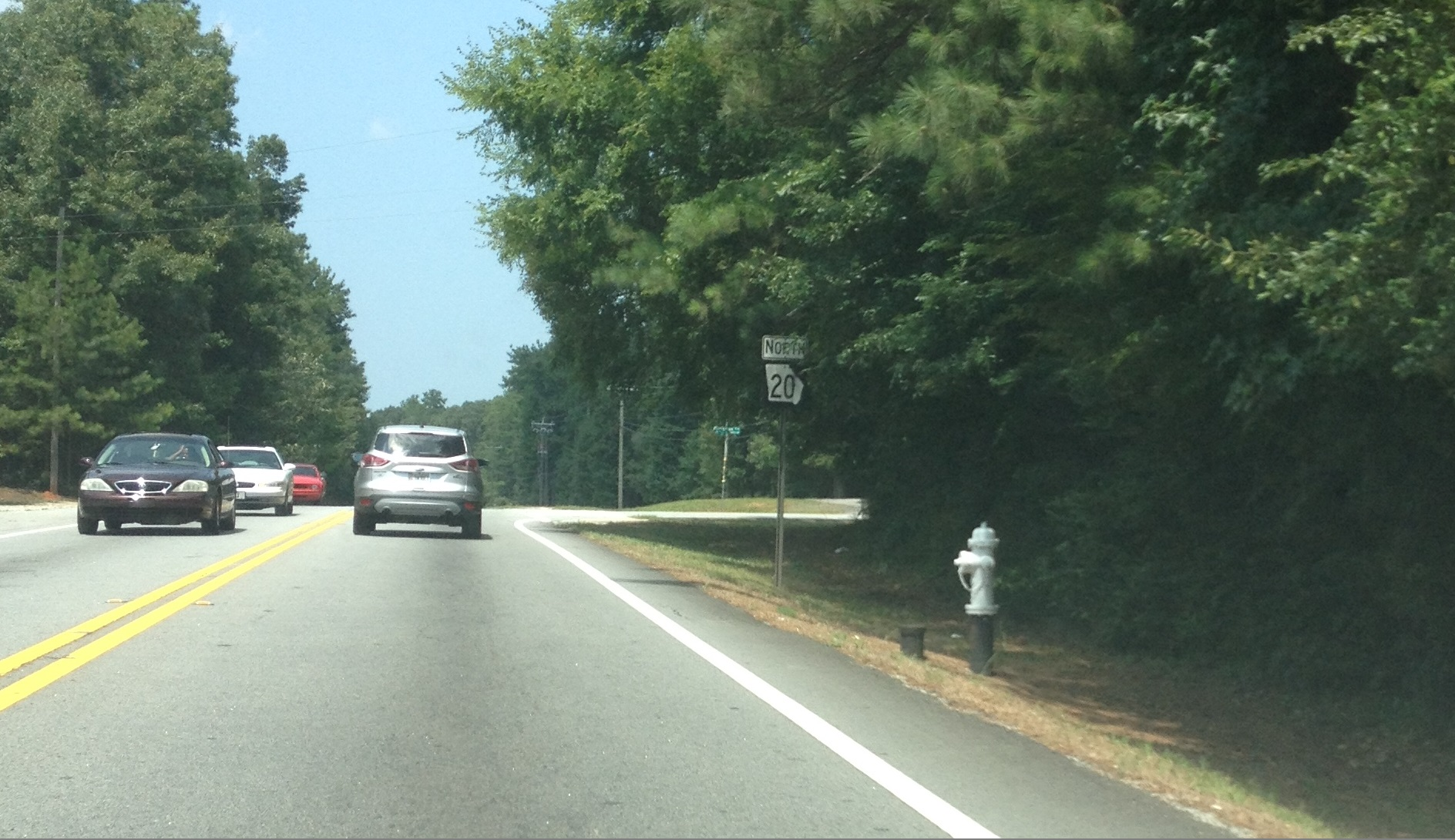
SR 20 just south of Conyers

SR 20 continues southward through Lawrenceville and heads through Loganville into Walton County and paralleling the Gwinnett–Walton County line, before crossing into Rockdale County and meeting I-20/US 278/SR 12 in Conyers. Likely to help alleviate driver confusion due to two identically-numbered highways meeting, the highway is usually referred to at this point as SR 138, with which it travels concurrent through Conyers. SR 20 continues south and then southwest to the Henry County seat of McDonough, where it briefly travels concurrent with SR 81. SR 81 departs to the west after the highways cross I-75 at exit 218. The portion of SR 20 between the western end of the SR 81 concurrency and Lower Woolsey Road, the highway's clockwise/eastern terminus, was widened in the early 2000s from two lanes to four, including a new southern bypass of the city of Hampton, and more controlled access at US 19/US 41. The primary purpose of the widening has been to facilitate the flow of traffic to and from the Atlanta Motor Speedway located near the highway's clockwise terminus.

=== Traffic ===
The Georgia Department of Transportation average annual daily traffic (AADT) numbers for the year 2011 show a variety of daily averages across SR 20. The traffic load on the highway starts at its lowest daily average load as the route starts into Floyd County, where numbers hover around 5,400 vehicles per day. These averages increase rapidly as the highway approaches Rome, going from around 12,000 vehicles to a peak of 38,000 vehicles in downtown Rome. As SR 20 becomes concurrent with US 27/SR 1, the numbers decrease to an average of 32,000, and then decrease more rapidly to around 15,000 as SR 20 heads east out of Rome. The vehicle load stays in that area all the way through Floyd County and into Bartow County, as the highway is the main west-to-east thoroughfare between Rome and Cartersville. In Cartersville, where the highway is concurrent with US 41, the vehicle count reaches a zenith of just over 41,000, but then drops off sharply as the highway heads into rural Cherokee County, dipping just below 10,000 before increasing again to near 24,000 vehicles per day as it approaches I-575/SR 5. On the portion of the highway that is concurrent with I-575/SR 5, the highway sees its maximum vehicle load of just over 54,000 vehicles, again dropping rapidly east of I-575/SR 5, going from around 24,000 down to 11,000, and further down to around 10,000 as the Forsyth County line is reached.

Numbers start to creep up again as the Forsyth county seat of Cumming approaches, going from 10,000 to over 22,000 vehicles, cresting at 37,000 vehicles south of Cumming, as the route feeds traffic onto US 19/SR 400 southbound into Atlanta. Averages stabilize around 20,000 vehicles per day as SR 20 heads into Gwinnett County, briefly cresting again at over 41,000 vehicles around I-985, and dipping to around 30,000 vehicles around I-85. South of Lawrenceville, numbers then start to decrease once more from around 22,000 down to 14,000 around Loganville, and dip down into average of just over 8,000 in rural Walton County. Until the highway reaches Conyers, average numbers see lows of 6,800 in Rockdale County, increasing again to just over 31,000 in and around Conyers and I-20. Rapidly decreasing once more to around 7,600 vehicles per day in Newton and northern Henry counties, another high is reached in the vicinity of I-75 with just over 28,000 vehicles per day. At its clockwise terminus in Hampton average traffic loads are measured at just over 12,000 vehicles per day.

=== National Highway System ===
The following portions of SR 20 are part of the National Highway System, a system of routes determined to be the most important for the nation's economy, mobility, and defense:

- From its western terminus at the Alabama state line to SR 124 in Lawrenceville
- From its intersection with Sigman Road NE to its interchange with I-20 in Conyers
- From I-75 in McDonough to its eastern terminus southwest of Hampton

== History ==
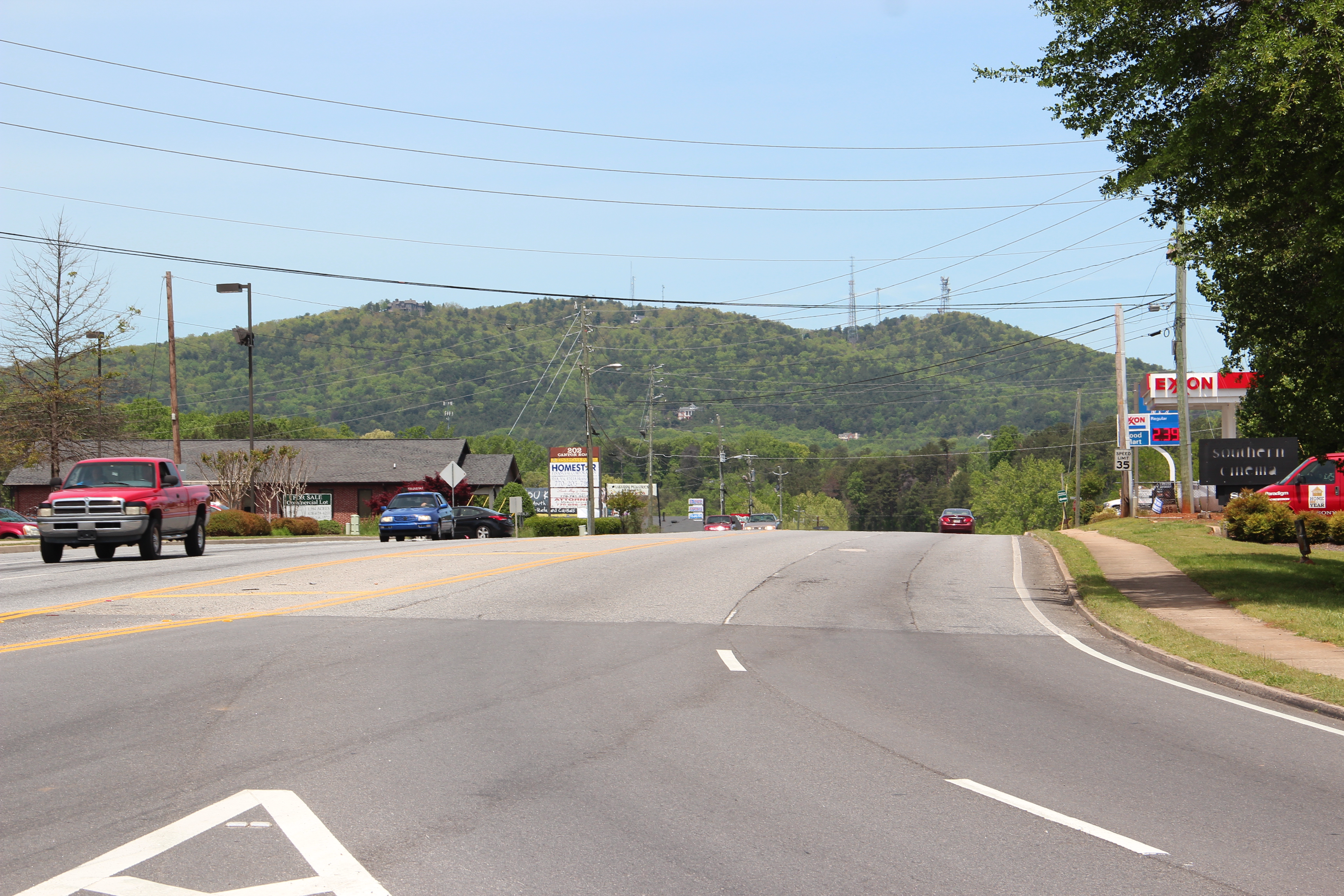
State Route 20 in Cumming, with Sawnee Mountain in the background

=== 1920s ===
The highway that would eventually become SR 20 was established at least as early as 1919 as the entire length of SR 4 from the Alabama state line to Cartersville, an unnumbered road from Cumming to Buford, part of SR 13 from Buford to Lawrenceville, and part of SR 45 from Lawrenceville to Loganville. By the end of 1921, SR 68 was established on the current path of SR 20 from Cumming to Buford. Also, SR 45 between Lawrenceville and Loganville was redesignated as part of SR 13. By the end of 1926, two segments had a "sand clay or top soil" surface: from the Alabama state line to just west of Rome and from Sugar Hill to Lawrenceville. The highway in the vicinity of Rome had a "completed hard surface". A portion of the highway from just east of Rome to a point northwest of Cartersville was under construction. In the northwestern part of Cartersville and farther to the west, a portion of the highway had a completed semi hard surface. Within three years, all of SR 4 was redesignated as part of SR 20, with US 41W designated on the Rome–Cartersville segment. US 19 was designated on the Buford–Lawrenceville segment. The portion of the highway at the Alabama state line had a completed semi hard surface. The portion of the highway just east of Rome had a completed hard surface. The highway was under construction northwest of Cartersville.

=== 1930s ===
By the middle of 1930, SR 20 was established from SR 61 in Rydal to SR 5 in Canton. The entire Rome–Cartersville and Buford–Lawrenceville segments had a completed hard surface. Also, SR 53 was designated from the Alabama state line to Rome, farther to the north than SR 20. Later that year, the portion of SR 20 and SR 53 west of Rome were swapped. By the beginning of 1932, US 19 was shifted farther to the west and off of the current SR 20 between Buford and Lawrenceville; at the same time, US 23 was designated on this same segment. In January 1932, SR 20 was established from Canton to Cumming. SR 68, from Cumming to Buford, was decommissioned and redesignated as part of SR 20. Also, since SR 13 was shifted to a more western alignment, its segment from Buford to Lawrenceville was also redesignated as part of SR 20. A few months later, SR 20 was established from Loganville to Conyers. Nearly a year later, SR 20 was established from Conyers to McDonough. The next month, the western part of the segment from the Alabama state line to Rome was under construction. Later that year, SR 20 was designated along SR 61 from Cartersville to Rydal, with the entire length having a sand clay or top soil surface. Also, a portion of the highway east of Canton was under construction. Before the year ended, US 41W between Rome and Cartersville was redesignated as part of US 411, which was also designated along SR 20/SR 61 from Cartersville to Rydal. At this time, the Rockdale County portion of the segment between Loganville and Conyers was under construction. By the middle of 1935, the western half of the Canton–Cumming segment was under construction. By October of that year, a small portion east of Canton had a sand clay or top soil surface. At the end of the year, a small portion north-northeast of Cartersville, as well as a small portion north-northeast of Conyers, had a completed hard surface. Later in 1936, the central portion of the SR 20/SR 61 segment, from Cartersville to Rydal, had completed grading, but was not surfaced. A few months later, a small portion south-southwest of Rydal had a completed hard surface. The entire Forsyth County portion of the Canton–Cumming segment, except for the eastern end, was under construction. Also, the entire Gwinnett County portion of the Cumming–Buford segment had completed grading, but was not surfaced. By the middle of the year, the central portion of SR 20/SR 61, from Cartersville to Rydal, had a completed hard surface. Also, the eastern three-fourths of the Canton–Cumming segment was under construction. A few months later, the western third of this segment had a completed hard surface, while the eastern third of it had completed grading, but was not surfaced. The northern half of the segment between Lawrenceville and Loganville, and nearly the entire northern half of the segment between Conyers and McDonough, also had completed grading, but was not surfaced. About two years later, US 23 was shifted farther to the west and off of SR 20's path. Also, a small portion northeast of Buford had a sand clay or top soil surface. Before the year ended, about half of the total length of the segment from the Alabama state line and Rome had a completed hard surface.

=== 1940s ===
Toward the end of 1940, the western portion of this segment, as well as the entire Rockdale County portion of the Conyers–McDonough segment, had a completed hard surface. Later that year, SR 20 Spur was built in the northern portion of Cartersville from US 41/US 411/SR 3/SR 20 to US 411/SR 20/SR 61. At this time, SR 113 was established from US 411/SR 20/SR 61 in the northern portion of Cartersville to SR 5 in the southern portion of Canton. In 1941, the western and eastern termini of SR 113 had completed grading, but were not surfaced. The next year, SR 113 was truncated to Cartersville, its former path was redesignated as part of SR 20. With the highway being shifted southward, its former path between Rydal and Canton became part of SR 140. In 1943, SR 20 Spur in the northern part of Cartersville was redesignated as part of the SR 20 mainline. By the end of 1946, three segments were hard surfaced: Alabama state line to Rome, Cumming to Buford, and Lawrenceville to Loganville. Between 1946 and the beginning of 1948, the Canton–Cumming segment, and a portion north-northeast of Conyers, were both hard surfaced. At this time SR 20 Spur was established in Loganville.

=== 1950s ===
Before the third quarter of 1950 ended, a portion of the highway northeast of Cartersville was hard surfaced. By the end of 1951, the southern half of the segment from Loganville to Conyers, and a portion northeast of McDonough, had been hard surfaced. In 1952, an unnumbered road was built from SR 81 west-southwest of McDonough to US 19/US 41/SR 3 in Hampton. The next year, a small portion of SR 20 in the northern part of Cartersville, a portion of it west of Canton, and the entire Rockdale County portion were hard surfaced. At this time, SR 294N was built, with a hard surface, northeast of Cartersville. At this time, SR 20 Conn. was built, from SR 20 in Sugar Hill, to US 23/SR 13 south of Buford. In 1954, the entire Walton County portion of the highway was hard surfaced. SR 20 Conn. was redesignated as part of the SR 20 mainline. In 1955, it was reverted to being designated as SR 20 Conn., with the western part paved. A few years later, all portions of SR 20 that had been built were paved. At this time, SR 294 had been redesignated as the SR 294 mainline. By 1960, SR 20 was extended west-southwest from McDonough along SR 81, and then on a previously unnumbered road to US 19/US 41/SR 3 in Hampton. The entire length of this extension was paved.

=== 1960s ===
Between 1960 and 1963, US 411 between Rome and Cartersville was shifted on a more southerly routing, concurrent with SR 344; SR 20 remained on the old alignment. By 1966, SR 294 had been reverted to being designated as SR 294N. SR 20 Conn. had been decommissioned and redesignated as the SR 20 mainline again. In 1966, SR 20 Spur was designated from SR 20 in Sugar Hill to SR 13 Spur in Buford.

=== Later years ===
The highway stayed about the same until 1977, when SR 344 was decommissioned. SR 20 was shifted onto US 411 between Rome and Cartersville. SR 20's old alignment was redesignated as part of SR 293. A few years later, SR 20 Spur in Loganville was decommissioned and redesignated as part of SR 81. A decade later, SR 20 Spur in Buford was also decommissioned. In the middle of the decade, SR 294N was decommissioned again and redesignated as SR 20 Spur. In the mid-2000s, SR 20 was extended to Lower Woolsey Road southwest of Hampton. In 2024, the highway's concurrency with US 29 / SR 8 through Lawrenceville was removed when US 29 / SR 8 was realigned to bypass the city along SR 316 and Lawrenceville–Suwanee Road.

== Major intersections ==
County	Location	mi	km	Destinations	Notes
Floyd		0.000	0.000	SR 9 south – Centre	Western terminus; continuation into Alabama as AL SR 9
Floyd		3.642	5.861	SR 100 north – Summerville	Western end of SR 100 concurrency
Floyd	Coosa	6.580	10.589	SR 100 south – Cave Springs	Eastern end of SR 100 concurrency
Floyd		8.796	14.156	West Rome Bypass south	Northern terminus of West Rome Bypass; former SR 746
Floyd	Rome	14.152	22.775	SR 1 Loop south (Redmond Circle) – Berry College, Baseball Stadium	Northern terminus of SR 1 Loop
Floyd	Rome	17.110	27.536	US 27 north / SR 1 north / SR 101 south (Martha Berry Boulevard) – Summerville, Rockmart, Berry College, Airport	Western end of US 27/SR 1 concurrency; northern terminus of SR 101
Floyd	Rome	18.164	29.232	SR 293 south (Broad Street) – Kingston	Northern terminus of SR 293
Floyd	Rome	18.233	29.343	SR 53 east (MLK Boulevard) – Calhoun, Shannon	Western end of SR 53 concurrency
Floyd	Rome	19.565	31.487	SR 101 (East 2nd Avenue) / East 12th Street – Rockmart	Interchange
Floyd	Rome	20.416	32.856	US 27 south / US 411 south / SR 1 south / SR 53 west – Cedartown, Gadsden	Eastern end of US 27/SR 1 and SR 53 concurrencies; western end of US 411 concurrency; interchange
Floyd	Rome	20.510	33.008	SR 101 (Dean Avenue) – Rockmart	Westbound exit and eastbound entrance; interchange
Floyd	Rome	22.728	36.577	SR 1 Loop north to SR 293 – Calhoun, Summerville, Baseball Stadium, Chieftains Museum Major Ridge Home, National Guard Armory, Rome High School, Berry College	Southern terminus of SR 1 Loop
Bartow		39.040	62.829	US 41 north / SR 3 north – Adairsville, Calhoun, Kingston	Western end of US 41/SR 3 concurrency; interchange
Bartow	Cartersville	42.294	68.066	US 41 south / SR 3 south / SR 61 south (Tennessee Street) – Emerson, Kennesaw, Dallas	Eastern end of US 41/SR 3 concurrency; western end of SR 61 concurrency; interchange
Bartow	Cartersville	42.783	68.853	US 411 north / SR 61 north (Tennessee Street) to I-75 (SR 401) – Fairmount, Chatsworth	Eastern end of US 411 and SR 61 concurrencies
Bartow		45.062	72.520	I-75 (SR 401) – Chattanooga, Atlanta	I-75/SR 401 exit 290
Bartow		45.236	72.800	SR 20 Spur east	Western terminus of SR 20 Spur
Cherokee	Sutallee	53.915	86.768	SR 108 east – Waleska, Funk Heritage Center, Reinhardt University, Amicalola Falls State Park & Lodge	Western terminus of SR 108
Cherokee	Canton	61.604	99.142	SR 5 Bus. north / SR 140 west (Marietta Highway) – Canton, Reinhardt University	Western end of SR 5 Bus. concurrency
Cherokee	Canton	62.213	100.122	I-575 south / SR 5 south (SR 417 south) / SR 5 Bus. ends – Atlanta	Eastern end of SR 5 Bus. concurrency; southern terminus of SR 5 Bus.; I-575/SR 417 exit 16 (northbound) / 16A (southbound) connects to SR 20 west
Cherokee	Canton	62.436	100.481	SR 140 east – Canton, Roswell	Eastern end of SR 140 concurrency; I-575/SR 417 exit 16B (southbound)
Cherokee	Canton	62.728	100.951	I-575 south / SR 5 south (SR 417 south) – Atlanta	Western end of I-575/SR 5/SR 417 concurrency
Cherokee	Canton	64.410	103.658	I-575 north / SR 5 north (SR 417 north) – Downtown Canton	Eastern end of I-575/SR 5/SR 417 concurrency; SR 20 east follows exit 19A; downtown Canton is exit 19B
Cherokee		73.046	117.556	SR 369 north (Hightower Road) – Gainesville	Southern terminus of SR 369
Cherokee	Free Home	75.536	121.563	SR 372 (Ball Ground Road / Free Home Highway) – Ball Ground, Roswell	
Forsyth		79.339	127.684	Post Road south – Roswell	Former SR 371
Forsyth		81.224	130.717	SR 141 south (Bethelview Road)	Northern terminus of SR 141
Forsyth	Cumming	84.095	135.338	SR 306 east (Sawnee Drive) – Gainesville	Western terminus of SR 306
Forsyth	Cumming	85.646	137.834	SR 9 north (Dahlonega Street / Veterans Memorial Boulevard) – Dawsonville, Gainesville	Western end of SR 9 concurrency
Forsyth		86.945	139.924	SR 9 south (Atlanta Highway) – Roswell, Atlanta	Eastern end of SR 9 concurrency
Forsyth		87.285	140.472	US 19 / SR 400 – Dahlonega, Atlanta	SR 400 exit 14
Gwinnett	Sugar Hill–Buford line	97.598	157.069	US 23 south / SR 13 (Buford Highway) – Buford, Duluth	Western end of US 23 concurrency
Gwinnett	Buford	98.919	159.195	I-985 / US 23 north (SR 365 / SR 419) – Gainesville, Atlanta	Eastern end of US 23 concurrency; I-985/SR 365/SR 419 exit 4
Gwinnett	Buford	99.963	160.875	SR 324 south (Gravel Springs Road)	Northern terminus of SR 324
Gwinnett		101.337	163.086	I-85 (SR 403) – Greenville, Atlanta	I-85/SR 403 exit 115
Gwinnett		106.244	170.983	SR 124 north (Braselton Highway) – Braselton	Western end of SR 124 concurrency
Gwinnett	Lawrenceville	106.951	172.121	US 29 / SR 8 / SR 316 (University Parkway) to I-85 (SR 403) – Atlanta, Athens	Interchange
Gwinnett	Lawrenceville	109.404	176.069	SR 124 south (Scenic Highway) – Braselton, Snellville	Eastern end of SR 124 concurrency
Gwinnett	Grayson	113.503	182.665	SR 84 west (Grayson Parkway)	Eastern terminus of SR 84
Walton	Loganville	118.471	190.661	SR 81 north (Winder Highway) – Winder	Western end of SR 81 concurrency
Walton	Loganville	118.701	191.031	SR 81 south (Lawrenceville Highway) – Covington	Eastern end of SR 81 concurrency
Walton	Loganville	119.127	191.716	US 78 / SR 10 – Monroe, Snellville	
Rockdale	Conyers	134.666	216.724	SR 138 east (Walnut Grove Road) – Monroe	Western end of SR 138 concurrency
Rockdale	Conyers	136.205	219.201	I-20 (SR 402) / US 278 / SR 12 – Augusta, Atlanta	I-20/SR 402 exit 82
Rockdale	Conyers	137.463	221.225	SR 138 west (Stockbridge Highway) – Stockbridge	Eastern end of SR 138 concurrency
Newton		143.758	231.356	SR 212 west – Monastery	Western end of SR 212 concurrency
Newton		143.831	231.474	SR 212 east – Covington, Monticello, Jackson Lake	Eastern end of SR 212 concurrency
Henry	McDonough	154.267	248.269	SR 81 east (Keys Ferry Street / Covington Street) / SR 155 south (Zack Hinton Parkway) to I-75 (SR 401) – Griffin, Hampton	Western end of SR 81 and SR 155 concurrencies
Henry	McDonough	154.429	248.529	SR 155 north (Sims Street) – Decatur	Eastern end of SR 155 concurrency
Henry	McDonough	154.707	248.977	US 23 north / SR 42 north (Macon Street / Lawrenceville Street) – Stockbridge	One-block concurrency with US 23 south/SR 42 south (westbound only)
Henry	McDonough	154.757	249.057	US 23 south / SR 42 south (Griffin Street) to Jonesboro Street / I-75 – Locust Grove, Jackson	One-block concurrency with US 23 south/SR 42 south (westbound only)
Henry	McDonough	157.539	253.534	I-75 (SR 401) – Macon, Atlanta	I-75/SR 401 exit 218
Henry	McDonough	157.799	253.953	SR 81 west (McDonough-Lovejoy Road) – Lovejoy	Eastern end of SR 81 concurrency
Henry	Hampton	165.786	266.807	US 19 / US 41 / SR 3 (Bear Creek Boulevard)	No access from SR 20 to US 19/US 41/SR 3 or from US 19/US 41/SR 3 north to SR 20 east (west direction on compass); no access from US 19/US 41/SR 3 south to SR 20
Henry		166.305	267.642	Lower Woolsey Road to US 19 / US 41 / SR 3 – Hapeville, Griffin, Atlanta Motor Speedway	Eastern terminus
1.000 mi = 1.609 km; 1.000 km = 0.621 mi: Concurrency terminus; Incomplete access

== Cartersville spur route ==
State Route 20 Spur
- Location: Cartersville–Allatoona Dam
- Length: 4.25 mi (6.84 km)

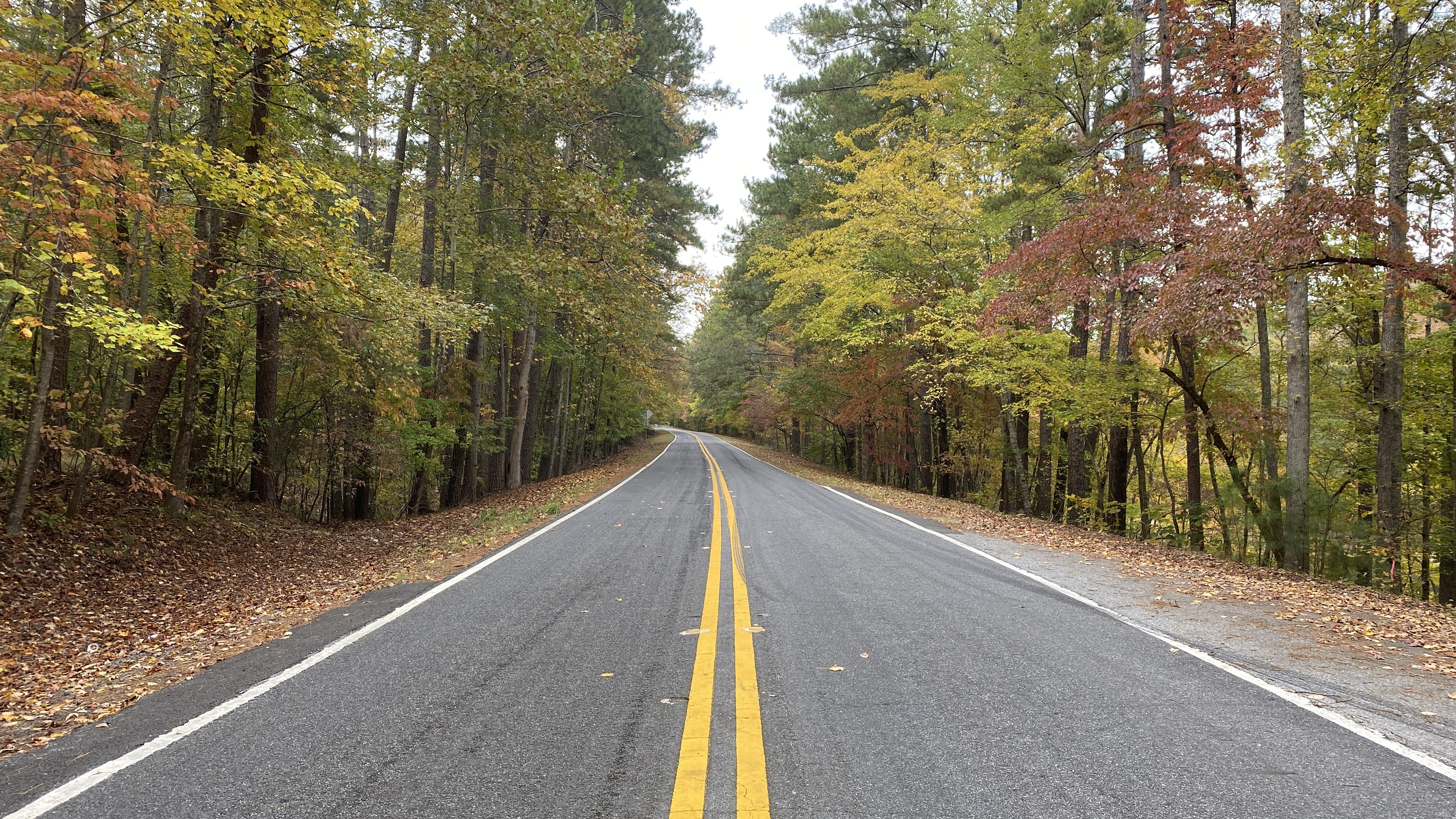
State Route 20 Spur in autumn

State Route 20 Spur (SR 20 Spur) is a 4.25-mile-long (6.84 km) spur route of SR 20. It travels from SR 20, just east of its interchange with Interstate 75 (I-75) north of Cartersville, south to Allatoona Dam. The highway, along with nearby Allatoona Dam road, formed the two segments of State Route 294.

By 1953, SR 20 Spur had been constructed and was signed as SR 294.

The entire route is in Bartow County.

Location	mi	km	Destinations	Notes
Cartersville	0.000	0.000	SR 20 (Canton Highway) – Cartersville, Canton	Western terminus
	4.253	6.845	Allatoona Dam	Eastern terminus
1.000 mi = 1.609 km; 1.000 km = 0.621 mi
