= Georgia State Route 61 =

State highway in Georgia

State Route 61
- SR 61 highlighted in red

Route information
- Maintained by GDOT
- Length: 107.1 mi (172.4 km)
- Existed: 1926–present
- Tourist routes: Cohutta–Chattahoochee Scenic Byway

Major junctions
- South end: SR 166 northeast of Carrollton.
- I-20 / US 78 / SR 8 / SR 101 in Villa Rica; US 278 / SR 6 / SR 6 Bus. / SR 120 in Dallas; US 41 / US 411 / SR 3 / SR 20 in Cartersville; I-75 in Cartersville; US 76 / SR 282 in Ramhurst; US 76 / SR 2 / SR 52 / SR 52 Alt. in Chatsworth
- North end: US 411 / SR 33 Tennessee state line at Tennga

Location
- Country: United States
- State: Georgia
- Counties: Carroll, Douglas, Paulding, Bartow, Gordon, Murray

Highway system
- Georgia State Highway System; Interstate; US; State; Special
← SR 60	→ SR 62

State Route 61 (SR 61) is a 107.1-mile-long (172.4 km) state highway that travels south-to-north through portions of Carroll, Douglas, Paulding, Bartow, Gordon, and Murray counties in the western and northwestern parts of the U.S. state of Georgia. The highway connects the Carrollton area with the Tennessee state line, via Villa Rica, Dallas, Cartersville, and Chatsworth. The portion of the highway from just northeast of Carrollton to Villa Rica was formerly the path of US 78S. When that highway was decommissioned, it was redesignated as US 78 Alternate.

== Route description ==
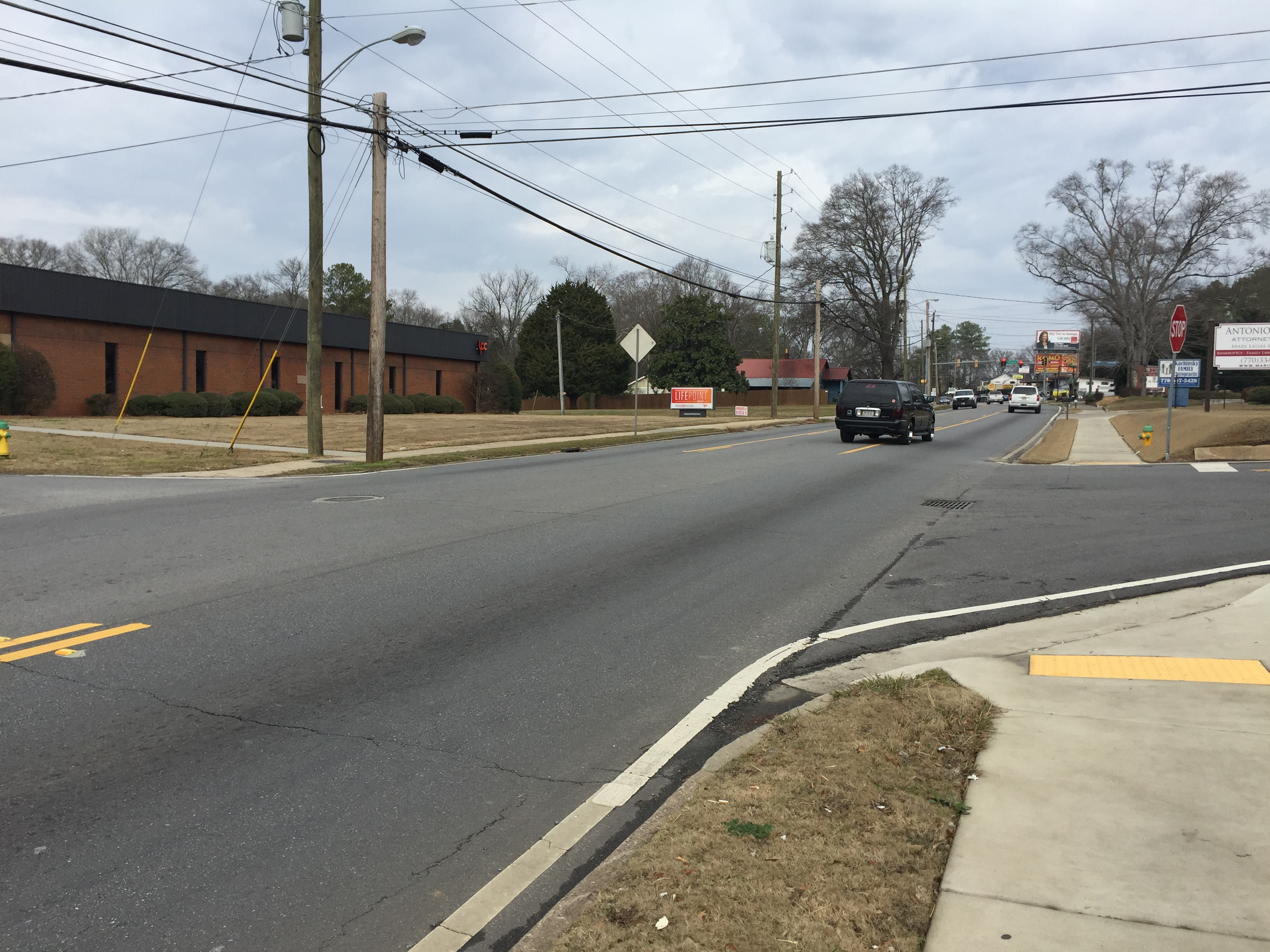
State Route 61 in Cartersville

SR 61 begins at an intersection with SR 166, northeast of Carrollton in Carroll County. It heads north-northeast to the town of Villa Rica. There, it has an interchange with Interstate 20 (Tom Murphy Freeway). This interchange also marks the southern terminus of SR 101. SR 61/SR 101 head north concurrent, to an intersection with US 78/SR 8. At this intersection, SR 101 SR 61 departs while US 78/SR 8 head concurrent to the east. Then SR 61 departs the concurrence with SR 120 on the villa rica bypass then it meets with Dallas hwy and goes north. The highway passes the Mirror Lake Golf Club, cuts across the northwestern corner of Douglas County, and enters Paulding County. In the town of Dallas, it intersects US 278/SR 6/SR 120 (Jimmy Campbell Parkway). The highway heads north on Nathan Dean Boulevard and meets SR 6 Business. SR 6 Business/SR 61 head concurrent to the northwest. Just under 3,000 feet (910 m) later, they meet the southern terminus of SR 381 (East Memorial Drive). Almost immediately, SR 61 departs to the north-northwest, on North Confederate Avenue. It travels through rural areas and crosses into Bartow County. It passes the Cartersville Airport and enters Cartersville. There, it intersects SR 113, which runs concurrent with it into the main part of town. Along the way, they cross over the Etowah River. Also, SR 293 joins the concurrency for a short while. At the end of the concurrency, SR 61 departs to the north, while SR 113 (East Main Street) continues to the east-northeast and SR 293 (South Tennessee Street) heads south. Then, SR 61 has an interchange with US 41/US 411/SR 3/SR 20 (Joe Frank Harris Parkway SE). At this interchange, US 411/SR 20 head concurrent with SR 61 for just over 800 feet (240 m), where SR 20 splits off to the east. US 411/SR 61 head northeast to an interchange with I-75, before leaving Cartersville. They pass through the towns of White and Rydal before intersecting SR 140, just north-northwest of Rydal. Farther to the north-northeast, the concurrency crosses into Gordon County. In the town of Fairmount is a brief concurrency with SR 53. US 411/SR 61 pass through the town of Ranger before meeting the eastern terminus of SR 156. Just before entering Murray County, the concurrency meets an old segment of US 411/SR 61 and intersect SR 136 (Nicklesville Road). Shortly after entering the county, they cross over the Coosawattee River. In the unincorporated community of Ramhurst, they intersect US 76/SR 282. At this intersection, US 76 joins the concurrency, and SR 282 meets its western terminus. US 76/US 411/SR 61 continue to the north-northwest and meet the northern part of the aforementioned stretch of old US 411/SR 61. In Chatsworth, SR 2/SR 52 (East Fort Street) join the concurrency. This intersection also marks the eastern terminus of SR 52 Alternate (West Fort Street). A few miles farther to the north, US 76/SR 52 split off to the west on G.I. Maddox Parkway, while the other three routes continue to the north-northeast. In the town of Eton is the eastern terminus of SR 286. On the way to Cisco, US 411/SR 2/SR 61 pass through Crandall. In Cisco, SR 2 departs to the west. A little ways farther to the north-northeast, they curve to the northwest, pass through the town of Tennga, and curve to the north. On the northern edge of town, they reach the Tennessee state line. Here, SR 61 ends, and US 411 crosses into Tennessee, where Tennessee State Route 33 begins.

The following portions of SR 61 are part of the National Highway System, a system of routes determined to be the most important for the nation's economy, mobility, and defense:

- A brief portion northeast of Carrollton
- From the interchange with US 41/US 411/SR 3/SR 20, in Cartersville, to an indeterminate point in McCallie, just north of I-75
- The entire length of the US 76 concurrency, from a point south-southeast of Chatsworth, to the northeastern part of the city.

== History ==
=== 1920s ===
The roadway that would eventually become SR 61 was designated at least as early as 1919 as SR 36 from northeast of Carrollton to Villa Rica. Also, an unnumbered road was established from Chatsworth to the Tennessee state line in Tennga. By the end of 1921, SR 4's eastern extension was built from Cartersville to Fairmount. Also, the segment of SR 2 between Calhoun and Ellijay was shifted southward, with it designated on the Fairmount–Chatsworth segment. By the end of 1926, SR 34 had been redesignated as a southern branch of SR 8. All of its length had a "sand clay or top soil" surface. SR 61 was designated on the previously unnumbered road north-northeast of Chatsworth. The southern half of the segment of SR 4 from Cartersville to Fairmount had a sand clay or top soil surface. The northern half of the segment of SR 2 from Fairmount to Chatsworth had a completed semi hard surface. Before the decade ended, US 78S was designated on the segment of SR 8 from northeast of Carrollton to Villa Rica. The segments of SR 4 from Cartersville to Fairmount, and SR 2 from Fairmount to Chatsworth, were redesignated as a southern extension of SR 61. At this time, the Chatsworth–Tennga segment was under construction.

=== 1930s ===
In 1930, the Cartersville–Rydal segment, as well as a small portion north of the Gordon–Murray county line, was under construction. The Rydal–Fairmount segment, as well as a small portion south-southeast of Chatsworth, had a completed semi hard surface. Later that year, a small portion of SR 8 southwest of Villa Rica, as well as a portion north of the Gordon–Murray county line, was under construction. The Cartersville–Rydal segment had a sand clay or top soil surface. Also, the Gordon County portion of the Fairmount–Chatsworth segment had completed grading, but no surface course. The next year, the segment of SR 8, from northeast of Carrollton to just southwest of Villa Rica, had a completed hard surface. The Cartersville–Rydal segment was under construction. A portion north of the Gordon–Murray county line had completed grading, but no surface course. The Chatsworth–Tennga segment had a sand clay or top soil surface. In January 1932, an unnumbered road was built between Villa Rica and Cartersville. In March of that year, SR 61 was designated on the previously unnumbered road from Dallas to Cartersville; however, there was no indication as to whether it was designated on the Villa Rica–Dallas segment. By the end of the year, the Cartersville–Rydal segment had completed grading, but no surface course. Near the end of 1933, this segment had a sand clay or top soil surface. The next year, SR 61 was designated on the Villa Rica–Dallas segment. SR 20 was designated on the Cartersville–Rydal segment. Also, a small portion north-northeast of Rydal had a completed semi hard surface. Before the year ended, US 411 was designated on the Cartersville–Tennga segment. The Rydal–Fairmount segment had a completed semi hard surface. A few months later, a portion south-southwest of Dallas was under construction. At the end of the year, a small portion north-northeast of Cartersville, and a portion north of Chatsworth, had a completed hard surface. Late in 1936, the central portion of the segment from Cartersville to Rydal had completed grading, but was not surfaced. Also, the Fairmount–Crandall segment had a completed hard surface. At the end of the year, a portion south-southwest of Rydal had a completed hard surface. A few months later, the Crandall to Tennga segment also had a completed hard surface. By the middle of 1937, about half of the segment from Villa Rica to Dallas, as well as a portion north of Dallas, was under construction. At this time, the segment from Cartersville to Rydal had a completed hard surface. Later that year, the highway was under construction from Villa Rica to the Paulding–Bartow county line. At the end of the year, a portion south-southwest of Dallas and a portion south of Fairmount had a completed hard surface. The next year, US 78S was redesignated as US 78 Alternate. The Rydal–Fairmount segment, as well as the Paulding County portion of the Villa Rica–Dallas segment, had a completed hard surface. By the middle of 1939, the portion of the Villa Rica–Dallas segment that was in Carroll and Douglas counties, as well as the Paulding County portion of the Dallas–Cartersville segment, had completed grading, but was not surfaced. The decade ended with SR 20 Spur being built in the northern part of Cartersville, to function like a northern bypass of the main part of the city. Also, the Bartow County portion of the segment from Dallas to Cartersville was under construction.

=== 1940s ===
At the beginning of 1940, the central portion of the Dallas–Cartersville segment had a completed hard surface. Near the end of the year, the entire Villa Rica–Dallas segment, as well as the Paulding County portion of the Dallas–Cartersville segment, had a completed hard surface. In 1943, SR 20 was shifted off of US 411/SR 61 to replace the old SR 20 Spur and SR 113's routing east of Cartersville. By the end of 1946, the Bartow County portion of the segment from Dallas to Cartersville had a completed hard surface. A year or two later, the southern branch of SR 8 was redesignated as SR 8 Alternate (SR 8 Alt.).

=== 1950s to 1980s ===
In 1952, US 78 Alt. was decommissioned. By the middle of 1954, SR 8 Alt. was redesignated as a southern extension of SR 61. Two decades later, SR 2 east of Cisco was impassable due to rock slides. It wasn't until near the end of the 1980s that SR 2 was re-routed south-southwest along US 411/SR 61 from Cisco to Chatsworth, where it began a concurrency with US 76/SR 52. US 76/SR 2/SR 52 traveled to the east and southeast into Ellijay, where SR 52 departed the concurrency. US 76/SR 2 turned left onto SR 5. They traveled northeast into Blue Ridge. Here, SR 5 departed the concurrency, and US 76/SR 2 headed east as previously.

== Major intersections ==
County	Location	mi	km	Destinations	Notes
Carroll		0.0	0.0	SR 166 (Bankhead Highway / Cutoff Road) – Carrollton, Atlanta	Southern terminus
Carroll	Villa Rica	8.4	13.5	I-20 (Tom Murphy Freeway / SR 402) / SR 101 begins – Birmingham, Atlanta	Southern end of SR 101 concurrency; southern terminus of SR 101; I-20 exit 24
Carroll	Villa Rica	9.2	14.8	US 78 west / SR 8 west (Bankhead Highway) / SR 101 north (Industrial Boulevard) – Temple, Rockmart	Northern end of SR 101 concurrency; southern end of US 78/SR 8 concurrency
Carroll	Villa Rica	10.4	16.7	US 78 east / SR 8 east (Bankhead Highway)	Northern end of US 78/SR 8 concurrency
Douglas	No major junctions				
Paulding		21.4	34.4	SR 120 Conn. (Hiram Sudie Road) – Hiram	
Paulding	Dallas	24.5	39.4	US 278 / SR 6 / SR 120 (Jimmy Campbell Parkway) – Rockmart, Buchanan, Powder Springs, Marietta	
Paulding	Dallas	25.3	40.7	SR 6 Bus. east (Merchants Drive)	Southern end of SR 6 Bus. concurrency
Paulding	Dallas	25.9	41.7	SR 381 north (Memorial Drive) – Acworth	Southern terminus of SR 381
Paulding	Dallas	26.3	42.3	SR 6 Bus. west (West Memorial Drive)	Northern end of SR 6 Bus. concurrency
Bartow	Cartersville	42.1	67.8	SR 113 south (Rockmart Highway) – Taylorsville	Southern end of SR 113 concurrency
Bartow	Cartersville	43.3	69.7	Etowah River	
Bartow	Cartersville	46.0	74.0	SR 293 north (North Bartow Street) – Kingston	Southern end of SR 293 concurrency
Bartow	Cartersville	46.4	74.7	SR 113 north / SR 293 south (South Tennessee Street)	Northern end of SR 113 and SR 293 concurrencies
Bartow	Cartersville	48.8	78.5	US 41 / US 411 south / SR 3 / SR 20 west (Joe Frank Harris Parkway SE) – Calhoun, Rome, Emerson	Southern end of US 411 and SR 20 concurrencies
Bartow	Cartersville	49.0	78.9	SR 20 east (Canton Highway) – Canton	Northern end of SR 20 concurrency
Bartow	Cartersville	52.4	84.3	I-75 (SR 401) – Atlanta, Chattanooga	I-75 exit 293
Bartow		60.1	96.7	SR 140 (Henry Mack Hill Road) – Adairsville, Waleska	
Gordon	Fairmount	67.0	107.8	SR 53 west (Calhoun Street) – Calhoun	Southern end of SR 53 concurrency
Gordon	Fairmount	67.4	108.5	SR 53 east (Fairmount Highway SE) – Jasper	Northern end of SR 53 concurrency
Gordon		73.9	118.9	SR 156 west – Calhoun	Eastern terminus of SR 156
Gordon		78.1	125.7	SR 136 – Resaca, Talking Rock	
Murray		80.2	129.1	Coosawattee River	
Murray	Ramhurst	85.9	138.2	US 76 east / SR 282 east – Ellijay	Southern end of US 76 concurrency; western terminus of SR 282
Murray	Chatsworth	91.1	146.6	SR 2 east / SR 52 east (East Fort Street) / SR 52 Alt. west (West Fort Street)	Southern end of SR 2 and SR 52 concurrencies; eastern terminus of SR 52 Alt.
Murray	Chatsworth	92.6	149.0	US 76 west / SR 52 west (G.I. Maddox Parkway)	Northern end of US 76 and SR 52 concurrencies
Murray	Eton	95.4	153.5	SR 286 west (Coffey Road)	Eastern terminus of SR 286
Murray	Cisco	104.4	168.0	SR 2 west – Varnell, Ringgold	Northern end of SR 2 concurrency
Murray	Tennga	107.1	172.4	US 411 north / SR 33 north	Northern terminus at Tennessee state line; northern end of US 411 concurrency; southern terminus of SR 33
1.000 mi = 1.609 km; 1.000 km = 0.621 mi: Concurrency terminus

== Cartersville connector route ==
State Route 61 Connector
- Main Street
- Location: Cartersville
- Length: 2.3 mi (3.7 km)

The entire route is in Cartersville, Bartow County.

mi	km	Destinations	Notes
0.0	0.0	SR 61 / SR 293 (Tennessee Street / Main Street south) – Dallas, Emerson, White, Fairmount	Future southern terminus of SR 61 Conn.; roadway continues as SR 61 south; SR 61 takes on the Main Street name
0.9	1.4	US 41 / SR 3 (Joe Frank Harris Parkway) – Emerson, Calhoun, Rome	
2.3	3.7	I-75 (SR 401) – Atlanta, Chattanooga	Future northern terminus of SR 61 Conn.; current northern terminus of SR 113; I-75 exit 288
1.000 mi = 1.609 km; 1.000 km = 0.621 mi
