= Georgia State Route 113 =

State highway in Georgia, United States

State Route 113
- Georgia State Route 113 highlighted in red

Route information
- Maintained by GDOT
- Length: 58.1 mi (93.5 km)

Major junctions
- South end: US 27 / SR 1 in Carrollton
- SR 166 Conn. in Carrollton; I-20 south of Temple; US 78 / SR 8 in Temple; SR 274 through Temple; SR 120 from Draketown to Union; SR 101 from Union to Rockmart; US 278 / SR 6 from east of Rockmart to Rockmart; SR 61 / SR 293 through Cartersville; US 41 / SR 3 in Cartersville
- North end: I-75 in Cartersville

Location
- Country: United States
- State: Georgia
- Counties: Carroll, Haralson, Paulding, Polk, Bartow

Highway system
- Georgia State Highway System; Interstate; US; State; Special
← SR 112	→ SR 114

State Route 113 (SR 113) is a state highway in western Georgia, United States. The 69-mile-long (111 km) route connects US 27/SR 1 in Carrollton and Interstate 75 (I-75) in Cartersville.

== Route description ==
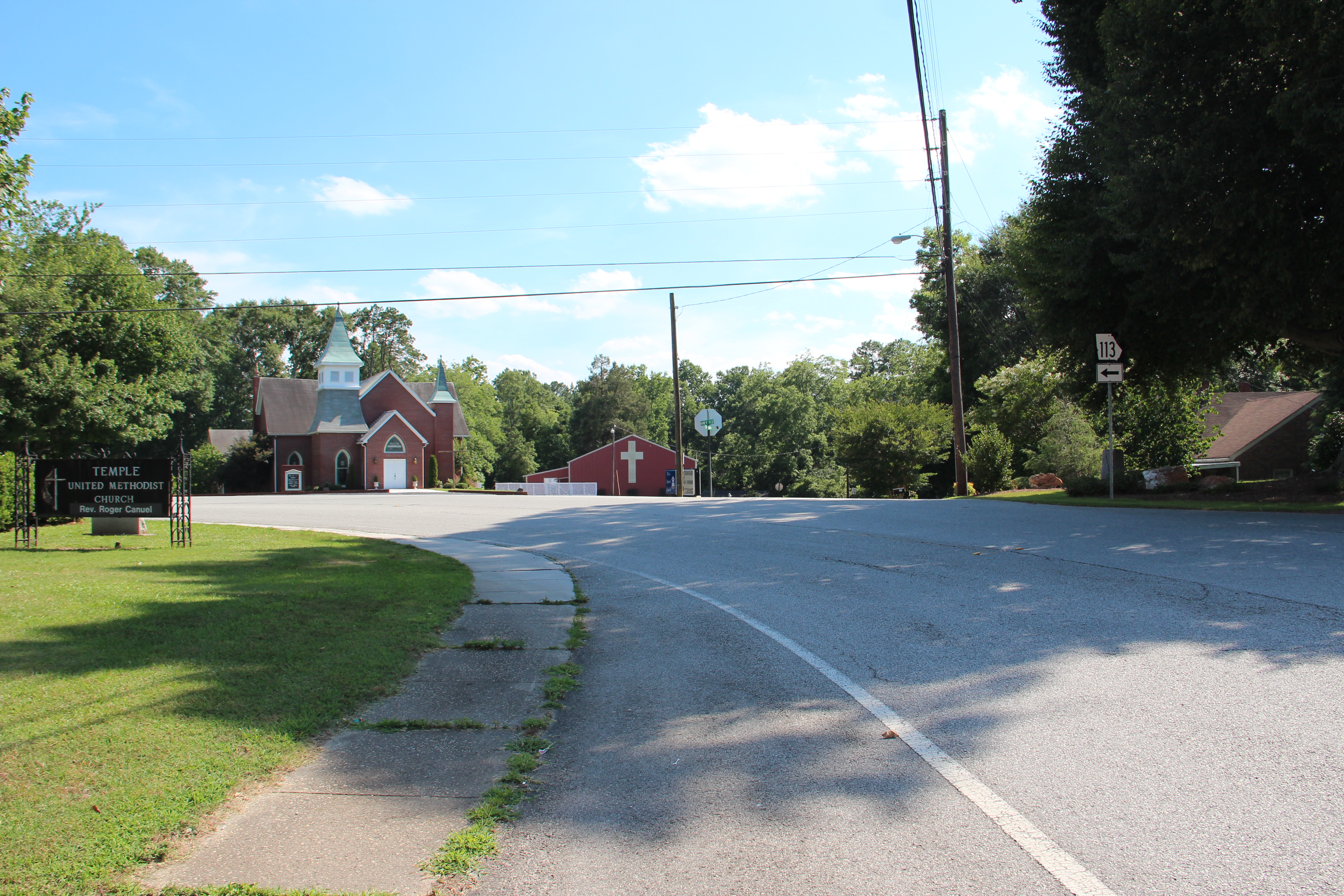
SR 113 in Temple.

SR 113 begins at an intersection with US 27/SR 1 in Carrollton. The highway travels north, intersects I-20, then travels through the town of Temple. In extreme eastern Haralson County, the route begins a concurrency with SR 120 traveling east, then travels concurrent with SR 101 northward. North of Yorkville, SR 101/SR 113 also travels concurrent with US 278/SR 6 to Rockmart. The highway departs Rockmart to the northeast. After crossing the Etowah River, the highway travels through downtown Cartersville as Main Street, before reaching its northern terminus at I-75 in the eastern part of Cartersville. SR 113 is usually marked as a north–south signed highway, but in areas like Taylorsville, the highway is signed as an east–west route. It is also signed as an east–west highway at its northern terminus at I-75.

== Future ==
GDOT plans to reroute SR 113 to a future southern Cartersville Bypass that is currently being built to its future northern terminus at I-75 exit 285 (3 miles south of SR 113’s current north end at I-75 exit 288) where roadway continues as Red Top Mountain Road. This project requires the existing segment of SR 113 through the city northeast of SR 293 to be redesignated as SR 61 Connecter (SR 61 Conn.) and the remainder of the existing segment of SR 113 (entirely concurrent with SR 61) through town southwest of SR 293 to be decommissioned after the rerouting of SR 113 is complete. The future SR 113 will have connector roads to SR 293 and US 41/SR 3 as the route will not directly meet them. SR 113 will have one new connector route known as SR 113 Conn. for connecting SR 113 to SR 293, but not for SR 113 connecting with US 41/SR 3. The connector road from US 41/SR 3 to SR 113 will be designated as SR 3 Conn. instead of another SR 113 Conn. or SR 113 Spur. This project is part of a future bigger project to create a Cartersville Bypass loop that can connect SR 113’s future northern terminus to US 411/SR 61 and SR 20 without using I-75 as GDOT is planning to soon build a northern Cartersville Bypass that will require to reroute US 411.

== Major intersections ==
=== Current alignment ===
County	Location	mi	km	Destinations	Notes
Carroll	Carrollton	0	0.0	US 27 / SR 1 – Bremen, Franklin	Southern terminus
Carroll	Carrollton	1.1	1.8	SR 166 Conn.	
Carroll	Temple	9.3	15.0	I-20 (SR 402) – Birmingham, Atlanta	I-20 exit 19
Carroll	Temple	10.3	16.6	US 78 / SR 8 – Villa Rica, Bremen	
Carroll	Temple	10.9	17.5	SR 274 west	South end of SR 274 concurrency
Carroll	Temple	11.1	17.9	SR 274 east	North end of SR 274 concurrency
Haralson	Draketown	18.4	29.6	SR 120 west – Buchanan	South end of SR 120 concurrency
Paulding	Union	22.2	35.7	SR 101 south / SR 120 east – Villa Rica, Dallas	North end of SR 120 concurrency; south end of SR 101 concurrency
Polk		31.6	50.9	US 278 east / SR 6 east – Dallas	South end of US 278/SR 6 concurrency
Polk	Rockmart	32.5	52.3	US 278 west / SR 6 north / SR 101 – Cedartown, Aragon, Rome	North end of SR 101 and US 278/SR 6 concurrencies
Bartow		50.1	80.6	Old Alabama Road east	Future rerouting of SR 113 north
Bartow		51.4	82.7	SR 61 south – Dallas	South end of SR 61 concurrency
Bartow	Cartersville	55.4	89.2	SR 293 north – Kingston	South end of SR 293 concurrency
Bartow	Cartersville	55.8	89.8	SR 61 north / SR 293 south – White, Fairmount, Emerson	North end of SR 61 and SR 293 concurrencies; beyond this intersection, SR 113 is proposed to be redesignated as SR 61 Conn.
Bartow	Cartersville	56.7	91.2	US 41 / SR 3 – Emerson, Calhoun, Rome	
Bartow	Cartersville	58.1	93.5	I-75 (SR 401) – Atlanta, Chattanooga	Current northern terminus of SR 113; future northern terminus of SR 61 Conn.; I-75 exit 288
1.000 mi = 1.609 km; 1.000 km = 0.621 mi: Concurrency terminus

=== Future alignment ===
County	Location	mi	km	Destinations	Notes
Bartow		50.1	80.6	SR 61 north (Rockmart Highway north) – Cartersville	Future rerouting of SR 61 north; future southern end of SR 61 concurrency
Bartow		51.1	82.2	SR 61 south (Dallas Highway) – Dallas	Future roundabout intersection; future rerouting of SR 61 south; future northern end of SR 61 concurrency
Bartow	Emerson	56.8	91.4	SR 113 Conn. north to SR 293 (Main Street) – Emerson, Cartersville	Future southern terminus of SR 113 Conn.
Bartow	Emerson	58.1	93.5	SR 3 Conn. north to US 41 / SR 3 (Joe Frank Harris Parkway) / Lake Point Parkway south – Emerson, Cartersville, Calhoun, Rome	Future southern terminus of SR 3 Conn.; northern terminus of Lake Point Parkway
Bartow	Emerson	58.6	94.3	I-75 (SR 401) / Red Top Mountain Road east – Atlanta, Chattanooga	Future northern terminus of SR 113; I-75 exit 285; roadway continues as Red Top Mountain Road
1.000 mi = 1.609 km; 1.000 km = 0.621 mi: Concurrency terminus

== Emerson connector route ==
State Route 113 Connector
- Location: Emerson
- Length: 0.3 mi (480 m)

The entire route is in Emerson, Bartow County.

mi	km	Destinations	Notes
0.0	0.0	SR 113 (Red Top Mountain Road) to I-75 / SR 61 – Taylorsville, Rockmart	Future southern terminus of SR 113 Conn.
0.3	0.48	SR 293 (Main Street) – Emerson, Cartersville	Future northern terminus of SR 113 Conn.
1.000 mi = 1.609 km; 1.000 km = 0.621 mi
