= Paul Dixon (baseball) =

- Pitcher
- Born: August 28, 1907; Kingston, Georgia, U.S.
- Died: January 20, 1994 (aged 86); Steelton, Pennsylvania, U.S.
- Batted: Right Threw: Right

Negro league baseball debut
- 1928, for the Harrisburg Giants

Last appearance
- 1938, for the Philadelphia Stars
- Stats at Baseball Reference

Teams
- Harrisburg Giants (1928); Baltimore Black Sox (1932, 1934); Washington Pilots (1932); New York Black Yankees (1933); New York Cubans (1935); Bacharach Giants (1936); Newark Eagles (1936); Philadelphia Stars (1937–1938)

Paul Perry Dixon (August 28, 1907 – January 20, 1994) was an American professional baseball pitcher in the Negro leagues. He played from 1928 to 1938 with several teams. His brother, Rap, also played in the Negro leagues.
