= Georgia State Route 274 =

State highway in Georgia, United States

State Route 274
- SR 274 highlighted in red

Route information
- Maintained by GDOT
- Length: 1.2 mi (1.9 km)

Major junctions
- West end: US 78 / SR 8 in Temple
- SR 113 through Temple
- East end: US 78 / SR 8 in Temple

Location
- Country: United States
- State: Georgia
- Counties: Carroll

Highway system
- Georgia State Highway System; Interstate; US; State; Special
← SR 273	→ SR 275

State Route 274 (SR 274) is a west–east arc-shaped state highway located completely within the city of Temple in the northwestern part of the U.S. state of Georgia. From its western terminus, the route loops from US 78/SR 8 into downtown Temple, briefly becoming concurrent with SR 113, then exits downtown to meet its eastern terminus, again at US 78/SR 8. It, tied with SR 260, is considered the shortest state route in Georgia.

== Route description ==
SR 274 begins at an intersection with US 78/SR 8 in the central part of Temple. The route travels to the north-northeast along James Street. Then, it curves to the northeast. At Sage Street, in downtown Temple, it turns to the southeast, paralleling some Norfolk Southern Railway tracks. One block later, it intersects SR 113. The two highways are concurrent for two blocks. After SR 113 departs the concurrency, SR 274 continues to the southeast and meets its eastern terminus, a second intersection with US 78/SR 8.

SR 274 is not part of the National Highway System, a system of roadways important to the nation's economy, defense, and mobility.

== Major intersections ==
The entire route is in Temple, Carroll County.

mi	km	Destinations	Notes
0.0	0.0	US 78 / SR 8	Western terminus
0.5	0.80	SR 113 south (Carrollton Street) – Carrollton	Western end of SR 113 concurrency
0.6	0.97	SR 113 north – Draketown	Eastern end of SR 113 concurrency
1.2	1.9	US 78 / SR 8	Eastern terminus
1.000 mi = 1.609 km; 1.000 km = 0.621 mi: Concurrency terminus
