= Georgia State Route 101 =

State highway in Georgia, United States

State Route 101
- SR 101highlighted in red

Route information
- Maintained by GDOT
- Length: 43.5 mi (70.0 km)

Major junctions
- South end: I-20 / SR 61 in Villa Rica
- US 78 / SR 8 in Villa Rica; US 278 / SR 6 in southeast of Rockmart; US 278 Bus. / SR 6 Bus. in Rockmart; US 411 / SR 20 in Rome; US 27 / SR 1 / SR 20 / SR 53 in Rome
- North end: US 27 / SR 1 / SR 20 in Rome

Location
- Country: United States
- State: Georgia
- Counties: Carroll, Paulding, Polk, Floyd

Highway system
- Georgia State Highway System; Interstate; US; State; Special
← SR 100	→ SR 102

State Route 101 (SR 101) is a 43.5-mile-long (70.0 km) state highway in the northwestern part of the U.S. state of Georgia. It travels in a south–north orientation between the Atlanta metropolitan area and the Alabama state line. Its routing passes through portions of Carroll, Paulding, Polk, and Floyd counties. It connects the Villa Rica and Rome areas of the state.

== Route description ==
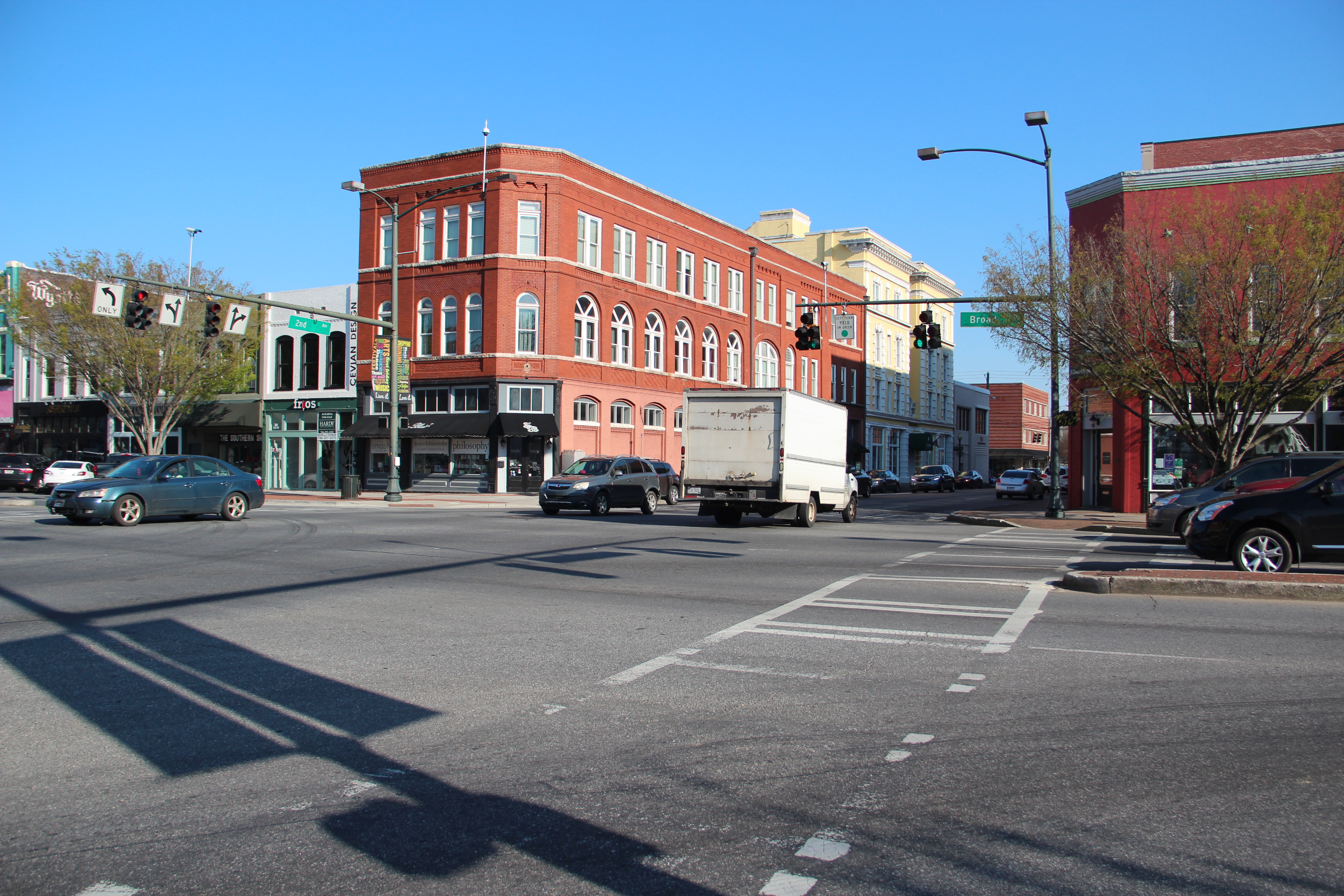
State Route 101 at its intersection with Broad Street in Rome

SR 101 begins at an interchange with Interstate 20 (I-20) in Villa Rica, in Carroll County, where SR 101 is concurrent with SR 61 for approximately 0.5 miles (0.80 km) north until they intersect US 78/SR 8. SR 61 splits off, while SR 101 travels northwest into Paulding County. The only major intersection in the county is with SR 113/SR 120 (Buchanan Highway), in the unincorporated community of Union. SR 101/SR 113 travel concurrently. In Polk County, the road meets US 278/SR 6, southeast of Rockmart. The four highways travel concurrent to the northwest, and enter Rockmart. They bypass the main part of town to the east, northeast, and north. On the northeast corner of the city, SR 113 splits off to the northeast. At Piedmont Avenue, SR 101 splits off to the north-northwest. This intersection also marks the eastern terminus of US 278 Bus./SR 6 Bus. SR 101 continues to the northwest and enters Floyd County. It curves to an almost-due-north orientation and enters Rome. In the city, it has an incomplete interchange with US 411 north/SR 20 east, just east of Georgia Northwestern Technical College; there is no access from SR 101 to US 411 south/SR 20 west. The route travels to the north and curves to the northwest to intersect US 27/SR 1/SR 53 (Turner McCall Boulevard). It crosses over the Etowah and Oostanaula rivers. It passes Barron Stadium and Floyd Medical Center, before it meets its northern terminus, an intersection with US 27/SR 1/SR 20, farther along in the city. SR 101 is not part of the National Highway System, a system of roadways important to the nation's economy, defense, and mobility.

== Major intersections ==
County	Location	mi	km	Destinations	Notes
Carroll	Villa Rica	0.0	0.0	I-20 (SR 402) / SR 61 south – Birmingham, Atlanta, Carrollton	Southern terminus; southern end of SR 61 concurrency; I-20 exit 24
Carroll	Villa Rica	0.5	0.80	US 78 / SR 8 / SR 61 north (Bankhead Highway) – Bremen, Douglasville	Northern end of SR 61 concurrency
Paulding	Union	9.4	15.1	SR 113 south / SR 120 – Temple, Buchanan, Dallas	Southern end of SR 113 concurrency
Polk		18.8	30.3	US 278 east / SR 6 east – Dallas	Southern end of US 278/SR 6 concurrency
Polk	Rockmart	22.5	36.2	SR 113 north (Cartersville Road) – Taylorsville	Northern end of SR 113 concurrency
Polk	Rockmart	23.4	37.7	US 278 west / SR 6 west / US 278 Bus. west / SR 6 Bus. west (North Piedmont Avenue)	Northern end of US 278/SR 6 concurrency; eastern terminus of US 278 Bus./SR 6 Bus.
Floyd	Rome	40.6	65.3	US 411 north / SR 20 east – Cartersville	No access from SR 101 to US 411 south/SR 20 west
Floyd	Rome	41.7	67.1	US 27 / SR 1 / SR 20 / SR 53 (Turner McCall Boulevard) – Cedartown	
Floyd	Rome	43.5	70.0	US 27 / SR 1 (Turner McCall Boulevard NE/Martha Berry Boulevard NE) / SR 20 (Turner McCall Boulevard) – Summerville, Cedar Bluff	Northern terminus
1.000 mi = 1.609 km; 1.000 km = 0.621 mi: Concurrency terminus; Incomplete access
