= Fairfield Plantation, Georgia =

- Unincorporated community Census-designated place
- Location within Georgia Location within the United States
- Coordinates: 33°38′37″N 84°55′33″W
- Country: United States
- State: Georgia
- County: Carroll

Area
  - Total: 4.51 sq mi (11.69 km^{2})
  - Land: 4.11 sq mi (10.65 km^{2})
  - Water: 0.40 sq mi (1.03 km^{2})
- Elevation: 1,140 ft (350 m)

Population (2020)
  - Total: 4,898
  - Density: 1,190.7/sq mi (459.73/km^{2})
- Time zone: UTC-5 (Eastern (EST))
  - Summer (DST): UTC-4 (EDT)
- ZIP Code: 30180 (Villa Rica)
- Area codes: 770/678/470
- FIPS code: 13-28440
- GNIS feature ID: 2812672

Fairfield Plantation is an unincorporated community and census-designated place in eastern Carroll County, Georgia, United States. It is a community situated around a golf course and reservoir (Treasure Lake), 8 miles (13 km) south of Villa Rica and 38 miles (61 km) west of Atlanta. Fairfield Plantation was created as a Planned Unit Development in the 1970s. The population as of the 2020 census is 4,898.

== Demographics ==
Historical population
Census	Pop.	Note	%±
2020	4,898		—
U.S. Decennial Census; 2020

=== 2020 census ===
Fairfield Plantation was first listed as a census designated place in the 2020 census.

As of the 2020 census, Fairfield Plantation had a population of 4,898. The median age was 46.4 years. 19.5% of residents were under the age of 18 and 21.5% of residents were 65 years of age or older. For every 100 females there were 99.5 males, and for every 100 females age 18 and over there were 97.3 males age 18 and over.

Fairfield Plantation CDP, Georgia – Racial and ethnic composition Note: the US Census treats Hispanic/Latino as an ethnic category. This table excludes Latinos from the racial categories and assigns them to a separate category. Hispanics/Latinos may be of any race.
Race / Ethnicity (NH = Non-Hispanic)	Pop 2020	% 2020
White alone (NH)	3,795	77.48%
Black or African American alone (NH)	563	11.49%
Native American or Alaska Native alone (NH)	14	0.29%
Asian alone (NH)	41	0.84%
Pacific Islander alone (NH)	2	0.04%
Some Other Race alone (NH)	26	0.53%
Mixed Race or Multi-Racial (NH)	221	4.51%
Hispanic or Latino (any race)	236	4.82%
Total	4,898	100.00%

0.0% of residents lived in urban areas, while 100.0% lived in rural areas.

There were 1,879 households in Fairfield Plantation, of which 28.8% had children under the age of 18 living in them. Of all households, 60.7% were married-couple households, 13.4% were households with a male householder and no spouse or partner present, and 21.1% were households with a female householder and no spouse or partner present. About 20.1% of all households were made up of individuals and 9.6% had someone living alone who was 65 years of age or older.

There were 2,025 housing units, of which 7.2% were vacant. The homeowner vacancy rate was 1.1% and the rental vacancy rate was 5.9%.
