= Georgia State Route 275 =

State highway in Georgia, United States

State Route 275
- SR 275 highlighted in red

Route information
- Maintained by GDOT
- Length: 5.5 mi (8.9 km)

Major junctions
- West end: SR 21 southeast of Springfield
- East end: Dead end in Ebenezer

Location
- Country: United States
- State: Georgia
- Counties: Effingham

Highway system
- Georgia State Highway System; Interstate; US; State; Special
← SR 274	→ SR 276

State Route 275 (SR 275) is a 5.5-mile-long (8.9 km) southwest–northeast state highway entirely within Effingham County in southeast Georgia. It travels from a point between Rincon and Springfield to Ebenezer.

== Route description ==
SR 275 begins at an intersection with SR 21 between Rincon and Springfield. It travels to the northeast to its eastern terminus, at a dead end in the ghost town of Ebenezer on the Savannah River.

== Major intersections ==
The entire route is in Effingham County.

Location	mi	km	Destinations	Notes
	0.0	0.0	SR 21 to I-95 – Rincon, Springfield	Western terminus
Ebenezer	5.5	8.9	Eastern terminus	
1.000 mi = 1.609 km; 1.000 km = 0.621 mi
