= Rap Dixon =

Negro league baseball player (1902–1944)

- Outfielder
- Born: September 15, 1902; Kingston, Georgia, U.S.
- Died: July 20, 1944 (aged 41); Detroit, Michigan, U.S.
- Batted: Right Threw: Right

Negro leagues debut
- 1922, for the Harrisburg Giants

Last Negro leagues appearance
- 1937, for the Pittsburgh Crawfords

Negro leagues (Note: On December 16, 2020, Major League Baseball declared the Negro leagues, from the span of 1920–1948, to be a "Major League". Dixon's statistics reflect his time in the Negro leagues from 1924–1930, 1932, and 1934 until the end of his career.) statistics
- Batting average: .336
- Home runs: 58
- Runs batted in: 347
- Stats at Baseball Reference
- Managerial record at Baseball Reference

Teams
- Harrisburg Giants (1922–1927); Philadelphia Tigers (1928); Baltimore Black Sox (1928–1930, 1934); Chicago American Giants (1930); Hilldale Club (1931); Pittsburgh Crawfords (1932, 1934, 1937); Washington Pilots (1932); Philadelphia Stars (1933); Brooklyn Eagles (1935); New York Cubans (1935); Homestead Grays (1936); Newark Eagles (1936); Pittsburgh Crawfords (1937)

Herbert Allen "Rap" Dixon (September 15, 1902 – July 20, 1944) was an American outfielder in Negro league baseball for a number of teams. He was born in Kingston, Georgia.

Although Dixon began playing in the league in 1922, he joined the semi-pro Harrisburg Giants in 1916 at the age of fourteen. Dixon was noticed for his quick and powerful bat by owner Colonel William "C.W." Strothers, who was building up the independent Giants at the time.

When Dixon began playing for Strothers in the 1920s, the outfield for the Giants was considered one of the best of all time; Dixon, Oscar Charleston, and Fats Jenkins. The lineup, in its entirety, scored runs at a higher pace than the 1927 New York Yankees. Additionally, they are the only Negro League outfield which remained intact for four years--only nine MLB outfields have met the four-year standard.

Dixon had many weapons; speed, hitting, and power were all his strengths and he became known as a triple threat. In 1929, he batted .382 with seven home runs, and led the league with six triples.

Dixon was also notable for discovering the Baseball Hall of Famer Leon Day playing in the Baltimore sandlots.

In a doubleheader played on Saturday, July 5, 1930, Dixon helped make history at Yankee Stadium, which, for the first time ever, played host to two Negro league teams. With 20,000 in attendance, Dixon hit one home run in the opener, then two more in the nightcap to help the Baltimore Black Sox salvage a split with the Lincoln Giants.

Dixon also was a teammate of such Hall of Fame greats as Satchel Paige and Judy Johnson when he was with the Pittsburgh Crawfords.

In later years, with the Black Sox, Rap played with his brother Paul and also with Day. Dixon was selected to the East-West All-Star Game in 1933. Also, in 26 games against white major leaguers, he compiled a .372 average.

Dixon died at age 41 in Detroit, Michigan.
