= Georgia State Route 293 =

State highway in Georgia, United States

State Route 293
- Georgia State Route 293 highlighted in red

Route information
- Maintained by GDOT
- Length: 29.7 mi (47.8 km)
- Existed: 1952–present

Major junctions
- South end: US 41 / SR 3 in Emerson
- North end: US 27 / SR 1 / SR 20 in Rome

Location
- Country: United States
- State: Georgia
- Counties: Bartow, Floyd

Highway system
- Georgia State Highway System; Interstate; US; State; Special
← SR 292	→ SR 294

State Route 293 (SR 293) is a 29.7-mile-long (47.8 km) southeast-to-northwest state highway that travels from Emerson, in Bartow County, to Rome, in Floyd County, in the northwestern part of the U.S. state of Georgia. SR 293 travels along the western alignment of the historic Dixie Highway, from its southern terminus to its intersection with SR 293 Connector. The original southern terminus was with US 41 in Kennesaw, passing through Kennesaw and Acworth. This length of the roadway was originally part of US 41.

== Route description ==
SR 293 begins at an intersection with US 41/SR 3 in Emerson, the highway runs northwest, passing through downtown Emerson before crossing the Etowah River and entering into Cartersville. It travels concurrent with SR 61/SR 113 through downtown Cartersville on Main Street. SR 293 leaves the concurrency through Bartow Street and Cherokee Avenue, before departing the city to the northwest via Cassville Highway. After crossing beneath US 411/SR 20, SR 293 intersects with the southern terminus of its only bannered route, SR 293 Connector. From here, the route turns to a more westerly direction, passing through Kingston. The route passes into Floyd County and later intersects with SR 1 Loop east of Rome. After its intersection with SR 1 Loop, SR 293 becomes a four-lane divided arterial road into downtown Rome. Shortly after its intersection with SR 53, SR 293 meets its northern terminus at US 27/SR 1.

SR 293 is not part of the National Highway System, a system of roadways important to the nation's economy, defense, and mobility.

== History ==
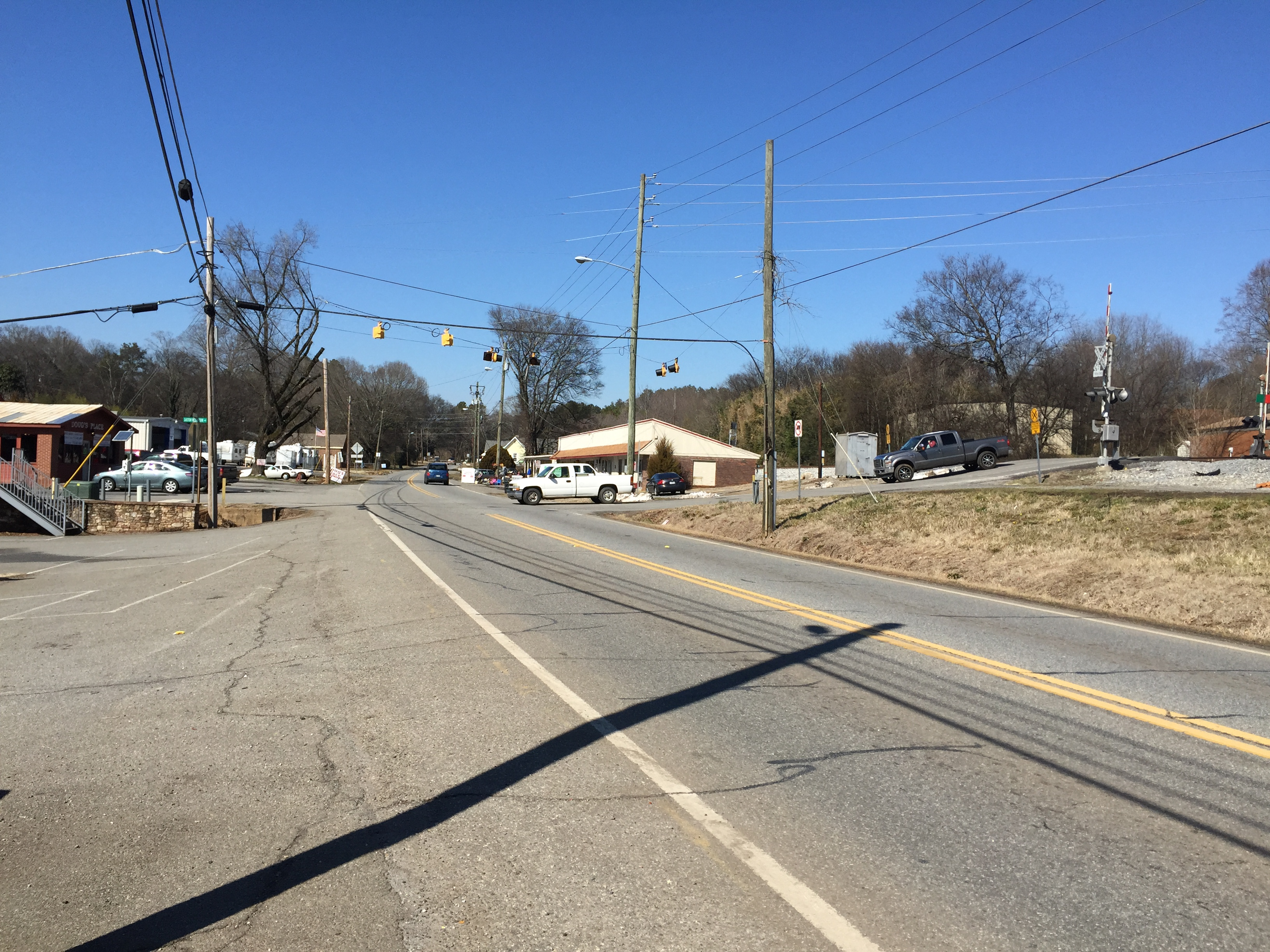
SR 293 in Emerson.

SR 293 travels through some historically significant areas of Georgia. From its southern terminus north to Kingston, it parallels the Western and Atlantic Railroad, which was used as a corridor for the Atlanta campaign during the Civil War and made famous by the Andrews Raid, also known as the "Great Locomotive Chase". The route also passes several miles to the east of the Etowah Indian Mounds.

SR 293 is itself historic; from its southern terminus to its intersection with SR 293 Connector, it travels along the western alignment of the former Dixie Highway.

The original southern terminus was with US 41 in Kennesaw, passing through Kennesaw and Acworth as Main Street in both towns. This stretch of road was originally part of US 41.

SR 293 was originally the state designation for the new section of US 41 from Cartersville to Kennesaw in the 1950s, with SR 3 remaining on the old US 41. SR 293 and SR 3 switched places in the late 1950s. In the early 1970s, SR 293 was expanded west from Cartersville to Rome, replacing SR 20 (which moved to the new four-lane US 411, which was built in the 1960s).

== Major intersections ==
County	Location	mi	km	Destinations	Notes
Bartow	Emerson	0.0– 0.1	0.0– 0.16	US 41 / SR 3 (Old US 41 / Old Allatoona Road) to I-75	Interchange
Bartow	Cartersville	4.3	6.9	SR 61 north (Tennessee Street) / SR 113 north (Main Street)	Southern end of SR 61/SR 113 concurrency
Bartow	Cartersville	4.6	7.4	SR 61 south / SR 113 south (Main Street) / Bartow Street	Southern end of SR 61/SR 113 concurrency
Bartow		10.5	16.9	SR 293 Conn. north (Cassville Road NW) to US 41 / SR 3	Southern terminus of SR 293 Connector
Floyd		27.0	43.5	SR 1 Loop	
Floyd	Rome	29.6	47.6	SR 53 (Broad Street / Martin Luther King Jr. Boulevard)	
Floyd	Rome	29.7	47.8	US 27 / SR 1 / SR 20 (Turner McCall Boulevard) / Broad Street	
1.000 mi = 1.609 km; 1.000 km = 0.621 mi: Concurrency terminus

== Bannered route ==
State Route 293 Connector
- Location: Near Cassville
- Length: 0.4 mi (640 m)

State Route 293 Connector (SR 293 Conn.) is a 0.4-mile-long (0.64 km) north–south connector route. As the type of route implies, it connects the SR 293 mainline with US 41/SR 3 south-southwest of Cassville. The road is known as Cassville Road NW for its entire length. A sign at its southern terminus indicates that this highway is part of the historical Dixie Highway.

The connector begins at an intersection with the SR 293 mainline. Here, the roadway continues as Burch Lane Northwest. The highway travels to the northeast and immediately curves to a due-north routing. It curves to the north-northeast, and then the north-northwest. After a curve to the east-northeast, it meets its northern terminus, an intersection with US 41/SR 3. At this point, the "Cassville Road NW" name continues to the north-northeast to enter Cassville

SR 293 Connector is not part of the National Highway System, a system of roadways important to the nation's economy, defense, and mobility.

The entire route is in Bartow County.

Location	mi	km	Destinations	Notes
	0.0	0.0	SR 293 – Cartersville, Kingston	Southern terminus; roadway continues as Burch Lane Northwest.
	15.4	24.8	US 41 / SR 3 – Cartersville, Canton, Calhoun	Northern terminus; roadway continues as Cassville Road Northwest.
1.000 mi = 1.609 km; 1.000 km = 0.621 mi
