= Carroll County, Georgia =

County in Georgia, United States

- County
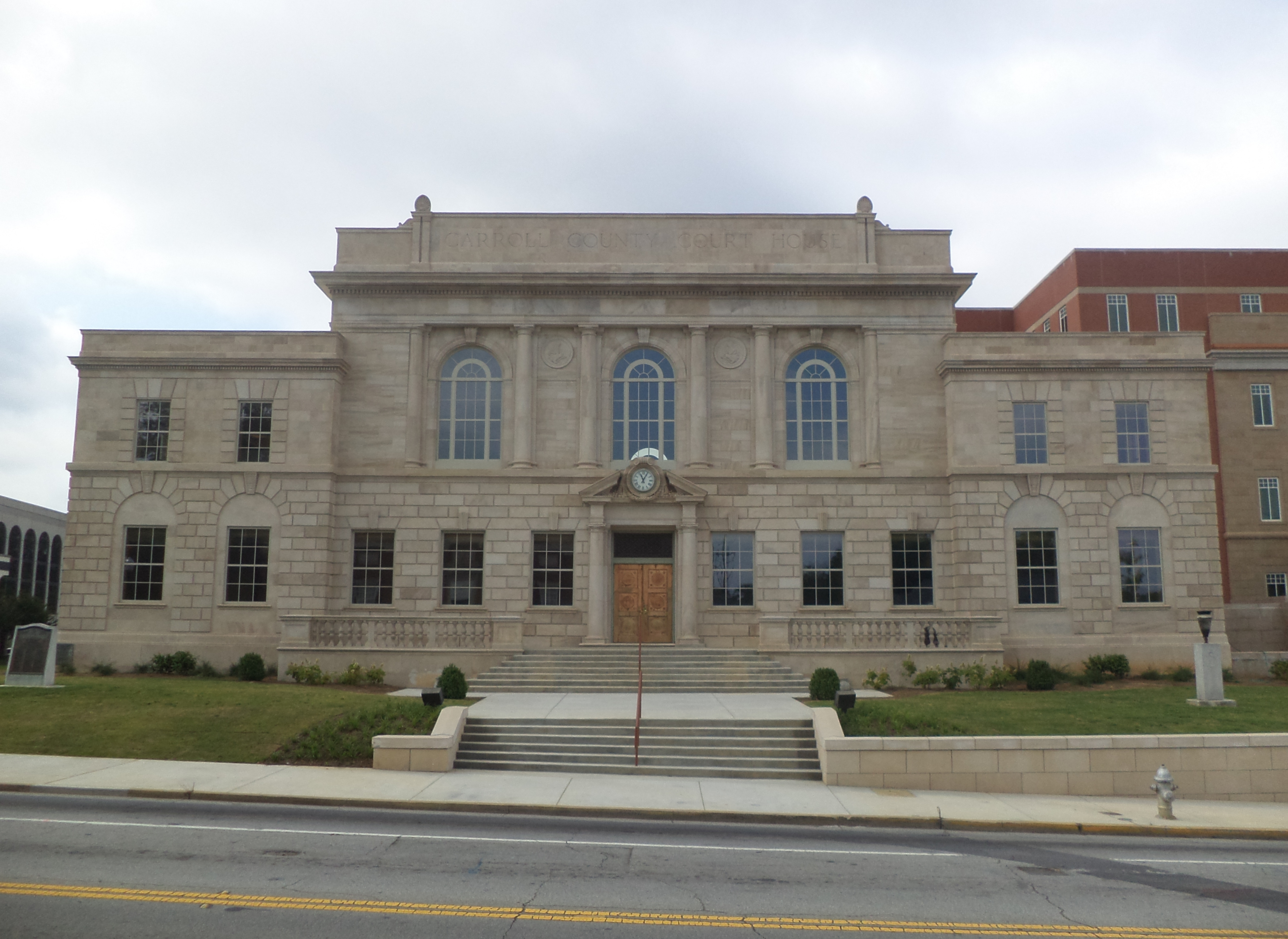
- Carroll County Courthouse

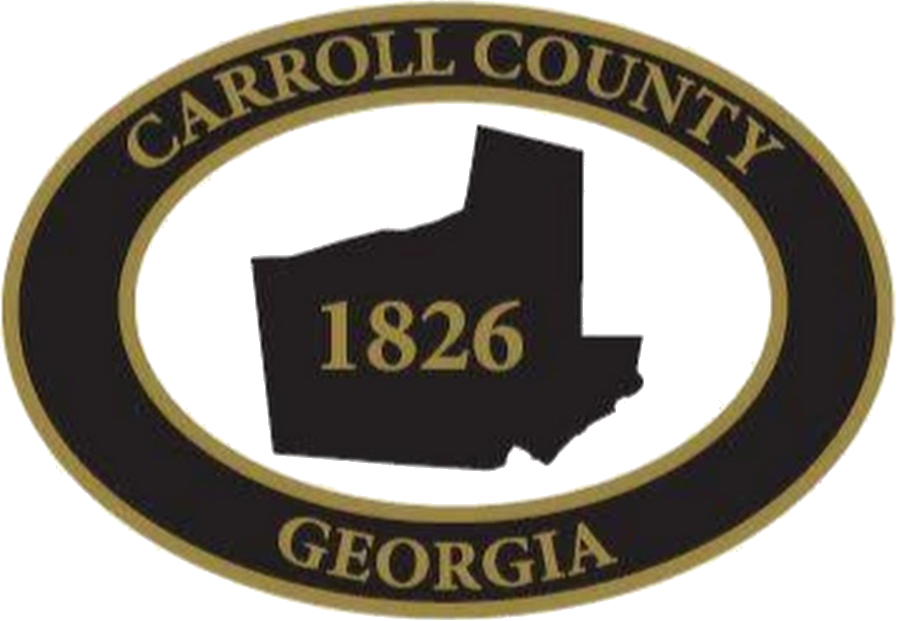
- Seal Logo

- Location within the U.S. state of Georgia
- Coordinates: 33°35′N 85°05′W
- Country: United States
- State: Georgia
- Founded: June 9, 1825; 201 years ago
- Named for: Charles Carroll of Carrollton
- Seat: Carrollton
- Largest city: Carrollton

Area
  - Total: 504 sq mi (1,310 km^{2})
  - Land: 499 sq mi (1,290 km^{2})
  - Water: 4.8 sq mi (12 km^{2}) 0.9%

Population (2020)
  - Total: 119,148
  - Estimate (2025): 131,036 ▲
  - Density: 239/sq mi (92.2/km^{2})
- Time zone: UTC−5 (Eastern)
  - Summer (DST): UTC−4 (EDT)
- Congressional district: 3rd
- Website: carrollcountyga.gov

Carroll County is a county in the West Central region of the State of Georgia. As of the 2020 census, its population was 119,148. Its county seat is the city of Carrollton. Carroll County is included in the Atlanta–Sandy Springs–Roswell metropolitan statistical area and is also adjacent to Alabama on its western border.

== History ==
The lands of Lee, Muscogee, Troup, Coweta, and Carroll counties were ceded by the Creek people in the Treaty of Indian Springs (1825). This was a huge amount of land in Georgia and Alabama, the last remaining portion of the Creeks' territory, and it was ceded by William McIntosh, the chief of the Lower Creek and a member of the National Council. This cession violated the Law, the Code of 1818 that protected communal tribal land. The Creek National Council ordered the execution of McIntosh and other signatories to the treaty for what it considered treason.

McIntosh was killed at his plantation home, at what has been preserved as the McIntosh Reserve. Menawa and a force of 100-150 Law Defenders from Upper Town lands ceded in this treaty carried out the executions of two other men, including Samuel Hawkins, one of McIntosh's sons-in-law. Benjamin Hawkins Jr., another son-in-law, was also named for execution but he escaped, and soon moved to East Texas with his wife and family. Both of the Hawkins brothers were sons of Benjamin Hawkins, the longstanding US Indian Supervisor of the Creek.

The boundaries of Carroll County were created by the Georgia General Assembly on June 9, 1825, but the county was not named until December 14, 1826. It was named for Charles Carroll of Carrollton, at that time the last surviving signer of the U.S. Declaration of Independence, as was Carrollton, the county seat.

When the county was first organized, the legislature designated the county seat as Old Carrollton, Georgia, but in 1830 it was moved to Carrollton.

This county originally extended from the Chattahoochee River to the Alabama state line on the east and on the west, with its northern boundary at the Cherokee Nation, just north of present-day Interstate 20. As population increased, this land was divided into Carroll, Douglas, and Heard counties, and parts of Haralson and Troup counties. The portion that became Douglas County was once Campbell County which no longer exists (it was divided between Douglas and Fulton counties).

Because the county had few slaves compared to counties developed for cotton plantations, it was called the Free State of Carroll during the 1850s. Even before the cession of territory by the Cherokee in the late 1830s, some white settlers lived in the northern part of the county in the area of Villa Rica.

Carroll County was the site of Georgia's first Gold Rush.

For a time Carroll County was the home of Horace King (architect). King helped build Moore's Bridge over the Chattahoochee River at Whitesburg. Moores Bridge was burned by Union soldiers during the Civil War. During the American Civil War, the county provided the Bowdon Volunteers and the Carroll Boys, which were a part of Cobb's Legion.

On August 21, 1995, Atlantic Southeast Airlines Flight 529 crashed in a field near Carrollton, Georgia. Nine of the 29 passengers and crew were killed in the crash.

In February 2008 several tornadoes hit Carroll County, destroying several homes and damaging many more. On May 11, 2008 (Mother's Day) some of the same areas were hit by more tornadoes. The Mother's Day tornadoes destroyed and damaged many homes and businesses.

On September 21, 2009, portions of Carroll County were flooded after eight days of heavy rainfall, resulting in multiple deaths. The flooding initially closed more than 60 highways and roads, and it destroyed a number of bridges. Early estimates of the damage totaled $22 million.

== Geography ==
According to the U.S. Census Bureau, the county has a total area of 504 square miles (1,310 km^{2}), of which 499 square miles (1,290 km^{2}) is land and 4.8 square miles (12 km^{2}) (0.9%) is water.

The western two-thirds of Carroll County, in a line from Roopville northeast to Villa Rica, is located in the Upper Tallapoosa River sub-basin of the ACT River Basin (Alabama-Coosa-Tallapoosa River Basin), while the eastern third, east of that same line, is located in the Middle Chattahoochee River-Lake Harding sub-basin of the ACF River Basin (Apalachicola-Chattahoochee-Flint River Basin).

=== Adjacent counties ===
- Paulding County – north
- Douglas County – east
- Fulton County – east
- Coweta County – southeast
- Heard County – south
- Randolph County, Alabama – southwest (Central Time border)
- Cleburne County, Alabama – west (Central Time border)
- Haralson County – northwest

== Communities ==
- City of Carrollton (county seat)
- City of Villa Rica*
- Fairfield (unincorporated)
- City of Temple
- City of Bowdon
- City of Mount Zion
- Town of Whitesburg
- Town of Roopville

*The eastern half of Villa Rica is in Douglas County

== Demographics ==
Historical population
| Census | Pop. | Note | %± |
|---|---|---|---|
| 1830 | 3,419 | | — |
| 1840 | 5,252 | | 53.6% |
| 1850 | 9,357 | | 78.2% |
| 1860 | 11,991 | | 28.2% |
| 1870 | 11,782 | | −1.7% |
| 1880 | 16,901 | | 43.4% |
| 1890 | 22,301 | | 32.0% |
| 1900 | 26,576 | | 19.2% |
| 1910 | 30,855 | | 16.1% |
| 1920 | 34,752 | | 12.6% |
| 1930 | 34,272 | | −1.4% |
| 1940 | 34,156 | | −0.3% |
| 1950 | 34,112 | | −0.1% |
| 1960 | 36,451 | | 6.9% |
| 1970 | 45,404 | | 24.6% |
| 1980 | 56,346 | | 24.1% |
| 1990 | 71,422 | | 26.8% |
| 2000 | 87,268 | | 22.2% |
| 2010 | 110,527 | | 26.7% |
| 2020 | 119,148 | | 7.8% |
| 2025 (est.) | 131,036 | ▲ | 10.0% |
U.S. Decennial Census; 1790-1880 1890-1910; 1920-1930 1930-1940; 1940-1950 1960-1980; 1980-2000 2010 2020

=== Racial and ethnic composition ===
Carroll County, Georgia – Racial and ethnic composition Note: the US Census treats Hispanic/Latino as an ethnic category. This table excludes Latinos from the racial categories and assigns them to a separate category. Hispanics/Latinos may be of any race.
| Race / Ethnicity (NH = Non-Hispanic) | Pop 1980 | Pop 1990 | Pop 2000 | Pop 2010 | Pop 2020 | % 1980 | % 1990 | % 2000 | % 2010 | % 2020 |
|---|---|---|---|---|---|---|---|---|---|---|
| White alone (NH) | 46,168 | 59,260 | 69,258 | 80,531 | 80,725 | 81.94% | 82.97% | 79.36% | 72.86% | 67.75% |
| Black or African American alone (NH) | 9,600 | 11,186 | 14,177 | 19,862 | 21,781 | 17.04% | 15.66% | 16.25% | 17.97% | 18.28% |
| Native American or Alaska Native alone (NH) | 68 | 146 | 206 | 296 | 271 | 0.12% | 0.20% | 0.24% | 0.27% | 0.23% |
| Asian alone (NH) | 93 | 224 | 532 | 836 | 1,104 | 0.17% | 0.31% | 0.61% | 0.76% | 0.93% |
| Native Hawaiian or Pacific Islander alone (NH) | x | x | 16 | 19 | 21 | x | x | 0.02% | 0.02% | 0.02% |
| Other race alone (NH) | 35 | 14 | 111 | 249 | 505 | 0.06% | 0.02% | 0.13% | 0.23% | 0.42% |
| Mixed race or Multiracial (NH) | x | x | 725 | 1,934 | 5,155 | x | x | 0.83% | 1.75% | 4.33% |
| Hispanic or Latino (any race) | 382 | 592 | 2,243 | 6,800 | 9,586 | 0.68% | 0.83% | 2.57% | 6.15% | 8.05% |
| Total | 56,346 | 71,422 | 87,268 | 110,527 | 119,148 | 100.00% | 100.00% | 100.00% | 100.00% | 100.00% |

=== 2020 census ===
As of the 2020 census, the county had a population of 119,148, 42,859 households, and 30,346 families residing in the county.

Of the residents, 23.6% were under the age of 18 and 14.9% were 65 years of age or older; the median age was 36.3 years. For every 100 females there were 94.1 males, and for every 100 females age 18 and over there were 90.5 males.

45.6% of residents lived in urban areas and 54.4% lived in rural areas.

The racial makeup of the county was 69.3% White, 18.6% Black or African American, 0.4% American Indian and Alaska Native, 0.9% Asian, 0.0% Native Hawaiian and Pacific Islander, 4.2% from some other race, and 6.6% from two or more races. Hispanic or Latino residents of any race comprised 8.0% of the population.

There were 42,859 households in the county, of which 34.5% had children under the age of 18 living with them and 27.7% had a female householder with no spouse or partner present. About 23.2% of all households were made up of individuals and 9.9% had someone living alone who was 65 years of age or older.

There were 46,239 housing units, of which 7.3% were vacant. Among occupied housing units, 66.6% were owner-occupied and 33.4% were renter-occupied. The homeowner vacancy rate was 1.4% and the rental vacancy rate was 6.6%.

== Transportation ==
=== Major roads ===
- I-20 / SR 402 (unsigned)
- US 27 / SR 1
  - US 27 Alt.
  - US 27 Bus. / SR 1 Bus.
- US 78 / SR 8
- SR 5
- SR 16
- SR 61
- SR 100
- SR 101
- SR 113
- SR 166
  - SR 166 Conn.
- SR 274

=== Pedestrians and cycling ===
- Carrollton Greenbelt
- UWG Nature Trails

== Railroads ==
The Southern Railway ran several daily passenger trains, including the Kansas City-Florida Special, the Sunnyland and an Atlanta-Birmingham section of the Piedmont Limited, making full stops in Bremen. These trains made flag or signal stops in Villa Rica as well. The last trains made stops in 1967.

== Education ==
There are three school districts in the county:

- Carroll County School District
- Carrollton City School District
- Bremen City School District

== Sports ==
- Georgia Storm FC - National Premier Soccer League - Carrollton - Formed in 2020 and competes in the Southeast Region of the NPSL. Home games are played at University of West Georgia soccer field.

== Politics ==
Carroll County has voted Republican consistently since 1984. Unlike most counties in the Atlanta metropolitan area, Carroll County as a whole has trended right for more than a decade. The county voted for Donald Trump by 39 percentage points in 2020 and later voted for Brian Kemp by almost 48 percentage points in the 2022 Georgia gubernatorial election.

For elections to the United States House of Representatives, Carroll County is part of Georgia's 3rd congressional district, currently represented by Brian Jack. For elections to the Georgia State Senate, Carroll County is divieded between District 6 and District 30. For elections to the Georgia House of Representatives, Carroll County is divided between districts 18, 70, 71 and 72.

United States presidential election results for Carroll County, Georgia
| Year | Republican | | Democratic | | Third party(ies) | |
| Year | No. | % | No. | % | No. | % |
|---|---|---|---|---|---|---|
| 1880 | 329 | 20.97% | 1,240 | 79.03% | 0 | 0.00% |
| 1884 | 499 | 19.52% | 2,058 | 80.48% | 0 | 0.00% |
| 1888 | 349 | 16.51% | 1,710 | 80.89% | 55 | 2.60% |
| 1892 | 543 | 16.31% | 2,137 | 64.19% | 649 | 19.50% |
| 1896 | 733 | 31.88% | 1,490 | 64.81% | 76 | 3.31% |
| 1900 | 697 | 35.43% | 1,270 | 64.57% | 0 | 0.00% |
| 1904 | 400 | 18.24% | 1,187 | 54.13% | 606 | 27.63% |
| 1908 | 505 | 28.26% | 917 | 51.32% | 365 | 20.43% |
| 1912 | 81 | 4.75% | 1,192 | 69.95% | 431 | 25.29% |
| 1916 | 118 | 5.48% | 1,621 | 75.33% | 413 | 19.19% |
| 1920 | 1,227 | 42.92% | 1,632 | 57.08% | 0 | 0.00% |
| 1924 | 526 | 20.72% | 1,784 | 70.29% | 228 | 8.98% |
| 1928 | 2,112 | 52.47% | 1,913 | 47.53% | 0 | 0.00% |
| 1932 | 284 | 8.01% | 3,232 | 91.14% | 30 | 0.85% |
| 1936 | 653 | 14.93% | 3,717 | 84.98% | 4 | 0.09% |
| 1940 | 616 | 13.90% | 3,808 | 85.92% | 8 | 0.18% |
| 1944 | 704 | 17.45% | 3,331 | 82.55% | 0 | 0.00% |
| 1948 | 526 | 14.33% | 2,671 | 72.76% | 474 | 12.91% |
| 1952 | 1,194 | 18.65% | 5,207 | 81.35% | 0 | 0.00% |
| 1956 | 1,712 | 26.07% | 4,855 | 73.93% | 0 | 0.00% |
| 1960 | 1,729 | 26.90% | 4,698 | 73.10% | 0 | 0.00% |
| 1964 | 4,984 | 50.96% | 4,794 | 49.02% | 2 | 0.02% |
| 1968 | 3,135 | 26.19% | 2,326 | 19.43% | 6,509 | 54.38% |
| 1972 | 8,296 | 79.36% | 2,158 | 20.64% | 0 | 0.00% |
| 1976 | 3,640 | 26.59% | 10,050 | 73.41% | 0 | 0.00% |
| 1980 | 5,815 | 40.17% | 8,202 | 56.66% | 458 | 3.16% |
| 1984 | 11,436 | 67.17% | 5,590 | 32.83% | 0 | 0.00% |
| 1988 | 10,754 | 69.20% | 4,706 | 30.28% | 81 | 0.52% |
| 1992 | 10,750 | 47.60% | 8,404 | 37.21% | 3,432 | 15.20% |
| 1996 | 11,157 | 51.25% | 8,438 | 38.76% | 2,174 | 9.99% |
| 2000 | 16,326 | 63.42% | 8,752 | 34.00% | 663 | 2.58% |
| 2004 | 24,837 | 70.27% | 10,224 | 28.92% | 286 | 0.81% |
| 2008 | 28,661 | 65.76% | 14,334 | 32.89% | 588 | 1.35% |
| 2012 | 28,280 | 67.86% | 12,688 | 30.45% | 704 | 1.69% |
| 2016 | 30,029 | 67.54% | 12,464 | 28.03% | 1,966 | 4.42% |
| 2020 | 37,476 | 68.76% | 16,236 | 29.79% | 790 | 1.45% |
| 2024 | 42,536 | 70.31% | 17,634 | 29.15% | 324 | 0.54% |

United States Senate election results for Carroll County, Georgia2
| Year | Republican | | Democratic | | Third party(ies) | |
| Year | No. | % | No. | % | No. | % |
|---|---|---|---|---|---|---|
| 2020 | 36,997 | 68.55% | 15,549 | 28.81% | 1,427 | 2.64% |
| 2020 | 32,573 | 69.06% | 14,590 | 30.94% | 0 | 0.00% |

United States Senate election results for Carroll County, Georgia3
| Year | Republican | | Democratic | | Third party(ies) | |
| Year | No. | % | No. | % | No. | % |
|---|---|---|---|---|---|---|
| 2020 | 2 | 0.02% | 0,167 | 1.54% | 10,688 | 98.44% |
| 2020 | 32,338 | 68.58% | 14,819 | 31.42% | 0 | 0.00% |
| 2022 | 29,838 | 68.58% | 12,582 | 28.92% | 1,087 | 2.50% |
| 2022 | 27,561 | 69.68% | 11,991 | 30.32% | 0 | 0.00% |

Georgia Gubernatorial election results for Carroll County
| Year | Republican | | Democratic | | Third party(ies) | |
| Year | No. | % | No. | % | No. | % |
|---|---|---|---|---|---|---|
| 2022 | 32,095 | 73.40% | 11,258 | 25.75% | 374 | 0.86% |

== See also ==
- National Register of Historic Places listings in Carroll County, Georgia
- 1987 Carroll County Cryptosporidiosis outbreak
- List of counties in Georgia
