= Emerson, Georgia =

- City
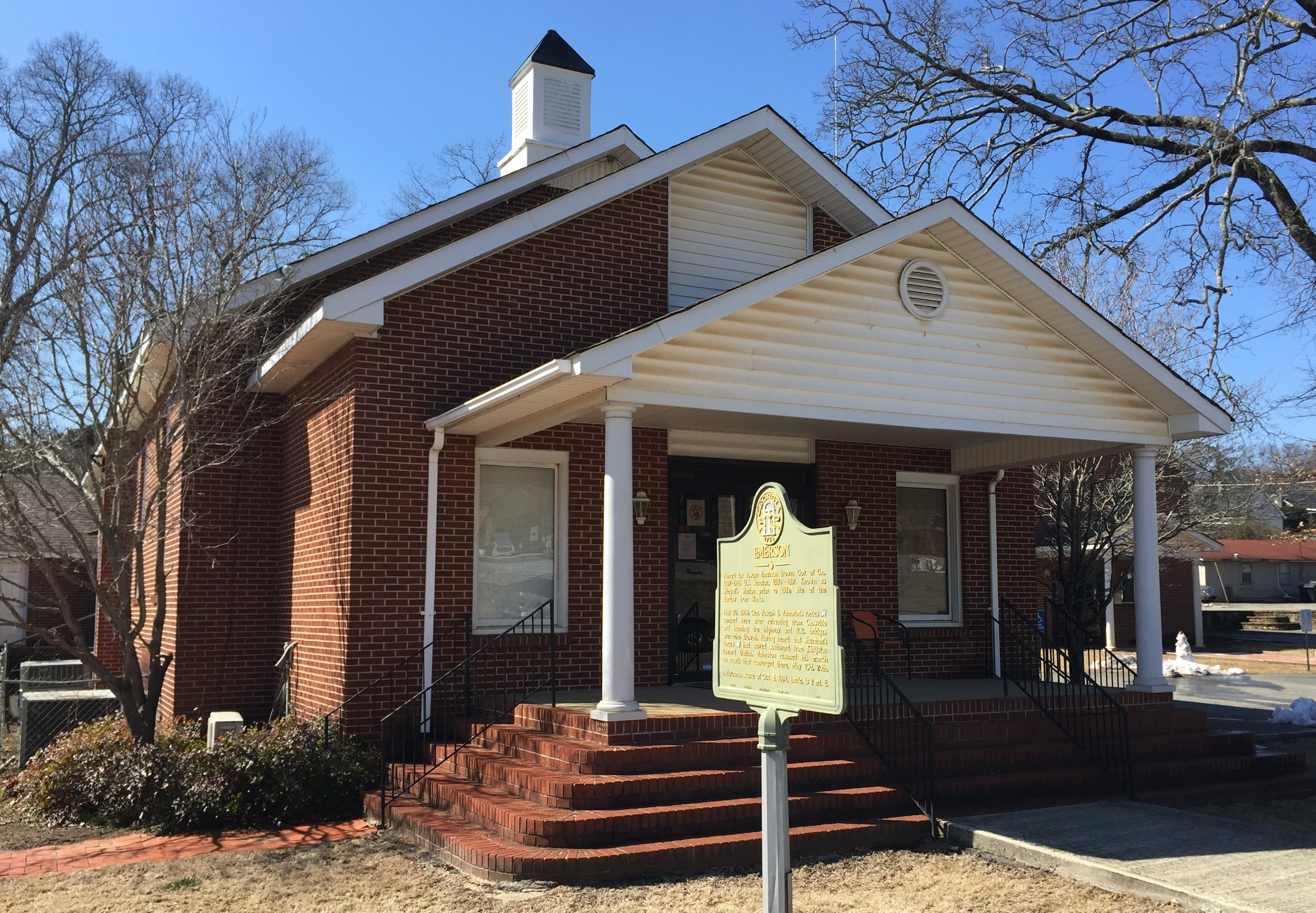
- Emerson City Hall

- Seal Logo

- Location in Bartow County and the state of Georgia
- Coordinates: 34°7′36.5″N 84°45′25.5″W
- Country: United States
- State: Georgia
- County: Bartow
- Incorporated (city): January 1, 1889

Area
  - Total: 8.63 sq mi (22.36 km^{2})
  - Land: 8.63 sq mi (22.36 km^{2})
  - Water: 0.0039 sq mi (0.01 km^{2})
- Elevation: 833 ft (254 m)

Population (2020)
  - Total: 1,415
  - Density: 164/sq mi (63.3/km^{2})
- Time zone: UTC-5 (Eastern (EST))
  - Summer (DST): UTC-4 (EDT)
- ZIP code: 30137
- Area codes: 770/678/470/943
- FIPS code: 13-27344
- GNIS feature ID: 0331660
- Website: www.cityofemerson.org

Emerson is a city in far southern Bartow County, Georgia, United States, on highways US-41/GA-3, GA-293, and I-75 (via exits 283 and 285). As of the 2020 census, Emerson had a population of 1,415.

Emerson is a gateway to Red Top Mountain State Park, a Georgia state park, which is surrounded by Lake Allatoona.

== History ==
An early variant name was "Stegall's Station". Emerson was incorporated in 1889, and named for Joseph Emerson Brown, the 42nd Governor of Georgia.

In 2022, the mayor of Emerson, Al Pallone, and his wife, were killed in a vehicular accident involving a drunk driver.

== Geography ==
Emerson is located at 34°7′36.5″N 84°45′25.5″W (34.131111, -84.752778).

According to the United States Census Bureau, the city has a total area of 7.32 square miles (18.95 km^{2}), of which 7.30 square miles (18.91 km^{2}) is land and 0.015 square miles (0.04 km^{2}), or 0.22%, is water.

== Demographics ==
Historical population
Census	Pop.	Note	%±
1880	200		—
1890	437		118.5%
1900	581		33.0%
1910	659		13.4%
1920	632		−4.1%
1930	657		4.0%
1940	1,497		127.9%
1950	1,527		2.0%
1960	1,320		−13.6%
1970	1,326		0.5%
1980	1,507		13.7%
1990	1,178		−21.8%
2000	1,092		−7.3%
2010	1,470		34.6%
2020	1,415		−3.7%
2025 (est.)	2,260	▲	59.7%
U.S. Decennial Census; 2025

=== 2020 census ===
Emerson racial composition
Race	Num.	Perc.
White (non-Hispanic)	1,022	72.23%
Black or African American (non-Hispanic)	98	6.93%
Native American	8	0.57%
Asian	20	1.41%
Pacific Islander	1	0.07%
Other/mixed	62	4.38%
Hispanic or Latino	204	14.42%

As of the 2020 census, Emerson had a population of 1,415 and 469 families. The median age was 43.7 years. 20.1% of residents were under the age of 18 and 17.2% were 65 years of age or older. For every 100 females, there were 101.9 males, and for every 100 females age 18 and over, there were 98.6 males age 18 and over.

0.0% of residents lived in urban areas, while 100.0% lived in rural areas.

There were 531 households in Emerson, of which 32.8% had children under the age of 18 living in them. Of all households, 55.0% were married-couple households, 16.4% were households with a male householder and no spouse or partner present, and 22.6% were households with a female householder and no spouse or partner present. About 19.0% of all households were made up of individuals, and 8.5% had someone living alone who was 65 years of age or older.

There were 567 housing units, of which 6.3% were vacant. The homeowner vacancy rate was 2.7% and the rental vacancy rate was 0.8%.

=== 2000 census ===
As of the census of 2000, there were 1,092 people, 382 households, and 297 families residing in the city. The population density was 185.0 inhabitants per square mile (71.4/km^{2}). There were 408 housing units at an average density of 69.1 units per square mile (26.7 units/km^{2}). The racial makeup of the city was 80.13% White, 17.03% African American, 0.46% Native American, 0.27% Asian, 0.55% from other races, and 1.56% from two or more races. Hispanic or Latino people of any race were 2.38% of the population.

There were 382 households, out of which 31.2% had children under the age of 18 living with them, 57.9% were married couples living together, 14.4% had a female householder with no husband present, and 22.0% were non-families. 19.1% of all households were made up of individuals, and 8.9% had someone living alone who was 65 years of age or older. The average household size was 2.84 and the average family size was 3.21.

In the city, the population was spread out, with 26.6% under the age of 18, 8.1% from 18 to 24, 30.4% from 25 to 44, 23.5% from 45 to 64, and 11.4% who were 65 years of age or older. The median age was 35 years. For every 100 females, there were 95.3 males. For every 100 females age 18 and over, there were 92.5 males.

The median income for a household in the city was $36,181, and the median income for a family was $41,429. Males had a median income of $29,250 versus $24,375 for females. The per capita income for the city was $16,270. About 12.3% of families and 16.4% of the population were below the poverty line, including 22.9% of those under age 18 and 17.9% of those age 65 or over.

== Film and television ==
Emerson has served as the backdrop for many film and television production scenes. The television mini-series Manhunt: Unabomber was filmed in Emerson, along with portions of the film The 5th Wave. Old Alabama Road in Emerson has appeared in several Fast & Furious movies.

== Schools ==
Emerson is home to three schools:

- Emerson Elementary School
- Red Top Middle School
- Excel Christian Academy
