= Temple, Georgia =

- City
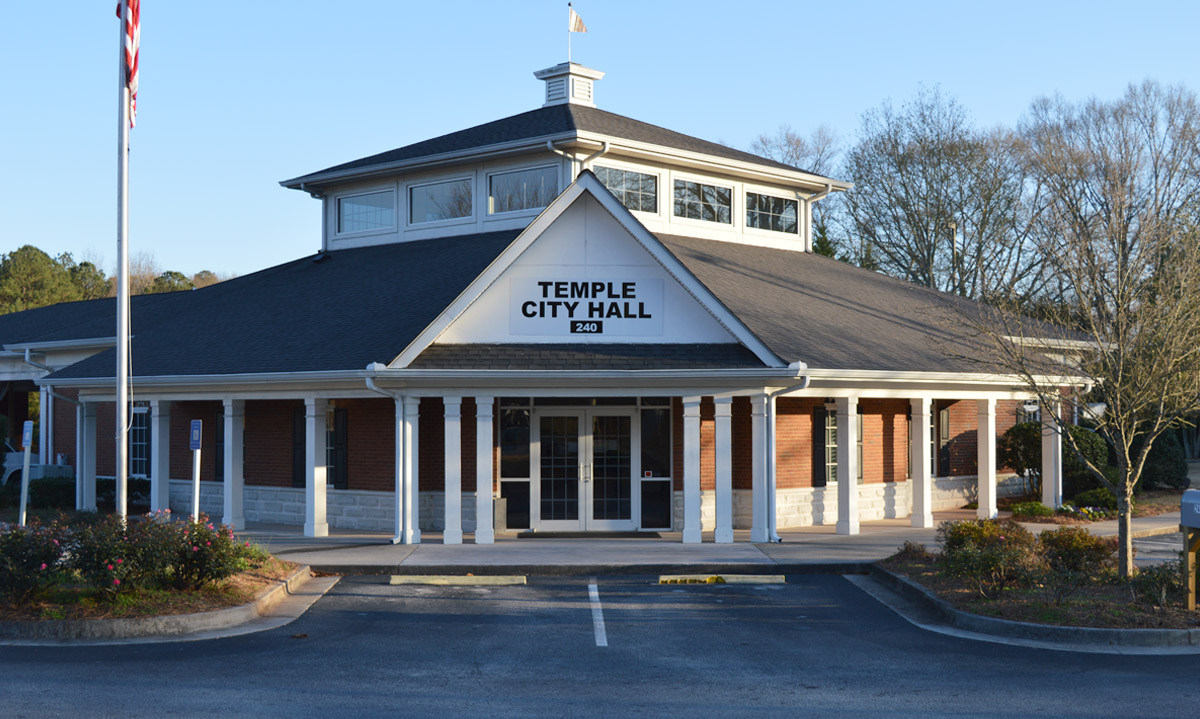
- Temple City Hall

- Seal

- Location in Carroll County and the state of Georgia
- Coordinates: 33°44′9″N 85°1′38″W
- Country: United States
- State: Georgia
- Counties: Carroll, Haralson

Government
  - Mayor: Joshua Woodard
  - City Administrator: Bill Osborne

Area
  - Total: 6.90 sq mi (17.87 km^{2})
  - Land: 6.81 sq mi (17.64 km^{2})
  - Water: 0.089 sq mi (0.23 km^{2})
- Elevation: 1,171 ft (357 m)

Population (2020)
  - Total: 5,089
  - Density: 747.4/sq mi (288.56/km^{2})
- Time zone: UTC-5 (Eastern (EST))
  - Summer (DST): UTC-4 (EDT)
- ZIP code: 30179
- Area code: 770
- FIPS code: 13-75832
- GNIS feature ID: 0333205
- Website: www.templega.us

Temple is a city in Carroll and Haralson counties in the U.S. state of Georgia. The population was 5,089 at the 2020 census, up from 4,228 in 2010, a 20.36% increase.

== History ==
The name "Temple" was adopted in 1883 when the railroad was extended to the settlement, after Mr. Temple, a railroad official. The Georgia General Assembly incorporated Temple as a town in 1883.

== Geography ==
Temple is located in northeastern Carroll County at 33°44′9″N 85°1′38″W (33.735723, -85.027298). A very small portion of the city extends west into Haralson County. U.S. Route 78 passes just south of the center of town, leading east 6 miles (10 km) to Villa Rica and west 7 miles (11 km) to Bremen. Interstate 20 passes through the southernmost part of the town, with access from Exit 19, and leads east 38 miles (61 km) to Atlanta and west 48 miles (77 km) to Oxford, Alabama. Carrollton, the county seat, is 12 miles (19 km) south via Highway 113.

According to the United States Census Bureau, Temple has a total area of 6.9 square miles (17.9 km^{2}), of which 6.8 square miles (17.6 km^{2}) is land and 0.08 square miles (0.2 km^{2}), or 1.38%, is water.

== Demographics ==
Historical population
| Census | Pop. | Note | %± |
|---|---|---|---|
| 1890 | 246 | | — |
| 1900 | 397 | | 61.4% |
| 1910 | 711 | | 79.1% |
| 1920 | 621 | | −12.7% |
| 1930 | 573 | | −7.7% |
| 1940 | 624 | | 8.9% |
| 1950 | 676 | | 8.3% |
| 1960 | 788 | | 16.6% |
| 1970 | 864 | | 9.6% |
| 1980 | 1,520 | | 75.9% |
| 1990 | 1,870 | | 23.0% |
| 2000 | 2,383 | | 27.4% |
| 2010 | 4,228 | | 77.4% |
| 2020 | 5,089 | | 20.4% |
| 2025 (est.) | 6,564 | ▲ | 29.0% |
U.S. Decennial Census; 2025

=== 2020 census ===
As of the 2020 census, Temple had a population of 5,089, with 1,575 households and 1,391 families residing in the city. The median age was 33.5 years. 27.8% of residents were under the age of 18 and 10.1% were 65 years of age or older. For every 100 females there were 94.7 males, and for every 100 females age 18 and over there were 89.5 males age 18 and over.

Temple racial composition as of 2020
| Race | Num. | Perc. |
|---|---|---|
| White | 3,395 | 66.71% |
| Black or African American | 1,032 | 20.28% |
| Native American | 15 | 0.29% |
| Asian | 67 | 1.32% |
| Other/mixed | 269 | 5.29% |
| Hispanic or Latino | 311 | 6.11% |

0.0% of residents lived in urban areas, while 100.0% lived in rural areas.

Among households in Temple, 42.8% had children under the age of 18 living in them. Of all households, 49.8% were married-couple households, 15.3% were households with a male householder and no spouse or partner present, and 26.4% were households with a female householder and no spouse or partner present. About 19.7% of all households were made up of individuals and 6.3% had someone living alone who was 65 years of age or older.

There were 1,844 housing units, of which 5.5% were vacant. The homeowner vacancy rate was 1.7% and the rental vacancy rate was 8.4%.

As of 2020, all of the residents of Temple lived in the Carroll County side, and no residents lived in the Haralson County side.

== Education ==
The Carroll County portion is in Carroll County School District.

The Haralson County portion is in Haralson County School District. As of 2020, that portion had no residents.
