= Kingston, Georgia =

- City
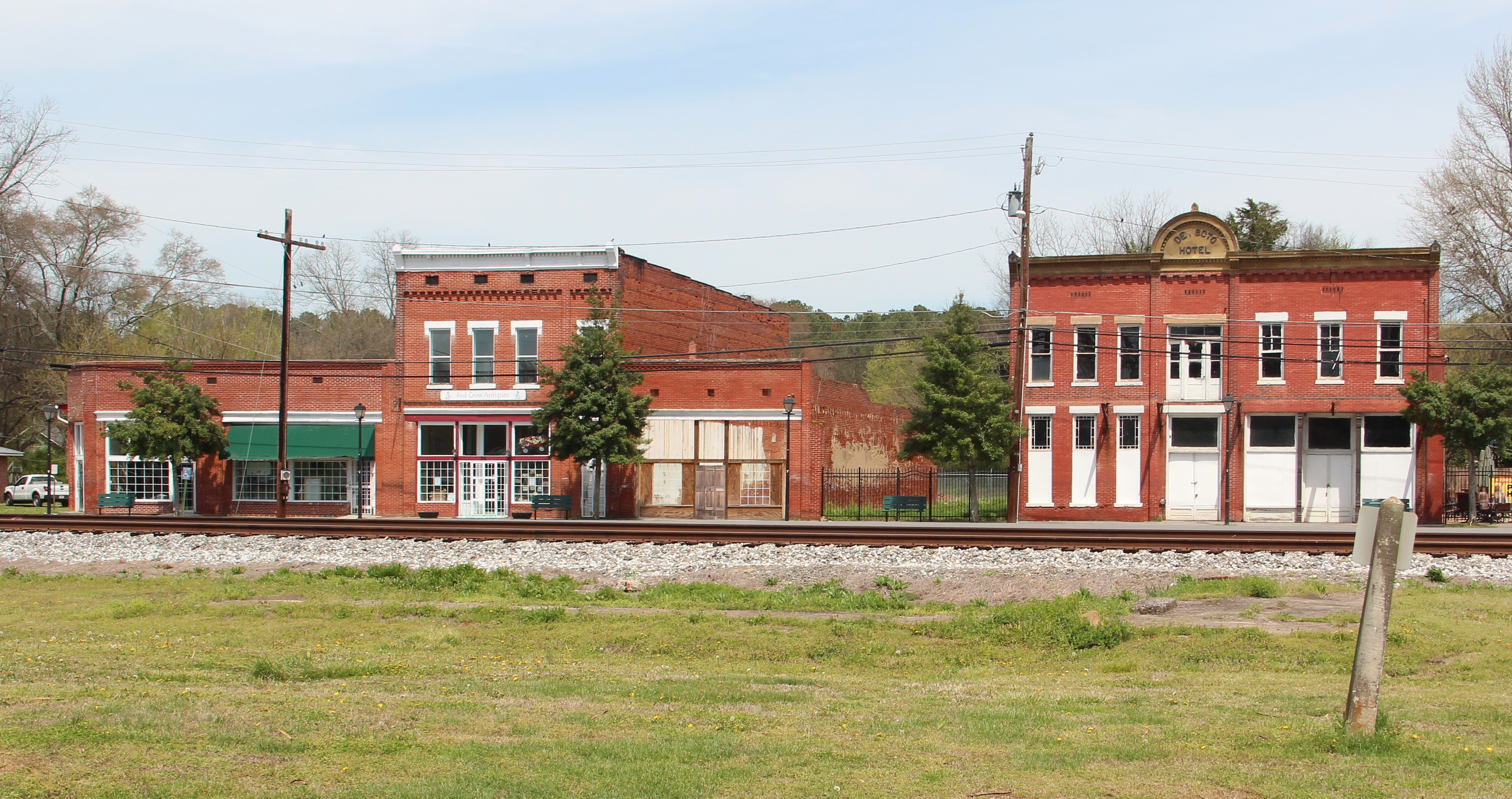
- Kingston historic district

- Seal

- Location in Bartow County and the state of Georgia
- Coordinates: 34°14′9″N 84°56′41″W
- Country: United States
- State: Georgia
- County: Bartow

Area
  - Total: 1.26 sq mi (3.26 km^{2})
  - Land: 1.26 sq mi (3.26 km^{2})
  - Water: 0 sq mi (0.00 km^{2})
- Elevation: 702 ft (214 m)

Population (2020)
  - Total: 722
  - Density: 573.6/sq mi (221.47/km^{2})
- Time zone: UTC-5 (Eastern (EST))
  - Summer (DST): UTC-4 (EDT)
- ZIP code: 30145
- Area codes: 770/678/470/943
- FIPS code: 13-43668
- GNIS feature ID: 0332152
- Website: www.cityofkingstonga.org

Kingston is a village in Bartow County, Georgia, United States. The population was 722 at the 2020 census.

== Geography ==
Kingston is located in west-central Bartow County.

According to the United States Census Bureau, the city has a total area of 1.3 square miles (3.3 km^{2}), all land.

Georgia State Route 293 (Kingston Highway) passes through the center of town, leading southeast 11 miles (18 km) to Cartersville and west 13 miles (21 km) to Rome. U.S. Route 411 is a four-lane highway that passes 1 mile (2 km) south of Kingston, connecting the same two larger communities.

== History ==
Native American tribes once inhabited the area. People of the Mississippian culture were in the vicinity until about 1500 AD. Cherokee removal occurred locally by 1838. White settlers were moved in as early as 1832, after a land lottery. The city was named for John Pendleton King, a United States Senator from Georgia.

On April 12, 1862, James J. Andrews with 18 Union soldiers in disguise, and 1 civilian, having seized the locomotive The General at Big Shanty (now Kennesaw) intending to wreck the Western and Atlantic Railroad, were forced to side-track here and wait for the southbound freights to pass. After a long delay The General continued north. Pursuing from Big Shanty, William Allen Fuller (conductor) led a crew which used a push-car and other means and eventually caught the highjackers.

Confederate hospitals located here during 1862–1864. 250 Confederate and two Union soldiers died of wounds, disease and sickness. These men were wounded in the battles of Perryville, Chickamauga, Missionary Ridge, and in the Dalton-Kingston Campaign. The patients were moved to Atlanta in May 1864 to avoid capture by the Union, who later used the hospitals. The dead are buried in unmarked graves nearby.

=== Atlanta Campaign ===
Union general William T. Sherman made his headquarters in the Hargis House May 16–19, for reorganization of forces in the campaign that would end at Atlanta. Assuming Johnston's army had moved, from Adairsville, directly on Kingston and the river crossings south, May 18, led Sherman to concentrate his forces here—only to discover that Johnston had gone directly to Cassville where, without making a stand, he continued to Allatoona on May 20. Sherman countered on May 23, by moving due south.

On May 18, 1864, Lieutenant General William J. Hardee's corps marched from Adairsville on the road parallel to the Western and Atlantic Railroad en route to Cass Station. He turned east on this road to join General Polk's and Hood's Confederate corps at Cassville which had moved on the direct Adairsville - Cassville Road. Sherman erred when he assumed that all of Johnston's army had marched from Adairsville, as Hardee had, to Kingston. This resulted in his ordering his forces concentrated here—discovering later that the Confederates were 5.5 miles (8.9 km) east at Cassville and not at the Etowah River south of Kingston.

On May 19 Union generals Daniel Butterfield and Joseph Hooker, the new XX Corps, were headquartered at the house of Confederate Colonel Hawkins F. Price, a state senator who had voted for Georgia secession in 1861. Hooker had been ordered from Adairsville to Kingston, on false reports that Johnston had retreated there. South of the Price house Hooker discovered that Johnston had gone to Cassville.

On May 19, 1864, the IV Corps, followed by the XIV Corps, reached Kingston at 8 a.m. The IVth turned east to Cassville. A division of the XIVth sent to Gillem's bridge over the Etowah River found no retreating Confederates. Johnston's forces were at Cassville, 5.5 miles (8.9 km) east. McPherson's XV Corps and XVI Corps, moving south from Barnsley's, camped on Woolley's plantation 2 miles (3.2 km) west. The IV Corps, XX Corps and XXIII Corps were at Cassville.

May 19, 1864, McPherson's army (XVth & XVIth Corps) marched from Barnsley's and camped on the Woolley Plantation. This right wing of Sherman's advance, Kingston to Dallas, crossed the river, heading south, on Woolley's Bridge over the Etowah River, May 23.

On October 11, 1864, while encamped on the Woolley Plantation, the Ohio soldiers of the XXIII Corps voted in a state election.

In 1864, a road southward from Wooley's Bridge (Etowah River) crossed the road near this point and ran to Van Wert (Rockmart) and Dallas. This was the route of Union Major General James B. McPherson's Army of the Tennessee (XVth and XVIth Corps), the right wing of forces under Sherman moving from Kingston to the Dallas front, May 23 and 24. At that time, the church stood at the northwestern angle of the crossroads. Another edifice was erected on the site of the present structure, .75 miles (1.21 km) eastward.

Sherman's forces encamped until May 23, when advance across the Etowah River began.

=== End of the Civil War ===
The first Decoration Day, or Memorial Day, was observed in Kingston in late April 1865, and has been a continuous observance here since that day, the only such record held by any community in this nation. The first Decoration Day was observed while Union troops still occupied the town, flowers being placed on both Confederate and Union graves that day.

In 2014, Bellware and Gardiner dismissed this claim in The Genesis of the Memorial Day Holiday in America. They point out that the timing of the observance and locations of General Judah and Wofford during April 1865 make the claim untenable.

On May 12, 1865, Confederate Brigadier General William T. Wofford surrendered 3,000 to 4,000 soldiers to Union Brigadier General Henry M. Judah. These were the last significant Confederate regulars to surrender east of the Mississippi. These were mostly Georgians, not paroled in Virginia, North Carolina, and elsewhere. During final negotiations, Gen. Wofford's headquarters were at the McCravey - Johnson residence on Church Street. General Judah's headquarters were at Spring Bank, the home of the Rev. Charles Wallace Howard, 2 miles (3 km) north of Kingston. Rations were supplied to the Confederate soldiery by the Federal commissary.

== Demographics ==
Historical population
Census	Pop.	Note	%±
1870	402		—
1880	483		20.1%
1890	559		15.7%
1900	512		−8.4%
1910	522		2.0%
1920	596		14.2%
1930	553		−7.2%
1940	653		18.1%
1950	675		3.4%
1960	695		3.0%
1970	714		2.7%
1980	733		2.7%
1990	616		−16.0%
2000	659		7.0%
2010	637		−3.3%
2020	722		13.3%
2023 (est.)	902	▲	24.9%
U.S. Decennial Census

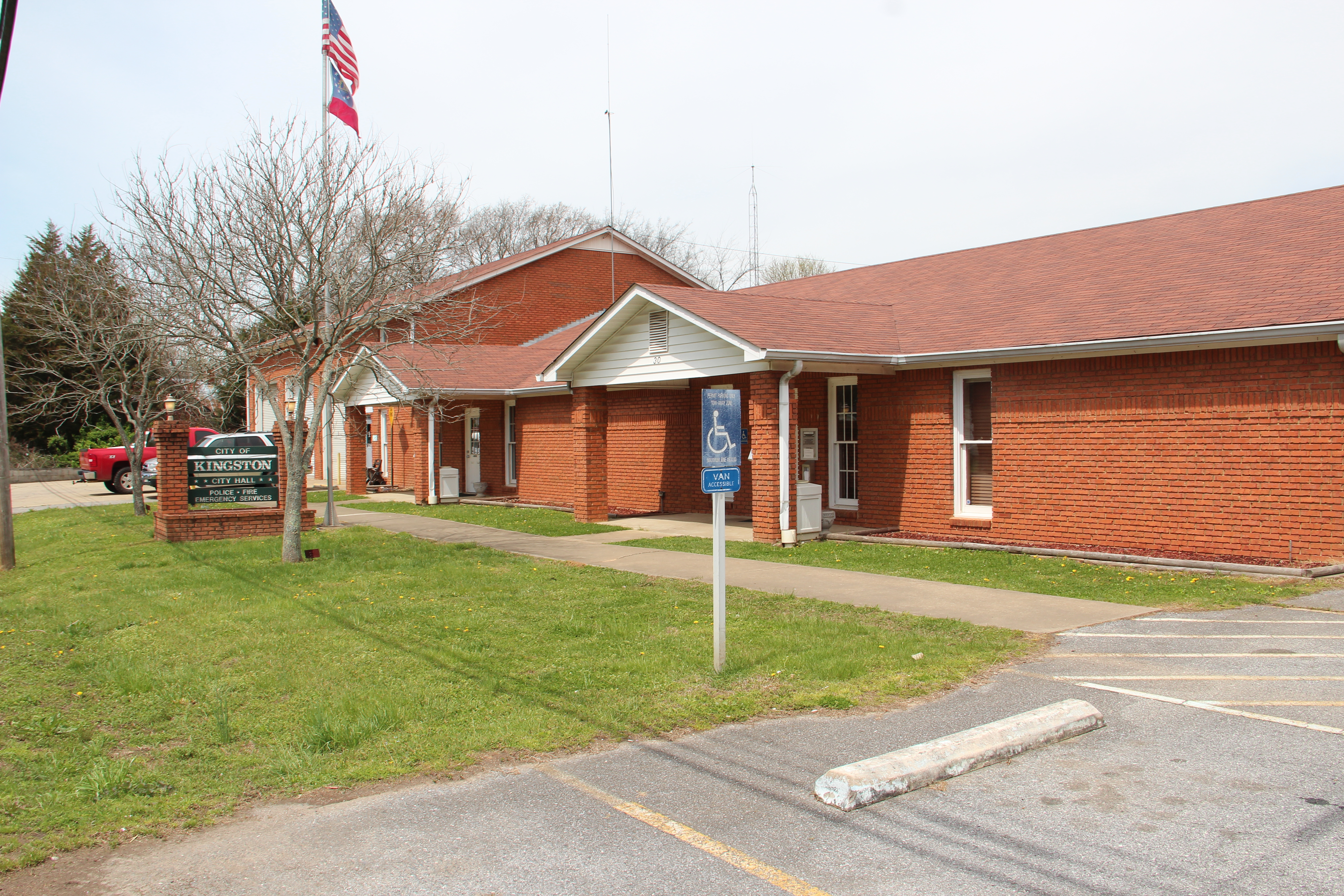
Kingston City Hall

As of the census of 2000, there were 659 people, 248 households, and 191 families residing in the city. The population density was 817.3 inhabitants per square mile (315.6/km^{2}). There were 287 housing units at an average density of 355.9 per square mile (137.4/km^{2}). The racial makeup of the city was 68.59% White, 29.59% African American, 0.15% Pacific Islander, 0.76% from other races, and 0.91% from two or more races. Hispanic or Latino people of any race were 1.52% of the population.

There were 248 households, out of which 32.7% had children under the age of 18 living with them, 49.2% were married couples living together, 22.6% had a female householder with no husband present, and 22.6% were non-families. 20.6% of all households were made up of individuals, and 11.7% had someone living alone who was 65 years of age or older. The average household size was 2.66 and the average family size was 3.04.

In the city, the population was spread out, with 26.1% under the age of 18, 10.3% from 18 to 24, 26.3% from 25 to 44, 24.3% from 45 to 64, and 13.1% who were 65 years of age or older. The median age was 36 years. For every 100 females, there were 97.3 males. For every 100 women age 18 and over, there were 87.3 men.

The median income for a household in the city was $27,083, and the median income for a family was $36,667. Males had a median income of $28,333 versus $22,353 for females. The per capita income for the city was $18,319. About 10.4% of families and 15.4% of the population were below the poverty line, including 17.8% of those under age 18 and 18.6% of those age 65 or over.

== Landmarks ==
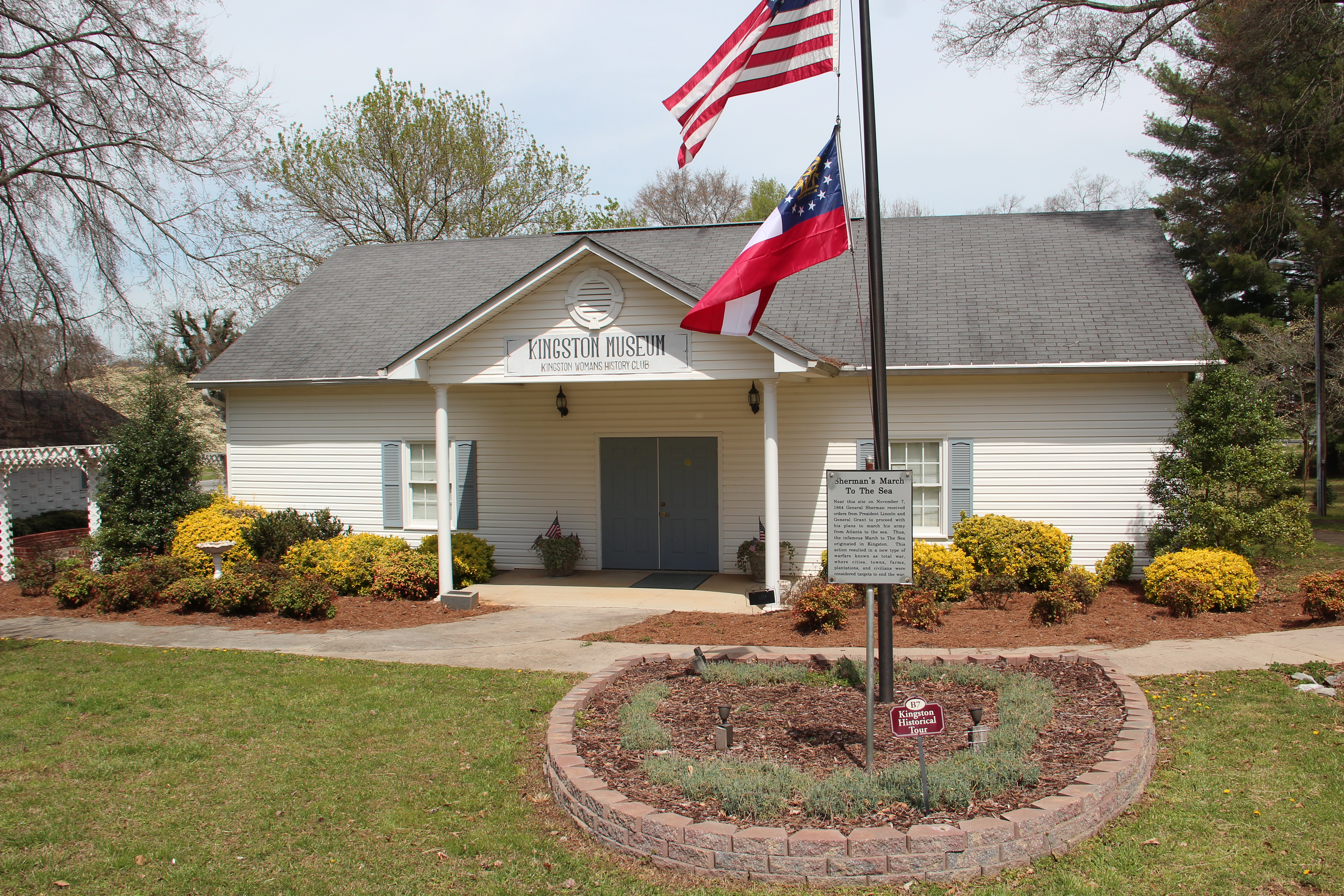
Kingston Museum

- Kingston has a small museum and several historical landmarks related to the Civil War and to the Native American tribes which once lived there.
- Kingston Saltpeter Cave, located south of the city, is the largest cave in Bartow County and was used by the Confederacy to produce gunpowder during the Civil War. It is closed to public access.

List of Kingston area historic markers:

- Confederate Memorial Day
- Hardee's Corps at Kingston
- Historic Price House
- 2.5 miles (4.0 km) northeast is the Site of the Thomas V. B. Hargis House
- Kingston Methodist Church. The original Methodist church, with another name at another location, was built in 1845. It was rebuilt in Kingston in 1854, and dedicated by Rev. Lovick Pierce. It was the only church remaining after Sherman's march through Kingston. It opened its doors to all denominations. It also served as Kingston's schoolhouse for many years.
- Old Macedonia Church, organized 1847
- Spring Bank
- Georgia (Bartow County), Kingston, where the post-war surrender of Confederate Troops took place
- The Federal Army at Kingston

== Notable people ==
- Rap Dixon, baseball player in the Negro leagues
