= U.S. Route 27 in Georgia =

Section of United States Numbered Highway in Georgia, United States

U.S. Highway 27
- State Route 1 Martha Berry Highway
- US 27 highlighted in red

Route information
- Maintained by GDOT
- Length: 356.088 mi (573.068 km)
- Existed: 1934–present
- History: SR 1 established at least as early as 1919

Major junctions
- South end: US 27 / SR 63 / SR 1 at the Florida state line southeast of Attapulgus
- US 84 / SR 38 in Bainbridge; US 82 / SR 50 east of Cuthbert; US 280 / SR 520 from Cusseta to Columbus; I-185 in Columbus; I-85 in LaGrange; I-20 in Bremen; US 78 / SR 8 in Bremen; US 278 / SR 6 / SR 100 in Cedartown; US 411 from Six Mile to Rome
- North end: US 27 / SR 27 / SR 1 at the Tennessee state line on the Rossville–Chattanooga line

Location
- Country: United States
- State: Georgia
- Counties: Decatur, Miller, Early, Clay, Randolph, Stewart, Chattahoochee, Muscogee, Harris, Troup, Heard, Carroll, Haralson, Polk, Floyd, Chattooga, Walker, Catoosa

Highway system
- United States Numbered Highway System; List; Special; Divided; Georgia State Highway System; Interstate; US; State; Special
← SR 26	→ SR 27
← US 1	SR 1	→ SR 1E

U.S. Highway 27 (US 27) is a 356.088-mile-long (573.068 km) United States Numbered Highway in the state of Georgia. It travels south-to-north through the western part of the state near the Alabama state line in Columbus, Georgia. The whole route is Governor's Road Improvement Program (GRIP) corridor EDS-27, providing the bulk of the Tallahassee, Florida–Chattanooga, Tennessee corridor. All of US 27 in Georgia runs concurrently with State Route 1 (SR 1) and is also designated as the Martha Berry Highway. It connects Bainbridge, Colquitt, Blakely, Cuthbert, Lumpkin, Cusseta, Columbus, LaGrange, Carrollton, Bremen, Cedartown, Rome, Summerville, LaFayette, Fort Oglethorpe, and Rossville.

== Route description ==
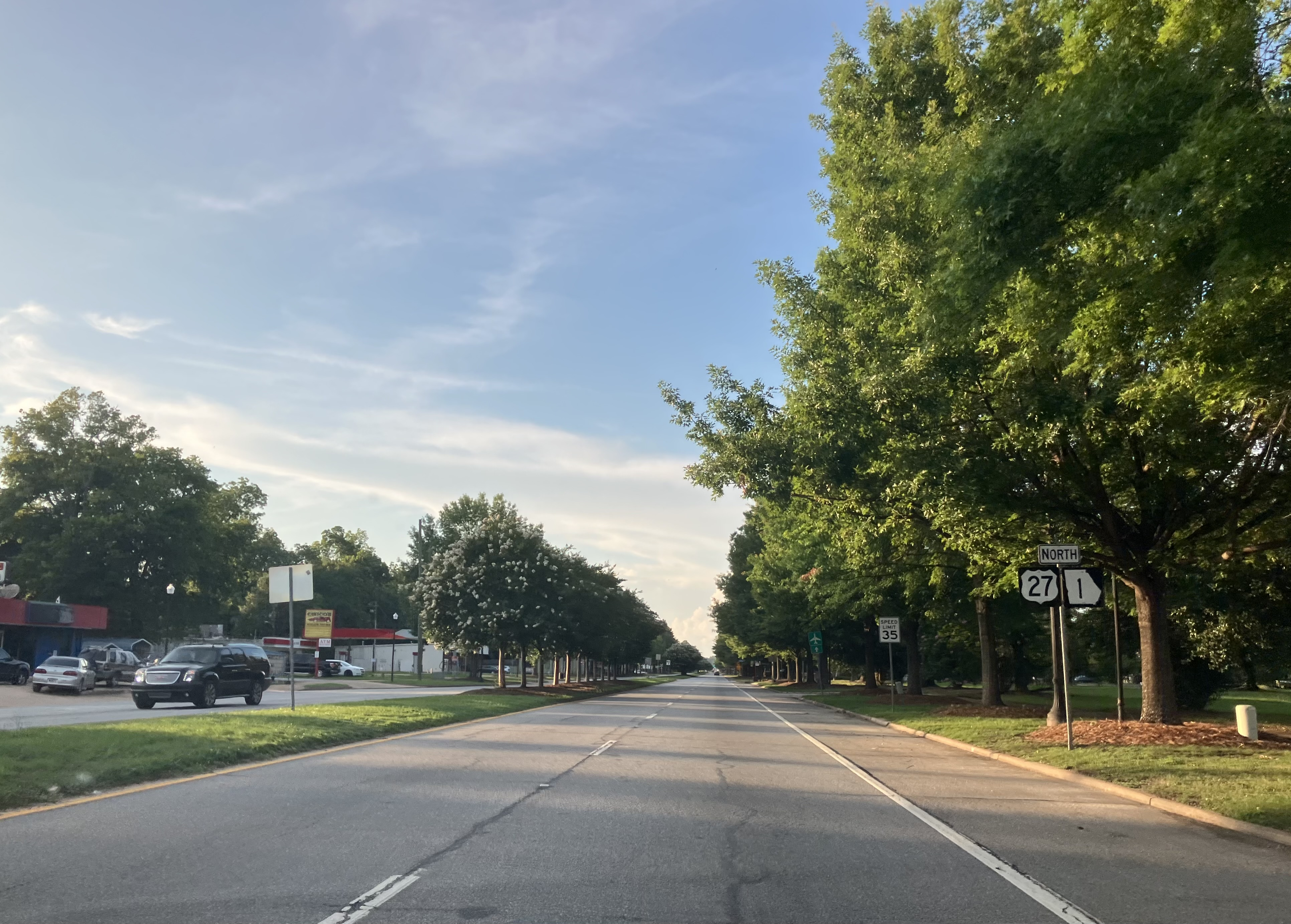
US 27 and SR 1 in Columbus

US 27 starts at the Florida state line, where Decatur and Grady counties meet and where US 27 continues south into Florida. US 27 heads northwest through rural southwestern Georgia, crossing into Decatur County as a four-lane divided highway, and passes Attapulgus to the east on its way to Bainbridge. South of Bainbridge, US 27 meets and travels concurrent with US 84/SR 38 and forms a controlled-access perimeter highway around the southern and western portion of the city, before splitting to the northwest into Miller County and through Colquitt into Early County and Blakely.

Now heading north, the highway travels through Bluffton in Clay County, then reaches Cuthbert in Randolph County, again passing the town to its east. US 27 reaches Lumpkin in Stewart County as its next destination. Still heading north, the highway reaches Cusseta in Chattahoochee County, where it travels concurrently with US 280 and SR 520 into Columbus in Muscogee County. The highways head northwest into Columbus and cross Interstate 185 (I-185). Then, US 27 splits from US 280/SR 520 just before reaching the Alabama state line and heads north through Downtown Columbus, crossing I-185 once again, just before also crossing US 80/SR 22/SR 540 on its way into Harris County.

US 27 roughly parallels I-185 on its trek north through Harris County and crosses I-185 once more shortly after crossing into Troup County, where it also crosses I-85 just south of LaGrange. The highway continues north, traveling through Heard County, and heads through the heart of Carrollton in Carroll County. Angling northwest, the highway crosses I-20 south of Bremen and makes its way in a northerly direction through Haralson County into Polk County, where it travels through the eastern part of Cedartown. Entering Floyd County, US 27 briefly becomes a controlled-access highway with exits serving Darlington Drive/Old Lindale Road, Dean Avenue (SR 101), and East 12th Street. Continuing through Rome as Turner McCall and Martha Berry boulevards, the highway then angles west toward Chattooga County and Summerville. Turning sharply north again in Summerville, the highway travels through LaFayette in Walker County. At this point, US 27 becomes LaFayette Road and then passes back and forth twice between Walker and Catoosa counties, before meeting its northern terminus at the Tennessee state line in Rossville.

The following portions of US 27/SR 1 in Georgia are part of the National Highway System, a system of routes determined to be the most important for the nation's economy, mobility, and defense:

- From the southern terminus at the Florida state line to the southern terminus of US 27 Business (US 27 Bus.)/SR 1 Bus., southeast of Attapulgus.
- From the northern terminus of US 27 Bus./SR 1 Bus., north-northwest of Attapulgus, to the southern terminus of US 27 Bus./SR 1 Bus. in Blakely.
- From the northern terminus of US 27 Bus./SR 1 Bus., in Blakely, to the interchange with US 80/SR 22/SR 540 eastbound in Columbus, which is also the eastern terminus of Double Churches Road.
- From I-185 southeast of LaGrange to the southern terminus of US 27 Bus./SR 1 Bus. in Bremen.
- From the northern terminus of US 27 Bus./SR 1 Bus., north-northwest of Bremen, to the southern terminus of US 27 Bus./SR 1 Bus., southeast of Buchanan.
- From the northern terminus of US 27 Bus./SR 1 Bus., north of Buchanan, to the northern terminus at the Tennessee state line.

== History ==
=== 1920s to 1950s ===
SR 1 was established at least as early as 1919, traveling on mostly the same path as it does today, with the following differences: the southern terminus at the Florida state line was southeast of Bainbridge; it traveled through Brinson and then northward to Colquitt; from Colquitt, it traveled through Edison, and into Cuthbert; and, from LaFayette, it traveled northwest to Trenton, then northeast to the Tennessee state line. By the end of 1921, the southern terminus was shifted west to a point south-southeast of Bainbridge. It was shifted east out of Brinson to a direct path from Bainbridge to Colquitt. The Colquitt–Cuthbert segment was shifted westward to travel through Blakely. At this time, the northern terminus was truncated to LaFayette. SR 53 was proposed just east of LaFayette, and an unnumbered road was built north-northwest to Fort Oglegthorpe and then north to Tennessee. By the end of 1930, US 41W was designated on SR 1 from Rome to LaFayette and possibly on the LaFayette–Tennessee segment of the unnumbered road. By the end of 1931, US 280 was designated on the Cusseta–Columbus segment. By the end of 1934, US 41W was decommissioned, and US 27 was designated on the entire length of SR 1. By the end of 1939, the entire length of US 27/SR 1 from Florida to just south of the Clay–Randolph county line was completed. Between the beginning of 1945 and November 1946, SR 1's path south-southwest of Rome was shifted eastward. Its former path on US 27 was redesignated as SR 1 Spur. Between the beginning of 1940 and the beginning of 1954, US 27/SR 1's path north of Trion was proposed to be shifted to a more eastern alignment. Between June 1954 and June 1955, SR 1's path south-southwest of Rome was reverted to its original path, replacing SR 1 Spur. Its former path was redesignated as SR 1E. Between the beginning of 1953 and the beginning of 1960, SR 1 was rerouted on a more direct path between Amsterdam and Attapulgus. This new path had a "soil surface".

=== 1960s ===
Between July 1957 and June 1960, SR 1 was proposed to be rerouted on an eastern bypass of Summerville, from a point east-southeast of the city to Trion. Between 1957 and 1962, a southwestern bypass of the main part of Carrollton was proposed from US 27/SR 1 in the southern part of the city to US 27/SR 1/SR 166 in the west-central part. Between 1953 and 1964, the northern terminus of SR 1 Spur was truncated to its original northern terminus, an intersection with US 27/US 280/SR 1 north of Fort Benning. The former path of SR 1 Spur north of US 27/US 280/SR 1 on Fort Benning Road was redesignated as SR 357. Its path on Cusseta Road and Brown Avenue was redesignated as SR 103 Spur. US 280's path through Columbus was shifted onto SR 1 Spur. A freeway in the eastern part of Columbus was under construction from US 27/US 280/SR 1 southeast of Columbus to SR 357 (Buena Vista Road) in the eastern part of the city. It was proposed to be designated from that point to US 27/SR 1 south-southwest of Nankipooh. Between 1954 and 1965, SR 48 was extended eastward on US 27 to the southern terminus of SR 1's proposed eastern bypass of Summerville. SR 114 was extended north-northeast on US 27 to the northern terminus of this bypass. Between 1960 and 1965, US 27 (and possibly SR 1) in the Bainbridge area was shifted onto a freeway-grade bypass of the main part of the city, designated as SR 38 Loop. Its former path was redesignated as US 27 Bus. (and possibly SR 1 Bus.). Between June 1963 and the end of 1965, SR 1 was proposed to be rerouted on a southwestern bypass of Cusseta, from south of the city to west of it. Between 1962 and 1967, SR 1 (and possibly US 27) was shifted onto the bypass of Carrollton. In 1966, the freeway in Columbus was proposed to be part of an eastward rerouting of SR 1. Its former path through Columbus was redesignated as SR 1 Bus. SR 1 was proposed to be designated on an under-construction bypass south of the main part of Rome, from US 27/US 411/SR 53 north-northeast of Six Mile to US 411/SR 101/SR 344 south-southeast of Rome. The northern terminus of SR 1's proposed Summerville bypass was shifted to a point east-northeast of Trion. The next year, 1967, the SR 1 freeway was under construction from SR 357 north to US 27/SR 1. US 80 in Columbus was shifted southeastward, onto US 27/SR 1, then on US 280 and the newer SR 1 Spur. In 1968, US 27/US 411/SR 1 was shifted onto SR 1's southern bypass of Rome. Between 1964 and 1970, the SR 1 freeway was completed to Airport Thruway in the northern part of Columbus.

=== 1970s and 1980s ===
In 1971, SR 1's path in LaGrange was shifted westward, replacing SR 1 Spur. The next year, 1972, US 27/SR 1, as well as SR 55, was shifted onto the southwestern bypass of Cusseta. In 1975, the SR 1 freeway in Columbus was redesignated as I-185 (with the unsigned SR 411 designation). SR 1 was shifted onto its former path through the city, replacing all of SR 1 Bus. The next year, SR 38 Loop in Bainbridge was decommissioned. SR 38 was designated on SR 38 Loop's former path. SR 38 through the city was redesignated as SR 38 Bus. In 1977, the Summerville bypass of SR 1 was canceled, with SR 48 and SR 114 reverted to their previous alignments. Five years later, in 1982, an eastern bypass of LaFayette, designated as SR 730, was proposed from southeast of the city to north-northeast of it. In 1987, an eastern bypass of Cedartown, designated as SR 744, was proposed from south-southwest of the city to north-northeast of it. The next year, SR 55 and the newer SR 1 Spur were redesignated as part of SR 520. US 80 in Columbus was shifted north, off of US 280/SR 520. A western bypass of Bremen, designated as SR 793, was proposed from south-southwest of the city to north-northwest of it. US 27/SR 1 in the LaFayette area was shifted eastward, onto the path of SR 730. Its former path was redesignated as US 27 Bus./SR 1 Bus. In 1989, an eastern bypass of Attapulgus, designated as SR 831, was proposed from east-southeast of the city, to north-northwest of it. SR 811 was proposed from US 27/SR 1 south-southeast of Buchanan north-northwest across it and curved around the eastern side of the city to a point north-northwest of it.

=== 1990s and 2000s ===
In 1991, US 27/SR 1 in the Cedartown area was shifted eastward, onto the path of SR 744, with US 278/SR 6, which was also shifted out of the main part of the city. The former path of US 27/SR 1 was redesignated as US 27 Bus./SR 1 Bus. The next year, an eastern bypass of Blakely, designated as SR 838, was proposed from south-southeast of the city to north-northeast of it. US 27/SR 1 was rerouted onto the proposed path of SR 811 and shifted east of Buchanan. The former path of US 27/SR 1 in the Buchanan area was redesignated as US 27 Bus./SR 1 Bus. The southern half of SR 793 in the Bremen area was built from US 27/SR 1 just north of I-20 to US 78/SR 8 in the city. In 1993, US 27/SR 1 in the Blakely area was shifted eastward, onto the path of SR 838. Its former path was redesignated as US 27 Bus./SR 1 Bus. A southeastern bypass of Cuthbert, designated SR 847, was proposed from south-southwest of the city to north-northeast of it. US 27/SR 1 in the Bremen area was shifted westward, onto the path of SR 793. Its former path was redesignated as US 27 Bus./SR 1 Bus. In 1994, US 27/SR 1 in the Cuthbert area was shifted eastward, onto the path of SR 847. Its former path was redesignated as US 27 Bus./SR 1 Bus. That same year, a western bypass of the Chickamauga and Chattanooga National Military Park, designated SR 813, was proposed from US 27/SR 1 east-northeast of Chickamauga to SR 2 west-southwest of Fort Oglethorpe. The next year, US 27/SR 1 was shifted onto the path of SR 831. Its former path was redesignated as SR 1 Bus. In 2001, US 27/SR 1's path through the Chickamauga and Chattanooga National Military Park was shifted westward, onto the path of SR 813.

=== Designations ===
In 1935, the Georgia General Assembly designated the portion of US 27/SR 1 from Columbus to its northern terminus as "Tennessee-Columbus Military Highway".

In 1941, the Georgia General Assembly designated the portion of US 27/SR 1 from its southern terminus to Colquitt as the "De Soto Trail Highway".

In 1952, the Georgia General Assembly designated the entirety of US 27/SR 1 as the "Martha Berry Highway", honoring a pioneer in education.

In 1992, the Georgia General Assembly designated the portion of US 27/SR 1 from the Chattahoochee–Muscogee county line to its intersection with I-185 as the "Robert B. Nett Medal of Honor Highway", honoring a hero of World War II.

In 1993, the Georgia General Assembly designated the US 27/SR 1 bypass around Cedartown as the "Syble W. Brannan Parkway", honoring a prominent Cedartown resident.

In 1994, the Georgia General Assembly designated the portion of the US 27/SR 1 between Summerville and Trion in Chattooga County as the "Ralph 'Country' Brown Highway", honoring a prominent Chattooga resident and baseball player.

In 2000, the Georgia General Assembly designated the US 27/SR 1 bypass around Cuthbert as the "Gerald Green Bypass", honoring a prominent resident of Georgia and member of the Georgia General Assembly.

In 2011, the Georgia General Assembly designated the entirety of US 27/SR 1 as the "Scenic Hometown Highway", for "tourism enhancement purposes". Also in 2011, with the same designation, the portion of US 27/SR 1 between Shields Crossing (near Chickamauga) was designated as the "Roy Parrish Parkway", honoring a prominent resident of Walker County.

== Major intersections ==
County	Location	mi	km	Destinations	Notes
Decatur		0.000	0.000	US 27 south (SR 63) / SR 1 begins – Tallahassee	South end of SR 1 concurrency; southern terminus of SR 1; US 27 continues into Florida concurrent with FL SR 63
Decatur		1.227	1.975	SR 262 north – Climax	Southern terminus of SR 262
Decatur		6.347	10.215	US 27 Bus. north / SR 1 Bus. north to SR 241 – Attapulgus	Southern terminus of US 27 Bus./SR 1 Bus.
Decatur		9.223	14.843	US 27 Bus. south / SR 1 Bus. south to SR 241 – Attapulgus	Northern terminus of US 27 Bus./SR 1 Bus.
Decatur	Bainbridge	18.627	29.977	US 84 east / SR 38 east / US 27 Bus. north / SR 1 Bus. north (South Tallahassee Road) – Cairo, Bainbridge, Bainbridge College, Historical District	Interchange; south end of US 84/SR 38 concurrency; southern terminus of US 27 Bus./SR 1 Bus.
Decatur	Bainbridge	19.239– 19.436	30.962– 31.279	SR 97 (Faceville Highway) / SR 309 – Fowlstown, Faceville	Interchange
Decatur	Bainbridge	20.409	32.845	US 84 Bus. east / SR 38 Bus. east (Shotwell Street) / South Old Quincy Road south / Boat Basin Circle west – Bainbridge	Interchange; western terminus of US 84 Bus./SR 38 Bus.; northern terminus of South Old Quincy Road; eastern terminus of Boat Basin Circle; South Old Quincy Road is former SR 97 Conn.
Decatur	Bainbridge	21.079	33.923	SR 253 (Spring Creek Road)	Interchange
Decatur	Bainbridge	21.767	35.031	US 84 west (SR 38 west) / US 27 Bus. south (SR 1 Bus. south) to SR 253 Spur – Bainbridge, Donalsonville, Dothan, AL	Interchange; north end of US 84/SR 38 concurrency; northern terminus of US 27 Bus./SR 1 Bus.
Miller	Colquitt	40.396	65.011	SR 310 south (Grow Street) – Brinson	Northern terminus of SR 310
Miller	Colquitt	40.602	65.343	SR 91 Spur north / SR 45 Truck north / SR 91 Truck north (Fourth Street)	South end of SR 45 Truck/SR 91 Truck concurrency; southern terminus of SR 91 Spur
Miller	Colquitt	41.123	66.181	SR 45 Conn. north (First Street)	Southern terminus of SR 45 Conn.
Miller	Colquitt	41.330	66.514	SR 45 north / SR 91 north (College Street) – Arlington, Newton	North end of SR 45 Truck/SR 91 Truck concurrency; south end of SR 45/SR 91 concurrency
Miller	Colquitt	42.539	68.460	SR 45 south / SR 91 south – Iron City, Donalsonville	North end of SR 45/SR 91 concurrency
Early	Blakely	59.038	95.012	US 27 Bus. north / SR 1 Bus. north (South Main Street) – Blakely	Southern terminus of US 27 Bus./SR 1 Bus.
Early	Blakely	60.297	97.039	SR 200 (Damascus Street) – Blakely, Damascus	
Early	Blakely	60.658	97.620	SR 62 (Magnolia Street) – Columbia, Arlington, Blakely	
Early	Blakely	61.434	98.868	SR 62 Byp. (Martin Luther King Jr. Boulevard) to SR 39 north – Blakely	
Early	Blakely	62.699	100.904	US 27 Bus. south / SR 1 Bus. south (North Main Street) – Blakely, Kolomoki Mounds State Park	Northern terminus of US 27 Bus./SR 1 Bus.
Clay	Suttons Corner	77.177	124.204	SR 37 – Fort Gaines, Edison	
Randolph	Cuthbert	88.205	141.952	US 27 Bus. north / SR 1 Bus. north – Cuthbert, Andrew College, Historic District	Southern terminus of US 27 Bus./SR 1 Bus.
Randolph		88.568	142.536	SR 216 south – Carnegie, Edison, Arlington	Northern terminus of SR 216
Randolph		90.398	145.481	US 82 / SR 50 – Cuthbert, Shellman, Dawson, Andrew College	
Randolph		92.326	148.584	US 27 Bus. south / SR 1 Bus. south – Cuthbert	Northern terminus of US 27 Bus./SR 1 Bus.
Stewart	Lumpkin	110.740	178.219	SR 27 – Georgetown, Richland, Lumpkin	
Stewart	Lumpkin	111.063	178.739	SR 39 Conn. – Providence Canyon State Park, Florence Marina State Park	
Stewart	Lumpkin	111.744	179.835	SR 1 Conn. south – Lumpkin	Northern terminus of SR 1 Conn.
Stewart		118.320	190.418	SR 39 west – Omaha, Florence Marina State Park, Kirbo Educational Center	
Chattahoochee	Cusseta	129.748	208.809	US 280 east / SR 520 east – Richland, Albany	South end of US 280/SR 520 concurrency
Chattahoochee	Cusseta	130.732	210.393	Broad Street	Former SR 520 Bus. east
Chattahoochee	Fort Benning	131.261	211.244	SR 26 east – Buena Vista, Camp Darby, Andersonville National Historic Site	Western terminus of SR 26
Chattahoochee	Fort Benning	136.526	219.717	8th Division Road Access Point	Interchange
Muscogee	Fort Benning	140.569	226.224	Custer Road – Sand Hill, 192nd & 198th	Interchange
Muscogee	Fort Benning	141.314	227.423	I-185 north (SR 411) – Fort Benning, LaGrange, Airport	I-185 exit 1
Muscogee	Columbus	146.742	236.158	US 280 west / SR 520 west (4th Street) – Phenix City, Alabama	North end of US 280/SR 520 concurrency
Muscogee	Columbus	147.908	238.035	SR 22 Spur east (13th Street) – Phenix City, Talbotton	Western terminus of SR 22 Spur
Muscogee	Columbus	148.040	238.247	SR 85 north (14th Street)	Southern terminus of SR 85
Muscogee	Columbus	149.713	240.940	SR 219 north (River Road)	Southern terminus of SR 219
Muscogee	Columbus	150.650	242.448	US 27 Alt. north / SR 85 (Manchester Expressway) to I-185 – Waverly Hall, Columbus Tech	Southern terminus of US 27 Alt.
Muscogee	Columbus	153.829	247.564	US 80 / SR 22 (J.R. Allen Parkway) / SR 540 (Fall Line Freeway) to I-185 – Phenix City, Macon	US 80/SR 22 exit 4
Harris	Cataula	163.347	262.882	SR 315 east – Ellerslie	South end of SR 315 concurrency
Harris	Cataula	163.457	263.059	SR 315 west to I-185	North end of SR 315 concurrency
Harris	Kingsboro	166.944	268.670	SR 208 east – Waverly Hall	Western terminus of SR 208
Harris	Hamilton	171.294	275.671	SR 116 west – West Point	South end of SR 116 concurrency
Harris	Hamilton	171.425	275.882	SR 116 east – Shiloh	North end of SR 116 concurrency
Harris		175.309	282.132	SR 190 east – Warm Springs, Manchester	Western terminus of SR 190
Harris	Pine Mountain	178.406	287.117	SR 354 / SR 18 Truck west to I-185 – West Point, FDR State Park, Liberty Bell Pool	South end of SR 18 Truck concurrency
Harris	Pine Mountain	179.388	288.697	SR 18 west (Harris Street) – West Point	North end of SR 18 Truck concurrency; south end of SR 18 concurrency
Harris	Pine Mountain	179.701	289.201	SR 18 east – Greenville, Warm Springs	North end of SR 18 concurrency
Troup		188.959	304.100	I-185 (SR 411) – Columbus, Atlanta	I-185 exit 42
Troup	LaGrange	193.644	311.640	I-85 (SR 403) – Montgomery, Atlanta	I-85 exit 14
Troup	LaGrange	194.430	312.905	SR 14 Spur (Davis Road) – Whitesville, Hogansville	
Troup	LaGrange	196.251	315.835	SR 219 south (Whitesville Road) – Whitesville	South end of SR 219 concurrency
Troup	LaGrange	196.668	316.506	US 29 south / SR 14 south / SR 109 (LaFayette Parkway) to I-85 – West Point Lake, Greenville	South end of US 29/SR 14 concurrency
Troup	LaGrange	196.720	316.590	SR 219 north / SR 14 Conn. south (Greenville Street) – West Point	North end of SR 219 concurrency
Troup	LaGrange	197.419	317.715	US 29 north / SR 14 north (Commerce Avenue) – Hogansville	North end of US 29/SR 14 concurrency
Troup		207.489	333.921	SR 54 east – Hogansville	Western terminus of SR 54
Heard		211.871	340.973	SR 100 south – Hogansville	South end of SR 100 concurrency
Heard		214.278	344.847	SR 100 north – Franklin, Bowdon	North end of SR 100 concurrency
Heard	Franklin	216.143	347.848	SR 34 – Franklin, Bowdon, Newnan	Interchange
Carroll	Roopville	228.946	368.453	SR 5 – Roopville, Tyus, Whitesburg	
Carroll	Carrollton	236.695	380.924	US 27 Alt. south / SR 16 east / SR 166 – Bowdon, Atlanta, Newnan, University of West Georgia, West Georgia Technical College	Interchange; south end of SR 16 concurrency; northern terminus of US 27 Alt.
Carroll	Carrollton	237.997	383.019	South Street – Historic Downtown	Interchange
Carroll	Carrollton	238.363	383.608	SR 16 west (Alabama Street) – Mount Zion	North end of SR 16 concurrency
Carroll	Carrollton	239.826	385.963	SR 113 north to I-20 – Temple	Southern terminus of SR 113
Carroll	Carrollton	239.826	385.963	SR 166 Conn. east (Linda Lane) – University of West Georgia	Western terminus of SR 166 Conn.
Carroll	Bremen	247.305	397.999	I-20 (SR 402) – Birmingham, Atlanta	I-20 exit 11
Carroll	Bremen	247.635	398.530	US 27 Bus. north / SR 1 Bus. north – Bremen, Bremen Business District	Southern terminus of US 27 Bus./SR 1 Bus.
Haralson	Bremen	249.189	401.031	US 78 / SR 8 – Tallapoosa, Waco, Bremen	
Haralson		252.195	405.869	US 27 Bus. south / SR 1 Bus. south – Bremen	Northern terminus of US 27 Bus./SR 1 Bus.
Haralson		254.833	410.114	US 27 Bus. north / SR 1 Bus. north (Cedartown Street) – Buchanan, Buchanan Business District	Southern terminus of US 27 Bus./SR 1 Bus.
Haralson		255.973	411.949	SR 120 – Buchanan, Dallas	
Haralson		257.285	414.060	US 27 Bus. south / SR 1 Bus. south – Buchanan, Buchanan Business District	Northern terminus of US 27 Bus./SR 1 Bus.
Polk		269.089	433.057	SR 100 south – Tallapoosa	South end of SR 100 concurrency
Polk	Cedartown	271.122	436.329	US 27 Bus. north / SR 1 Bus. north (South Main Street) – Cave Spring, Cedartown Business District	Southern terminus of US 27 Bus./SR 1 Bus.
Polk	Cedartown	272.330	438.273	US 278 west / SR 6 west / SR 100 north (MLK Jr. Boulevard) – Cedartown	North end of SR 100 concurrency; south end of US 278/SR 6 concurrency
Polk	Cedartown	274.077	441.084	US 278 east / SR 6 east – Rockmart	Interchange; north end of US 278/SR 6 concurrency
Polk	Cedartown	276.346	444.736	US 27 Bus. south / SR 1 Bus. south (North Main Street) – Cedartown, Cedartown Business District	Northern terminus of US 27 Bus./SR 1 Bus.
Floyd		285.227	459.028	SR 1 Loop west	Interchange
Floyd	Six Mile	286.004	460.279	US 411 south / SR 53 west – Cave Spring, Centre, AL, Gadsden, AL, Georgia School for the Deaf	South end of US 411 and SR 53 concurrencies
Floyd	Rome	289.799	466.386	Darlington Drive / Old Lindale Road – Georgia Northwestern Technical College	Interchange
Floyd	Rome	290.292	467.180	Maple Road	Interchange; southbound exit and northbound entrance
Floyd	Rome	290.595	467.667	US 411 north / SR 20 east to SR 101 (Dean Avenue) – Cartersville, Atlanta, Rockmart	Interchange; north end of US 411 concurrency; south end of SR 20 concurrency
Floyd	Rome	291.539	469.187	SR 101 (East 2nd Avenue) / East 12th Street – Rockmart	Interchange
Floyd	Rome	292.872	471.332	SR 53 east (MLK Boulevard) – Calhoun, Shannon	North end of SR 53 concurrency
Floyd	Rome	292.940	471.441	SR 293 south (Broad Street) – Kingston	Northern terminus of SR 293
Floyd	Rome	293.994	473.137	SR 20 west (Turner McCall Boulevard) / SR 101 south (Martha Berry Boulevard) – Coosa, Centre, AL, Rockmart, Shorter University	North end of SR 20 concurrency
Floyd	Rome	295.345	475.312	SR 1 Loop (Veterans Memorial Highway) to SR 20 – Baseball Stadium, Chieftains Museum Major Ridge Home, Redmond Regional Medical Center	
Floyd	Armuchee	302.796	487.303	SR 140 east – Adairsville	Western terminus of SR 140
Floyd		303.603	488.602	SR 156 east – Calhoun	Western terminus of SR 156
Chattooga	Summerville	316.608	509.531	SR 100 south / SR 114 west (Lyerly Highway) – Lyerly	Northern terminus of SR 100; eastern terminus of SR 114
Chattooga	Summerville	316.695	509.671	SR 48 west – Menlo	Eastern terminus of SR 48
Walker		325.904	524.492	SR 151 north to I-75 – Ringgold	Southern terminus of SR 151
Walker		331.061	532.791	SR 337 south (Shattuck Industrial Boulevard)	Northern terminus of SR 337
Walker	LaFayette	332.808	535.603	US 27 Bus. north / SR 1 Bus. north – LaFayette, Airport	Southern terminus of US 27 Bus./SR 1 Bus.
Walker	LaFayette	333.578	536.842	SR 136 east / SR 193 north – LaFayette, Calhoun, Hutcheson Medical Center	South end of SR 136 concurrency; southern terminus of SR 193
Walker	LaFayette	336.053	540.825	US 27 Bus. south / SR 1 Bus. south	Northern terminus of US 27 Bus./SR 1 Bus.
Walker	LaFayette	336.507	541.556	SR 136 west – Trenton, Cloudland Canyon State Park	North end of SR 136 concurrency
Walker	Rock Spring	342.097	550.552	SR 95 south – Catlett	Northern terminus of SR 95
Catoosa	No major junctions				
Walker	Fairview	352.348	567.049	SR 2 west – Lookout Mountain	Interchange; south end of SR 2 concurrency
Catoosa	Fort Oglethorpe	353.136	568.317	SR 2 east (Battlefield Parkway) to I-75 – Ringgold	North end of SR 2 concurrency
Catoosa	Fort Oglethorpe	353.723	569.262	SR 146 east (Cloud Springs Road) – Ringgold	James H. Chandler Memorial Intersection
Walker	Rossville	356.088	573.068	US 27 north (Rossville Boulevard / SR 27 / SR 29) / SR 1 ends – Chattanooga	North end of SR 1 concurrency; northern terminus of SR 1; US 27 continues into Tennessee concurrent with TN SR 27
1.000 mi = 1.609 km; 1.000 km = 0.621 mi: Concurrency terminus

== See also ==
- Special routes of U.S. Route 27

U.S. Route 27
Previous state: Florida	Georgia	Next state: Tennessee
