= National Register of Historic Places listings in Haralson County, Georgia =

This is a list of properties and districts in Haralson County, Georgia that are listed on the National Register of Historic Places (NRHP).

This National Park Service list is complete through NPS recent listings posted May 1, 2026.

== Current listings ==
	Name on the Register	Image	Date listed	Location	City or town	Description
1	Haralson County Courthouse	Haralson County Courthouse	June 7, 1974 (#74000688)	Courthouse Sq. 33°48′06″N 85°11′23″W	Buchanan	
2	North Tallapoosa Residential Historic District		May 9, 2003 (#03000405)	Roughly Centered on int. Bowden St. and Manning ST. 33°45′01″N 85°17′24″W	Tallapoosa	
3	Tallapoosa Commercial Historic District	Tallapoosa Commercial Historic District	May 16, 2016 (#16000246)	Centered on US 78, Head Ave, Odessa St. and RR. 33°44′39″N 85°17′17″W	Tallapoosa	

== See also ==
- List of National Historic Landmarks in Georgia (U.S. state)
- National Register of Historic Places listings in Georgia
