= Georgia State Route 100 =

State highway in Georgia, United States

State Route 100
- Georgia State Route 100 highlighted in red

Route information
- Maintained by GDOT
- Length: 136.5 mi (219.7 km)

Major junctions
- South end: US 27 Alt. / SR 18 / SR 41 / SR 109 in Greenville
- I-85 near Hogansville; US 29 / SR 14 / SR 54 in Hogansville; US 27 / SR 1 near Hogansville; I-20 in Tallapoosa; US 78 / SR 8 in Tallapoosa; US 27 / SR 1 in Cedartown; US 278 / SR 6 in Cedartown; US 411 / SR 53 in Cave Spring
- North end: US 27 / SR 1 / SR 114 in Summerville

Location
- Country: United States
- State: Georgia
- Counties: Meriwether, Troup, Heard, Carroll, Haralson, Polk, Floyd, Chattooga

Highway system
- Georgia State Highway System; Interstate; US; State; Special
← SR 99	→ SR 101

State Route 100 (SR 100) is a 136.5-mile-long (219.7 km) state highway that travels south-to-north through portions of Meriwether, Troup, Heard, Carroll, Haralson, Polk, Floyd, and Chattooga counties in the northwestern part of the U.S. state of Georgia. The route begins at US 27 Alt./SR 18/SR 41/SR 109 in Greenville and ends at US 27/SR 1/SR 114 in Summerville.

== Route description ==
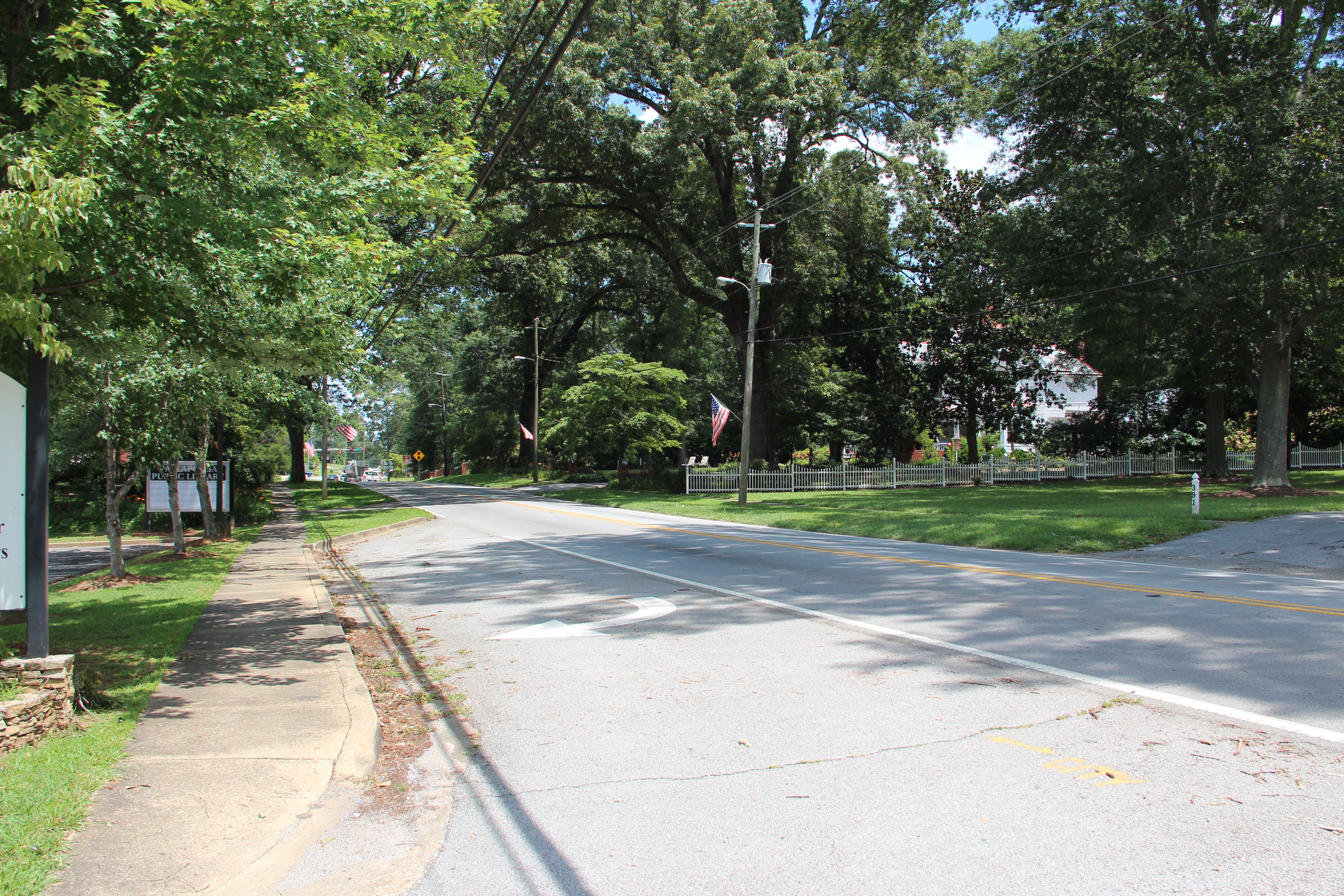
SR 100 in Tallapoosa

SR 100 begins at an intersection with US 27 Alt./SR 18/SR 41/SR 109 in Greenville in Meriwether County. Moving north, SR 100 travels concurrent with SR 54 just east of the interchange with Interstate 85 (I-85) east of Hogansville. Once in Hogansville, SR 100 turns north concurrent with US 29/SR 14 for a short distance before continuing northwest alone. Southeast of Franklin, SR 100 joins US 27/SR 1. Just west of Franklin, SR 100, along with SR 34, splits from US 27 and continues west. In less than 1 mile (1.6 km), SR 100 splits from SR 34 and continues northwest. SR 100 continues north and travels concurrent with SR 5 for a short distance east of the Georgia–Alabama state line before continuing north. As SR 100 moves toward Tallapoosa, it crosses I-20, where it is the first eastbound exit in the state for that highway. Crossing US 78 in Tallapoosa, SR 100 travels concurrent with US 27 south of Cedartown. South of Cedartown, SR 100 turns west following US 278 for a brief distance before resuming a northwestern path. In Cave Spring, SR 100 turns west for a brief distance concurrent with US 411 before turning north once again. SR 100 turns west concurrent with SR 20 for a short distance before resuming its northern course toward Summerville. SR 100 ends at the intersection of US 27/SR 114 in Summerville in Chattooga County.

== Major intersections ==
County	Location	mi	km	Destinations	Notes
Meriwether	Greenville	0.0	0.0	US 27 Alt. south / SR 18 south / SR 41 south / SR 109 west – Warm Springs	Southern terminus
Meriwether		13.2	21.2	SR 54 – Hogansville, Luthersville	Southern end of SR 54 concurrency
Troup		13.8	22.2	I-85 (SR 403) – LaGrange, Atlanta	I-85 exit 28
Troup	Hogansville	16.7	26.9	US 29 south / SR 14 / SR 54 – LaGrange	Northern end of SR 54 concurrency; southern end of US 29/SR 14 concurrency
Troup	Hogansville	17.2	27.7	US 29 north / SR 14 – Grantville	Northern end of US 29/SR 14 concurrency
Heard		27.1	43.6	US 27 south / SR 1 – LaGrange	Southern end of US 27/SR 1 concurrency
Heard		29.5	47.5	US 27 north / SR 1 – Franklin	Northern end of US 27/SR 1 concurrency
Heard	Franklin	29.5	47.5	SR 34 east – Newnan	Southern end of SR 34 concurrency
Heard	Franklin	32.5	52.3	SR 34 west	Northern end of SR 34 concurrency
Carroll		51.0	82.1	SR 5 west	Southern end of SR 5 concurrency
Carroll		51.5	82.9	SR 5 east – Whitesburg	Northern end of SR 5 concurrency
Carroll	Bowdon	56.4	90.8	SR 166 east – Carrollton	Western terminus of SR 166
Haralson		66.3	106.7	SR 16 east – Mount Zion	Western terminus of SR 16
Haralson		67.2	108.1	I-20 (SR 402) – Atlanta, Birmingham	I-20 exit 5
Haralson	Tallapoosa	71.9	115.7	US 78 east / SR 8 – Waco	Southern end of US 78/SR 8 concurrency
Haralson	Tallapoosa	72.1	116.0	US 78 west / SR 8	Northern end of US 78/SR 8 concurrency
Haralson	Tallapoosa	72.8	117.2	SR 120 east – Buchanan	Western terminus of SR 120
Polk		88.9	143.1	US 27 south / SR 1 – Buchanan	Southern end of US 27/SR 1 concurrency
Polk	Cedartown	92.2	148.4	US 27 north / SR 1 north / US 278 east / SR 6 east – Rome	Northern end of US 27/SR 1 concurrency; southern end of US 278/SR 6 concurrency
Polk	Cedartown	93.6	150.6	US 278 west / SR 6 – Piedmont, AL	Northern end of US 278/SR 6 concurrency
Floyd	Cave Spring	104	167	US 411 east / SR 53 (Alabama Street) – Rome	Southern end of US 411/SR 53 concurrency
Floyd	Cave Spring	105	169	US 411 west / SR 53	Northern end of US 411/SR 53 concurrency
Floyd	Coosa	116	187	SR 20 east – Rome	Southern end of SR 20 concurrency
Floyd		119	192	SR 20 west	Northern end of SR 20 concurrency
Chattooga	Summerville	135	217	SR 114 south – Lyerly	Southern end of SR 114 concurrency
Chattooga	Summerville	136	219	US 27 / SR 1 – Summerville	Northern terminus; northern end of SR 114 concurrency
1.000 mi = 1.609 km; 1.000 km = 0.621 mi: Concurrency terminus

== Tallapoosa spur route ==
State Route 100 Spur
- Location: Tallapoosa
- Length: 0.9 mi (1,400 m)

State Route 100 Spur (SR 100 Spur) is a 0.9-mile-long (1.4 km) spur route that exists entirely within the southwestern part of Haralson County. Its routing is entirely within the city limits of Tallapoosa.

It begins in the southern portion of Tallapoosa, at an intersection with the SR 100 mainline (Alewine Avenue). The highway travels to the east-northeast and quickly curves to the northwest. Just past Golf Course Road, the spur curves to the north-northeast and meets its northern terminus, an intersection with US 78/SR 8 (East Atlanta Street) in the eastern part of town.

The entire route is in Tallapoosa, Haralson County.

mi	km	Destinations	Notes
0.0	0.0	SR 100 (Alewine Avenue) – Bowdon	Southern terminus
0.9	1.4	US 78 / SR 8 (East Atlanta Street) – Fruithurst, Bremen	Northern terminus
1.000 mi = 1.609 km; 1.000 km = 0.621 mi
