= Haralson County School District =

School district in Georgia (U.S. state)

Address
- 299 Robertson Avenue Tallapoosa, Georgia, 30176-1232; United States
- Coordinates: 33.798719°N 85.188629°W

District information
- Grades: Pre-school - 12
- Superintendent: Jerry Bell
- Accreditations: Southern Association of Colleges and Schools; Georgia Accrediting Commission

Students and staff
- Students: 3,776
- Teachers: 231

Other information
- Telephone: (770) 574-2500
- Website: http://www.haralson.k12.ga.us/

The Haralson County School District is a public school district in Haralson County, Georgia, United States, based in Tallapoosa. The district includes all of the county except for areas in Bremen. It serves the communities of Buchanan, Tallapoosa, and Waco.

The Haralson County portion of Temple is in the district. As of 2020 no residents lived in that portion of Temple.

== Schools ==
The Haralson County School District has four elementary schools, one middle school, and one high school.

Elementary schools

- Buchanan Elementary School
- Buchanan Primary School
- Tallapoosa Primary School
- West Haralson Elementary School

Secondary schools

- Haralson County Middle School
- Haralson County High School

== Controversies ==
In 2013 a bus driver was fired from the district after writing a Facebook post criticizing the district for allegedly denying school lunch to a student due to insufficient credit. The American Civil Liberties Union (ACLU) filed a lawsuit over the firing in 2014.

== See also ==
- Bremen City School District
