= Georgia State Route 114 =

State highway in Georgia, United States

State Route 114
- SR 114 highlighted in red

Route information
- Maintained by GDOT
- Length: 12.7 mi (20.4 km)

Major junctions
- South end: SR 68 at the Alabama state line southwest of Chattoogaville
- SR 100 in Summerville
- North end: US 27 / SR 1 / SR 100 in Summerville

Location
- Country: United States
- State: Georgia
- Counties: Chattooga

Highway system
- Georgia State Highway System; Interstate; US; State; Special
← SR 113	→ SR 115

State Route 114 (SR 114) is a 12.7-mile-long (20.4 km) state highway located entirely within Chattooga County in the northwestern part of the U.S. state of Georgia.

== Route description ==
The route begins at the Alabama state line as a continuation of Alabama State Route 68. The highway runs parallel to the Chattooga River, going through the towns of Chattoogaville and Lyerly before reaching Summerville. In Summerville, SR 100 has a short concurrency with SR 114 until they both reach their northern terminus at an intersection with US 27/SR 1.

SR 114 is not part of the National Highway System, a system of roadways important to the nation's economy, defense, and mobility.

== Major intersections ==
The entire route is in Chattooga County.

Location	mi	km	Destinations	Notes
Chattoogaville	0.0	0.0	SR 68 west	Continuation into Alabama
Summerville	12.2	19.6	SR 100 south	Southern end of SR 100 concurrency
Summerville	12.7	20.4	US 27 / SR 1 / SR 100	Northern terminus; northern end of SR 100 concurrency
1.000 mi = 1.609 km; 1.000 km = 0.621 mi: Concurrency terminus
