= Georgia State Route 1E =

Former suffixed state route in Floyd County, Georgia, United States

State Route 1E

Route information
- Auxiliary route of SR 1
- Maintained by the State Highway Department of Georgia
- Length: 10.2 mi (16.4 km)
- Existed: 1954–1985

Major junctions
- South end: US 27 / SR 1 south-southwest of Six Mile
- SR 101 Spur in Lindale
- North end: US 27 / US 411 / SR 1 in Rome

Location
- Country: United States
- State: Georgia
- County: Floyd

Highway system
- Georgia State Highway System; Interstate; US; State; Special
← SR 1	→ SR 2

State Route 1E (SR 1E) was a 10.2-mile-long (16.4 km) suffixed state route in Floyd County, Georgia, extending along present-day Old Cedartown Road, Park Avenue, Maple Avenue, East Sixth Street, and 2nd Avenue between intersections with U.S. Route 27/State Route 1 (US 27/SR 1) as well as US 411/SR 53.

== History ==
Originally part of US 27/SR 1, it was originally designated as SR 1 before being reassigned as SR 1E in 1954. US 27/SR 1 had been relocated along former SR 1 Spur, which is present-day US 27/SR 1 from Old Cedartown Road to present-day US 411 in 1938 with the old route remaining as SR 1 through Lindale. When US 27 was upgraded and relocated in 1968 to the Rome Connector, SR 1E was truncated to end at the present-day interchange of Maple Avenue. Essentially a business route for an unincorporated community south of Rome, the state no longer saw the value in retaining an old alignment and transferred control to Floyd County in 1985.

== Major intersections ==
This table shows SR 1E's junctions in 1954. The entire route was in Floyd County.

Location	mi	km	Destinations	Notes
	0.0	0.0	US 27 / SR 1 to US 411 – Cedartown, Rome	Southern terminus
Lindale	5.1	8.2	N First Avenue / SR 101 Spur east to SR 101 south – Rockmart	Western terminus of SR 101 Spur
Rome	9.5	15.3	Second Avenue south to SR 101 south – Rockmart	
Rome	10.2	16.4	US 27 south / SR 1 south / US 411 (SR 53 / Broad Street) – Cartersville, Cedartown US 27 north / SR 1 north / Second Avenue north	Northern terminus; roadway continues as US 27 north / SR 1 north
1.000 mi = 1.609 km; 1.000 km = 0.621 mi
