= Budapest (disambiguation) =

Budapest is the capital of Hungary.

Budapest may also refer to:

== Places ==
- Budapest, Georgia, United States
- Budapest, Missouri, United States

== People with the name ==
- Zsuzsanna Budapest (born 1940), feminist author

== Ships ==
- SMS Budapest, an Austro-Hungarian warship
- Budapest, an Austro-Hungarian cargo ship, seized by the US and renamed USS Kerwood

== Arts, entertainment, and media ==
=== Music ===
- Budapest (band), a British post-grunge rock band, formed 1999
- "Budapest" (song), a 2013 song by George Ezra
- "Budapest", a 1980s song by Jethro Tull from Crest of a Knave
- "Budapest", a 2005 song by Poni Hoax
- Budapest Live, a 1980s live album by Manfred Mann's Earth Band

=== Other uses in arts, entertainment, and media ===
- Budapeste, a 2003 novel by the Brazilian writer Chico Buarque
- Budapest (film), a 2018 French comedy movie by Xavier Gens
- Budapest Gambit, a chess opening that is now rarely played at the top level
