= Mike Garrett (punter) =

American football player (born 1957)

No. 9
- Position: Punter

Personal information
- Born: June 13, 1957 (age 69); Atlanta, Georgia, U.S.
- Listed height: 6 ft 2 in (1.88 m)
- Listed weight: 185 lb (84 kg)

Career information
- High school: Haralson County (Tallapoosa, Georgia)
- College: Georgia (1976–1979)
- NFL draft: 1980: undrafted

Career history
- Seattle Seahawks (1980)*; Baltimore Colts (1981); New York Jets (1982)*
- * Offseason or practice squad member only
- Stats at Pro Football Reference

Michael Steven Garrett (born June 13, 1957) is an American former professional football player who was a punter for the Baltimore Colts of the National Football League (NFL). He played college football for the Georgia Bulldogs.
