= Haralson County High School =

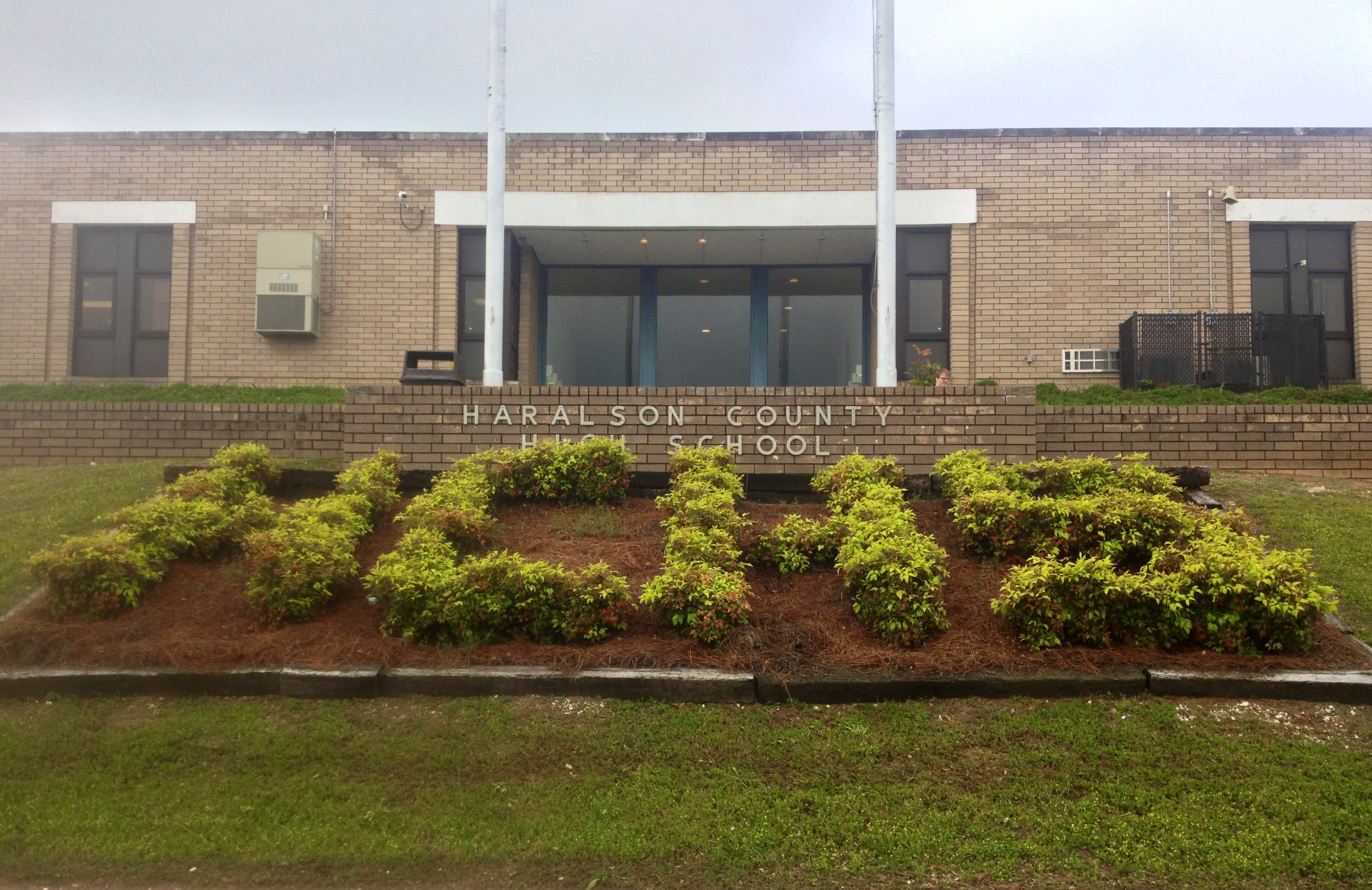
- Haralson County High School Main Building

Location
- 1655 Georgia Highway 120; Tallapoosa, Georgia 30176; United States
- 33.7643°N 85.2441°W

Information
- School type: Public high school
- Established: 1970
- School district: Haralson County School District
- Principal: Vic Coggins
- Teaching staff: 68.90 (FTE)
- Enrollment: 937 (2023–2024)
- Student to teacher ratio: 13.60
- Colors: Blue and gray (Alternate) Blue, gray, and red
- Athletics conference: Georgia High School Association
- Nickname: Rebels
- Rival: Bremen High School
- Website: School website

Haralson County High School is a public high school in Tallapoosa, Georgia, United States.

With the team nickname "Rebels", the school's trophy room of the gym features the Confederate battle flag painted on the wall. In September 2000, someone painted over the gym flag, and students voted 861 to 150 to repaint it. Over 90% of the student demographic body is white as of the 2018–2019 school year.

== Student life ==
Haralson County High School organizations and extracurricular activities include clubs, athletics, and performing arts. In 2007, a fine arts facility was constructed, providing new classrooms for band, chorus, and visual art, as well as a 537-seat auditorium.

=== Athletics ===
Haralson County High School has teams that compete in football, tennis, softball, baseball, volleyball, cross-country, track and field, basketball, and girls' soccer.

=== Performing arts ===
The school has a team that participates in the GHSA Literary Competitionand a troupe that competes in the GHSA One-Act Play Competition. In November 2023, the troupe garnered their first state win in One-Act.

Haralson County High School's band program is a member of the Georgia Music Educators, a state-level affiliate of the National Association for Music Education. The band program consists of the Concert Band, the Symphonic Band, the Marching Rebel Band, and the High Tops Pep Band.

== Elective classes ==
The majority of elective (non-core) classes at Haralson County High School fall into one of four categories — Career, Technical and Agricultural Education (CTAE); Foreign Language; Fine Arts; and Physical Education. CTAE classes are designed so that students can take them as part of a "career pathway," or area of interest, in order to gain job skills in specific fields such as health care, construction, and cosmetology. Students can also complete a pathway in the fine arts or a foreign language; HCHS offers French and Spanish. Students are not required to take specific elective courses, with the exception of Physical Education, which is required by the state of Georgia. All elective courses offered at HCHS can be used to satisfy the elective requirements for the state.

== Notable alumni ==
- Mike Garrett, former NFL punter
