= Budapest, Georgia =

Unincorporated community in Georgia, U.S.

Coordinates: 33°42′54″N 85°13′5″W

Budapest is a small unincorporated community in Haralson County in the U.S. state of Georgia. It is located at an elevation of 1,362 feet (415 m). Budapest is located] on U.S. Route 78, about five miles (8 km) southeast of Tallapoosa.

Budapest is named after the capital city of Hungary.

== History ==
In 1882, real-estate developer Ralph L. Spencer of Essex, Connecticut, invited 200 Hungarian wine-making families then employed in the mining industry in Pennsylvania to settle on 2,000 acres (8.1 km^{2}) of land at this site. Many accepted this offer and were led by a Catholic priest, Father Frances Janisek. They named their larger community Budapest in honor of the capital of Hungary.

A nearby village was named Nutted in honor of a wine-producing region in Hungary. Tokaj was founded to satisfy the desire of brothers Jacob and Paul Estavanko for lots larger than 10 acres (40,000 m^{2}).

A smaller, third village, named Nyitra, was also founded and populated. In 1882 Nyitra was still a part of Hungary. It is located in modern day Slovakia.

Various groups from Ohio and other parts of the United States were attracted to the area and the new industry. The colony quickly flourished into a town with sixty buildings, including a Catholic church, stores and a post office. Soon the sloping hills were garlanded with grape vines. Storage vats were prepared and wineries were planned. It looked as though a new industry had succeeded in the South, but with passage of the Georgia Prohibition Act of 1907, the wine industry fell into ruins. One by one the families were forced to go elsewhere for their livelihood until today there are only one or two of the original families remaining. The wine produced in and around Tallapoosa was sold in the North.

The last of the descendants of the Budapest settlers still living there died in 1964. Besides a cemetery located at the original site, all that today remains of the Hungarian colony is the original 6000 sq/ft mansion built by Father Janisek and the immigrants. It is currently referred by its owners to as Key's Castle, for the man, William Key (a relative of Francis Scott Key), who purchased the house and several vineyard plots from the Hungarians in 1906. The home is still owned by descendants of the Key family. The Estavanko family remained in Haralson County after the demise of the wine industry, and a local road is named after them.
