= North Tallapoosa Residential Historic District =

Historic district in Georgia, United States

- U.S. National Register of Historic Places
- Location within Georgia
- Location: Roughly centered on int. Bowden St. and Manning ST., Tallapoosa, Georgia
- Coordinates: 33°45′01″N 85°17′24″W
- Area: 126 acres (51 ha)
- Built: 1882
- Engineer: Charles D. Camp
- Architectural style: Colonial, Mid 19th Century Revival
- NRHP reference No.: 03000405
- Added to NRHP: May 9, 2003

The North Tallapoosa Residential Historic District, in Tallapoosa, Georgia, is a 126 acres (51 ha) historic district roughly centered on int. Bowden St. and Manning St. The listing included 157 contributing buildings and a contributing site. It also included 71 non-contributing buildings and a non-contributing site.

Included in the district are:

- Tallapoosa Presbyterian Church (c.1891) a Gothic Revival-style church with a corner entrance tower, moved in 1905
- Methodist Episcopal Church (later Pentecostal Holiness Church) (c. 1895–1903), similar, moved in 1915
- Methodist Episcopal Church South (later United Methodist Church) (c. 1918–19), brick Classical Revival
- First Baptist Church (1952), brick Colonial Revival-style
- Tallapoosa High School (1936), later the Tallapoosa Elementary School.

Engineer Charles D. Camp was responsible for the town's 1882 plan.
