= Tallapoosa Commercial Historic District =

Historic district in Georgia, United States

- U.S. National Register of Historic Places
- Location within Georgia
- Location: Roughly centered on US 78, Head Ave., Odessa St., and the railroad, Tallapoosa, Georgia
- Coordinates: 33°44′39″N 85°17′17″W
- Area: 9,999 acres (4,046 ha)
- NRHP reference No.: 16000246
- Added to NRHP: May 16, 2016

The Tallapoosa Commercial Historic District, in Tallapoosa, Georgia, is a 9,999 acres (4,046 ha) historic district roughly centered on U.S. 78, Head Ave., Odessa St. and the railroad. It was listed on the National Register of Historic Places in 2016.

Included in the district.

Engineer Charles D. Camp was responsible for the town's 1882 plan.
