= Jake Verity =

American football player (born 1997)

Profile
- Position: Placekicker

Personal information
- Born: December 23, 1997 (age 28); Bremen, Georgia, U.S.
- Listed height: 6 ft 2 in (1.88 m)
- Listed weight: 197 lb (89 kg)

Career information
- High school: Bremen (Georgia)
- College: East Carolina
- NFL draft: 2021: undrafted

Career history
- Baltimore Ravens (2021)*; Indianapolis Colts (2022)*; Jacksonville Jaguars (2022)*; Tampa Bay Buccaneers (2023)*
- * Offseason or practice squad member only

Awards and highlights
- First-team All-AAC (2018); Second-team All-AAC (2019)
- Stats at Pro Football Reference

Jake Shaw Verity (born December 23, 1997) is an American former professional football placekicker. He played college football at East Carolina and was signed as an undrafted free agent by the Baltimore Ravens in 2021.

== Early life ==
Verity attended Bremen High School in Georgia, where he was credited with a 63-yard field goal on a fair catch kick, the third-longest field goal in Georgia High School Association history.

== College career ==
Verity attended East Carolina University and played for the East Carolina Pirates football team. At East Carolina, he was a two-time All-American Athletic Conference selection, a semi-finalist for the Lou Groza Award in 2019, an award given to the top placekicker in college football, and was East Carolina's all-time leading scorer by the time his collegiate career finished.

Although he had one year of eligibility remaining, Verity opted to enter the 2021 NFL draft.

== Professional career ==
Pre-draft measurables
Height	Weight	Arm length	Hand span
6 ft 1 7/8 in (1.88 m)	197 lb (89 kg)	30 5/8 in (0.78 m)	9 in (0.23 m)
All values from Pro Day

=== Baltimore Ravens ===
After going undrafted in the 2021 NFL draft, Verity signed with the Baltimore Ravens on May 18, 2021. He was waived by the Ravens in the final round of preseason roster cuts on August 31, 2021 and re-signed to their practice squad the next day.

=== Indianapolis Colts ===
On February 8, 2022, the Indianapolis Colts signed Verity to a reserve/future contract. He was waived on August 25, 2022.

=== Jacksonville Jaguars ===
On August 26, 2022, Verity was claimed off waivers by the Jacksonville Jaguars. He was waived/injured on August 31 and placed on injured reserve. He was released on September 6.

=== Tampa Bay Buccaneers ===
On January 25, 2023, Verity signed a reserve/future contract with the Tampa Bay Buccaneers. He was waived on June 7, 2023.
