= Haralson County, Georgia =

County in Georgia, United States

- County
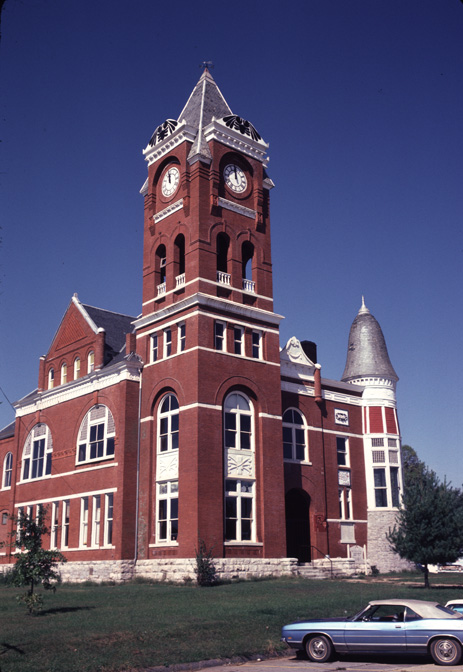
- Former Haralson County Courthouse in Buchanan in 1980

- Location within the U.S. state of Georgia
- Coordinates: 33°47′N 85°13′W
- Country: United States
- State: Georgia
- Founded: January 26, 1856; 170 years ago
- Named for: Hugh A. Haralson
- Seat: Buchanan
- Largest city: Bremen

Area
  - Total: 283 sq mi (730 km^{2})
  - Land: 282 sq mi (730 km^{2})
  - Water: 1.0 sq mi (2.6 km^{2}) 0.4%

Population (2020)
  - Total: 29,919
  - Estimate (2025): 33,066 ▲
  - Density: 106/sq mi (41.0/km^{2})
- Time zone: UTC−5 (Eastern)
  - Summer (DST): UTC−4 (EDT)
- Congressional district: 3rd
- Website: https://www.haralsoncountyga.gov/

Haralson County is a county in the Northwest region of the U.S. state of Georgia. As of the 2020 census, the population was 29,919, up from 28,780 in 2010. The county seat is Buchanan. The county was created on January 26, 1856, and was named for Hugh A. Haralson, a former Georgia congressman.

Haralson County is part of the Atlanta-Sandy Springs-Roswell, GA metropolitan statistical area.

== Geography ==
According to the U.S. Census Bureau, the county has a total area of 283 square miles (730 km^{2}), of which 282 square miles (730 km^{2}) is land and 1.0 square mile (2.6 km^{2}) (0.4%) is water. Much of the county is located within the upper Piedmont region of the state, with a few mountains in the county that are considered part of the foothills of the Appalachian Mountains.

The vast majority of Haralson County is located in the upper Tallapoosa River sub-basin of the ACT River Basin (Coosa-Tallapoosa River Basin). Just the very northwestern corner of the county is located in the Upper Coosa River sub-basin of the same ACT River Basin.

=== Major highways ===
- I-20 / SR 402 (unsigned)
- US 27 / SR 1
  - US 27 Bus. / SR 1 Bus.
- US 78 / SR 8
- SR 16
- SR 100
  - SR 100 Spur
- SR 113
- SR 120

=== Adjacent counties ===
- Polk County - north
- Paulding County - northeast
- Carroll County - south
- Cleburne County, Alabama - west (CST)

== Demographics ==
Historical population
Census	Pop.	Note	%±
1860	3,039		—
1870	4,004		31.8%
1880	5,972		49.2%
1890	11,316		89.5%
1900	11,922		5.4%
1910	13,514		13.4%
1920	14,440		6.9%
1930	13,263		−8.2%
1940	14,377		8.4%
1950	14,663		2.0%
1960	14,543		−0.8%
1970	15,927		9.5%
1980	18,422		15.7%
1990	21,966		19.2%
2000	25,690		17.0%
2010	28,780		12.0%
2020	29,919		4.0%
2025 (est.)	33,066	▲	10.5%
U.S. Decennial Census; 1790-1880 1890-1910; 1920-1930 1930-1940; 1940-1950 1960-1980; 1980-2000 2010 2020

=== Racial and ethnic composition ===
Haralson County, Georgia – racial and ethnic composition Note: the US Census treats Hispanic/Latino as an ethnic category. This table excludes Latinos from the racial categories and assigns them to a separate category. Hispanics/Latinos may be of any race.
Race / ethnicity (NH = Non-Hispanic)	Pop 1980	Pop 1990	Pop 2000	Pop 2010	Pop 2020	% 1980	% 1990	% 2000	% 2010	% 2020
White alone (NH)	16,961	20,381	23,799	26,516	26,825	92.07%	92.78%	92.64%	92.13%	89.66%
Black or African American alone (NH)	1,330	1,426	1,387	1,342	1,253	7.22%	6.49%	5.40%	4.66%	4.19%
Native American or Alaska Native alone (NH)	15	27	62	63	56	0.08%	0.12%	0.24%	0.22%	0.19%
Asian alone (NH)	11	48	84	139	186	0.06%	0.22%	0.33%	0.48%	0.62%
Native Hawaiian or Pacific Islander alone (NH)	x	x	1	2	9	x	x	0.00%	0.01%	0.03%
Other race alone (NH)	18	0	18	21	87	0.10%	0.00%	0.07%	0.07%	0.29%
Mixed-race or multiracial (NH)	x	x	196	379	1,006	x	x	0.76%	1.32%	3.36%
Hispanic or Latino (any race)	87	84	143	318	497	0.47%	0.38%	0.56%	1.10%	1.66%
Total	18,422	21,966	25,690	28,780	29,919	100.00%	100.00%	100.00%	100.00%	100.00%

=== 2020 census ===
As of the 2020 census, the county had a population of 29,919, 11,307 households, and 7,960 families residing in the county.

The median age was 40.3 years, 23.6% of residents were under the age of 18, and 17.2% of residents were 65 years of age or older; for every 100 females there were 94.8 males, and for every 100 females age 18 and over there were 93.4 males age 18 and over. Twenty-four point three percent of residents lived in urban areas, while 75.7% lived in rural areas.

The racial makeup of the county was 90.3% White, 4.2% Black or African American, 0.2% American Indian and Alaska Native, 0.6% Asian, 0.0% Native Hawaiian and Pacific Islander, 0.7% from some other race, and 3.9% from two or more races. Hispanic or Latino residents of any race comprised 1.7% of the population.

Of the 11,307 households in the county, 34.0% had children under the age of 18 living with them, 25.2% had a female householder with no spouse or partner present, about 24.5% were made up of individuals, and 11.8% had someone living alone who was 65 years of age or older.

There were 12,292 housing units, of which 8.0% were vacant. Among occupied housing units, 71.6% were owner-occupied and 28.4% were renter-occupied. The homeowner vacancy rate was 1.3% and the rental vacancy rate was 6.5%.

=== 2010 census ===
As of the 2010 U.S. census, there were 28,780 people, 10,757 households, and 7,820 families living in the county. The population density was 102.0 inhabitants per square mile (39.4/km^{2}). There were 12,287 housing units at an average density of 43.5 per square mile (16.8/km^{2}). The racial makeup of the county was 92.8% white, 4.7% black or African American, 0.5% Asian, 0.2% American Indian, 0.4% from other races, and 1.4% from two or more races. Those of Hispanic or Latino origin made up 1.1% of the population. In terms of ancestry, 37.1% were American, 14.1% were Irish, 11.1% were English, and 6.0% were German.

Of the 10,757 households, 36.6% had children under the age of 18 living with them, 53.8% were married couples living together, 13.3% had a female householder with no husband present, 27.3% were non-families, and 23.2% of all households were made up of individuals. The average household size was 2.64 and the average family size was 3.09. The median age was 38.5 years.

The median income for a household in the county was $38,996 and the median income for a family was $45,339. Males had a median income of $39,452 versus $32,170 for females. The per capita income for the county was $19,033. About 15.6% of families and 20.4% of the population were below the poverty line, including 28.8% of those under age 18 and 16.4% of those age 65 or over.

== Education ==
Public education in the county is largely provided by the Haralson County School District. However, the City of Bremen, which straddles the border of Haralson and Carroll Counties, has the independent Bremen City School District.

== Communities ==
=== Cities ===
- Bremen
- Buchanan (county seat)
- Tallapoosa
- Waco

=== Unincorporated communities ===
- Besma
- Budapest
- Draketown
- Felton
- Mountain View

== Law ==
The county was originally governed by a sole commissioner of Roads and Revenues. The last occupant of this office was Charles Sanders (D). The county is now governed by a five-member board of commissioners, which replaced the single-commissioner form beginning with the term starting in January 2005. The chairman of the board is elected county-wide. The current occupant of this office is Brian L. Walker (R). There are four other commissioners, one elected from each of four geographical districts. The current occupants of these offices are District 1's David Tarpley (R), District 2's Danny Elsberry (R), District 3's Eddie Ivey (R) and District 4's Ryan Farmer (R). The current sheriff of Haralson County is Stacy Williams. Judge J. Edward "Eddie" Hulsey Jr. is the current probate judge.

== Politics and government ==
United States presidential election results for Haralson County, Georgia
Year	Republican		Democratic		Third party(ies)	
Year	No.	%	No.	%	No.	%
1912	19	1.69%	384	34.13%	722	64.18%
1916	137	7.82%	837	47.75%	779	44.44%
1920	1,108	71.67%	438	28.33%	0	0.00%
1924	667	54.01%	447	36.19%	121	9.80%
1928	1,547	69.16%	690	30.84%	0	0.00%
1932	223	14.86%	1,278	85.14%	0	0.00%
1936	787	32.28%	1,643	67.39%	8	0.33%
1940	457	24.60%	1,397	75.19%	4	0.22%
1944	911	42.20%	1,248	57.80%	0	0.00%
1948	457	12.83%	2,263	63.51%	843	23.66%
1952	1,264	35.64%	2,283	64.36%	0	0.00%
1956	2,218	47.29%	2,472	52.71%	0	0.00%
1960	1,869	40.18%	2,783	59.82%	0	0.00%
1964	3,129	58.85%	2,186	41.11%	2	0.04%
1968	1,451	26.51%	771	14.09%	3,251	59.40%
1972	3,460	81.85%	767	18.15%	0	0.00%
1976	1,301	22.24%	4,550	77.76%	0	0.00%
1980	2,229	37.40%	3,606	60.50%	125	2.10%
1984	3,945	67.06%	1,938	32.94%	0	0.00%
1988	4,529	65.17%	2,404	34.59%	17	0.24%
1992	3,142	41.23%	3,281	43.05%	1,198	15.72%
1996	3,260	46.89%	2,850	40.99%	843	12.12%
2000	5,153	63.10%	2,869	35.13%	145	1.78%
2004	7,703	75.45%	2,434	23.84%	72	0.71%
2008	8,658	77.79%	2,248	20.20%	224	2.01%
2012	8,446	81.16%	1,789	17.19%	172	1.65%
2016	9,585	83.79%	1,475	12.89%	379	3.31%
2020	12,330	86.54%	1,791	12.57%	127	0.89%
2024	14,239	87.01%	2,065	12.62%	60	0.37%

United States Senate election results for Haralson County, Georgia2
Year	Republican		Democratic		Third party(ies)	
Year	No.	%	No.	%	No.	%
2020	12,016	85.12%	1,764	12.50%	336	2.38%
2020	10,553	86.76%	1,610	13.24%	0	0.00%

United States Senate election results for Haralson County, Georgia3
Year	Republican		Democratic		Third party(ies)	
Year	No.	%	No.	%	No.	%
2020	6,533	46.76%	1,200	8.59%	6,237	44.65%
2020	10,533	86.63%	1,626	13.37%	0	0.00%
2022	9,789	84.42%	1,498	12.92%	308	2.66%
2022	9,051	86.83%	1,373	13.17%	0	0.00%

Georgia Gubernatorial election results for Haralson County
Year	Republican		Democratic		Third party(ies)	
Year	No.	%	No.	%	No.	%
2022	10,398	89.25%	1,166	10.01%	87	0.75%

As of the 2020s, Haralson County is a strongly Republican voting county, voting 87% for Donald Trump in 2024. For elections to the United States House of Representatives, Haralson County is part of Georgia's 3rd congressional district, currently represented by Brian Jack. For elections to the Georgia State Senate, Haralson County is part of District 30. For elections to the Georgia House of Representatives, Haralson County is part of District 18.

== See also ==
- National Register of Historic Places listings in Haralson County, Georgia
- List of counties in Georgia
