= Bremen City School District =

School district in Georgia (U.S. state)

Address
- 504 Laurel Street Bremen, Georgia, 30110; United States
- Coordinates: 33.717714°N 85.139946°W

District information
- Grades: Pre-school - 12
- Superintendent: Shannon Christian
- Accreditations: Southern Association of Colleges and Schools; Georgia Accrediting Commission

Students and staff
- Students: 1,575
- Teachers: 96

Other information
- Telephone: (770) 537-5508
- Fax: (770) 537-0610
- Website: http://www.bremencs.com/

The Bremen City School District is a public school district in Haralson County and Carroll County, Georgia, United States, based in Bremen.

Its boundary is that of Bremen.

== Schools ==
The Bremen City School District has three elementary schools, one middle school, and one high school.

Elementary schools

- Bremen 4th/5th Academy
- Crossroad Academy
- Jones Elementary

Secondary schools

- Bremen Middle School
- Bremen High School

== See also ==
- Haralson County School District
