= Besma, Georgia =

- Unincorporated community
- Country: United States
- State: Georgia
- List of counties in Georgia: Haralson County
- Time zone: UTC-5 (Eastern (CST))
  - Summer (DST): UTC-5 (EDT)

Besma is an unincorporated community in Haralson County, in the U.S. state of Georgia. It is located 4.5 miles west of Temple, where a post office was in existence in 1897–1898.
