= Leroy Almon =

American painter

- Leroy Almon at his home in Tallapoosa, Georgia, 1995
- Born: 1938; Tallapoosa, Georgia
- Died: 1997 (aged 58–59); Tallapoosa, Georgia
- Known for: Bas relief
- Movement: Modern Art

Leroy Almon (1938–1997) was an American artist known for his woodcarvings and paintings.

== Life ==
Almon was born in Tallapoosa, Georgia and grew up in Ohio. After graduating from high school, he became a show salesman and later, worked for the Coca-Cola Company in Columbus, Ohio. At Gay Tabernacle Baptist Church, Almon met Elijah Pierce. In 1979, Pierce became Almon's artistic mentor. He taught Almon how to carve wood and run the gallery space that Pierce operated out of his barber shop.

Almon married Mary Alice Almon and returned to Tallapoosa in 1982 to restore his childhood home. When Almon returned to Georgia, he became an ordained minister, a nondenominational evangelist, and a police dispatcher.

He died in 1997 of a heart attack.

== Career ==
When Almon returned to Tallapoosa to restore his family's home, he converted the basement into a private studio. Almon exclusively used manual tools to map and carve his woodblocks. "His preliminary sketches would be transferred to softwood panels and carved in low relief with pocketknives and chisels." They would then be painted or adorned with glitter, plastic, beads or other found materials. Christianity was the main focus of Almon's life and artistic work. He has had exhibitions at the Ogden Museum of Southern Art, and various universities

His work is in the permanent collections of the Smithsonian American Art Museum, the American Folk Art Museum, Ackland Art Museum, Minneapolis Institute of Art, the Birmingham Museum of Art the Pérez Art Museum Miami, and the High Museum of Art, Atlanta.
