= Bremen High School (Georgia) =

Location
- 504 Georgia Avenue S. Bremen, Georgia 30110; United States; 33.717681°N 85.14001°W

Information
- School type: Public high school
- School district: Bremen City School District
- Principal: Tim Huff
- Teaching staff: 41.20 (FTE)
- Enrollment: 744 (2024–2025)
- Student to teacher ratio: 18.06
- Colors: Royal blue and white
- Athletics conference: Georgia High School Association
- Nickname: Blue Devils
- Rival: Bowdon High School
- Website: www.bremenhigh.com

Bremen High School is a public high school in Bremen, Georgia, United States. The school's mascot is the Blue Devil.

== Controversies ==
In August 2019, a racist note was found in a student bathroom at the school. The message in the note included references to the racial discrimination that existed in the United States, most notably in the South. Many students at the school reported to local media outlets that the note was "just a part of a larger problem at the Georgia school." Administration officials later claimed after an investigation that the note was a result of a hoax aimed at shining a light on social issues within the school.

== School replacement ==
In February 2021, the school administration announced plans to remove many of the halls that have stood for roughly 70 years, and construct a new state-of-the-art facility. The construction was completed in 2023.

== Notable alumni ==
- Tim Bearden, politician
- Dean Mathis and Mark Mathis, of the pop trio, The Newbeats
- Tom Murphy, politician
- Jake Verity, place kicker for the Baltimore Ravens
