= Buchanan, Georgia =

- City
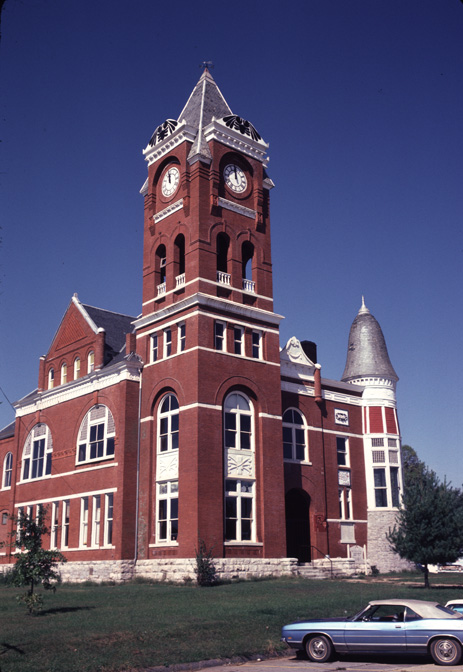
- Former Haralson County courthouse in Buchanan, now the Buchanan-Haralson Public Library

- Location in Haralson County and the state of Georgia
- Coordinates: 33°48′6″N 85°11′1″W
- Country: United States
- State: Georgia
- County: Haralson
- Named after: James Buchanan

Area
  - Total: 1.70 sq mi (4.40 km^{2})
  - Land: 1.49 sq mi (3.86 km^{2})
  - Water: 0.21 sq mi (0.54 km^{2})
- Elevation: 1,243 ft (379 m)

Population (2020)
  - Total: 938
  - Density: 629.8/sq mi (243.15/km^{2})
- Time zone: UTC-5 (Eastern (EST))
  - Summer (DST): UTC-4 (EDT)
- ZIP code: 30113
- Area code: 770
- FIPS code: 13-11616
- GNIS feature ID: 0354892
- Website: buchananga.gov

Buchanan is a city and the county seat of Haralson County, Georgia, United States. As of the 2020 census, Buchanan had a population of 938.

Locally, the city's name is pronounced Buck-HAN-uhn.

== History ==
Buchanan was founded in 1856 as seat of the newly formed Haralson County. It was named for United States President James Buchanan. Buchanan was incorporated as a town in 1857 and as a city in 1902.

The city is home to one of few one-room schoolhouses surviving in Georgia, the Little Creek One-room Schoolhouse. The state had about 7,000 of them in 1900.

== Geography ==
Buchanan is located just east of the center of Haralson County at 33°48′6″N 85°11′1″W (33.801726, -85.183506). U.S. Route 27 bypasses the city to the east, leading north 16 miles (26 km) to Cedartown and south 6 miles (10 km) to Bremen.

According to the United States Census Bureau, Buchanan has a total area of 1.7 square miles (4.4 km^{2}), of which 1.5 square miles (3.8 km^{2}) are land and 0.2 square miles (0.5 km^{2}), or 12.42%, are water.

== Demographics ==
Historical population
Census	Pop.	Note	%±
1880	158		—
1890	324		105.1%
1900	359		10.8%
1910	462		28.7%
1920	491		6.3%
1930	429		−12.6%
1940	504		17.5%
1950	651		29.2%
1960	753		15.7%
1970	800		6.2%
1980	1,019		27.4%
1990	1,009		−1.0%
2000	941		−6.7%
2010	1,104		17.3%
2020	938		−15.0%
U.S. Decennial Census

=== 2020 census ===
Buchanan racial composition
Race	Num.	Perc.
White (non-Hispanic)	802	85.5%
Black or African American (non-Hispanic)	71	7.57%
Asian	2	0.21%
Other/Mixed	44	4.69%
Hispanic or Latino	19	2.03%

As of the 2020 United States census, there were 938 people, 436 households, and 274 families residing in the city.

=== 2000 census ===
As of the census of 2000, there were 941 people, 345 households, and 221 families residing in the city. The population density was 638.6 inhabitants per square mile (246.6/km^{2}). There were 380 housing units at an average density of 257.9 per square mile (99.6/km^{2}). The racial makeup of the city was 87.14% White, 11.37% African American, 0.11% Native American, 0.11% Asian, 0.11% from other races, and 1.17% from two or more races. Hispanic or Latino people of any race were 0.53% of the population.

There were 345 households, out of which 27.0% had children under the age of 18 living with them, 46.1% were married couples living together, 14.8% had a female householder with no husband present, and 35.7% were non-families. 33.6% of all households were made up of individuals, and 17.7% had someone living alone who was 65 years of age or older. The average household size was 2.38 and the average family size was 3.02.

In the city, the population was spread out, with 22.8% under the age of 18, 8.0% from 18 to 24, 28.5% from 25 to 44, 21.5% from 45 to 64, and 19.2% who were 65 years of age or older. The median age was 38 years. For every 100 females, there were 96.9 males. For every 100 females age 18 and over, there were 86.2 males.

The median income for a household in the city was $23,269, and the median income for a family was $26,964. Males had a median income of $24,205 versus $16,458 for females. The per capita income for the city was $11,821. About 20.5% of families and 22.7% of the population were below the poverty line, including 23.4% of those under age 18 and 19.8% of those age 65 or over.

== Education ==
=== Haralson County School District ===
The Haralson County School District includes pre-school to grade twelve, and consists of four elementary schools, a middle school, and a high school. The district has 231 full-time teachers and over 3,766 students.

- Buchanan Elementary School
- Buchanan Primary School
- Tallapoosa Primary School
- West Haralson Elementary School
- Haralson County Middle School
- Haralson County High School
