= Chattoogaville, Georgia =

Chattoogaville
- Unincorporated community
- Location in Georgia Location in the United States
- Coordinates: 34°20′42″N 85°26′49″W
- Country: United States
- State: Georgia
- County: Chattooga

Chattoogaville is an unincorporated community in Chattooga County, in the U.S. state of Georgia. The community lies about 12 miles (19 km) south of the county seat at Summerville.

== History ==
A post office called Chattoogaville was established in 1840, and remained in operation until it was discontinued in 1906. The community takes its name from nearby Chattooga River.
