= Lyerly, Georgia =

- Town
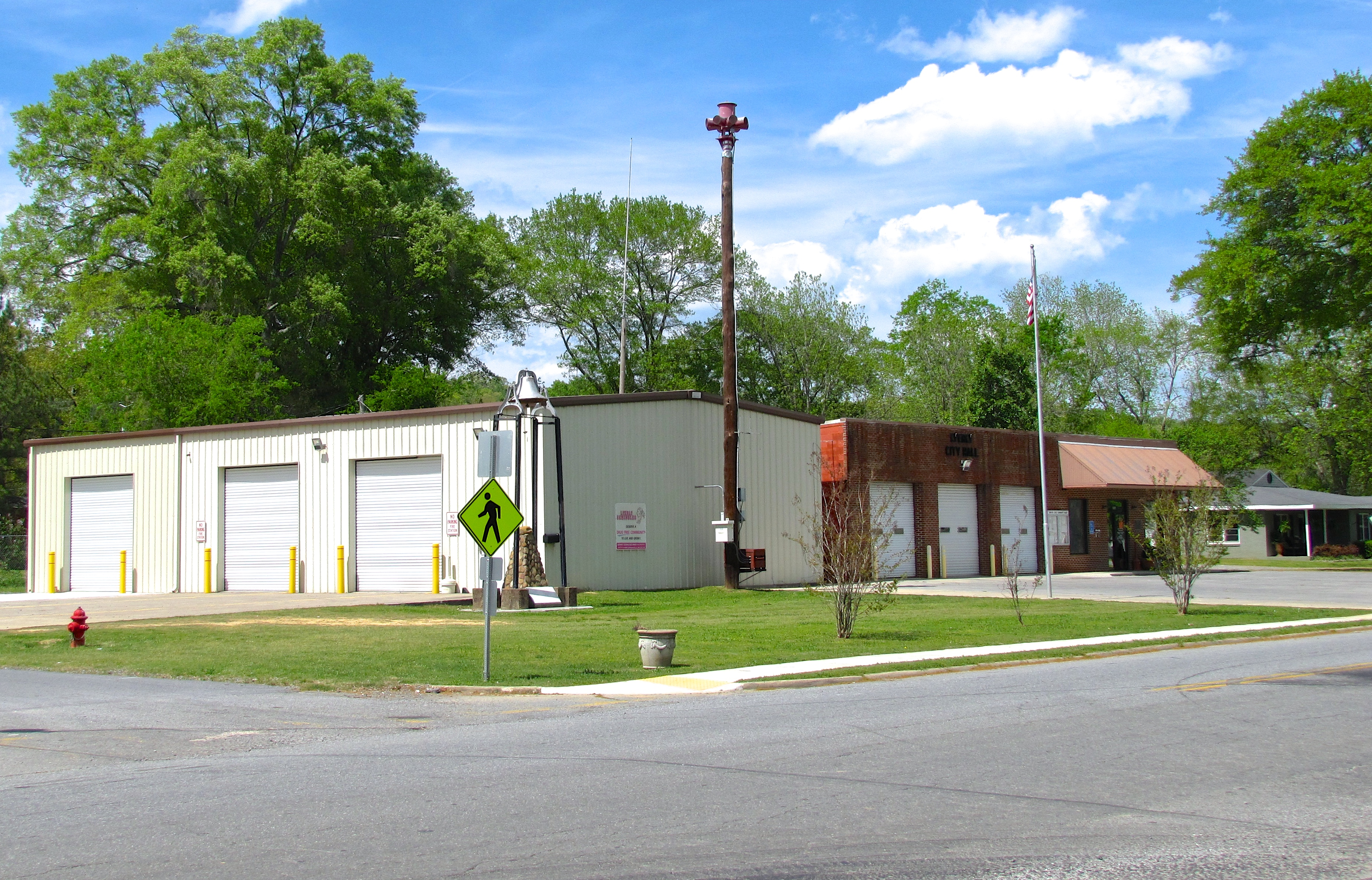
- Lyerly Town Hall

- Logo

- Location in Chattooga County and the state of Georgia
- Coordinates: 34°24′13″N 85°24′23″W
- Country: United States
- State: Georgia
- County: Chattooga

Area
  - Total: 0.75 sq mi (1.95 km^{2})
  - Land: 0.75 sq mi (1.95 km^{2})
  - Water: 0 sq mi (0.00 km^{2})
- Elevation: 630 ft (192 m)

Population (2020)
  - Total: 454
  - Density: 604/sq mi (233.3/km^{2})
- Time zone: UTC-5 (Eastern (EST))
  - Summer (DST): UTC-4 (EDT)
- ZIP code: 30730
- Area codes: 706/762
- FIPS code: 13-48092
- GNIS feature ID: 0332285
- Website: www.lyerlyga.com

Lyerly is a town in Chattooga County, Georgia, United States. As of the 2020 census, the town had a population of 454.

== History ==
A post office called Lyerly has been in operation since 1889, when a small town began to develop around a depot constructed by the Chattanooga, Rome and Columbus Railroad. The post office was moved from the nearby town of Melville, which had gone bankrupt that same year. The new town, which incorporated in 1891, may have been named for Charles A. Lyerly, a banker from Tennessee who had made several real estate investments in the area.

== Geography ==
Lyerly is located in southern Chattooga County at 34°24′13″N 85°24′23″W (34.403717, -85.406474). The Chattooga River, a tributary of the Coosa River, flows along the southeastern edge of the town. Georgia State Route 114 connects Lyerly with Summerville, the county seat, 6 miles (9.7 km) to the northeast, and the Alabama state line (near Gaylesville) 6 miles (9.7 km) to the southwest.

According to the United States Census Bureau, the town has a total area of 0.73 square miles (1.9 km^{2}), all of it land.

== Demographics ==
Historical population
| Census | Pop. | Note | %± |
|---|---|---|---|
| 1900 | 234 | | — |
| 1910 | 322 | | 37.6% |
| 1920 | 323 | | 0.3% |
| 1930 | 296 | | −8.4% |
| 1940 | 368 | | 24.3% |
| 1950 | 524 | | 42.4% |
| 1960 | 409 | | −21.9% |
| 1970 | 426 | | 4.2% |
| 1980 | 482 | | 13.1% |
| 1990 | 493 | | 2.3% |
| 2000 | 488 | | −1.0% |
| 2010 | 540 | | 10.7% |
| 2020 | 454 | | −15.9% |
U.S. Decennial Census

As of the census of 2000, there were 488 people, 198 households, and 131 families residing in the town. The population density was 651.3 inhabitants per square mile (251.5/km^{2}). There were 221 housing units at an average density of 295.0 per square mile (113.9/km^{2}). The racial makeup of the town was 92.62% White, 3.28% African American, 0.61% Native American, 0.82% from other races, and 2.66% from two or more races. Hispanic or Latino of any race were 0.61% of the population.

There were 198 households, out of which 28.3% had children under the age of 18 living with them, 55.1% were married couples living together, 7.1% had a female householder with no husband present, and 33.8% were non-families. 28.8% of all households were made up of individuals, and 12.6% had someone living alone who was 65 years of age or older. The average household size was 2.46 and the average family size was 3.08.

In the town, the population was spread out, with 24.2% under the age of 18, 7.8% from 18 to 24, 31.4% from 25 to 44, 25.8% from 45 to 64, and 10.9% who were 65 years of age or older. The median age was 37 years. For every 100 females, there were 99.2 males. For every 100 females age 18 and over, there were 93.7 males.

The median income for a household in the town was $32,632, and the median income for a family was $34,904. Males had a median income of $24,167 versus $20,179 for females. The per capita income for the town was $13,958. About 8.6% of families and 11.4% of the population were below the poverty line, including 15.3% of those under age 18 and 7.8% of those age 65 or over.
