= Six Mile, Georgia =

Unincorporated community in Georgia, U.S.

Coordinates: 34°10′38″N 85°12′23″W

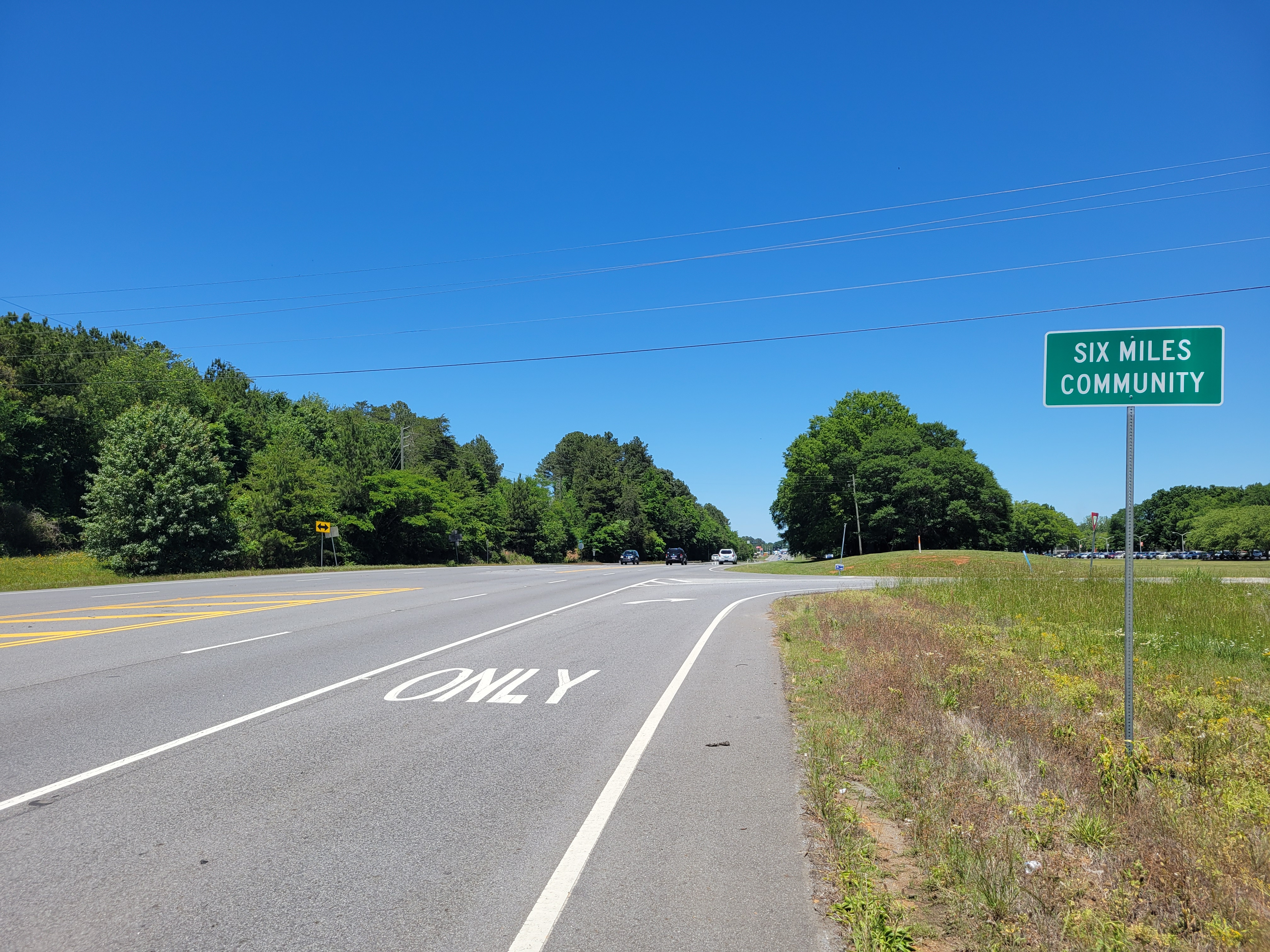
Six Miles Community sign

Six Mile is an unincorporated community in Floyd County, in the U.S. state of Georgia.

== History ==
An early variant name was "Courtesy". The community owes its present name to the fact it lies six miles (9.7 km) from Rome.
