= Waco, Georgia =

- City
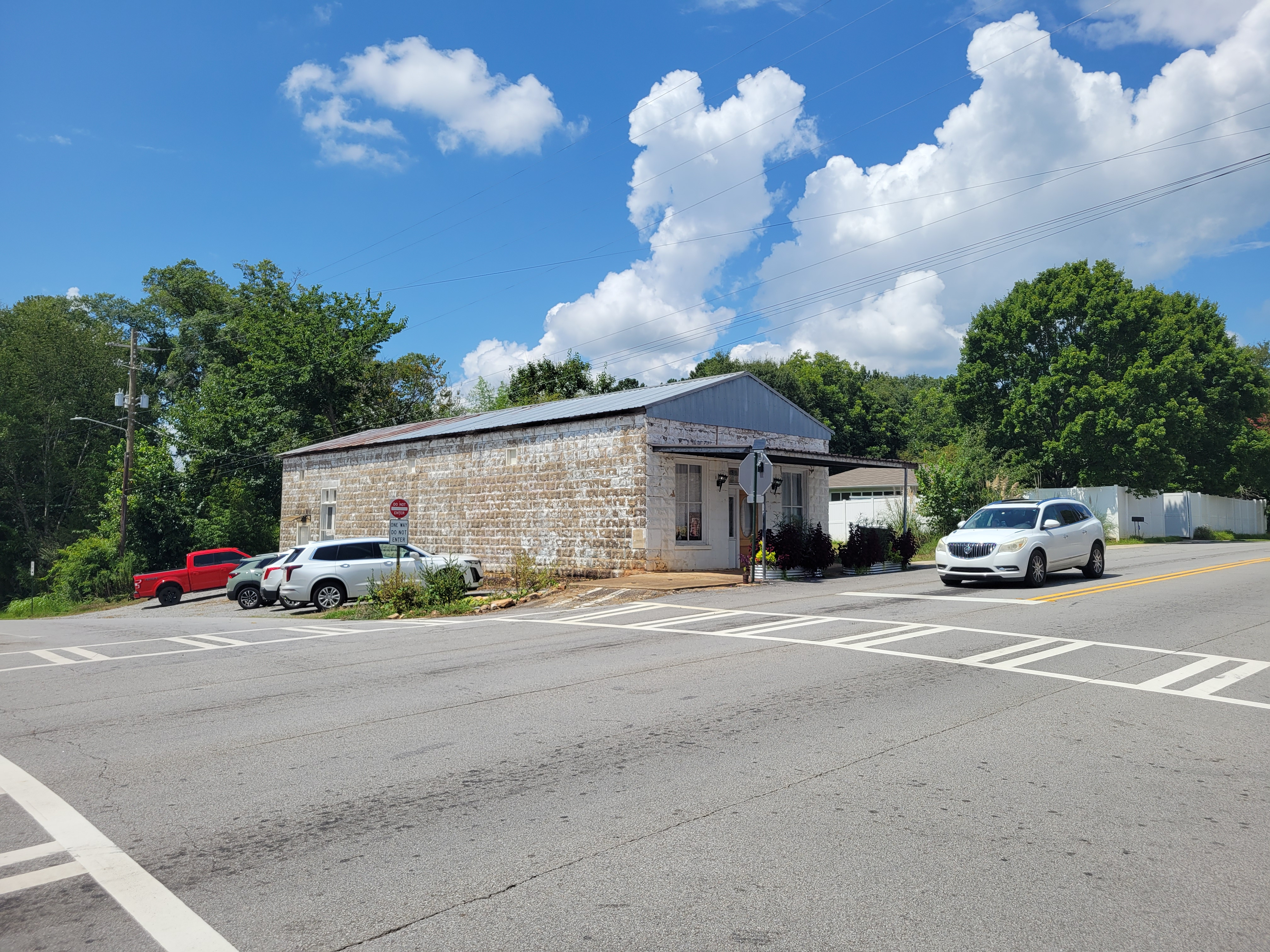
- Waco Lodge No 149
- Motto: "Small town, big horizons"
- Location in Haralson County and the state of Georgia
- Coordinates: 33°42′10″N 85°11′00″W
- Country: United States
- State: Georgia
- County: Haralson

Area
  - Total: 1.83 sq mi (4.75 km^{2})
  - Land: 1.83 sq mi (4.75 km^{2})
  - Water: 0 sq mi (0.00 km^{2})
- Elevation: 1,389 ft (423 m)

Population (2020)
  - Total: 536
  - Density: 292.0/sq mi (112.76/km^{2})
- Time zone: UTC-5 (Eastern (EST))
  - Summer (DST): UTC-4 (EDT)
- ZIP code: 30182
- Area code: 770
- FIPS code: 13-79808
- GNIS feature ID: 0333338
- Website: www.wacoga.net

Waco is a city in Haralson County, Georgia, United States, located near the Alabama state line. As of the 2020 census, Waco had a population of 536.

== History ==
The Georgia General Assembly incorporated Waco in 1885. Waco is a name derived from the Muskogean language meaning "heron".

== Geography ==
Waco is bordered to the south and east by the city of Bremen. U.S. Route 78 passes through the center of town, leading east 2.5 miles (4.0 km) to the center of Bremen and northwest 7 miles (11 km) to Tallapoosa. Interstate 20 forms the southern border of Waco and provides access from Exit 9 (Atlantic Avenue). I-20 leads east 48 miles (77 km) to Atlanta and west 98 miles (158 km) to Birmingham, Alabama.

According to the United States Census Bureau, Waco has a total area of 1.9 square miles (4.8 km^{2}), all land.

== Demographics ==
Historical population
Census	Pop.	Note	%±
1890	357		—
1900	345		−3.4%
1910	326		−5.5%
1920	333		2.1%
1930	208		−37.5%
1940	304		46.2%
1950	328		7.9%
1960	381		16.2%
1970	431		13.1%
1980	471		9.3%
1990	461		−2.1%
2000	469		1.7%
2010	516		10.0%
2020	536		3.9%
U.S. Decennial Census

=== 2020 census ===
Waco racial composition
Race	Num.	Perc.
White (non-Hispanic)	490	91.42%
Black or African American (non-Hispanic)	17	3.17%
Native American	2	0.37%
Asian	3	0.56%
Other/mixed	18	3.36%
Hispanic or Latino	6	1.12%

As of the 2020 United States census, there were 536 people, 200 households, and 151 families residing in the city.

=== 2000 census ===
As of the census of 2000, there were 469 people, 189 households, and 130 families residing in the city. The population density was 291.4 inhabitants per square mile (112.5/km^{2}). There were 203 housing units at an average density of 126.1 per square mile (48.7/km^{2}). The racial makeup of the city was 97.01% White, 1.49% African American, 0.43% Native American, 0.85% from other races, and 0.21% from two or more races.

There were 189 households, out of which 28.6% had children under the age of 18 living with them, 56.1% were married couples living together, 8.5% had a female householder with no husband present, and 30.7% were non-families. 24.9% of all households were made up of individuals, and 9.0% had someone living alone who was 65 years of age or older. The average household size was 2.48 and the average family size was 2.99.

In the city, the population was spread out, with 24.3% under the age of 18, 7.7% from 18 to 24, 28.1% from 25 to 44, 28.8% from 45 to 64, and 11.1% who were 65 years of age or older. The median age was 35 years. For every 100 females, there were 115.1 males. For every 100 females age 18 and over, there were 101.7 males.

The median income for a household in the city was $31,667, and the median income for a family was $40,417. Males had a median income of $29,000 versus $21,094 for females. The per capita income for the city was $16,076. About 9.5% of families and 13.5% of the population were below the poverty line, including 22.0% of those under age 18 and 10.8% of those age 65 or over.
