= Bremen, Georgia =

- City
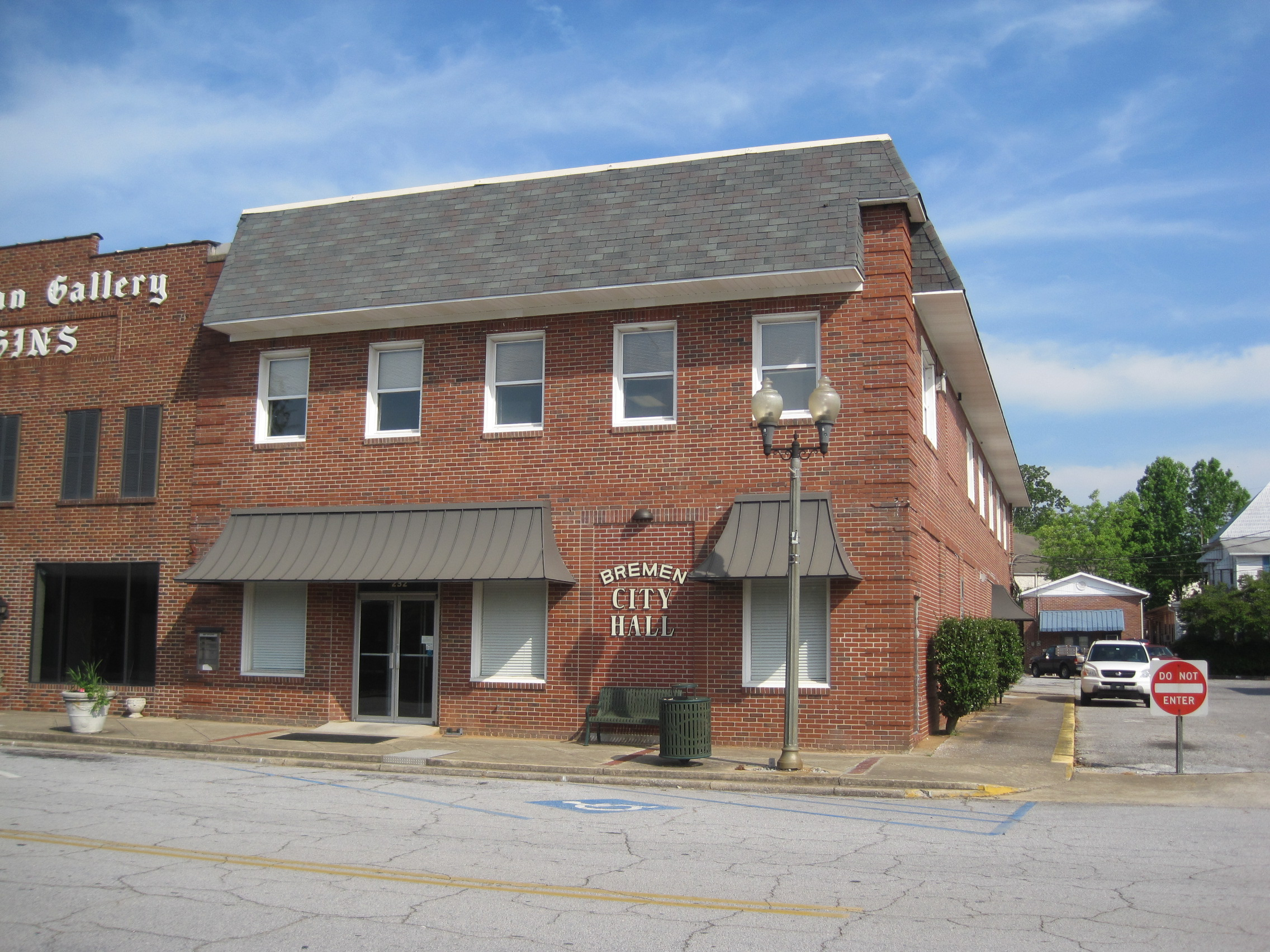
- Bremen City Hall

- Location in Haralson County and the state of Georgia
- Coordinates: 33°42′57″N 85°8′50″W
- Country: United States
- State: Georgia
- Counties: Haralson, Carroll
- Named after: Bremen, Germany

Government
  - Mayor: Sharon Sewell

Area
  - Total: 10.64 sq mi (27.56 km^{2})
  - Land: 10.61 sq mi (27.48 km^{2})
  - Water: 0.027 sq mi (0.07 km^{2})
- Elevation: 1,394 ft (425 m)

Population (2020)
  - Total: 7,185
  - Density: 677.1/sq mi (261.43/km^{2})
- Time zone: UTC-5 (Eastern (EST))
  - Summer (DST): UTC-4 (EDT)
- ZIP Codes: 30110, 30182
- Area code: 770
- FIPS code: 13-10132
- GNIS feature ID: 0354845
- Website: www.bremenga.gov

Bremen (/ˈbriːmən/ BREE-mən) is a city in Haralson and Carroll counties, Georgia, United States. As of the 2020 census, the city had a population of 7,185 up from 6,227 in the 2010 census. Most of the city is in Haralson County, with a small portion in Carroll County.

== Geography ==
Bremen is located in southern Haralson County and northern Carroll County at 33°42′57″N 85°8′50″W (33.715933, -85.147213). U.S. Route 78 passes through the center of the city, leading east 6 miles (10 km) to Temple and west 9 miles (14 km) to Tallapoosa. U.S. Route 27 passes through the western part of the city, leading north 45 miles (72 km) to Rome and south 53 miles (85 km) to LaGrange. Interstate 20 passes through the southern part of the city, leading east 46 miles (74 km) to Atlanta and west 100 miles (160 km) to Birmingham, Alabama.

According to the United States Census Bureau, Bremen has a total area of 10.5 square miles (27.3 km^{2}), of which 0.027 square miles (0.07 km^{2}), or 0.27%, is water.

== Climate ==
This region experiences hot and wet summers with rainy days. According to the Köppen Climate Classification system, Bremen has a humid subtropical climate (Köppen Cfa).

There are cool winters during which intense rainfall occurs.

Snow in Bremen is possible in winter months due to the higher latitude.

Climate data for Bremen, Georgia
Month	Jan	Feb	Mar	Apr	May	Jun	Jul	Aug	Sep	Oct	Nov	Dec	Year
Mean daily maximum °F (°C)	52.0 (11.1)	56.0 (13.3)	65.0 (18.3)	73.0 (22.8)	80.0 (26.7)	86.0 (30.0)	88.0 (31.1)	87.0 (30.6)	81.0 (27.2)	72.0 (22.2)	63.0 (17.2)	55.0 (12.8)	71.5 (21.9)
Mean daily minimum °F (°C)	30.0 (−1.1)	33.0 (0.6)	39.0 (3.9)	46.0 (7.8)	54.0 (12.2)	62.0 (16.7)	66.0 (18.9)	66.0 (18.9)	60.0 (15.6)	47.0 (8.3)	38.0 (3.3)	33.0 (0.6)	47.8 (8.8)
Average precipitation inches (mm)	5.1 (130)	5.0 (130)	5.7 (140)	4.5 (110)	4.1 (100)	4.0 (100)	4.8 (120)	3.7 (94)	3.6 (91)	3.4 (86)	4.3 (110)	4.9 (120)	53.1 (1,331)
Average snowfall inches (cm)	0.2 (0.51)	0 (0)	0 (0)	0 (0)	0 (0)	0 (0)	0 (0)	0 (0)	0 (0)	0 (0)	0 (0)	0.2 (0.51)	0.4 (1.02)
Average snowy days	0	0	0	0	0	0	0	0	0	0	0	0	0
Source: NOAA

== Demographics ==
Historical population
Census	Pop.	Note	%±
1890	312		—
1900	291		−6.7%
1910	890		205.8%
1920	917		3.0%
1930	1,030		12.3%
1940	1,708		65.8%
1950	2,299		34.6%
1960	3,132		36.2%
1970	3,484		11.2%
1980	3,966		13.8%
1990	4,356		9.8%
2000	4,579		5.1%
2010	6,227		36.0%
2020	7,185		15.4%
U.S. Decennial Census

=== 2020 census ===
As of the 2020 census, Bremen had a population of 7,185. The median age was 35.8 years. 28.8% of residents were under the age of 18 and 13.8% of residents were 65 years of age or older. For every 100 females there were 89.2 males, and for every 100 females age 18 and over there were 86.8 males age 18 and over.

93.8% of residents lived in urban areas, while 6.2% lived in rural areas.

There were 2,590 households and 1,605 families in Bremen. Of those households, 43.7% had children under the age of 18 living in them. Of all households, 52.9% were married-couple households, 14.9% were households with a male householder and no spouse or partner present, and 26.9% were households with a female householder and no spouse or partner present. About 23.6% of all households were made up of individuals and 10.5% had someone living alone who was 65 years of age or older.

There were 2,806 housing units, of which 7.7% were vacant. The homeowner vacancy rate was 1.8% and the rental vacancy rate was 7.2%.

Bremen racial composition
Race	Num.	Perc.
White (non-Hispanic)	6,162	85.76%
Black or African American (non-Hispanic)	470	6.54%
Native American	8	0.11%
Asian	95	1.32%
Pacific Islander	8	0.11%
Other/mixed	291	4.05%
Hispanic or Latino	151	2.1%

As of 2020 6,182 of Bremen residents lived in Haralson County, while 45 Bremen residents lived in Carroll County.

=== 2000 census ===
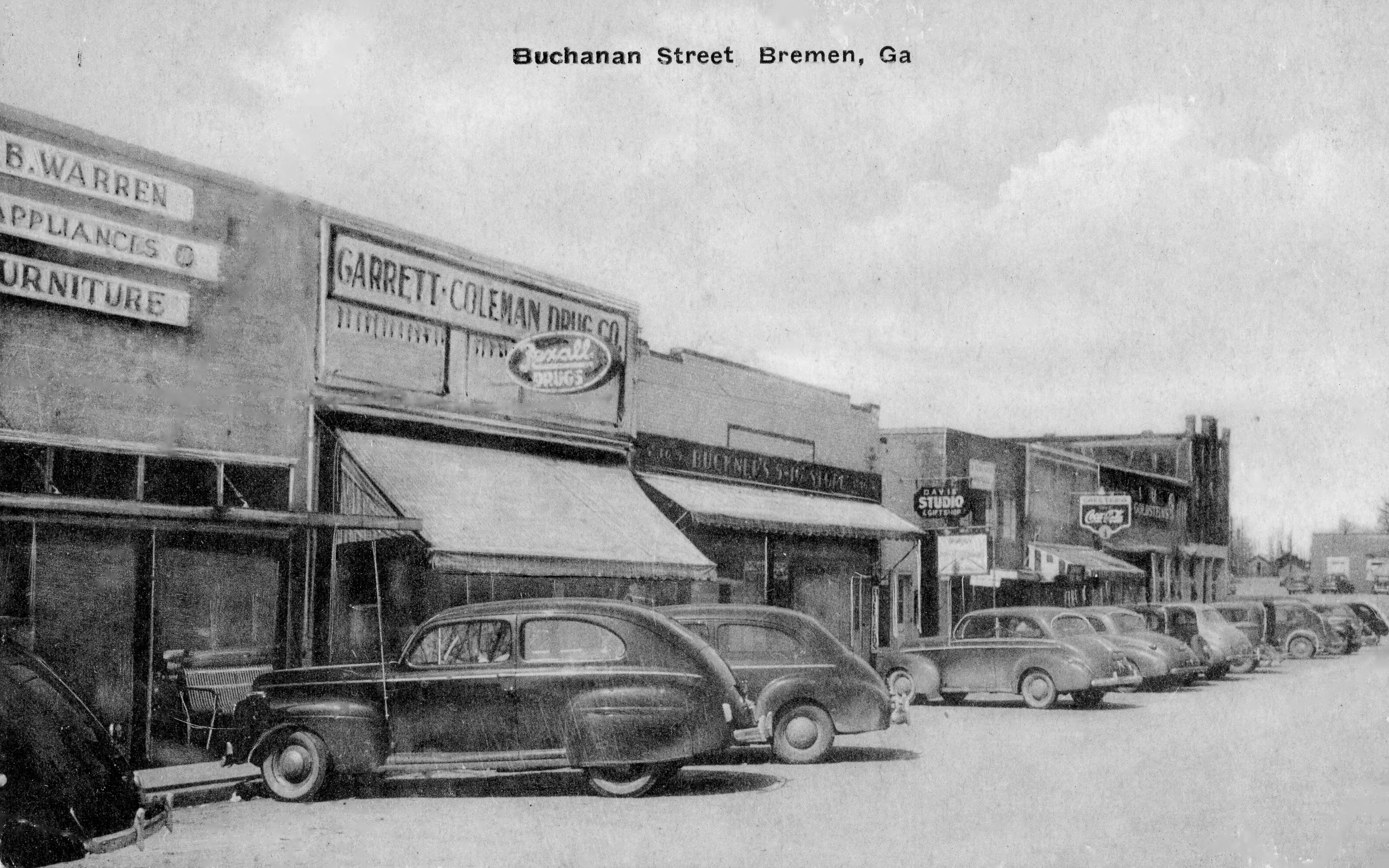
Buchanan Street circa 1940s

At the 2000 census, there were 4,579 people, 1,824 households and 1,245 families residing in the city. The population density was 515.7 inhabitants per square mile (199.1/km^{2}). There were 1,978 housing units at an average density of 222.8 units per square mile (86.0 units/km^{2}). The racial makeup of the city was 88.53% White, 9.54% African American, 0.22% Native American, 0.74% Asian, 0.24% from other races, and 0.72% from two or more races. Hispanic or Latino people of any race were 0.87% of the population.

There were 1,824 households, of which 32.6% had children under the age of 18 living with them, 51.0% were married couples living together, 13.7% had a female householder with no husband present, and 31.7% were non-families. 28.6% of all households were made up of individuals, and 13.8% had someone living alone who was 65 years of age or older. The average household size was 2.43 and the average family size was 2.98.

Age distribution was 25.5% under the age of 18, 8.0% from 18 to 24, 28.5% from 25 to 44, 20.0% from 45 to 64, and 18.1% who were 65 years of age or older. The median age was 37 years. For every 100 females, there were 85.5 males. For every 100 females age 18 and over, there were 81.4 males.

The median household income $29,354, and the median family income was $39,674. Males had a median income of $32,500 versus $20,823 for females. The per capita income for the city was $16,833. About 6.2% of families and 10.3% of the population were below the poverty line, including 7.8% of those under age 18 and 12.8% of those age 65 or over.

== Culture ==
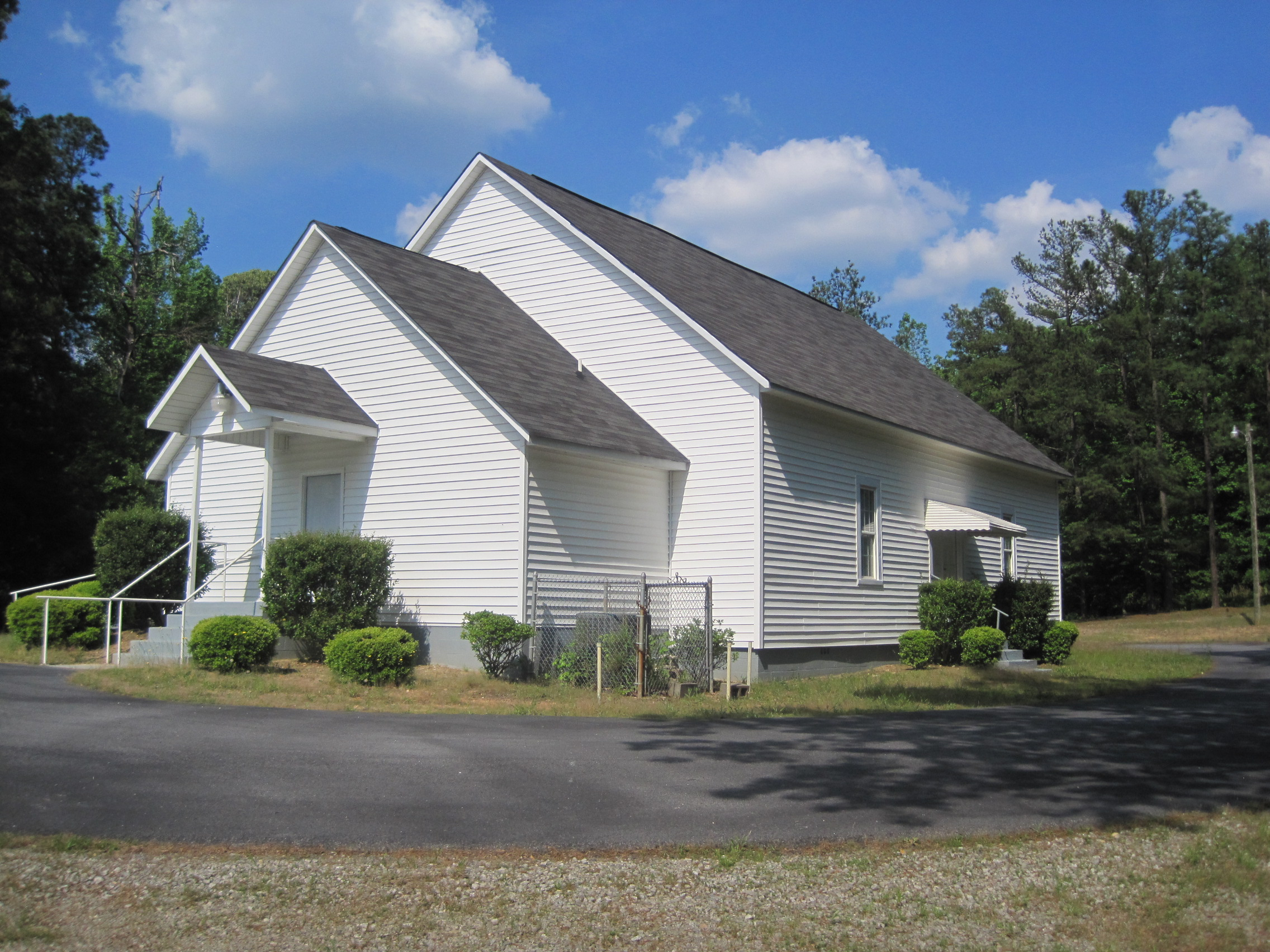
Holly Springs Primitive Baptist church is known for biannual all-day Sacred Harp singings.

Bremen is the home of Hugh McGraw, a noted scholar of American hymnody and the foremost expert in and promoter of the Sacred Harp tradition of shape note singing. The Sacred Harp Publishing Company, which McGraw led from 1958 to 2002, is located in nearby Carrollton.

Holly Springs Primitive Baptist Church, which holds an annual two-day Sacred Harp singing convention in June and an-all day singing in November, is located in Bremen. The Church at Chapelhill meets at Mill Town Music Hall on Sunday at 11am.

== Early inhabitants ==
Prior to the early 18th century, Bremen and most of Georgia were home to American Indians belonging to a southeastern alliance known as the Creek Confederacy. The present day Creek Nation, also known as the Muskogee, were the major tribe in that alliance. According to Creek traditions, the Creek Confederacy migrated to the southeastern United States from the Southwest. The confederacy was probably formed as a defense against other large groups to the north. The name "Creek" came from the shortening of "Ocheese Creek" Indians, a name given by the English to the native people living along the Ocheese Creek (or Ocmulgee River). In time, the name was applied to all groups of the Creek Confederacy.

== History ==
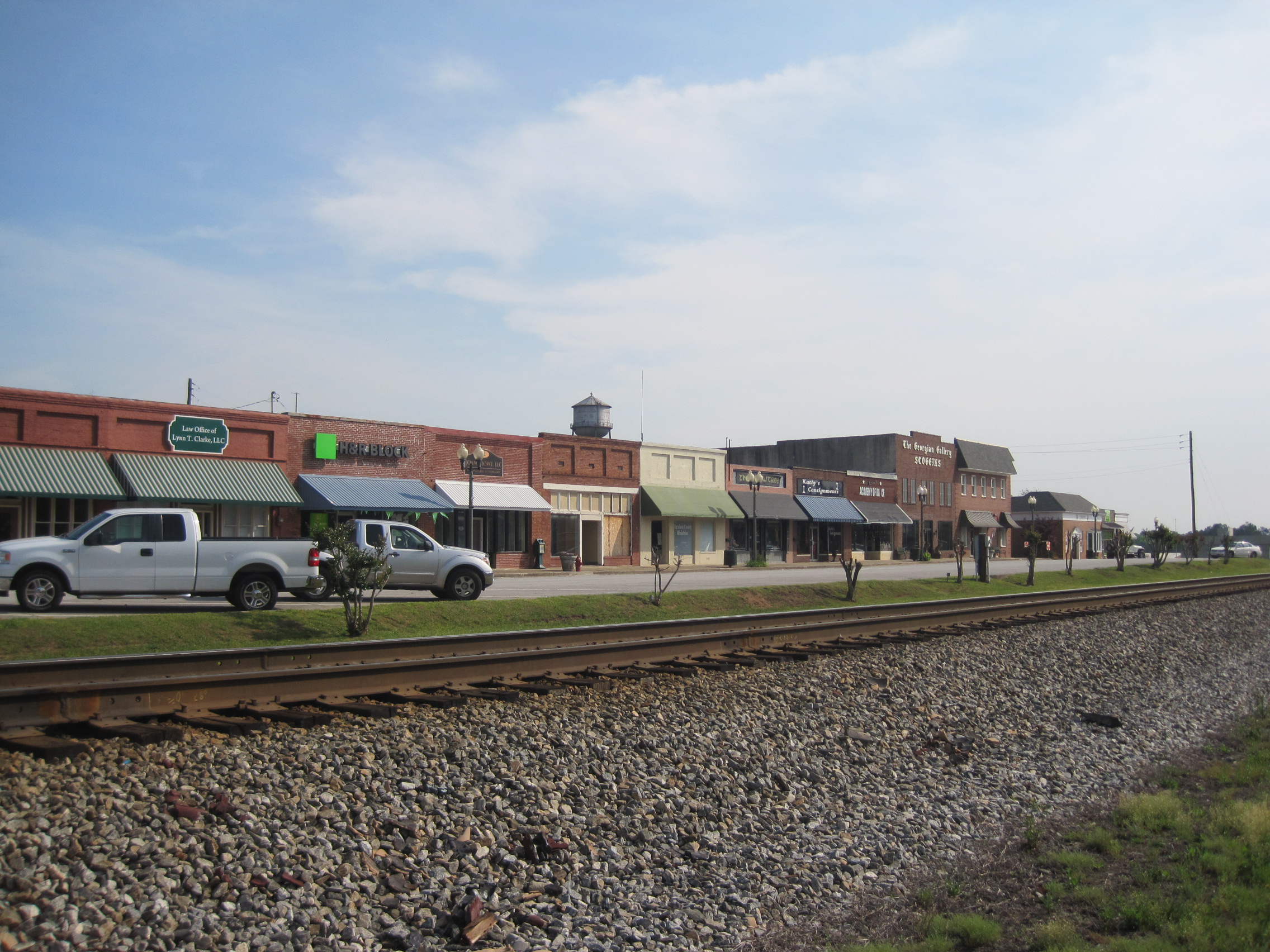
Railroad tracks along Tallapoosa Street in downtown Bremen

The town of Kramer was incorporated on September 5, 1883, and given the name Bremen. It was originally named for a German immigrant who owned a local vineyard, but the name was changed at Kramer's request to honor the city of Bremen, Germany.

Bremen's economy was given a significant boost when the Chattanooga, Rome and Columbus Railroad was built, intersecting the Georgia Pacific at Bremen. This and other circumstances have helped Bremen to grow from a simple railroad junction settled by German immigrants to the largest town in Haralson County.

== Education ==
=== Bremen City School District ===
The Bremen City School District provides education for pre-school to grade twelve, consisting of three elementary schools, a middle school and a high school. The district has 96 full-time teachers and over 1,575 students.

- Bremen 4th/5th Academy
- Crossroad Academy
- Jones Elementary
- Bremen Middle School
- Bremen High School

== Higgins General Hospital ==
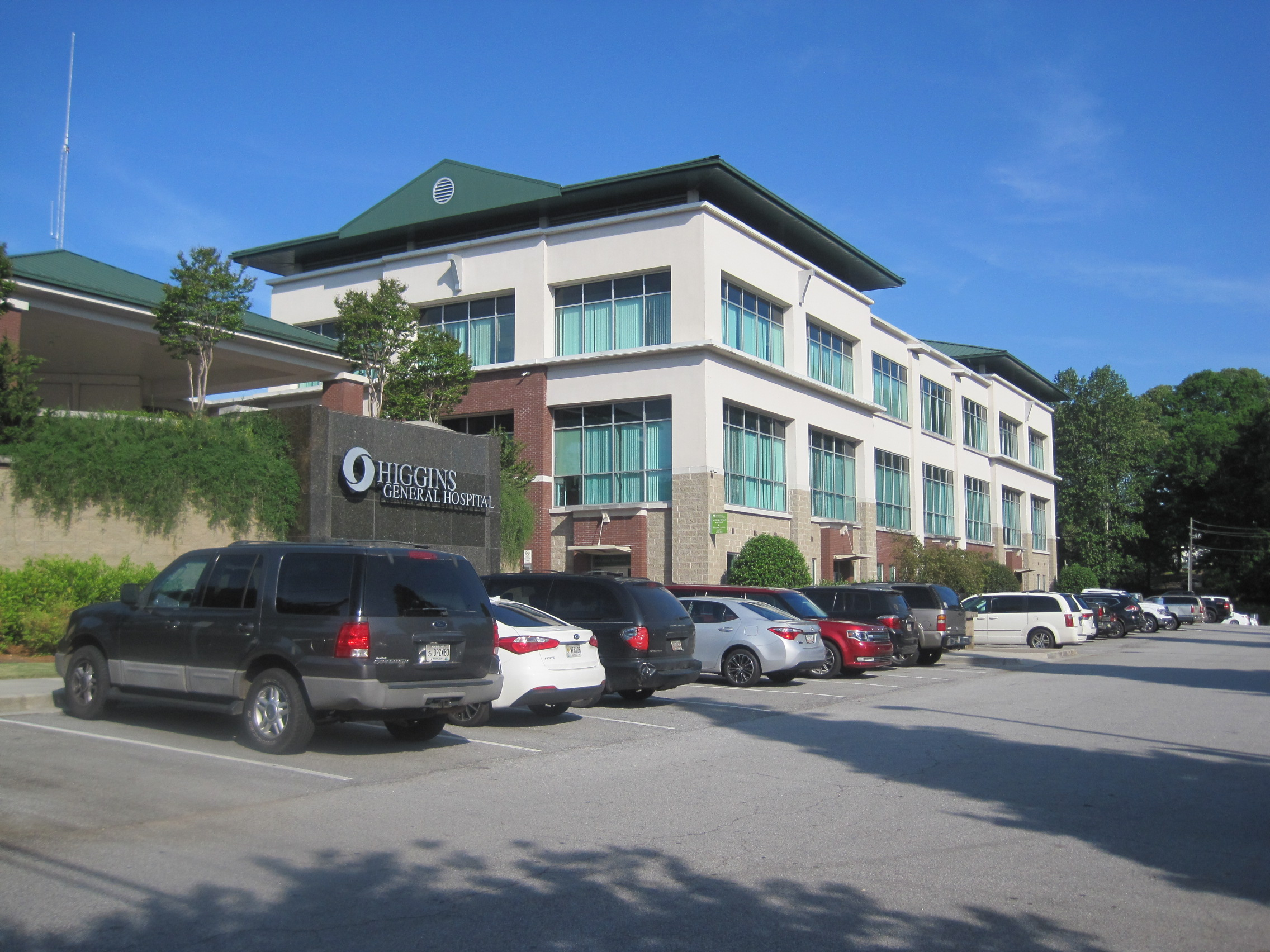
Higgins General Hospital

Higgins General Hospital became affiliated with Tanner Health System in 1998. The 25-bed critical access hospital underwent an extensive $7.5 million renovation and expansion. It offers inpatient as well as outpatient medical services, including a 24-hour emergency department, same-day surgery, lithotripsy, and a wide range of outpatient services.

It was originally named Bremen General Hospital when it opened on January 3, 1955. The name was changed to Higgins General Hospital on May 1, 1973, in recognition of the work and dedication of its chairman, S.O. (Samuel) Higgins Sr.

== Cost of living index ==
The December 2009 cost of living index in Bremen was 81.9 (low, compared with the U.S. average of 100).

== Transportation ==
U.S. 78 runs east-west through Bremen. U.S. 27 runs north–south to the west of the city. Business route 27 runs through the center of Bremen. Interstate 20 runs to the south of Bremen.

West Georgia Regional Airport is seven miles south of Bremen.

Historically, the Southern Railway ran several daily passenger trains, including the Kansas City-Florida Special, the Sunnyland and an Atlanta-Birmingham section of the Piedmont Limited, making stops in Bremen. The last trains made stops in 1967. The former the Southern Railway train (now Amtrak) Crescent, which operates from New York City to New Orleans passes through Bremen twice a day on the Norfolk Southern, but makes no stops.

== Notable people ==
- Sammy Byrd (1906–1981), major league baseball player and professional golfer
- Neal Horsley (1944–2015), anti-abortion activist
- Hugh McGraw (1931–2017), Sacred Harp singing master and composer
- Thomas Bailey Murphy (1924–2007), speaker of the Georgia House of Representatives
- Harold Shedd (born 1931), country music industry executive and producer
- Jake Verity, placekicker for the Indianapolis Colts
