= Tallapoosa, Georgia =

City in Georgia, United States

Tallapoosa, Georgia Talwa Posa
- City
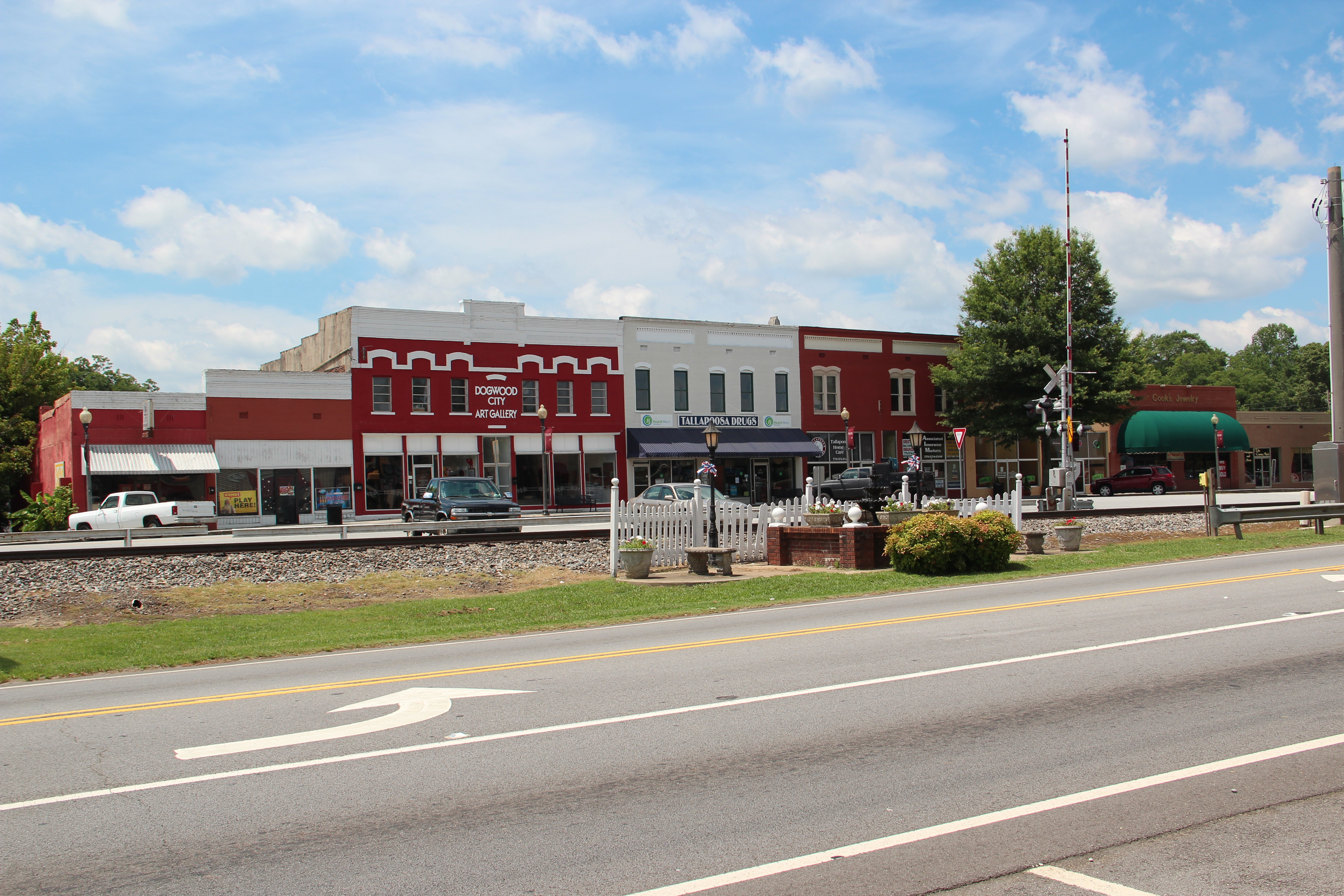
- Downtown Tallapoosa

- Flag Seal
- Nickname: The Dogwood City
- Location in Haralson County and the state of Georgia
- Coordinates: 33°45′N 85°17′W
- Country: United States
- State: Georgia
- County: Haralson

Government
  - Mayor: Brett Jones
  - City Manager: Philip Eidson

Area
  - Total: 10.05 sq mi (26.04 km^{2})
  - Land: 10.03 sq mi (25.97 km^{2})
  - Water: 0.027 sq mi (0.07 km^{2})
- Elevation: 1,138 ft (347 m)

Population (2020)
  - Total: 3,227
  - Density: 321.8/sq mi (124.25/km^{2})
- Time zone: UTC-5 (Eastern (EST))
  - Summer (DST): UTC-4 (EDT)
- ZIP code: 30176
- Area code: 770
- FIPS code: 13-75300
- GNIS feature ID: 0323891
- Website: tallapoosaga.gov

Tallapoosa /tæləˈpuːsə/ is a city in Haralson County, Georgia. As of the 2020 census, Tallapoosa had a population of 3,227.

== History ==
The Georgia General Assembly incorporated Tallapoosa as a town in 1860. The community lends its name to the Tallapoosa River.

The name "Tallapoosa" is derived from the Creek words "Talwa" (town) and "Puse" (grandmother).

The name first appeared on Georgia maps in the 19th century, notably around the 1820s. The name "Tallapoosee" was used to refer to the Tallapoosa River and surrounding regions. The spelling reflects documentation and naming conventions of the time, prior to the more standardized spelling "Tallapoosa" that became common later.

The name shows respect, reverence and origin of the grandmother as the native Creek and nearby Cherokee practiced a matrilineal system of descent. Clan membership, inheritance, social structure and descent were traced through the mothers line and passed down through the maternal side. The grandmother was seen as a central figure in community life. They held a significant role in council meetings and were regarded as the bearers of wisdom, tradition and cultural knowledge, having a key role in mediating disputes and conflicts preserving traditions and guiding future generations. They often led social and ceremonial events.

The Tallapoosa branch of the Muskogee (Creek) tribe is one of the oldest groups in the Southeast.

Tallapoosa was a location of tribal meetings held by the Creek Indians, its location being a central point of trade between the Creek territory located in the lower flatlands to the south and the northern Cherokee territory located in the upper Appalachian mountains.

A historic marker marks this meeting location in Tallapoosa titled "Seven Chestnuts" where Creek Indians held their council meetings under seven chestnut trees. Another nearby historical marker titled "Sandtown Trail" marks the location of the Sandtown Trail, a route taken by Creek Indians which later became a stagecoach route traveled by white settlers.

Tallapoosa was once referred to as "Opossum Snout" (circa 1891) in a painting by artist Lyell E. Carr depicting the area.

Today the town hosts an annual New Year's Eve Possum Drop, one of the largest New Year's Eve celebrations in Georgia.

== Geography ==
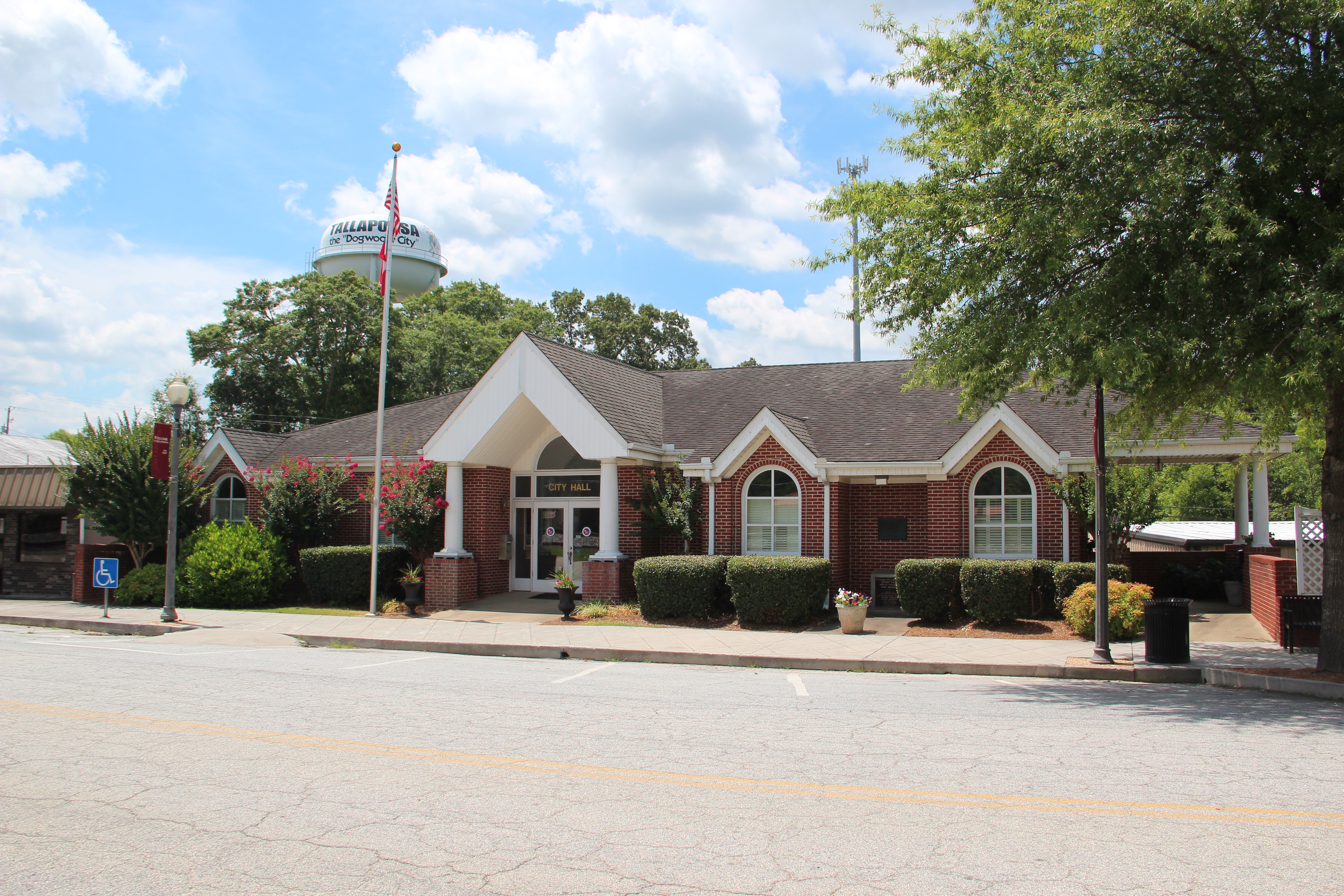
City Hall

Tallapoosa is located in the western part of Haralson County in northwest Georgia. Its geographic coordinates are 33°45′N 85°17′W (33.7437, -85.2879).

U.S. Route 78 and Georgia State Route 100 are the main highways through the city. U.S. 78 runs through the city from east to west as Atlanta Street, leading southeast 7 mi (11 km) to Waco and west 9 mi (14 km) to Fruithurst, Alabama. GA-100 runs north–south through the city concurrent with U.S. 78, leading north 21 mi (34 km) to Cedartown and south 16 mi (26 km) to Bowdon. Interstate 20 passes about 5 mi (8.0 km) south of the city center, with access from exit 5 (GA-100). I-20 leads east 58 mi (93 km) to Atlanta and west 99 mi (159 km) to Birmingham, Alabama.

According to the U.S. Census Bureau, the city has a total area of 10.0 square miles (26.0 km^{2}), of which 0.03 square miles (0.07 km^{2}), or 0.27%, are water.

== Demographics ==
Historical population
Census	Pop.	Note	%±
1880	52		—
1890	1,699		3,167.3%
1900	2,128		25.3%
1910	2,117		−0.5%
1920	2,719		28.4%
1930	2,417		−11.1%
1940	2,338		−3.3%
1950	2,826		20.9%
1960	2,744		−2.9%
1970	2,896		5.5%
1980	2,647		−8.6%
1990	2,805		6.0%
2000	2,789		−0.6%
2010	3,170		13.7%
2020	3,227		1.8%
U.S. Decennial Census

=== 2020 census ===
As of the 2020 census, Tallapoosa had a population of 3,227. There were 789 families residing in the city.

The median age was 40.6 years. 23.5% of residents were under the age of 18 and 17.3% of residents were 65 years of age or older. For every 100 females there were 90.0 males, and for every 100 females age 18 and over there were 87.1 males age 18 and over.

0.0% of residents lived in urban areas, while 100.0% lived in rural areas.

There were 1,283 households in Tallapoosa, of which 33.4% had children under the age of 18 living in them. Of all households, 42.2% were married-couple households, 17.9% were households with a male householder and no spouse or partner present, and 32.9% were households with a female householder and no spouse or partner present. About 29.9% of all households were made up of individuals and 15.6% had someone living alone who was 65 years of age or older.

There were 1,441 housing units, of which 11.0% were vacant. The homeowner vacancy rate was 2.3% and the rental vacancy rate was 11.0%.

Tallapoosa racial composition
Race	Num.	Perc.
White (non-Hispanic)	2,895	89.71%
Black or African American (non-Hispanic)	159	4.93%
Native American	7	0.22%
Asian	18	0.56%
Other/Mixed	112	3.47%
Hispanic or Latino	36	1.12%

=== 2000 census ===
As of the 2000 census, there were 2,789 people, 1,187 households, and 764 families residing in the city. The population density was 375.6 inhabitants per square mile (145.0/km^{2}). There were 1,334 housing units at an average density of 179.7 units per square mile (69.4 units/km^{2}). The racial makeup of the city was 91.18% White, 6.63% African American, 0.22% Native American, 0.90% Asian, 0.07% from other races, and 1.00% from two or more races. Hispanic or Latino people of any race were 0.32% of the population.

There were 1,187 households, out of which 28.3% had children under the age of 18 living with them, 46.3% were married couples living together, 14.9% had a female householder with no husband present, and 35.6% were non-families. 32.3% of all households were made up of individuals, and 16.4% had someone living alone who was 65 years of age or older. The average household size was 2.34 and the average family size was 2.95.

In the city, the population was spread out, with 24.7% under the age of 18, 7.5% from 18 to 24, 26.2% from 25 to 44, 23.8% from 45 to 64, and 17.7% who were 65 years of age or older. The median age was 38 years. For every 100 females, there were 81.3 males. For every 100 females age 18 and over, there were 79.6 males.

The median income for a household in the city was $29,938, and the median income for a family was $37,401. Males had a median income of $34,102 versus $21,130 for females. The per capita income for the city was $15,302. About 12.8% of families and 19.4% of the population were below the poverty line, including 25.0% of those under age 18 and 26.9% of those age 65 or over.

== Popular culture ==
Tallapoosa is mentioned in these works:

- The 1933 pre-code movie Baby Face, starring Barbara Stanwyck

* The song "I've Been Everywhere", a performance of which was recorded by Johnny Cash in 1996.[15]

- The poem "Stars at Tallapoosa" by Wallace Stevens, published in his collection Harmonium (1923)
- TLC filmed the New Year's special of their show Here Comes Honey Boo Boo at The Possum Drop in Tallapoosa.

== Notable people ==
- Leroy Almon, woodcarver
- Rhubarb Jones, radio personality
