= George Washington Carver High School (Carrollton, Georgia) =

Location
- 423 Alabama Street; 101 Pearl Street; Carrollton, Georgia 30117; United States; 33.582938°N 85.081437°W

Information
- Former name: Carroll County Training School
- School type: Public black school
- Established: 1913 (Unknown name); 1932 (CCTS); 1954 (Carver High)
- Closed: 1969
- School district: Carrollton City Schools
- Principal: M. S. Molette (1943-1967); C. E. Charles Wilson (1967-1969)
- Grades: 8-12
- Colors: Royal blue and gold
- Nickname: Mighty Yellow Jackets
- Yearbook: The Carrolltonian; The Carverite; The Jacket

George Washington Carver High School was a public secondary school in Carrollton, Georgia, United States. It served as the only high school for African American students in Carroll County during segregation. The school closed in 1969 with the completion of the county's integration process.

== History ==
The Carrollton City School District was established in 1886 and opened the Carrollton Public School a year later. This school served children in the local Carrollton area and expanded to include a school on Maple Street in 1913 and a separate Carrollton High School building on South White Street in 1921. However, the only children allowed to attend these schools were white. School racial segregation was still in existence and African American students were denied admittance into these schools.

The first black school in Carrollton opened on Pearl Street in 1913. However, the original name of this school is unknown. (Retroactively referred to as Pearl Street School) In 1932, using funds raised from a bond issue by the city of Carrollton, along with matching funds from the Rosenwald Fund, the first school for black children that reached past the elementary level (serving grades 1-11) opened under the name Carroll County Training School on the corner of Alabama and King Streets. In 1954, a new building was built for grades 8-12 and was named George Washington Carver High School while the adjacent Carroll County Training School, becoming a feeder elementary school, was renamed "Alabama Street Elementary". Carver had an initial enrollment of around 600, which remained fairly constant until the school closed. In 1963, the school district opened "West Side Elementary" nearby to serve as a feeder school. In 1965, the beginning of integration of Carroll County commenced and a "school choice" plan was implemented, which allowed students to choose which high school to attend regardless of race. Eleven Carver High students, the first in the county's integration history, chose to attend the previously all white Temple High School, but they recall being met with racial harassment and intimidation upon first enrolling. In 1969, Carroll County completed its local integration process; Carver was closed and all students were reassigned to previously all-white high schools. The school reopened as an integrated Alabama Street Elementary with its absorption into the single cluster school system until 1992.

=== Legacy ===
In 2005, Carver High alums Carolyn Gray and James Ira Wyatt founded the Carver High Museum and Archives to collect and preserve the history of the school and the African American community of Carrollton. Carrollton Board of Education member and Carver High graduate Joshua Mabry proposed turning the site of the school into a museum with collaboration from the non-profit organization. Mabry died however in 2008 and the remaining board members decided to sell the site of the former school. In 2020, the owner of the site, Dr. Brent Harris, a physician and owner of US MedClinic, a local business, planned to turn the facility into a molecular lab. This announcement was met with mixed reactions from the community. Nearby residents scrutinized the plan citing concerns about the safety of such a facility in a suburban setting while others encouraged the idea of utilizing the abandoned site. Many also questioned Harris's original purchase of the site with disappointment that the former school was now owned by a private businessman. Harris decided against his plans after pushback from various community voices, and later considered the idea of converting the facility into lofts. However, this idea was never realized, and Harris was arrested in late July 2021 for crimes related to his medical work. The site currently remains unused.

== Athletics ==
Carroll County Training School was the first school in the county to win state championships. With the conversion to Carver High, the Yellow Jackets were the first local school team to win a state title with two state championships and three district titles in the 1950s. The school is also the alma mater to Olympic gold medalist Catherine Hardy Lavender whose team placed first in the 4x4 Women's Relay at the 1952 Summer Olympics in Helsinki.

== Entrance to West Georgia College denied ==
In the 1955 and 1956 school years, every black senior at Carver applied for admission to West Georgia College (now the University of West Georgia), and all were denied admission because of their skin color. In 2002, the college apologized, and an anonymous donor created a scholarship fund for the descendants of the students who had been denied admission.

== Notable alumni ==
=== Carroll County Training School ===
- Catherine Hardy Lavender - Olympic athlete and gold medalist

=== Carver High School ===
- Margie Alexander - American gospel and soul singer
