= Grisham Stadium =

Multi-purpose stadium in Carrollton, Georgia

Coordinates: 33.564262°N 85.081723°W

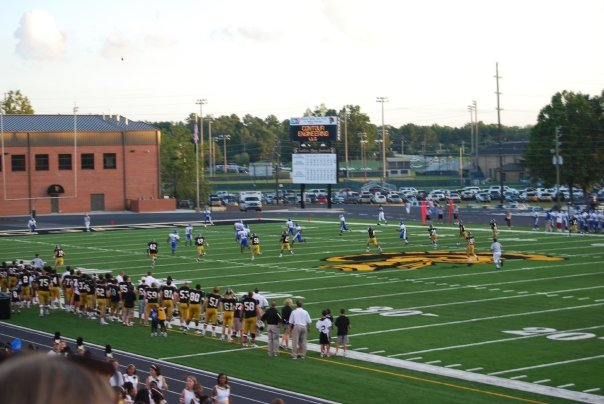
- Interactive map of Grisham Stadium
- Full name: Grisham Stadium, Maddox - Musselwhite Track at Historic Trojan Field
- Former names: Trojan Field (1965-1974)
- Location: Carrollton, Georgia
- Owner: Carrollton City Schools
- Operator: Carrollton City Schools
- Capacity: 6,500 - 8,000
- Surface: Artificial

Construction
- Opened: 1965 (as Trojan Field)
- Renovated: 2008

Tenants
- Carrollton Trojans (GHSA) (1965-present); West Georgia Wolves (NCAA D-II) (Note: NCAA D-III for 1981-1982 season) (1981-2008); Georgia Storm FC (NPSL) (2021)

Grisham Stadium, Maddox - Musselwhite Track at Historic Trojan Field is a multi-purpose stadium in Carrollton, Georgia, United States. The stadium is home to the many athletic teams at Carrollton High School and hosts various additional functions for the Carrollton City School District.

== History ==
=== Trojan Field ===
With the construction of a new Carrollton High School in 1963, (Note: See Carrollton High School (Carrollton, Georgia)#Current location.) a new athletic stadium was needed adjacent to the school building. The CHS Athletic Booster Club, a unified booster program unique for its time, raised funds to construct a new stadium, which opened on September 3, 1965, and was named Trojan Field on November 5.

=== Hugh Maddox ===
Hugh G. Maddox was a track and football coach who in his tenure during the 1950s, was able to secure five consecutive track state titles. He also led the Trojan football team to their first state championship in 1956. In 1971, the Hugh G. Maddox Track in Trojan Field was named in his honor.

=== Charlie Grisham ===
Charles Louis "Charlie" Grisham, previously serving under Maddox, was named head coach of the high school football team beginning in 1958. With a career as head coach spanning almost three decades, Grisham led the football team to sixteen regional titles and five additional state champion titles. The stadium was renamed in his honor in 1974. Grisham is the longest serving head football coach at Carrollton to date and has also been inducted into the Georgia State Athletic Hall of Fame.

=== Craig Musselwhite ===
In 2021, the Carrollton Board of Education voted to rename the track at Grisham Stadium to Maddox - Musselwhite Track, honoring the then recently retired head coach of track. During his career at the school system, Musselwhite led the track team to five state championships as an assistant coach and eight more as head coach. He also contributed to two consecutive team titles as a student at the school in 1982-1983 and achieved three individual state titles in high jump from his sophomore to senior year.

== Other tenants ==
=== West Georgia Wolves ===
The University of West Georgia, having utilized the stadium for its football team since 1981, would continue to do so until the construction of the college's own counterpart in 2009.

=== Georgia Storm FC ===
Georgia Storm FC joined the NPSL in 2020 and made its debut season in the 2021 Southeast Conference. Grisham Stadium served as the home field for the Carrollton based team before their move the University of West Georgia soccer field for 2022.

== Renovations ==
=== 2008 overhaul ===
Grisham Stadium under renovation in 2008.

In 2008, the local school board administration approved a tax-funded plan for renovations of Grisham Stadium along with the development of a new fine arts center and improvements to the nearby gymnasium. The stadium went under extensive renovations, which included a state-of-the-art artificial track and field, complete visitor's locker rooms, and updated concessions along with new home side grandstands and a three-level press box. A new grand entrance was incorporated in 2008-2009 to include a brick memorial walkway. These additions were also linked with the existing "TrojanTron" and Matrix Boards, as well as the home fieldhouse which houses the Trojan Hall of Fame. A 12-foot-tall (3.7 m) bronze Trojan monument also greeted fans upon entering the updated stadium. However, the statue was moved in 2019 to serve as the centerpiece of the newly renovated high school courtyard.

==== Funding controversy ====
There was backlash against the school district and its administration at the time due to funding for the facilities falling through. Parents and Carrollton community voices expressed displeasure and concern due to the construction plans exceeding budget and many accused the school system of neglecting the students' academic needs and wasting taxpayer money. There were others in the community that came to defend the district's decision citing the need for Carrollton students' access to athletic facilities. The stadium renovations, having already been completed when cost exceeded limits, forced the school district to delay construction of the arts center and scale down the plans of the gym renovations.

=== Other renovations ===
==== 2021 ====
In 2021, the "TrojanTron" scoreboard, having been out of operation for years, was replaced with an entirely LED based screen scoreboard system. The signage on this board and on the press box was also updated to match the newly renamed "Maddox - Musselwhite Track".

==== 2023 ====
The turf field and track were replaced in the spring and summer of 2023 respectively.
