= Central High School (Carrollton, Georgia) =

Public high school in Carrollton, Georgia, United States

Coordinates: 33°33′10″N 85°04′10″W

Location
- 113 Central High Road; Carrollton, Georgia 30116; United States

Information
- School type: Public high school
- Established: 1959 (67 years ago)
- School district: Carroll County School District
- CEEB code: 110604
- Principal: Kelly Edwards
- Teaching staff: 70.90 (FTE)
- Grades: 9-12
- Enrollment: 1,356 (2023-2024)
- Student to teacher ratio: 19.13
- Colors: Maroon and gray
- Fight song: Notre Dame Victory March
- Nickname: Lions
- Rival: Carrollton; Villa Rica
- Yearbook: The Leonine
- Website: chs.carrollcountyschools.com

Central High School is a public high school, part of the Carroll County School System, located just outside Carrollton, Georgia, United States.

== 1999 suicide pact shooting ==
On January 8, 1999, a suspected suicide pact shooting took place at the school. Students Andrea Garrett and Jeff Miller were found shot in a girls bathroom with a .22-caliber pistol nearby. Garrett was taken to the nearby Tanner Medical Center where she was shortly pronounced dead. Miller meanwhile was airlifted to Crawford Long Hospital in Atlanta. He died a day later. An investigation by the Carroll County Sheriff's Office pointed to an intended suicide plan with Central High students recalling Garrett speaking of suicide weeks before. The sheriff's office also concluded the pistol belonged to Andrea's parents and speculate a scenario where Miller shot Garrett before turning the gun on himself due to the weapon being found nearer his body.

== Racist poster controversy ==
In November 2018, a racist depiction of Stacey Abrams was shown during a student presentation during a math class at the school. The poster board of concern depicted masks with Abrams's likeness with racial stereotypes including corn and banana decorations. The teacher, having kept the poster displayed throughout multiple class periods, resigned days later, but multiple student reports to local media claimed the incident was not isolated, and only shed a glimpse into the racial harassment taking place throughout the student body. The students responsible for the initial project were suspended by administration.

== Notable alumni ==
- Mark Butler - politician
- Richard DeLong - Sacred Harp singer
- Patrick Gamble - football player
- Vicari Swain – college football cornerback and return specialist for the South Carolina Gamecocks
- Jonaz Walton – college football running back for the Notre Dame Fighting Irish

== See also ==
- Carroll County School District (Georgia)
