= Patrick Gamble =

Patrick Gamble may refer to:

- Patrick K. Gamble (born 1945), United States Air Force general and academic administrator
- Patrick Gamble (American football) (born 1994), American football defensive end
