= Brandon Tolbert =

American football player (born 1975)

No. 50
- Position: Linebacker

Personal information
- Born: April 6, 1975 (age 51); Villa Rica, Georgia, U.S.
- Listed height: 6 ft 3 in (1.91 m)
- Listed weight: 230 lb (104 kg)

Career information
- High school: Villa Rica (GA)
- College: Georgia
- NFL draft: 1998: 7th round, 214th overall pick

Career history
- Jacksonville Jaguars (1998)*; Atlanta Falcons (1998)*; Dallas Cowboys (1998–2000); New Orleans Saints (2001)*
- * Offseason or practice squad member only

Awards and highlights
- Second-team All-SEC (1996)

Brandon Scott Tolbert (born April 6, 1975) is an American former football linebacker in the National Football League (NFL). He played college football at the University of Georgia. He never played in a regular season NFL game.

== Early life ==
Tolbert attended Villa Rica High School, where he was a three-year starter at strong safety. He also saw playing time as a wide receiver and running back. He was a two-time All-county selection and was named first-team Class AA All-State by the Atlanta Journal-Constitution as a senior. He was named the Most Valuable Player of the 1992 Georgia North-South All-star game.

In baseball, he was a three-year starter and received All-county honors at outfielder as a senior.

== College career ==
Tolbert accepted a football scholarship from the University of Georgia, where he was converted from strong safety into a linebacker. As a redshirt freshman, he appeared in 9 games and played only on special teams, making 6 tackles.

As a sophomore, he appeared in 9 games with 6 starts at outside linebacker. He missed 2 contests with an injury. He played most of the season behind Randall Godfrey, making 74 tackles (fourth on the team) and 5 tackles for loss (second on the team). He averaged 10 tackles per game in the last 8 contests, while Godfrey was limited with a pulled hamstring. He had 13 tackles and one interception against the University of Kentucky. He had 12 tackles against the University of Florida. He started in the 1995 Peach Bowl, making 5 tackles and one sack.

As a junior, he started all 11 games at strongside linebacker, posting 116 tackles (second on the team). He had a career-high 19 tackles against the University of Kentucky and earned SEC Defensive Player of the Week honors for his 18-tackle performance against Texas Tech University.

As a senior, he started all 11 games and was one of the team's captains. He registered 67 tackles (third on the team) and one interception. He also had one interception in the 1998 Outback Bowl. He finished his college career with 270 tackles, 6.5 sacks, 2 interceptions and one fumble recovery.

== Professional career ==
=== Jacksonville Jaguars ===
Tolbert was selected by the Jacksonville Jaguars in the seventh round (214th overall) of the 1998 NFL draft. He was waived injured on August 24.

=== Atlanta Falcons ===
On September 2, 1998, he was signed by the Atlanta Falcons to their practice squad. He suffered a pulled hamstring and was released with an injury settlement on September 23.

=== Dallas Cowboys ===
On November 24, 1998, he was signed by the Dallas Cowboys to their practice squad. On December 7, he was promoted to the active roster. He was declared inactive for the final 3 games and the playoffs.

In 1999, he suffered a torn right ACL during a practice and was placed on the injured reserve list on August 24. In 2000, he tore his left ACL in the fourth preseason game against the Denver Broncos and was placed on waivers-injured reserve on August 21. He wasn't re-signed after the season.

=== New Orleans Saints ===
On June 4, 2001, he was signed as a free agent by the New Orleans Saints. He was released on August 9, 2001.
