= Villa Rica High School =

Public high school in Villa Rica, Georgia

- Villa Rica High School Wildcats logo

Location
- 600 Rocky Branch Road; Villa Rica, Georgia 30180; United States; 33°43′41″N 84°56′46″W

Information
- School type: Public high school
- School district: Carroll County School District
- CEEB code: 113130
- Staff: 85.90 (FTE)
- Grades: 9-12
- Enrollment: 1,795 (2023-2024)
- Student to teacher ratio: 20.90
- Colors: Purple and gold
- Nickname: Wildcats
- Rival: Carrollton; Central
- Website: www.villaricahigh.com

Villa Rica High School is a public high school, part of the Carroll County School System, located in Villa Rica, Georgia. The school's mascot is the Wildcat.

== Controversies ==
=== Football team mass baptism ===
In 2015, the school came under scrutiny for allowing a local pastor to perform mass baptisms on the school football team during an official on-campus practice. The Freedom From Religion Foundation threatened legal action against the school district if steps were not taken to prevent a recurrence. An investigation by the school district concluded that the school "failed to follow district facility usage procedures for outside groups using school facilities". A miscommunication was later claimed between the head football coach and pastor regarding ability to perform such actions on a public school campus.

=== Basketball game fight ===
On January 25, 2022, a fight broke out at a basketball game against Lithia Springs High School that took place at the Villa Rica school gym. The fight, which started in the stands, spilled onto the court and caused the game to be suspended. After an investigation, authorities charged seven teenagers with affray and disruption of a public school.

=== Villa Rica Teacher Arrested ===
On February 16, 2024, District notified police on Feb. 16 about an allegation that a Villa Rica High School employee was involved in an inappropriate relationship with a student.

== Notable alumni ==
- Jae Crowder, NBA player
- Brandon Tolbert, former NFL player
- Herman Weaver, former NFL player
