= Dontavius Russell =

American football player (born 1995)

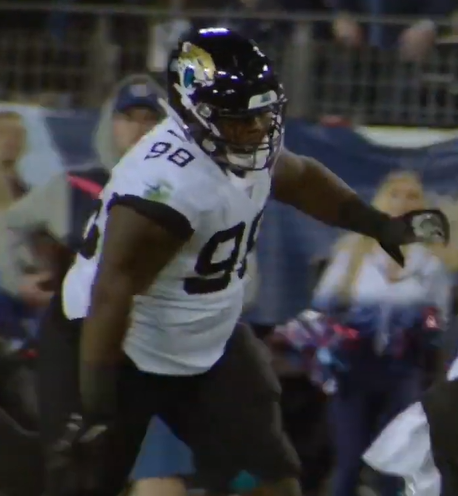
- Russell with the Jacksonville Jaguars in 2019

No. 98
- Position: Defensive tackle

Personal information
- Born: September 18, 1995 (age 31); Carrollton, Georgia, U.S.
- Listed height: 6 ft 3 in (1.91 m)
- Listed weight: 319 lb (145 kg)

Career information
- High school: Carrollton
- College: Auburn
- NFL draft: 2019: 7th round, 235th overall pick

Career history
- Jacksonville Jaguars (2019–2020)

Career NFL statistics
- Total tackles: 3
- Stats at Pro Football Reference

Dontavius Russell (born September 18, 1995) is an American former professional football player who was a defensive tackle for the Jacksonville Jaguars of the National Football League (NFL). He played college football for the Auburn Tigers and was selected by the Jaguars in the seventh round of the 2019 NFL draft.

== Professional career ==
Russell was selected by the Jacksonville Jaguars in the seventh round of the 2019 NFL draft with the 235th overall pick.

On August 9, 2020, Russell was placed on injured reserve with a minor hip injury. He was waived on March 17, 2021.
