= Margie Alexander =

American gospel and soul singer (1926–2013)

Background information
- Also known as: Margie Babbs
- Born: Marjorie Lucille Alexander; October 11, 1948; Carrollton, Georgia, U.S.
- Died: March 26, 2013 (aged 64)
- Genres: Soul, gospel
- Occupation: Singer
- Instrument: Vocals
- Years active: 1968–1990s
- Labels: Atlantic, Future Stars, Chi-Sound, Startown, Soul Potion

Marjorie Lucille "Margie" Alexander (October 11, 1948 – March 26, 2013) was an American gospel and soul singer, mainly noted for her recordings in the 1970s.

== Biography ==
Alexander was born in Carrollton, Georgia, the third of six children. She attended, and began singing in, Piney Grove Baptist Church, and graduated from Carver High School in Carrollton.

By the mid-1960s she was a member of the Gospel Crusaders of Los Angeles. In 1968, she started singing at the Club 400 in Atlanta, and joined Clarence Carter's band as a back-up singer. By 1971 she had a recording contract with Atlantic Records, where Clarence Carter produced the single "Can I Be Your Main Thing", written by Hubert Carter and featuring electronic piano by Clayton Ivey. Although the record was not a hit, it has subsequently been widely anthologised as a classic example of Southern soul music.

After Clarence Carter founded his own label, Future Stars, Alexander continued to record with him, her biggest success coming with "Keep On Searching", which Carter wrote and produced, and which reached # 50 on the Billboard R&B chart in 1974. In 1976 she signed with Chi-Sound, a record label started by Carl Davis (producer of Gene Chandler's "Duke of Earl") which was distributed by United Artists Records. She had two minor hits on Chi-Sound in 1977, "It's Worth a Whippin'", produced by Major Lance and Otis Leavill (# 92 R&B), and "Gotta Get A Hold On Me" (# 68 R&B).

In 1992 she released a gospel album, God Is In Control, on the Soul Potion label. She married John E. Babbs in 1997, and in 2009, as Margie Babbs, was reported as singing at a church in Carrollton, Georgia. She died on March 26, 2013, at the age of 64.

== Discography ==
=== Singles ===
- "Can I Be Your Main Thing" / "It Can't Last Forever" (Atlantic 2828, 1971)
- "Love Slave" / "Keep On Searching" (Future Stars 1005, 1974)
- "It's Worth A Whippin'" / "Take My Body" (Chi-Sound 17605, 1976)
- "Gotta Get A Hold On Me" / "What'cha Trying To Do To Me" (Chi-Sound 1033, 1977)
- "Looking Back" / "Blue Vibrations" (Startown 005, 1984)

=== Albums ===
- God Is In Control (Soul-Po-Tion Records, 1992)
