= Chaz Chambliss =

American football player (born 2002)

No. 32 – Minnesota Vikings
- Position: Outside linebacker
- Roster status: Active

Personal information
- Born: October 25, 2002 (age 24); Carrollton, Georgia, U.S.
- Listed height: 6 ft 1 in (1.85 m)
- Listed weight: 244 lb (111 kg)

Career information
- High school: Carrollton (GA)
- College: Georgia (2021–2024)
- NFL draft: 2025: undrafted

Career history
- Minnesota Vikings (2025–present)

Awards and highlights
- 2× CFP national champion (2021, 2022); Third-team All-SEC (2024)

Career NFL statistics as of Week 10, 2026
- Total tackles: 18
- Sacks: 1.0
- Stats at Pro Football Reference

Charles Alexander "Chaz" Chambliss (born October 25, 2002) is an American professional football outside linebacker for the Minnesota Vikings of the National Football League (NFL). He played college football for the Georgia Bulldogs.

== Early life ==
Chambliss attended Carrollton High School in Carrollton, Georgia. He was rated as a four-star recruit and committed to play college football for the Georgia Bulldogs. He received offers from other schools such as Alabama, LSU, Tennessee, Clemson, Florida State, Notre Dame, Ohio State.

== College career ==
In his first three seasons from 2021 to 2023, Chambliss appeared in 40 games, where he totaled 46 tackles with eight being for a loss, two and a half sacks, three pass deflections, and an interception, while also winning two national championships in 2021 and 2022. In week 7 of the 2024 season, he recorded three tackles with one going for a loss in a win over Mississippi State. In week 10, Chambliss notched six tackles, with two and a half being for a loss, and two sacks in a win over Florida, and was named the Co-SEC defensive player of the week.

== Professional career ==
Pre-draft measurables
Height	Weight	Arm length	Hand span	Wingspan	20-yard shuttle	Three-cone drill	Vertical jump	Broad jump	Bench press
6 ft 2 1/4 in (1.89 m)	245 lb (111 kg)	31 3/8 in (0.80 m)	9 1/2 in (0.24 m)	6 ft 4 3/4 in (1.95 m)	4.39 s	7.05 s	32.0 in (0.81 m)	10 ft 0 in (3.05 m)	30 reps
All values from Pro Day

Chambliss signed with the Minnesota Vikings as an undrafted free agent on April 26, 2025. He made the initial 53-man roster on August 26, 2025. He was one of the seven undrafted free agents that made the Vikings roster.
