= Dylan Parham =

American football player (born 1999)

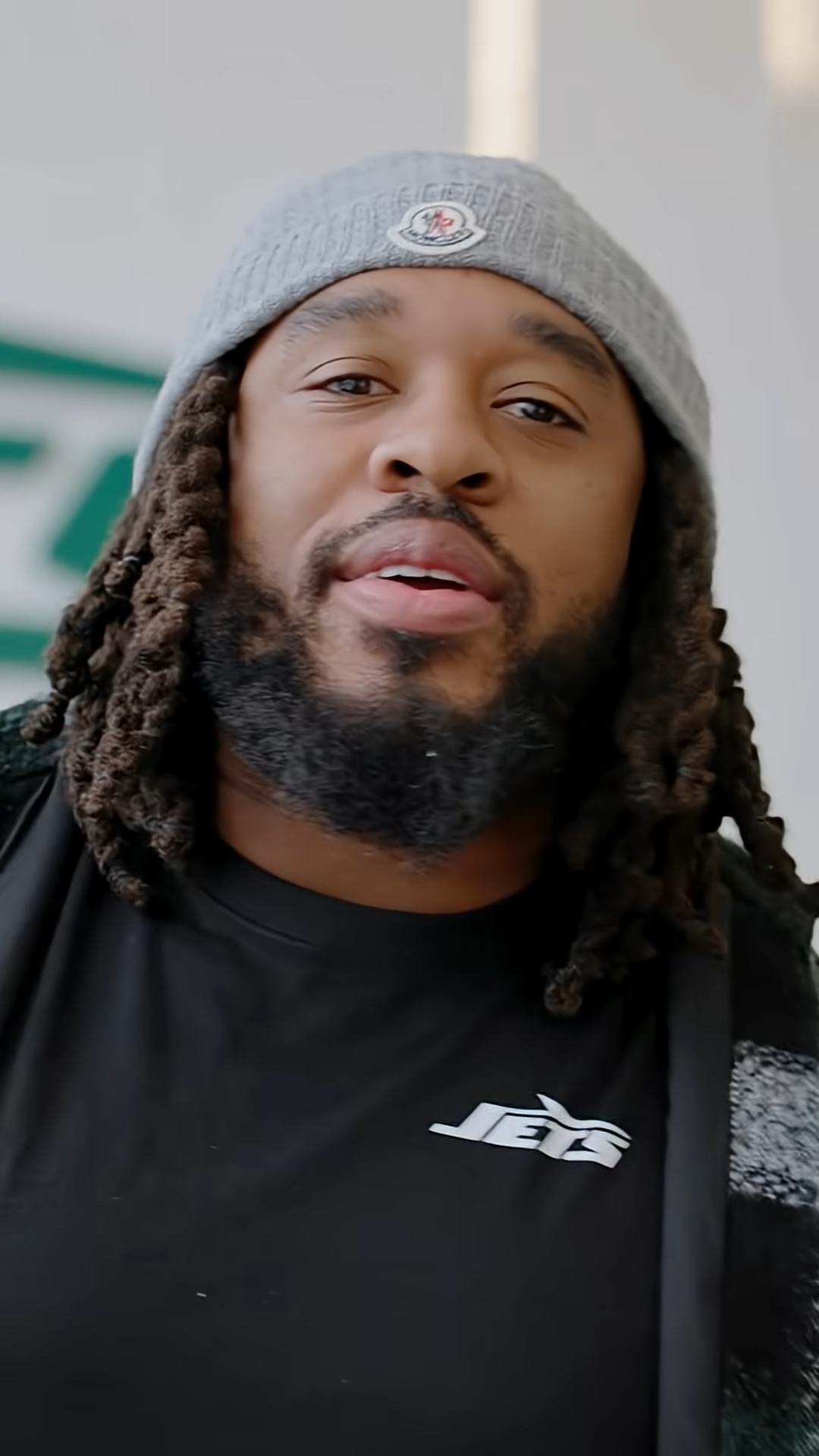
- Parham with the New York Jets in 2026

No. 64 – New York Jets
- Position: Guard
- Roster status: Active

Personal information
- Born: August 24, 1999 (age 27); Carrollton, Georgia, U.S.
- Listed height: 6 ft 3 in (1.91 m)
- Listed weight: 311 lb (141 kg)

Career information
- High school: Carrollton
- College: Memphis (2017–2021)
- NFL draft: 2022: 3rd round, 90th overall pick

Career history
- Las Vegas Raiders (2022–2025); New York Jets (2026–present)

Awards and highlights
- PFWA All-Rookie Team (2022); First-team All-AAC (2021)

Career NFL statistics as of Week 10, 2026
- Games played: 70
- Games started: 69
- Stats at Pro Football Reference

Dylan Parham (born August 24, 1999) is an American professional football offensive guard for the New York Jets of the National Football League (NFL). He played college football for the Memphis Tigers and was selected by the Las Vegas Raiders in the third round of the 2022 NFL draft.

== Early life ==
Parham grew up in Carrollton, Georgia, and attended Carrollton High School, where he was a member of the basketball, football, and track and field teams. He originally played linebacker before moving to tight end before his senior season. Parham was used mostly in a blocking capacity as a senior and was named first team All-Area after nine passes for 96 yards and one touchdown and the Carrollton Trojans gained 4,200 yards of total offense. Parham was rated a two-star recruit and committed to play college football at Memphis over offers from Georgia State and West Virginia.

== College career ==
Parham redshirted his true freshman season at Memphis and moved from tight end to the offensive line. He was named the Tigers' starting left guard going into his redshirt freshman season. Parham started all 14 of Memphis' games in both his redshirt freshman and sophomore seasons. He was moved to the center position during spring practice after his redshirt sophomore year, but was moved again to right tackle prior to the start of the 2020 season. Parham started all 11 of the Tigers' games in 2020. He was moved to right guard going into his redshirt senior season and was named first team All-American Athletic Conference (AAC).

== Professional career ==
Pre-draft measurables
Height	Weight	Arm length	Hand span	Wingspan	40-yard dash	10-yard split	20-yard split	20-yard shuttle	Three-cone drill	Vertical jump	Broad jump	Bench press
6 ft 2 5/8 in (1.90 m)	311 lb (141 kg)	33 1/8 in (0.84 m)	10 1/4 in (0.26 m)	6 ft 6 7/8 in (2.00 m)	4.93 s	1.74 s	2.84 s	4.70 s	7.78 s	26.5 in (0.67 m)	9 ft 0 in (2.74 m)	25 reps
All values from NFL Combine/Pro Day

=== Las Vegas Raiders ===
Parham was selected in the third round (90th overall) by the Las Vegas Raiders in the 2022 NFL draft. He was named to the PFWA All-Rookie Team. On November 29, 2024, with 15 seconds left in a Week 13 game against the Kansas City Chiefs, he gave the signal to the center to snap the ball despite quarterback Aidan O'Connell not being ready. This resulted in a bad snap that was recovered by the Chiefs, losing the game for the Raiders.

=== New York Jets ===
On March 13, 2026, Parham signed a two-year, $20 million contract with the New York Jets.
