= Jamie Henderson (American football) =

American football player (born 1979)

No. 23
- Position: Cornerback

Personal information
- Born: January 1, 1979 (age 47); Carrollton, Georgia, U.S.
- Listed height: 6 ft 2 in (1.88 m)
- Listed weight: 202 lb (92 kg)

Career information
- High school: Carrollton
- College: Mississippi Gulf Coast CC; Georgia
- NFL draft: 2001: 4th round, 101st overall pick

Career history
- New York Jets (2001–2004)

Career NFL statistics
- Tackles: 59
- Interceptions: 1
- INT yards: 5
- Stats at Pro Football Reference

Jamie Henderson (born January 1, 1979) is an American former professional football player who was a cornerback for the New York Jets of the National Football League (NFL). He played college football for the Georgia Bulldogs and was selected by the Jets in the fourth round of the 2001 NFL draft. He played for the Jets from 2001 to 2003. Jamie Henderson is married to Natascha Fulmore-Henderson. They have 5 kids whise names are Jalen, Jamie Jr, Adejianna, Justice and Sanaa. He is the cousin of former NFL football player Reggie Brown. He has two sons. Henderson attended Carrollton High School, as well as Reggie Brown, and played for the Carrollton Trojan football team.

== Motorcycle Accident ==
On April 3, 2004, Henderson got in a motorcycle accident. He lost control of the bike while making a turn. There was no indication that Henderson was speeding or that alcohol or drugs were involved in the accident. He has since gained full recovery from the accident and held positions at the University of West Georgia in Carrollton, Georgia and Murray State University as a defensive backs coach. He was a paraprofessional at Carrollton Jr. High School and was helping coach track and football at Carrollton High School, Carrollton, Georgia.
