= North Villa Rica Commercial Historic District =

Historic district in Georgia, United States

- U.S. National Register of Historic Places
- U.S. Historic district
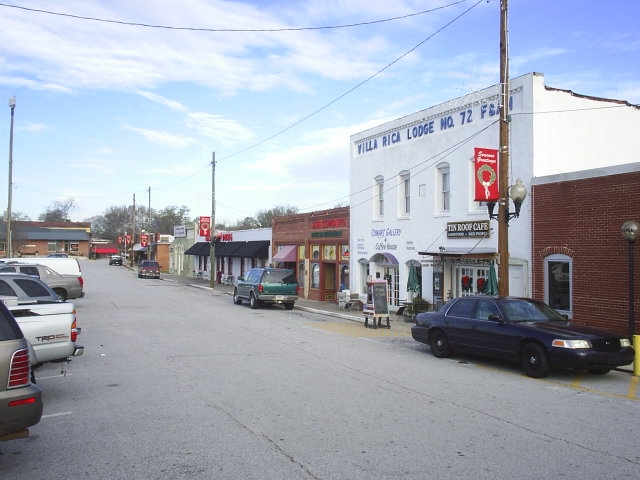
- A picture of the businesses on Temple Street in the Historic District.

- Location within Georgia
- Location: Villa Rica, Georgia
- Built: earliest ca. 1907-1955
- Architectural style: Early commercial style
- NRHP reference No.: 02001635
- Added to NRHP: December 31, 2002

The North Villa Rica Commercial Historic District in Villa Rica, Georgia, was added to the National Register of Historic Places on December 31, 2002. The original application included eighteen buildings spread out over several blocks. The buildings were built in the early commercial style and date from the early to mid-20th century. This area houses the City of Villa Rica Police Department along with several antique stores, restaurants, and other commercial businesses. The boundary is basically North Avenue, East Gordon St, West Church St, and the Southern Railroad line.

The district lost two significant buildings contributing to the National Register on the east in July 2009. The city demolished the old Villa Rica Electric & Light and E.L. Esterwood mill (later known as Golden City Hosiery) for greenspace, amphitheater and future new city hall.

The Villa Rica Electric & Light made ice and also was the local bottler for Coca-Cola from 1903 to 1923 in the hometown of Asa Candler.

The district is also referred to as Hixtown, the original name of Villa Rica. However, this can cause confusion since this is not where Hixtown was originally located. Hixtown was first settled about a mile and a half up Georgia State Route 61 near where Tanner Medical Center Villa Rica currently sits. When the railroad came through in 1882, many of the buildings from Hixtown were moved to what is now the North Villa Rica Commercial Historic District and thus the reference to Hixtown. Local lore states the last of these moved buildings was demolished for a parking lot in the 1990s beside the Lofts.
