= Mount Zion High School (Carrollton, Georgia) =

Public high school in Carrollton, Georgia, United States

Location
- 280 Eureka Church Road; Carrollton, Georgia 30117; United States
- Coordinates: 33°36′08″N 85°09′23″W

Information
- School type: Public high school
- School district: Carroll County School District
- CEEB code: 112215
- Principal: Landon Odom
- Teaching staff: 26.20 (FTE)
- Grades: 9-12
- Enrollment: 471 (2023–2024)
- Student to teacher ratio: 17.98
- Colors: Red and gray
- Nickname: Eagles
- Website: mzh.carrollcountyschools.com
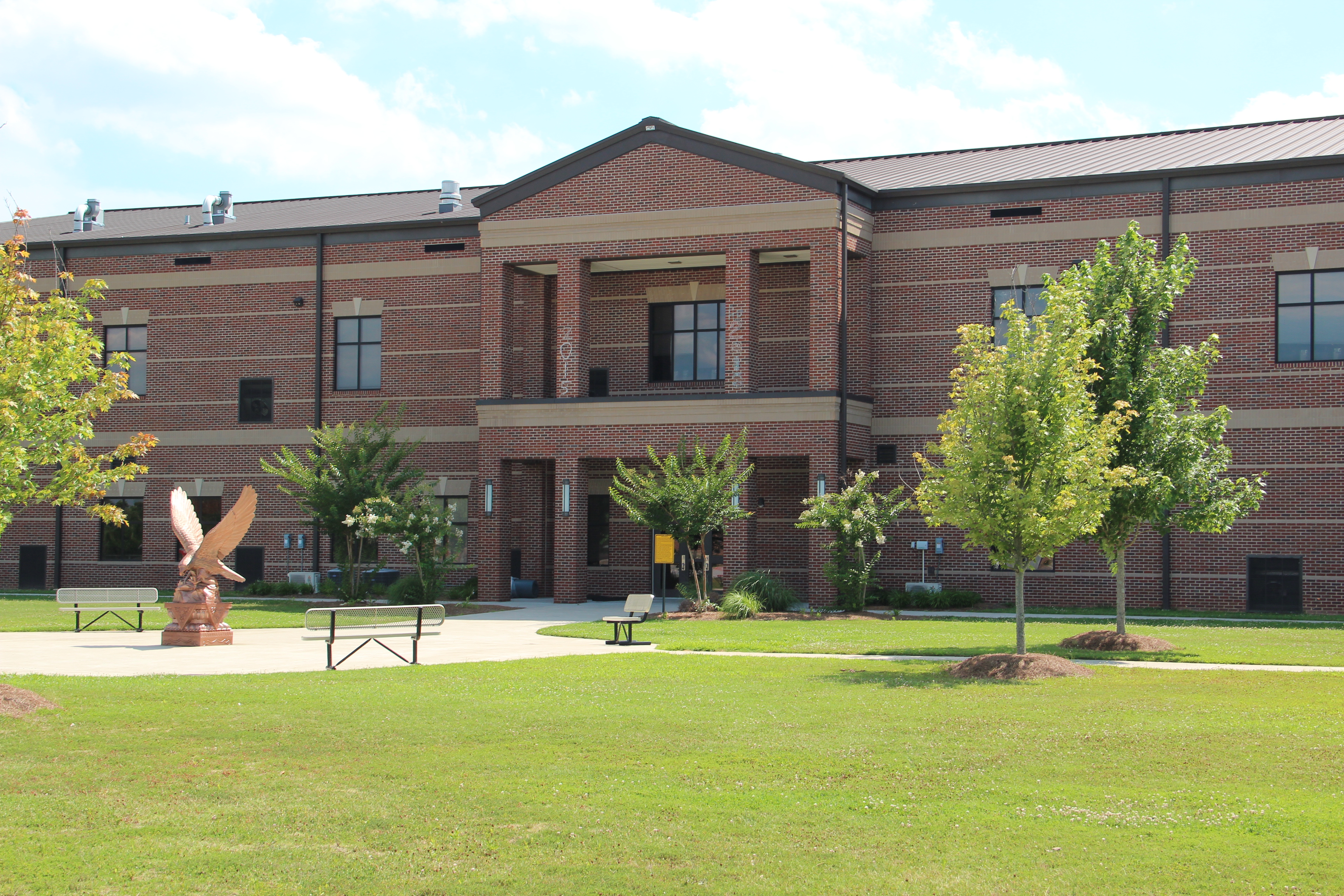

Mount Zion High School is a public high school, part of the Carroll County School System, located west of Carrollton, Georgia, United States and serving the community of Mount Zion, Georgia. The school's mascot is the Eagle.
