= Reggie Brown (wide receiver, born 1981) =

American football player (born 1981)

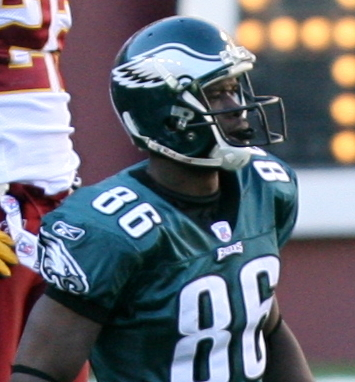
- Brown with the Philadelphia Eagles in 2006

No. 86
- Position: Wide receiver

Personal information
- Born: January 13, 1981 (age 45); Carrollton, Georgia, U.S.
- Listed height: 6 ft 1 in (1.85 m)
- Listed weight: 197 lb (89 kg)

Career information
- High school: Carrollton
- College: Georgia (2000–2004)
- NFL draft: 2005: 2nd round, 35th overall pick

Career history
- Philadelphia Eagles (2005–2009); Tampa Bay Buccaneers (2010)*
- * Offseason or practice squad member only

Awards and highlights
- First-team All-SEC (2004)

Career NFL statistics
- Receptions: 177
- Receiving yards: 2,574
- Receiving average: 14.5
- Receiving touchdowns: 17
- Stats at Pro Football Reference

Reggie Brown (born January 13, 1981) is an American former professional football player who was a wide receiver in the National Football League (NFL). He played college football for the Georgia Bulldogs and was selected by the Philadelphia Eagles in the second round of the 2005 NFL draft. Brown was also a member of the Tampa Bay Buccaneers.

== Early life ==
Brown was a Parade All-American wide receiver at Carrollton High School, while leading the Trojans to back-to-back state championship berths and a 1998 Georgia High School Association Class AA title. He is the cousin of former New York Jets player and a current University of West Georgia defensive backs coach, Jamie Henderson (also a Carrollton High School graduate).

== College career ==
In college at the University of Georgia, Brown was highly touted receiver coming into his freshman year, but injuries held him back during his four years of college. He was the number three receiver in his freshman and sophomore years behind Terrence Edwards and Fred Gibson. During his junior and senior years, Brown was a top performer with Gibson. As a senior in 2005, Brown caught 53 passes for 860 yards and six touchdowns.

== Professional career ==
Pre-draft measurables
Height	Weight	Arm length	Hand span	40-yard dash	10-yard split	20-yard split	20-yard shuttle	Three-cone drill	Vertical jump	Broad jump
6 ft 1 5/8 in (1.87 m)	196 lb (89 kg)	31 3/8 in (0.80 m)	9 3/8 in (0.24 m)	4.51 s	1.62 s	2.68 s	3.94 s	6.99 s	41.5 in (1.05 m)	10 ft 8 in (3.25 m)
All values from NFL Combine

=== Philadelphia Eagles ===
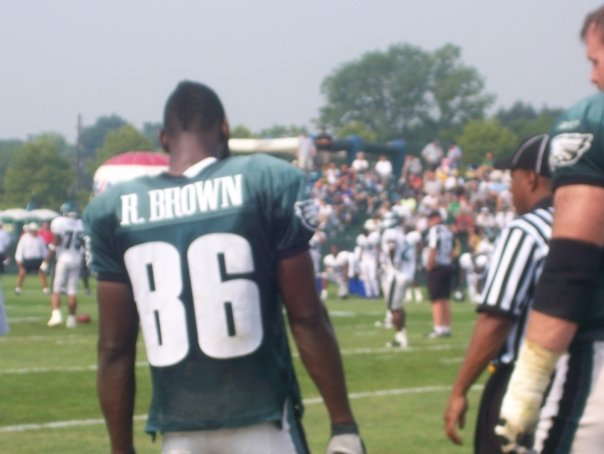
Brown at the Eagles training camp

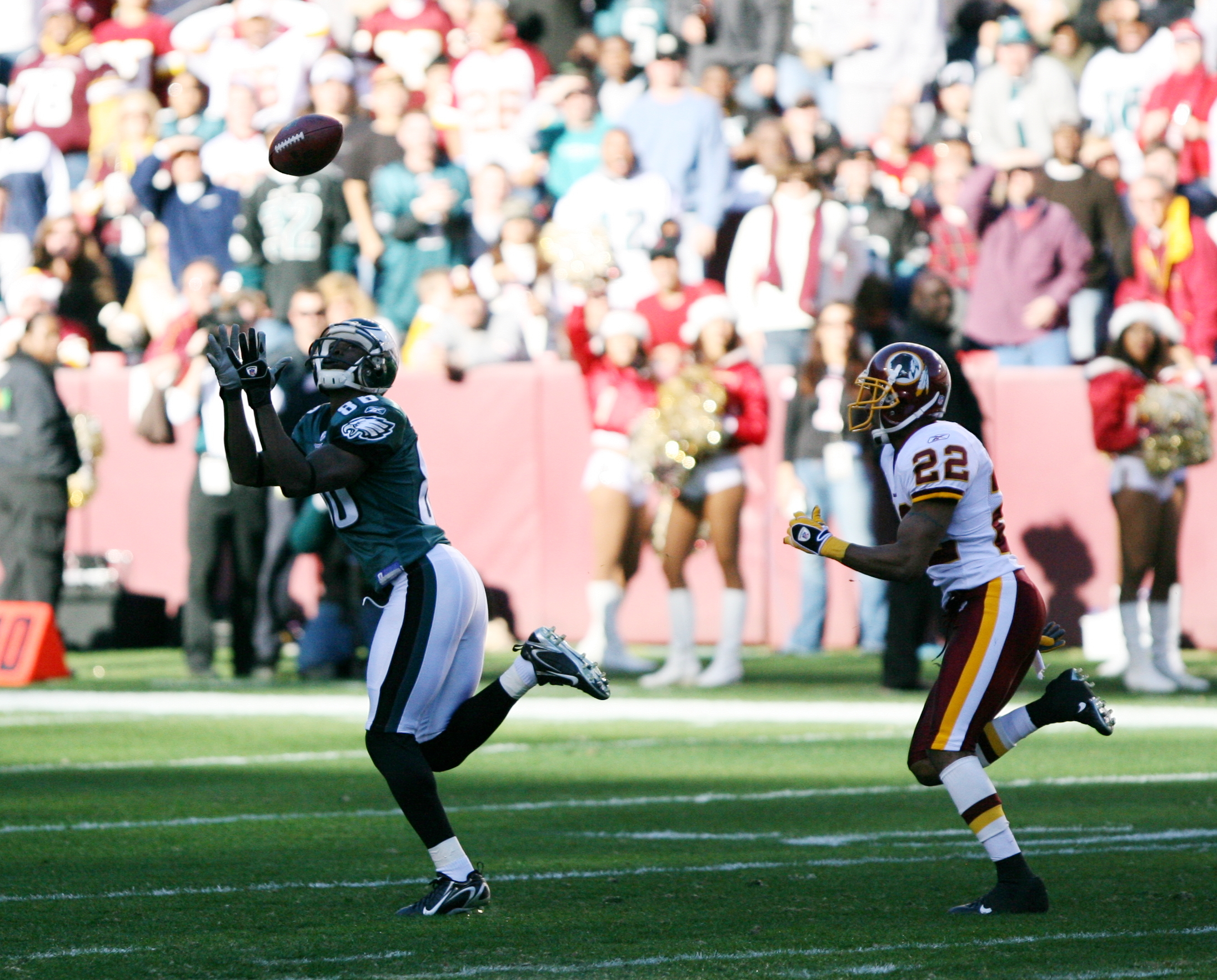
Brown goes out for a catch in a game against the Redskins

Brown was drafted by the Philadelphia Eagles in the second round of the 2005 NFL draft.

In 2005, his rookie season, Brown was promoted to the starting spot of suspended wide receiver Terrell Owens. In his first start on November 6, 2005, Brown caught five passes for 94 yards and one touchdown against the Washington Redskins. In his second meeting against the division-rival Redskins, he caught two first half touchdowns. This impressive performance capped a promising year for the rookie. Brown led all rookies with 571 yards and was second with 43 receptions.

With the off-season departures of Owens and Todd Pinkston, Brown became the number-one wideout for the Eagles in 2006. He had nearly 18 yards per catch on 816 receiving yards and eight touchdowns for the year.

On November 9, 2006, Brown agreed to a 6-year contract extension with the Eagles. The deal, which locked him up through 2014, was worth up to $27 million, with $10 million in guarantees.

On December 16, 2007, during a game in Dallas against the rival Cowboys, Brown, after running to catch an overthrown pass, ran out of bounds and jumped in the giant Salvation Army bucket in Texas Stadium, saying he couldn't slow down in time to stop before it. He caught the lone touchdown in the Eagles 10–6 win that day.

In the 2008 season, Brown was often injured and eventually lost his starting job to rookie DeSean Jackson. He also fell behind slot receiver Jason Avant and receiver Kevin Curtis on the depth chart. He was inactive in the NFC Championship Game loss at the Arizona Cardinals.

In the 2009 season, Brown produced only 9 catches for 155 yards and no touchdowns. He only started in one game (due to Jeremy Maclin being inactive with a leg injury), in which he caught only one pass for 7 yards. He was inactive for the first two games of the season, and completely fell behind Desean Jackson, Jeremy Maclin and Jason Avant as the team's fourth receiver.

=== Tampa Bay Buccaneers ===
On March 8, 2010, Brown was traded to the Tampa Bay Buccaneers for a sixth round pick in the 2011 NFL draft. He was released on September 6, 2010.

== Career statistics ==
=== NFL ===
Legend
**Bold**	Career high

==== Regular season ====
Year	Team	Games		Receiving					
Year	Team	GP	GS	Tgt	Rec	Yds	Avg	Lng	TD
2005	PHI	**16**	11	79	43	571	13.3	56	4
2006	PHI	**16**	**15**	88	46	**816**	**17.7**	**60**	**8**
2007	PHI	**16**	14	**111**	**61**	780	12.8	45	4
2008	PHI	10	3	35	18	252	14.0	40	1
2009	PHI	14	2	24	9	155	17.2	43	0
Career		72	45	337	177	2,574	14.5	60	17

==== Playoffs ====
Year	Team	Games		Receiving					
Year	Team	GP	GS	Tgt	Rec	Yds	Avg	Lng	TD
2006	PHI	**2**	**2**	**16**	**10**	**149**	**14.9**	**32**	0
2008	PHI	**2**	0	2	2	17	8.5	9	0
2009	PHI	1	0	3	0	0	0.0	0	0
Career		5	2	21	12	166	13.8	32	0

=== College ===
	Receiving			
YR	REC	YDS	TD	AVG
2000	14	139	1	9.9
2001	6	47	0	7.8
2002	23	296	2	12.9
2003	49	662	3	13.5
2004	53	860	6	16.2
