= Carrollton, Georgia =

- City
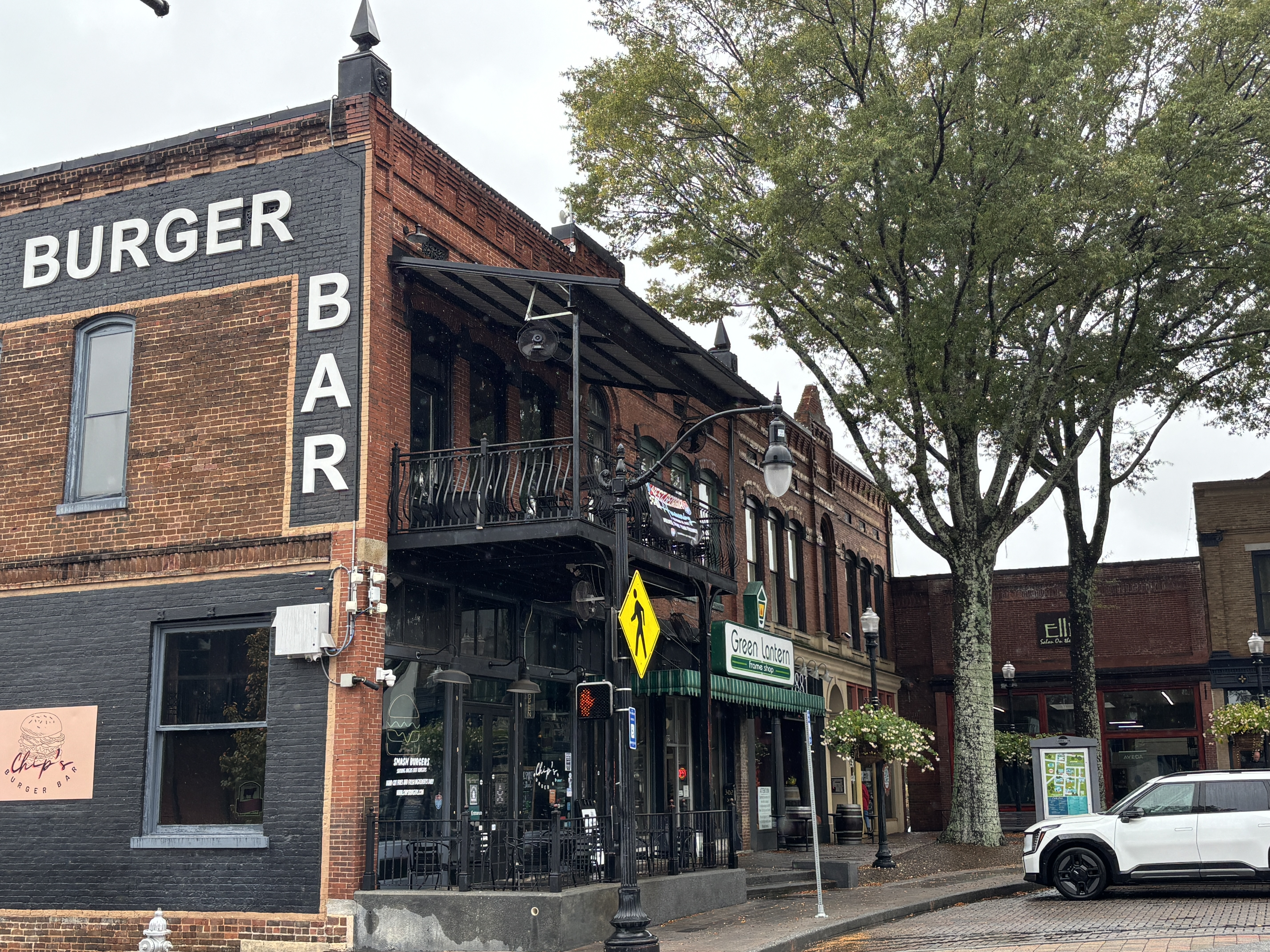
- Businesses in Adamson Square

- Flag Logo
- Motto: "Altogether Original"
- Location in Carroll County and the state of Georgia
- Coordinates: 33°34′51″N 85°4′36″W
- Country: United States
- State: Georgia
- County: Carroll
- Incorporated: 1829

Government
  - Mayor: Betty Cason
  - City Manager: David Brooks
  - City Council: Stacie Gibbs; Brett Ledbetter; Bob Uglum; Jacqulene Bridges

Area
  - Total: 23.05 sq mi (59.70 km^{2})
  - Land: 22.49 sq mi (58.25 km^{2})
  - Water: 0.56 sq mi (1.45 km^{2})
- Elevation: 1,102 ft (336 m)

Population (2020)
  - Total: 26,738
  - Density: 1,189.0/sq mi (459.06/km^{2})
- Time zone: UTC−5 (EST)
  - Summer (DST): UTC−4 (EDT)
- ZIP Codes: 30112, 30116, 30117, 30118, 30119
- Area codes: 470, 678, 770
- FIPS code: 13-13492
- GNIS feature ID: 0325833
- Website: carrolltonga.com

Carrollton is a city in and the county seat of Carroll County, Georgia, United States. It is within western Georgia, about 45 miles (72 km) west of Atlanta near the Alabama state line, and is included in the Atlanta metropolitan area. It is the home of the University of West Georgia and West Georgia Technical College. In 2020, the city had a population of 26,738.

== History ==
Carroll County, of which Carrollton is the county seat, was chartered in 1826, and was governed at the time by the Carroll Inferior Court, which consisted of five elected justices. In 1829, the justices voted to move the county seat from the site it occupied near the present community of Sandhill, to a new site about 8 miles (13 km) to the southwest.

The original intention was to call the new county seat "Troupville", in honor of former governor George Troup, but Troup was not popular with the state government of the time, so the Georgia General Assembly incorporated the town as Carrollton, in December 1829. The name was in honor of Charles Carroll of Carrollton, the last living signer of the Declaration of Independence.

In 1830, the town was surveyed and lots were laid out, with the central feature being the town square, which was later named Adamson Square, for local judge and congressman William C. Adamson.

Although it was the county seat and the main market town for most of Carroll County, transportation of both goods and passengers was difficult until the coming of the railroad in 1874, so Carrollton remained largely a frontier town until well after the Civil War.

The coming of the railroad brought new prosperity to Carrollton. Farmers were able to bring their crops, mostly cotton, to town for shipment to distant markets, and obtain the fertilizers and agricultural supplies they needed. At the same time, consumer goods were more readily available than ever before.

The railroad also encouraged the growth of the fledgling industrial ventures, especially in the textile industry, in and around Carrollton. These early textile mills, mostly water powered, served as the basis for a textile industry that helped ensure the town's prosperity well into the 20th century.

At the start of the 20th century, Carrollton boasted running water and had electric lighting and telephone service. The town began paving its streets in 1918.

In 1906, Carrollton was chosen as the site of the Fourth District Agricultural and Mechanical School, which became West Georgia College in 1934, and is now a 12,834-student university, the University of West Georgia. In May 1964 Robert F. Kennedy visited Carrollton for the dedication of Kennedy Chapel on the university campus.

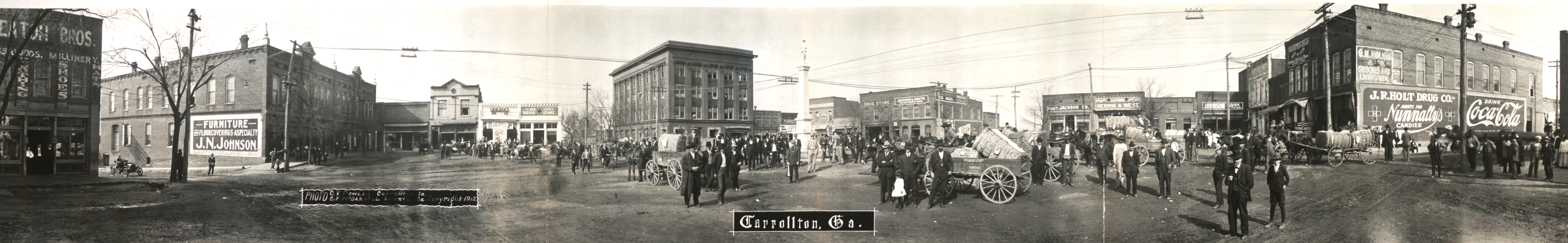
Panorama of Carrollton's Adamson Square c. 1912

Carrollton remained an agricultural and textile manufacturing center throughout the first half of the 20th century, but as the local production of cotton declined and the population became more urban, other industries began to take on a greater prominence. Most notable is the Southwire Company. Founded in Carrollton in 1950, Southwire is now one of the world's largest manufacturers of wire and cable and is the largest privately owned wire manufacturer, with more than 1,500 local employees and 5,000 employees worldwide.

This diversification of industry has continued into the 21st century, aided in part by Carrollton's ready access to Interstate 20 and the Norfolk Southern Railway. The city's major employers presently include companies in the airline, construction, power distribution, poultry, software, home entertainment, and healthcare industries, among others.

Carrollton also remains an important market town, with a wide variety of national retail chains and restaurants, serving Carroll County and the surrounding region.

Carrollton was mentioned in Margaret Mitchell's 1936 novel Gone with the Wind and in the 1939 movie of the same name. Carrollton featured in the 1983 TV movie Murder in Coweta County, although the Carrollton scenes were not actually filmed there. Other films shot in the Carrollton area include Conjurer with John Schneider, The Way Home with Dean Cain, and Between Love and a Hard Place with Bern Nadette Stanis. Carrollton was the home of actress Susan Hayward.

On August 21, 1995, Atlantic Southeast Airlines Flight 529 crashed near Carrollton. Nine of the 29 passengers and crew on board were killed as a result of the accident.

The city attracted news media attention amidst allegations of censorship in September 2011 when the then mayor, Wayne Garner, overruled the board of the city-owned Carrollton Cultural Arts Center in order to ban as "very offensive" the live stage musical The Rocky Horror Show that had been scheduled for a run just before Halloween. The theater board had authorized use of the venue and appropriated $2,500 for the show, which was already in rehearsal. News reports attributed the mayor's decision to his being shown by the city manager a video of the rehearsal posted by a cast member to a personal Facebook page. In February 2012, three months later than originally planned, the show was produced and privately funded without city money at the Townsend Center for the Performing Arts at the University of West Georgia, also in Carrollton. The Virginia-based anti-censorship Thomas Jefferson Center for the Protection of Free Expression gave one of its national 2012 "Muzzle" awards to the mayor "for appointing himself the arbiter of cultural taste for an entire town, and canceling a pre-approved production of The Rocky Horror Show at a city-owned theater."

== Geography ==
Carrollton is located near the center of Carroll County at 33°34′51″N 85°4′36″W (33.580912, -85.076704). The Little Tallapoosa River flows through the northwestern part of the city. U.S. Route 27 passes through the city center, leading north 9 miles (14 km) to Interstate 20 in Bremen and south 42 miles (68 km) to LaGrange. U.S. Route 27 Alternate leads southeast from the city 23 mi (37 km) to Newnan. Other more local roads that pass through the city include Georgia State Routes 16, 113, and 166.

According to the United States Census Bureau, Carrollton has a total area of 22.8 square miles (59.1 km^{2}), of which 22.3 square miles (57.7 km^{2}) is land and 0.54 square miles (1.4 km^{2}), or 2.37%, is water.

=== Climate ===
Carrollton has a humid subtropical climate (Köppen climate classification Cfa), with mild winters and hot, humid summers.

Severe winter conditions are infrequent. The record for snowfall is 10-11", which fell on December 8 and 9, 2017. The previous record for biggest snow was in March 1993 during the Blizzard of 1993 with 4 to 6 inches (100 to 150 mm) of snow. During the storm thundersnow was reported. On Christmas Day 2010 Carrollton had its first white Christmas in 17 years.

Thunderstorms, a few of them severe, can occur during the spring and summer months. The main risk from these storms comes from lightning strikes. Any tornadoes produced by these storms tend to be small and highly localized. An EF3 tornado hit an area about 10 miles (16 km) west of Carrollton on February 26, 2008. Some of the same areas hit by the February 2008 tornadoes were also hit by the Mother's Day tornadoes on May 11, 2008. The Mother's Day Tornadoes did extensive damage to many homes and businesses. In April 2017, a tornado hit Carrollton, destroying a fire station and damaging numerous homes and vehicles. The tornado also hit on the campus of the University of West Georgia.

Possibly the most significant severe weather risk comes from hurricanes that strike the Florida Panhandle. These storms track northward through Alabama as tropical storms, and some have brought high winds, heavy rainfall, and the occasional tornado to the Carrollton area, resulting in significant property damage. In October 1995 Hurricane Opal slammed the Florida panhandle then moved north into Alabama and then east into Georgia. The Carrollton area was hit with tropical storm force winds killing one person when a tree came down into a mobile home. Some area residents were without electricity for almost two weeks. In 2005 a feeder band from Hurricane Katrina produced a tornado that killed one person just south of Carrollton. Flooding is also a concern for the area. In September 2009, up to a foot of rain fell in some areas, flooding many homes, washing away roads and bridges, and claiming the lives of ten people in Georgia.

Climate data for Carrollton, Georgia (1991-2020 normals, extremes 1904–present)
Month	Jan	Feb	Mar	Apr	May	Jun	Jul	Aug	Sep	Oct	Nov	Dec	Year
Record high °F (°C)	81 (27)	81 (27)	93 (34)	92 (33)	97 (36)	102 (39)	103 (39)	102 (39)	100 (38)	97 (36)	86 (30)	81 (27)	103 (39)
Mean daily maximum °F (°C)	53.6 (12.0)	58.1 (14.5)	65.8 (18.8)	74.0 (23.3)	81.1 (27.3)	87.2 (30.7)	89.6 (32.0)	88.4 (31.3)	83.1 (28.4)	73.5 (23.1)	63.6 (17.6)	55.7 (13.2)	72.8 (22.7)
Mean daily minimum °F (°C)	31.6 (−0.2)	34.5 (1.4)	40.5 (4.7)	47.9 (8.8)	56.8 (13.8)	65.3 (18.5)	69.0 (20.6)	68.3 (20.2)	61.9 (16.6)	49.7 (9.8)	38.9 (3.8)	34.2 (1.2)	49.9 (9.9)
Record low °F (°C)	−9 (−23)	2 (−17)	8 (−13)	24 (−4)	30 (−1)	40 (4)	50 (10)	48 (9)	32 (0)	23 (−5)	2 (−17)	0 (−18)	−9 (−23)
Average rainfall inches (mm)	5.0 (130)	5.30 (135)	5.59 (142)	4.59 (117)	3.77 (96)	4.13 (105)	4.45 (113)	3.68 (93)	3.83 (97)	3.66 (93)	4.39 (112)	5.09 (129)	53.48 (1,362)
Average snowfall inches (cm)	0.2 (0.51)	0 (0)	0 (0)	0 (0)	0 (0)	0 (0)	0 (0)	0 (0)	0 (0)	0 (0)	0 (0)	0.4 (1.0)	0.6 (1.51)
Source: NOAA

== Demographics ==
Historical population
Census	Pop.	Note	%±
1880	926		—
1890	1,451		56.7%
1900	1,998		37.7%
1910	3,297		65.0%
1920	4,363		32.3%
1930	5,052		15.8%
1940	6,214		23.0%
1950	7,753		24.8%
1960	10,973		41.5%
1970	13,520		23.2%
1980	14,078		4.1%
1990	16,029		13.9%
2000	19,843		23.8%
2010	24,388		22.9%
2020	26,738		9.6%
2025 (est.)	27,925	▲	4.4%
U.S. Decennial Census; 2025

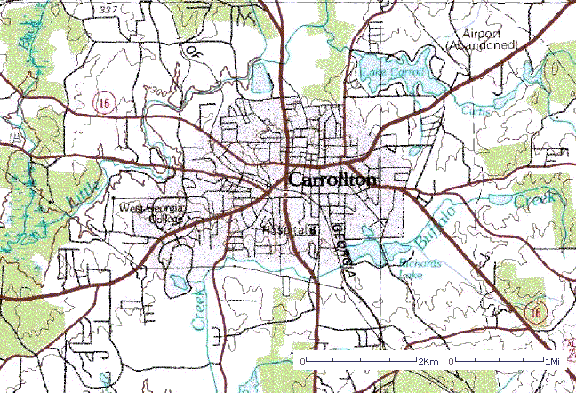
Topographic map of Carrollton

=== 2020 census ===
As of the 2020 census, Carrollton had a population of 26,738. The median age was 29.2 years; 21.0% of residents were under 18 and 13.0% were 65 or older. For every 100 females, there were 86.8 males, and for every 100 females 18 and over, there were 82.8 males 18 and over.

Of the 9,594 households in Carrollton, 30.4% had children under 18 living in them, 31.6% were married couples, 22.2% had a male householder and no spouse or partner present, and 40.0% had a female householder and no spouse or partner present. About 32.2% of all households were made up of individuals, and 12.7% had someone living alone who was 65 or older; 5,206 families were residing in the city.

Of the 10,466 housing units, 8.3% were vacant. The homeowner vacancy rate was 2.0% and the rental vacancy rate was 7.2%.

About 99.4% of residents lived in urban areas, while 0.6% lived in rural areas.

Racial composition as of the 2020 census
Race	Number	Percent
White	13,546	50.7%
Black or African American	8,545	32.0%
American Indian and Alaska Native	160	0.6%
Asian	453	1.7%
Native Hawaiian and other Pacific Islander	6	0.0%
Some other race	2,178	8.1%
Two or more races	1,850	6.9%
Hispanic or Latino (of any race)	3,829	14.3%

== Parks and recreation ==
Several parks are located in Carrollton such as Longview Park, Knox Park and Castle Playground. John Tanner Park, which is 6 miles (10 km) west of the city, has a lake with a beach and swimming area, walking or running track, and camp grounds.

The Carrollton Greenbelt is the largest paved loop in the state of Georgia. It is 18 miles long and is used for walking and bicycling. The trail goes all around Carrollton and has "trailheads" at Laura's Park at Hays Mill, Old-Newnan Road, Lakeshore Park, and more.

East Carrollton Park is located near Lake Carroll.

== Culture ==
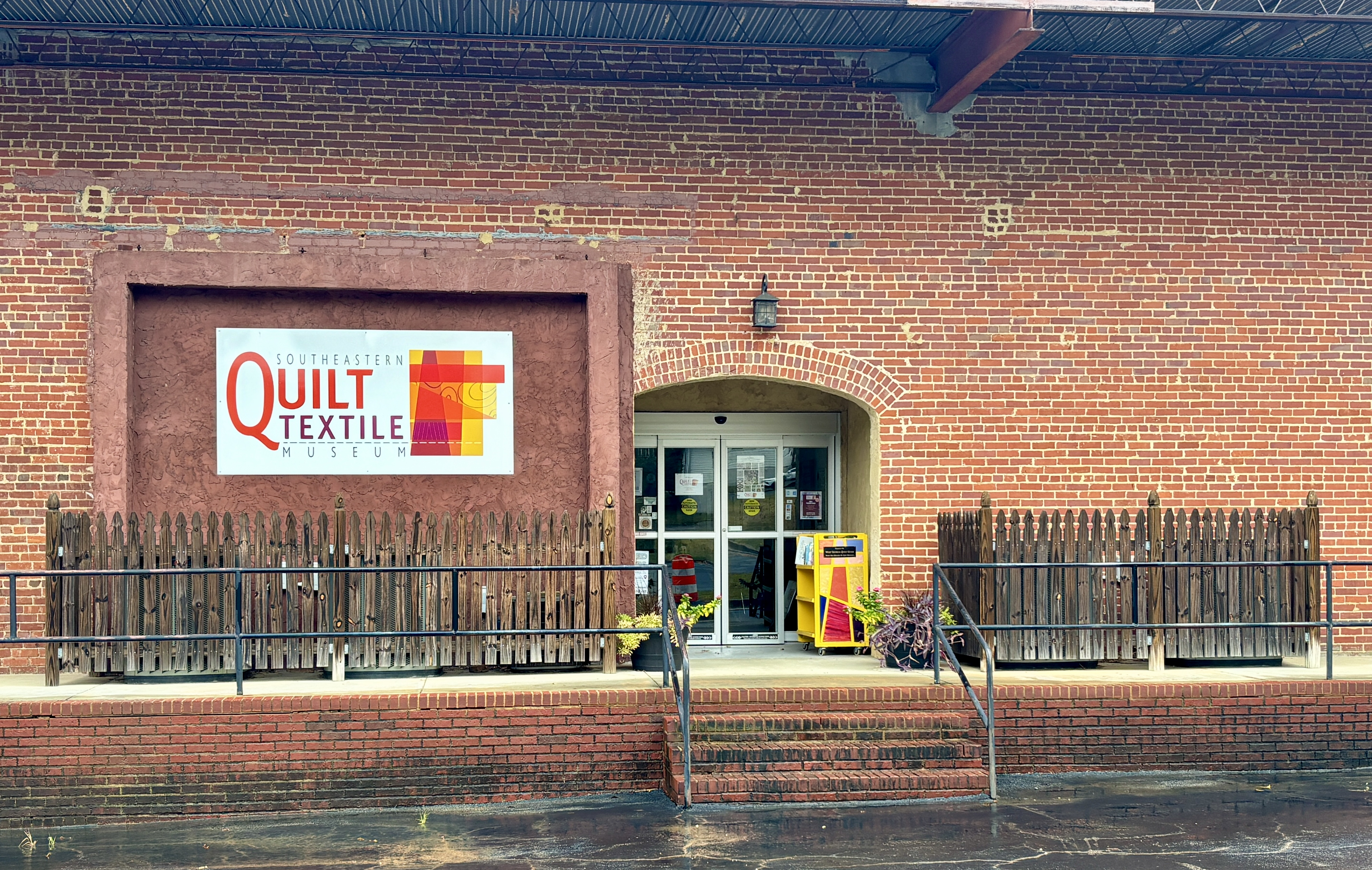
Southeastern Quilt & Textile Museum

Carrollton's downtown area is named Adamson Square after Congressman William C. Adamson. The area is the host to many of Carrollton's events, such as the annual Mayfest which takes place in the first week of May. Right off the Square is the Carrollton Center for the Arts, the site of Carrollton Festival of the Arts, an arts and crafts festival held in October.

In 2012 The AMP at Adamson Square debuted; this outdoor covered amphitheater can seat 800–1,000 people and shows a variety of free music and movie performances. Carrollton is well known for its diverse live music tradition. Many restaurants offer live music performances as well the Lowell Opry House where staged concerts are held.

One block south of the Square is the Southeastern Quilt & Textile Museum, which opened in September 2012. Exhibits have featured traditional and contemporary quilts by both solo artists and various regional guilds, and a partnership with the Center for Public History at the University of West Georgia has enabled the museum to exhibit highlights of the history of the local textile industry..

Carrollton has about 100 places of worship. The Sacred Harp Publishing Company, a non-profit organization supporting Sacred Harp singing, publishes the most widely used edition of the Sacred Harp songbook. Carrollton is the birthplace of Baptist pastor Jerry Vines. It is also the home of a small denomination: the National Association of Wesleyan Evangelicals.

The local company Gradick Communications own stations include B92.1 Country (WBTR), playing today's country hits; WKNG King Country 93.7 FM, offering a mix of traditional and contemporary country music; Great Classics 98.9 (WWGA), featuring oldies from the '70s through early 2000s; and Kiss 102.7 WCKS, a top adult contemporary station with a playlist spanning the 1980s to today; WLBB 1330 AM, which provides local news, talk, and community programming; and Rejoice 89.1 FM (WKNG FM), offering Contemporary Christian.

== Sports ==
=== Current sports franchises ===
- Georgia Storm FC - National Premier Soccer League - Formed in 2020 and competes in the Southeast Region of the NPSL. Home games are played at the University of West Georgia soccer field.

=== Defunct sports franchises ===
- Carrollton Hornets - Georgia–Alabama League - Minor league baseball team that competed from 1946 to 1950

=== Stadiums ===
- Grisham Stadium - Multi-purpose home stadium for Carrollton High School
- University Stadium - Home football stadium for the West Georgia Wolves

== Education ==
=== Carroll County School District ===
The Carroll County School District provides education from pre-school through grade twelve and consists of twelve elementary schools, six middle schools, and five high schools. Schools located in Carrollton include:

- Central High School
- Central Middle School
- Central Elementary School
- Mount Zion High School
- Mount Zion Elementary School
- Sand Hill Elementary School
- Sharp Creek Elementary School

=== Carrollton City School District ===
The Carrollton City School District serves grades pre-school through twelve and consists of one lower elementary school, an upper elementary school, a middle school, and a high school.

- Carrollton High School
- Carrollton Middle School
- Carrollton Upper Elementary School
- Carrollton Elementary School

=== Carver High School ===
George Washington Carver High School served as the only black high school in Carrollton during racial segregation in the South. The school was closed in 1969.

=== Higher education ===
- West Georgia Technical College - Carroll Campus
- University of West Georgia - Main Campus

=== Private schools ===
- The Bridge Learning Center
- Oak Mountain Academy
- Oak Grove Montessori School
- Liberty Eagle Academy

== Transportation ==
=== Major roads ===
- State Route 1
- State Route 16
- U.S. Route 27
- State Route 113
- State Route 166

=== Pedestrians and cycling ===
- Carrollton Greenbelt
- UWG Nature Trails

== Notable people ==
- William C. Adamson - politician, associate justice of the United States Customs Court and member of the Board of General Appraisers
- Margie Alexander - gospel and soul singer
- Terry Boyd - former CBA player
- Reggie Brown - former Philadelphia Eagles and University of Georgia wide receiver
- Bull Buchanan - current Rampage Pro Wrestling World Heavyweight Champion
- Mark Butler - politician
- Betty Reynolds Cobb - attorney, author, and activist
- Chaz Chambliss - Linebacker Minnesota Vikings and Georgia Bulldogs football
- Cooper Criswell - pitcher for the Boston Red Sox
- Corey Crowder - former NBA player
- Richard DeLong - Sacred Harp singer
- Patrick Gamble - former NFL and Georgia Tech defensive end
- Bill Hamrick - lawyer, politician, and judge
- Hollis L. Harris - former president and COO of Delta Air Lines and chairman, president, and CEO of Continental Airlines, Air Canada, and World Airways
- Josh Harris - NFL long snapper and Auburn University graduate
- Julian Hoke Harris - sculptor
- Susan Hayward - Academy Award-winning actress
- Jamie Henderson - former New York Jets and University of Georgia cornerback
- Neal Horsley - militant anti-abortion activist
- Michael Huey - professional drummer and record producer
- John Willis Hurst - personal cardiologist for Lyndon B. Johnson
- Keith Jackson - sports announcer for ABC-TV, particularly college football
- Jonathan Jones - football cornerback for the New England Patriots
- Nick Jones - former Seattle Seahawks center and current Los Angeles Rams coaching assistant
- Catherine Hardy Lavender - Olympic athlete and gold medalist
- Steve Moore - racing driver
- MJ Morris - quarterback for North Carolina State University, University of Maryland
- Dylan Parham - offensive guard for the Las Vegas Raiders
- Darnell Powell - former Buffalo Bills and New York Jets running back and UTC graduate
- Dontavius Russell - NFL defensive tackle and free agent
- Steve Thomas - NBA and former CBA player
- Kin Vassy - country singer and songwriter
- Don Wix - politician
- Amy Yates - murder victim for whom Amy's Law is named

== See also ==
- 1987 Carroll County cryptosporidiosis outbreak
