= Villa Rica, Georgia =

- City
- City Hall on Bankhead Highway

- Flag Seal
- Nickname: The City of Gold
- Location in Douglas County & Carroll County and the state of Georgia
- Coordinates: 33°43′55″N 84°55′12″W
- Country: United States
- State: Georgia
- Counties: Carroll, Douglas
- Hixtown: 1826
- Villa Rica: 1881
- Named for: Historic Gold Rush and Mines

Government
  - Type: Council Manager
  - Mayor: Leslie McPherson
  - City Manager: Tom Barber

Area
  - Total: 14.78 sq mi (38.28 km^{2})
  - Land: 14.64 sq mi (37.93 km^{2})
  - Water: 0.13 sq mi (0.34 km^{2})
- Elevation: 1,138 ft (347 m)

Population (2021)
  - Total: 16,970
  - Density: 1,158.7/sq mi (447.36/km^{2})
- Time zone: UTC-5 (EST)
  - Summer (DST): UTC-4 (EDT)
- ZIP code: 30180
- Area codes: 404/678/470/770
- FIPS code: 13-79528
- GNIS feature ID: 0333333
- Website: villarica.org

Villa Rica /ˌvɪlə ˈrɪkə/ (Spanish and Portuguese translation: Rich Village) is a city in Carroll and Douglas counties in the U.S. state of Georgia. Villa Rica is placed in the Atlanta metropolitan area. As of the 2020 census, Villa Rica had a population of 16,970.

Additionally, there are unincorporated areas in Paulding County with Villa Rica postal addresses.

== History ==
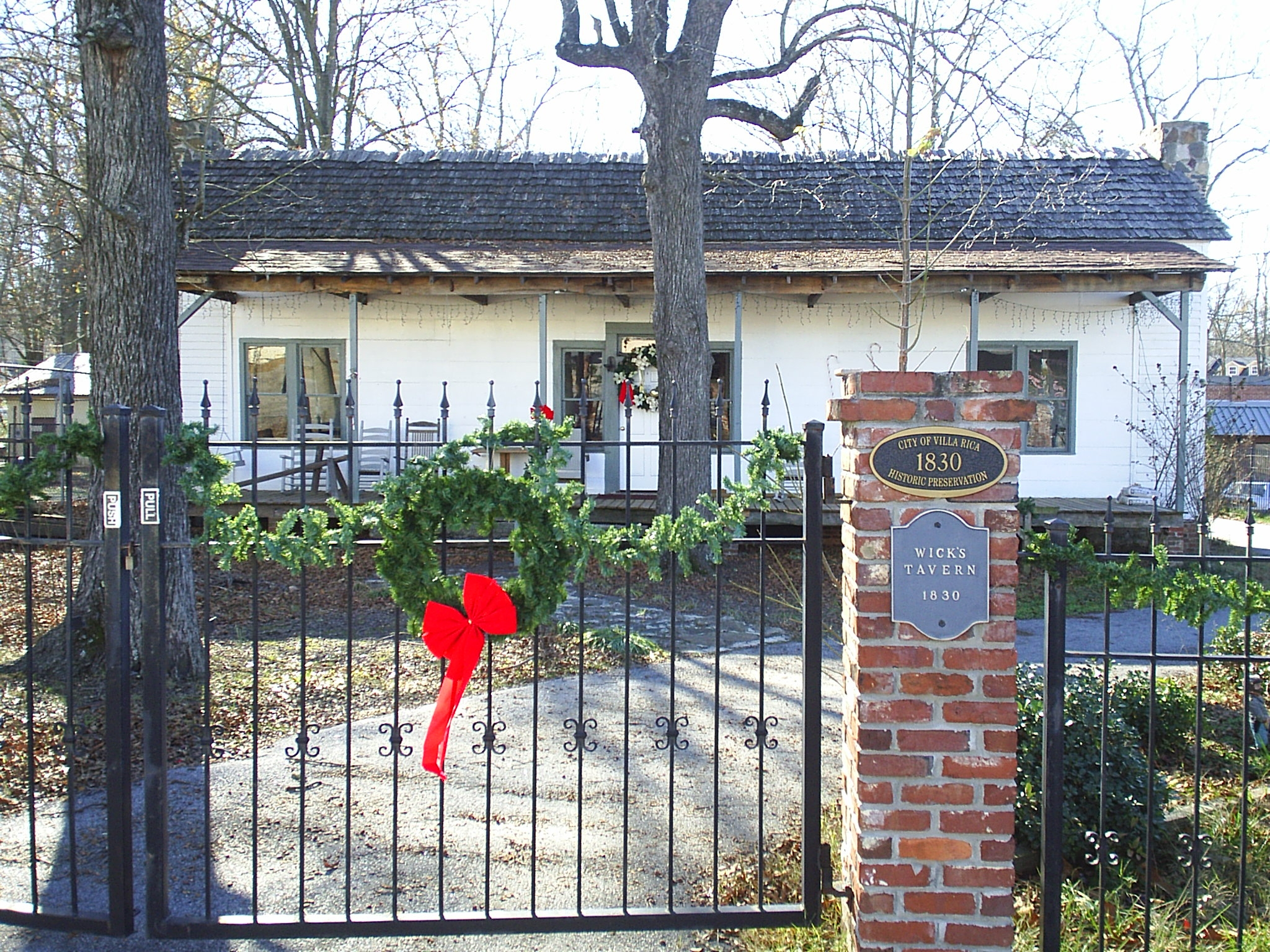
Still standing, Wicks Tavern was built in 1830 and was major competition for Hix Tavern.

The location which was to become Villa Rica was originally settled in 1826 along what is now Dallas Highway. This land was ceded by the Creek people in 1825 with the second Treaty of Indian Springs signed by Chief William McIntosh. In 1826, farmers and gold miners arrived in the area from Pennsylvania, New Jersey and Delaware to what was then known as "Hixtown" (named after a local tavern operator, incorporated in 1830). One mile south was Chevestown, owned by Allison Cheeves. Hixtown and Cheevestown moved to Villa Rica's present location in 1882 when the railroad was built. Many of the original structures were physically moved to the new site (now known as the North Villa Rica Commercial Historic District) by rolling them on logs pulled by horses. The city was incorporated as Villa Rica in 1881. The name Villa Rica is derived from the Spanish for "rich village", and the city's name change was done to help promote the gold that had been found in the area.

=== Old Villa Rica (Hixtown) ===
Shortly after the arrival of the wagons in 1826, gold was discovered there. 1826 was also the year that Carroll County was created and named for Charles Carroll of Carrollton, Maryland, because he was the last living signer of the Declaration of Independence. Although it did not develop into the large gold rush that would strike Georgia a few years later, there was a small gold rush in Villa Rica in the late 1820s. When the Georgia Gold Rush took hold in 1829, most of the Villa Rica miners moved northeast to the Dahlonega area. Villa Rica was established in 1830. Nevertheless, some mining continued in the area, with several hundred men employed in nearby mines. In 1832, Hixtown had over 2,000 residents (60% of the county's population). Gold lots were $500 per acre compared to $2 per acre for land elsewhere in the county. There were at least 19 active gold mines. By 1860, the gold supplies in the area had been largely exhausted.

Early Villa Rica had a Wild West atmosphere complete with Indians, horse thieves, and vigilante justice. The area was originally part of the Creek Nation, but the Indians were driven out of their lands after the Treaty of Washington in 1826 and by 1827, there were no more Creek in Georgia. Most moved west into Alabama, but there, too, they faced the avarice of white settlers, who sparked a brief war in 1836 that ended with the forcible removal of all of the Creek from Alabama to Oklahoma as well.

The local horse thieves were known as the Pony Club, and the vigilantes were the Slicks. At first, the Slicks would just hold Pony Club members caught stealing horses until a jury trial could be held. But Pony Club members usually had no trouble finding witnesses to prove their innocence, so the Slicks eventually started holding their own trials and the guilty were whipped. Things came to a head during the election of 1832 when large numbers of Pony Club members and Slicks got into a brawl. The Slicks won the fight, and the Pony Club demanded a grand jury try the Slicks on charges of assault and battery with intent to kill. However, the jury ended up commending the Slicks and thanking them for their work.

=== New Villa Rica ===
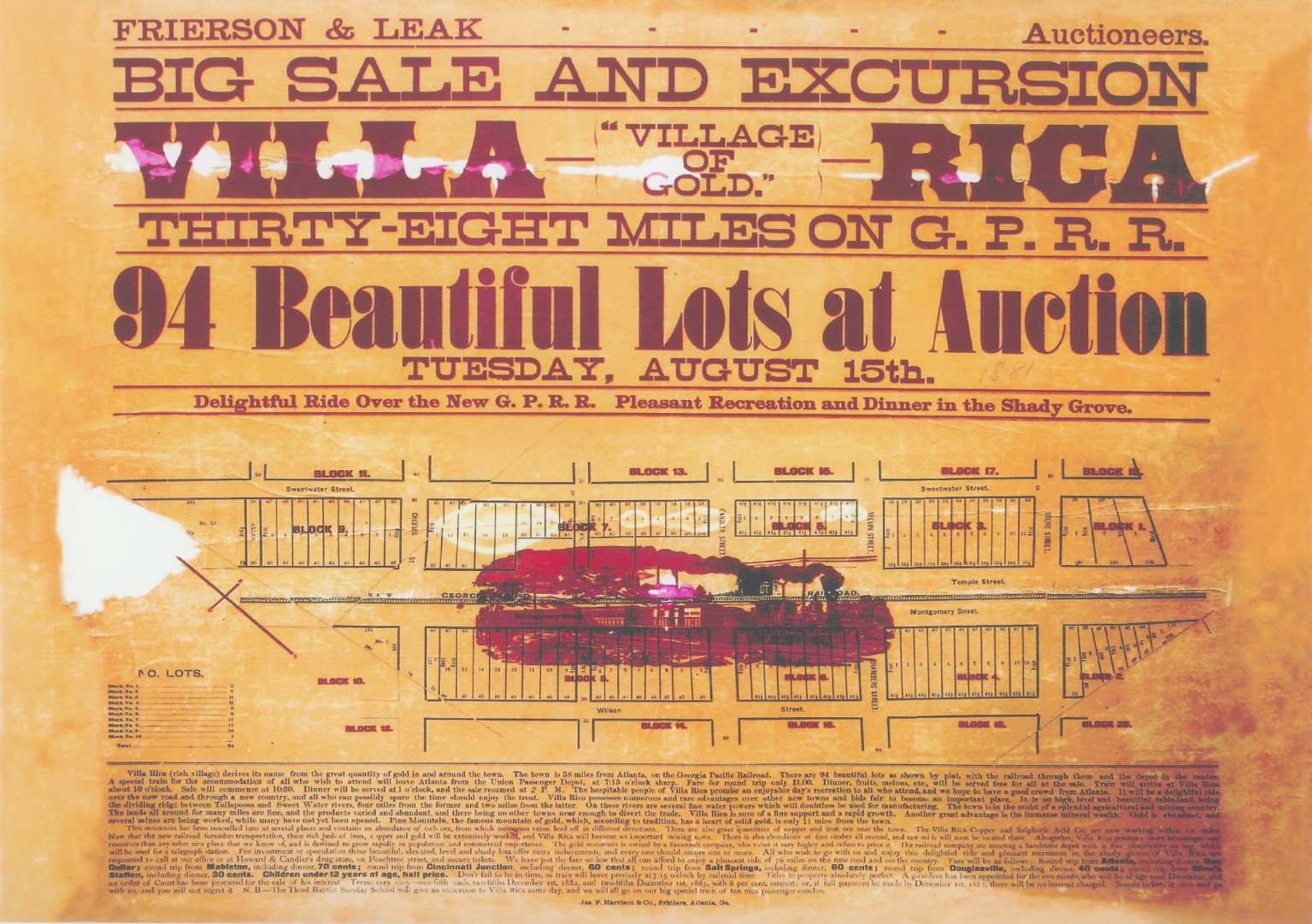
Handbill originally distributed to announce a land sale in Villa Rica, Georgia, c. 1882.

With the arrival of the new railroad line, Hixtown and Cheevestown combined to become the new city of Villa Rica. The first train rolled through town in June 1882. A round-trip ticket from the Union Passenger Depot in Atlanta was only $1.00.

This young community experienced two disastrous fires almost immediately. The first fire occurred in the business section on Montgomery Street in 1890. An entire block of stores composed entirely of wooden buildings was destroyed. The second fire occurred the night of July 27, 1908. The fire was bolstered by heating oil and chemicals from the drug store in which it started. Because of the strength of the fire, much of the focus was on saving the stock of the affected stores. In all, one-quarter of Villa Rica's business district was destroyed in three hours. In 1957 an explosion caused by a gas leak destroyed four buildings and killed 12 people.

The Bankhead Highway was surveyed and eventually passed through Villa Rica in 1917. Named for Democratic U.S. Senator (from 1907 until his death in 1920) John H. Bankhead, it was the second transcontinental highway in the United States and the first all-weather one. In the 1930s it was rerouted through town, taking down the Velvin Hotel and extending Montgomery Street westward. It was a main east–west route through the area until Interstate 20 opened in December 1977.

On May 14, 1961, Freedom Riders passed through Villa Rica.

=== Historic sites ===
- Wicks Tavern (c. 1830) is the oldest commercial structure in Carroll County. The tavern was built in Hixtown by New York immigrant John B. Wick. Wick's Tavern was a local gathering place for gold miners working area mines in the early 19th century. The building is a classic example of the "Dutch"-style timber framing method. When the Georgia Pacific Railway passed through town in 1882 and the homes and businesses were moved, the tavern was considered too large to be moved. It was later turned into a home. In 1998, the "Friends of Wick's Tavern" raised the funds necessary to rescue this historic building from being demolished and finally helped it make the journey to downtown Villa Rica. Wicks Tavern now serves as a living history museum and the home of Forrest Escort SCV and the Friends of Wicks Tavern.
- The Stockmar Gold Mine (19th–20th centuries) is presently being preserved as a city park and gold museum currently under the name Pine Mountain Gold Museum at Stockmar Park. As a division of Villa Rica Parks and Recreation, the museum was opened in 2008 and serves as a historical landmark for the city.
- Fullerville (1916–1956) is a small community northwest of Villa Rica which had several textile mills (notably hosiery). Fullerville was granted a charter in 1916 but returned it to the state in 1956, allowing the city to be annexed into Villa Rica. The area retains its early 20th-century character. Its most notable feature is the Fullerville Jail which dates to 1828 on county property records.
- Mt. Prospect Baptist Church was officially formed in July 1887. The first church building was erected in 1888–1890 on Beecher Hill (now Wilson Street) and was dedicated on the second Sunday in May 1892. This was the building in which Thomas A. Dorsey learned about music. The second church building, built in 1928, was the first black-owned church building in Carroll County. This building was destroyed by fire in February 1945. A new church building was immediately commissioned and completed in five months. In 2005, work began on a larger sanctuary next to the existing one, and the congregation moved into the new church March 11, 2007.

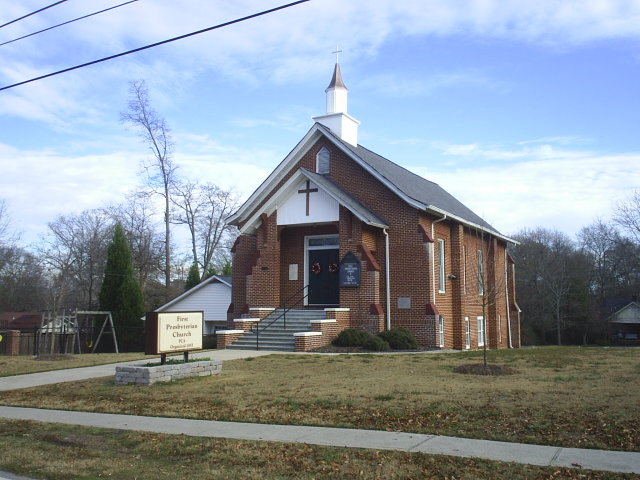
Villa Rica First Presbyterian Church

- The First Presbyterian Church of Villa Rica was organized as Villa Rica Presbyterian Church in 1855. A white frame building was constructed on Candler Street in 1885 for worship. The building was moved to its current location in 1930 onto property donated by the family of Mr. W. B. Candler who had served as Clerk of Session from 1888 to 1921. The structure was bricked and a basement was added for Sunday School rooms. The mahogany pews, pulpit, and the stained glass windows were purchased from Old Wesley Memorial Church in Atlanta when it was torn down. The windows were made from a color formula that has been lost over time, making them irreplaceable antiques. The Candler home, situated behind the church building, served the church in many capacities before it was torn down in 1998 and replaced with a new fellowship building.
- First United Methodist Church of Villa Rica: Although historical documentation is sketchy, it is believed that the Methodist Church built their first building, a log cabin, in 1830, making them the first church in the city. Around 1845, a wooden church building was built. When Hixtown moved and Villa Rica was created, the church elected to build a new white frame church. It was constructed in 1886 on the current church site. The old church was abandoned in 1890. The construction on the current church began in 1905 and was first used in July 1906.

==== National Register of Historic Places ====
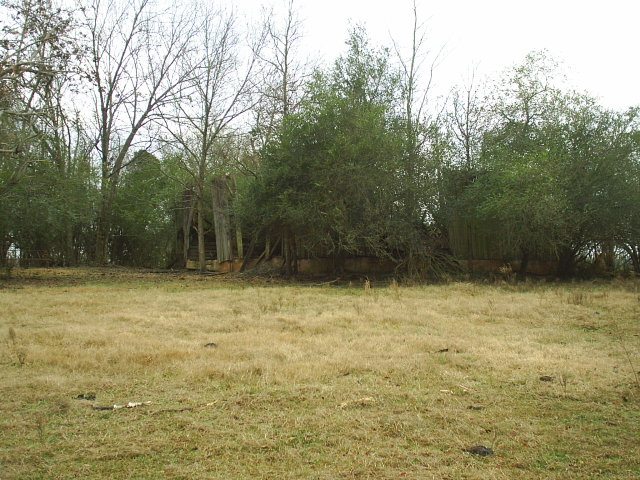
A photo of the nationally registered historic round barn in Villa Rica, showing its state of disrepair

The Dorough Round Barn and Farm was added to the National Register of Historic Places on January 20, 1980. Located about 3 miles (5 km) southwest of Villa Rica on Hickory Level Road, the farm consists of a 19th-century farmhouse, several other outbuildings, and the famous round barn. Built in 1917, the Round Barn is quite significant architecturally due to its circular shape. When constructed, this would have been considered a progressive agricultural building technique. The barn was designed by Floyd Lovell. It had two levels, the upper one smaller than the lower. At the time the barn was added, it was still generally structurally intact. The upper level is now completely gone, and the lower level is falling apart as well. The barn is privately owned, and it is unknown whether there are any plans to restore it.

The North Villa Rica Commercial Historic District was added to the National Register of Historic Places on December 31, 2002. This district includes several blocks of buildings, some dating back to 1875, which were built in the early commercial style. The area houses the City of Villa Rica Police Department along with several antique stores, restaurants, and other commercial businesses. The boundary is basically North Avenue, East Gordon Street, West Church Street, and the Southern Railroad line.

The Williams Family Farm was added to the National Register of Historic Places on March 25, 2005. The farm-house, built in 1892, is in excellent condition and sits in front of a Civilian Conservation Corps camp established in 1937 to help struggling farmers with their cotton fields. There are several outbuildings and an historic landscape. This farm is also known as the Williams-Mitchell Farm.

The Pine Mountain Gold Museum at Stockmar Park was added to the National Register of Historic Places in 2008. The 1826 gold rush of the city, called "Georgia's Forgotten Gold Rush", was at Stockmar Park, and a museum was built to tell the story. The remains of some original buildings and equipment are on site, along with a stamp mill, grist mill, panning area, and live farm animal exhibit.

The South Commercial Historic District is eligible for the National Register of Historic Places, but the completed nomination form is currently held up because of the controversy over the Old Library/Old Clinic for the past several years. The building is one of the most significant in West Georgia and a keystone of the proposed historic district.

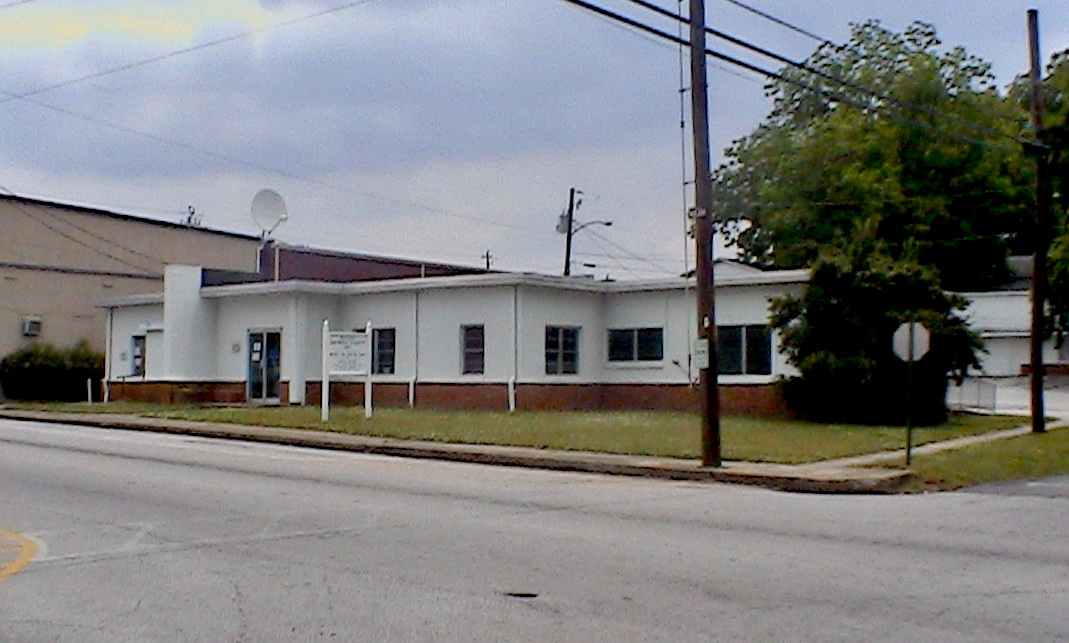
Old Villa Rica Library 1951-2007

The city and the Downtown Development Authority desired to tear down the oldest International design Old Clinic. Built as the Berry-Powell-Berry Clinic, the doctors chose cutting-edge architecture to showcase their practice as cutting edge. Built in 1951, the building later served as the Old Library and then again as a clinic. After several years of efforts to save the structure, the city tore it down in December 2007. Previously insisting for years on the need for parking, immediately after demolition the site was made into a parking lot for local businesses. The city also allowed Tanner Medical Center to demolish the old hospital (1955) which was built with the same architecture and used by the same collation of doctors.

==== Historical markers ====
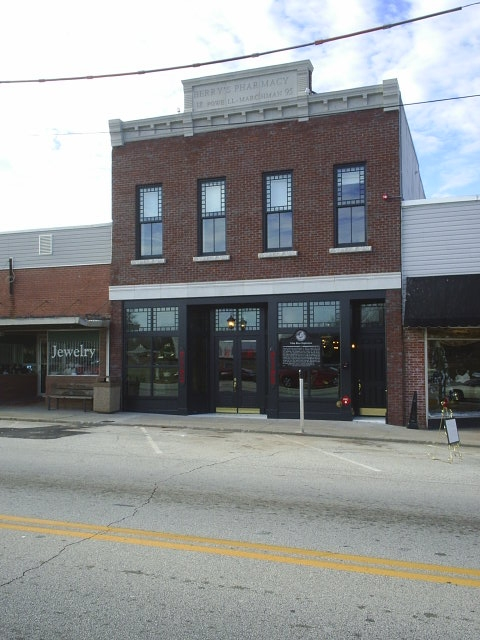
Berry's Pharmacy with historical marker out front

Villa Rica currently has four historical markers. The first one was erected in 1994 marking the birthplace of Thomas A. Dorsey, the father of gospel songs. Dorsey learned about music as a child at Mt. Prospect Baptist Church. After leaving Villa Rica, Dorsey became a famous blues musician known as Georgia Tom. After the death of his first wife and son, he returned to religious music, but the influence of the blues resulted in the creation of a new style of music which was eventually referred to as gospel.

The second historical marker was erected in 2003 with information about the grove, the ancestral home of the Tyson family. Having moved here in 1853, the Tysons are among the oldest families in Villa Rica.

The third historical marker was erected in 2007 on the 50th anniversary of the Villa Rica Explosion. The explosion was caused by a gas leak in Berry's Pharmacy which completely destroyed that building and three neighboring buildings. Twelve people died and twenty others were injured. In terms of injury and loss of life, the explosion remains the most catastrophic event in Carroll County history.

The fourth was erected 2011 by Villa Rica Historic Preservation Commission. While the resolve of the freedom riders was challenged by violence elsewhere, they passed through Villa Rica without serious incident on May 14, 1961.

==== September 2009 flooding ====
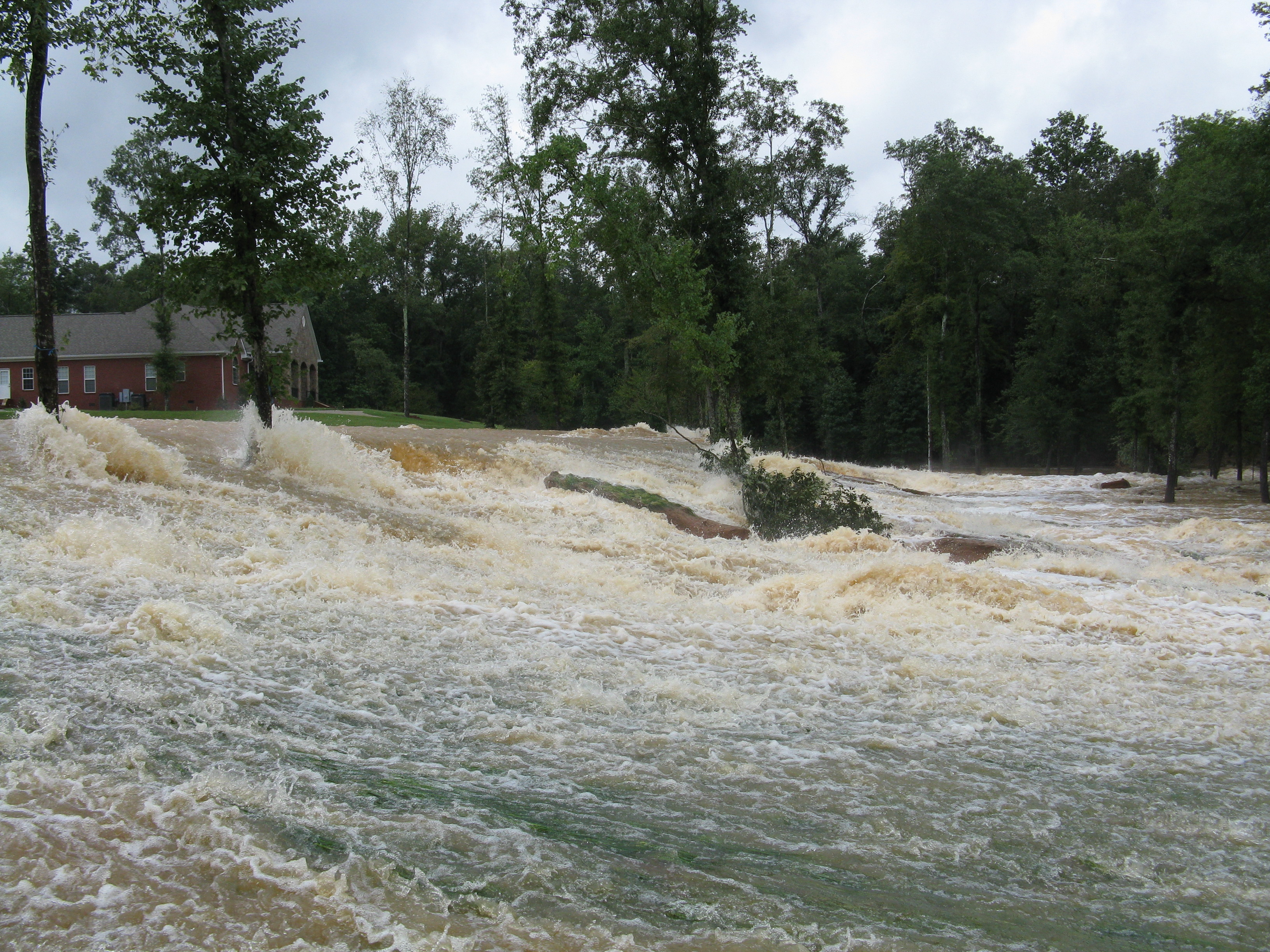
A rush of water carries away a tree and other debris in Carroll County.

On September 21, 2009, the biggest flood in Georgia's history impacted Villa Rica. It caused nearly 500 million dollars in damage to the state. This event caused damage to water lines and infrastructure, causing many of the residents to go without water for nearly a week.

== Geography ==
Villa Rica is located in northeastern Carroll County, northwestern Douglas County and Unincorporated Paulding County at 33°43′55″N 84°55′12″W (33.731909, -84.919982). U.S. Route 78 (Bankhead Highway) passes through the center of the city, leading west 6 miles (10 km) to Temple and east 10 miles (16 km) to Douglasville. Interstate 20 passes through the southern part of the city with access from exits 24 and 26, and leads east 32 miles (51 km) to Atlanta and west 55 miles (89 km) to Oxford, Alabama.

According to the United States Census Bureau, the city has a total area of 14.4 square miles (37.3 km^{2}), of which 14.2 square miles (36.9 km^{2}) is land and 0.15 square miles (0.4 km^{2}), or 1.04%, is water. Villa Rica sits on the ridgeline that separates the Chattahoochee and the Tallapoosa river basins. Slightly more than half of Villa Rica lies within Carroll County, and the remainder lies within Douglas County.

=== Climate ===
Villa Rica has a humid subtropical climate (Cfa) according to the Köppen classification system, with hot, humid summers and mild to chilly winters. On average, the warmest month is July. The highest recorded temperature was 103 °F (39 °C) in 1980. On average, the coolest month is January. The lowest recorded temperature was −9 °F (−23 °C) in 1985. The most precipitation on average occurs in March. Despite its significant physical distance from the Gulf of Mexico (250 miles) and the Atlantic Ocean (260 miles), on rare occasion Villa Rica is impacted by hurricanes, sometimes severely. Tornadoes are a more common occurrence in the area, although not usually as severe as those that occur in the midwest United States.

Climate data for Villa Rica, Georgia
Month	Jan	Feb	Mar	Apr	May	Jun	Jul	Aug	Sep	Oct	Nov	Dec	Year
Record high °F (°C)	81 (27)	80 (27)	93 (34)	92 (33)	96 (36)	100 (38)	103 (39)	102 (39)	100 (38)	97 (36)	86 (30)	81 (27)	103 (39)
Mean daily maximum °F (°C)	52 (11)	57 (14)	65 (18)	72 (22)	79 (26)	85 (29)	88 (31)	87 (31)	82 (28)	73 (23)	64 (18)	55 (13)	72 (22)
Mean daily minimum °F (°C)	29 (−2)	31 (−1)	38 (3)	44 (7)	53 (12)	61 (16)	66 (19)	65 (18)	59 (15)	46 (8)	38 (3)	31 (−1)	47 (8)
Record low °F (°C)	−9 (−23)	3 (−16)	9 (−13)	24 (−4)	30 (−1)	36 (2)	47 (8)	48 (9)	32 (0)	23 (−5)	2 (−17)	0 (−18)	−9 (−23)
Average rainfall inches (mm)	5.53 (140)	5.07 (129)	6.22 (158)	4.38 (111)	4.16 (106)	3.86 (98)	4.53 (115)	3.70 (94)	3.21 (82)	3.36 (85)	4.55 (116)	4.44 (113)	53.01 (1,347)
Source: The Weather Channel

== Demographics ==
Historical population
Census	Pop.	Note	%±
1880	212		—
1890	426		100.9%
1900	576		35.2%
1910	855		48.4%
1920	1,047		22.5%
1930	1,304		24.5%
1940	1,522		16.7%
1950	1,703		11.9%
1960	3,450		102.6%
1970	3,922		13.7%
1980	3,420		−12.8%
1990	6,542		91.3%
2000	4,134		−36.8%
2010	13,956		237.6%
2020	16,970		21.6%
2025 (est.)	21,022	▲	23.9%
U.S. Decennial Census; 1850-1870 1870-1880; 1890-1910 1920-1930; 1940 1950 1960; 1970 1980 1990; 2000 2010 2020; 2025

=== Racial and ethnic composition ===
Villa Rica city, Georgia – Racial and ethnic composition Note: the US Census treats Hispanic/Latino as an ethnic category. This table excludes Latinos from the racial categories and assigns them to a separate category. Hispanics/Latinos may be of any race.
Race / Ethnicity (NH = Non-Hispanic)	Pop 2000	Pop 2010	Pop 2020	% 2000	% 2010	% 2020
White alone (NH)	3,230	7,641	7,413	78.13%	54.75%	43.68%
Black or African American alone (NH)	739	4,598	6,753	17.88%	32.95%	39.79%
Native American or Alaska Native alone (NH)	33	36	30	0.80%	0.26%	0.18%
Asian alone (NH)	11	239	467	0.27%	1.71%	2.75%
Native Hawaiian or Pacific Islander alone (NH)	1	3	2	0.02%	0.02%	0.01%
Other race alone (NH)	4	57	154	0.10%	0.41%	0.91%
Mixed race or Multiracial (NH)	26	318	819	0.63%	2.28%	4.83%
Hispanic or Latino (any race)	90	1,064	1,332	2.18%	7.62%	7.85%
Total	4,134	13,956	16,970	100.00%	100.00%	100.00%

=== 2020 census ===
As of the 2020 census, Villa Rica had a population of 16,970, with 6,101 households and 3,766 families.

The median age was 34.8 years. 27.3% of residents were under the age of 18 and 11.9% of residents were 65 years of age or older. For every 100 females there were 86.0 males, and for every 100 females age 18 and over there were 81.8 males age 18 and over.

98.2% of residents lived in urban areas, while 1.8% lived in rural areas.

Of the city's 6,101 households, 41.8% had children under the age of 18 living in them. Of all households, 45.7% were married-couple households, 15.9% were households with a male householder and no spouse or partner present, and 31.7% were households with a female householder and no spouse or partner present. About 23.6% of all households were made up of individuals and 9.2% had someone living alone who was 65 years of age or older.

There were 6,476 housing units, of which 5.8% were vacant. The homeowner vacancy rate was 1.7% and the rental vacancy rate was 5.1%.

As of 2020 of the Villa Rica residents, 8,367 lived in Carroll County and 5,589 lived in Douglas County.

== Arts, entertainment, festivals ==
- Thomas A. Dorsey Festival, closest Saturday to July 1, features gospel music and blues
- Gold Rush Festival, Saturday after Labor Day
- Homecoming Parade/Pep Rally
- The movie Randy and the Mob was filmed mostly in Villa Rica in August 2005.
- Taste of VR
- Golden City Car Cruisers - Cruise In
- The MILL Amphitheater
- V-PLEX Fireworks Show

== Education ==
Areas in Carroll County are in the Carroll County School District, while areas in Douglas County are in the Douglas County School District.

=== Carroll County School District ===
The Carroll County School District provides education from pre-school through grade twelve and consists of twelve elementary schools, six middle schools, and five high schools. As of 2019–20, the district has 945 full-time teachers and 15,005 students. Schools located in Villa Rica include:

- Villa Rica High School
- Villa Rica Middle School
- Bay Springs Middle School
- Glanton-Hindsman Elementary School
- Ithica Elementary School
- Villa Rica Elementary School
- Sand Hill Elementary School

=== Other public schools ===
The Douglas County School District operates an elementary school located in Villa Rica.

- Mirror Lake Elementary School (Douglas County)

New Georgia Elementary School is operated by the Paulding County School District in Paulding County.

=== Private schools ===
- Sunbrook Academy at Bay Springs
- Mirror Lake Academy

== Transportation ==
=== Major roads ===
- Interstate 20
- U.S. Route 78
- State Route 8
- State Route 61
- State Route 101

=== Pedestrians and cycling ===
- Gold Nugget Trail (Proposed)
- The Goldway Network

=== Railroads ===
Historically, the Southern Railway ran several daily passenger trains, including the Kansas City-Florida Special, the Sunnyland and an Atlanta-Birmingham section of the Piedmont Limited, making flag or signal stops in Villa Rica. The last trains made stops in 1967.

== Notable people ==
- Asa Griggs Candler, Coca-Cola business executive and mayor of Atlanta
- Warren Akin Candler, bishop of the Methodist Episcopal Church, South, and tenth president of Emory University
- James A. "J." Collins - Funeral director and politician from Georgia. Former mayor of Villa Rica and member of Georgia House of Representatives from District 68.
- Jae Crowder, professional basketball player for the Milwaukee Bucks
- Thomas A. Dorsey, early innovator of black gospel music
- Maidie Norman, actress
- David M. Parsons, poet laureate of Texas, 2011
- Rufus B. Nalley, pioneering US college football player
- Rod Man - standup comedian, winner of Last Comic Standing
- Morgan Saylor, actress
- Dixie Walker, professional baseball player
- Herman "Thunderfoot" Weaver, professional football player
- Audrey Middleton, first openly transgender contestant on the U.S. version TV Series, Big Brother
