= Carroll County School District (Georgia) =

School district in Georgia, United States

Carroll County School System

Address
- 164 Independence Drive Carrollton, Georgia, 30116-7506; United States
- Coordinates: 33.569802°N 85.043820°W

District information
- Grades: Pre-kindergarten – 12
- Superintendent: Scott Cowart
- Accreditations: Southern Association of Colleges and Schools; Georgia Accrediting Commission
- NCES District ID: 1300840

Students and staff
- Enrollment: 15,981 (2022–23)
- Faculty: 1,023.90 (FTE)
- Staff: 930.60 (FTE)
- Student–teacher ratio: 15.61

Other information
- Telephone: (770) 832-3568
- Website: carrollcountyschools.com

The Carroll County School System is a public school district in Carroll County, Georgia, United States, based in Carrollton.

It includes portions of Carroll County not within the city limits of Carrollton, nor those of Bremen. It serves the communities of Bowdon, two thirds of unincorporated Bremen, Mount Zion, Roopville, Temple, Villa Rica, and Whitesburg.

== History ==
=== Drug testing ===
In 2015 the district announced that it will begin randomly drug test students at its high schools; students may be drug tested if they participate in extracurricular programs, including athletic and non-athletic ones, and persons who drive automobiles to school.

== Controversies ==
=== Superintendent hiring practices controversy ===
In 2022, the school board voted to renew the contract of superintendent Scott Cowart, however, this vote was divided with three of the seven board members voting against, citing a lack of diversity and equity in hiring practices by Cowart and his failure to give due notice to the board of his intention to renew his contract. Cowart has served as superintendent since 2010.

=== Unreserved fund balance ===
A candidate for the school board accused the district of maintaining an unreserved fund balance in excess beyond standards set by state law. Candidate Bill Kecskes claimed from personal research that the board maintained a $46,107,371 UFB: 31.28% of the 2022 fiscal year operating budget of $147,405,087. Kecskes also referred to OCGA 20-2-167(a)5 which sets target unreserved fund balances for school boards at "not less than 12-14% of annual operating expenditures for the subsequent fiscal year budget, not to exceed 15% of the total budget of the subsequent school year". The superintendent denied the claims made by Kecskes and stated the numbers were only targets as opposed to legal mandates.

== Schools ==
The Carroll County School District has twelve elementary schools, six middle schools, and five high schools.

=== Elementary schools ===
- Bowdon Elementary School
- Central Elementary School
- Glanton-Hindsman Elementary School
- Ithica Elementary School
- Mount Zion Elementary School
- Providence Elementary School
- Roopville Elementary School
- Sand Hill Elementary School
- Sharp Creek Elementary School
- Temple Elementary School
- Villa Rica Elementary School
- Whitesburg Elementary School

=== Middle schools ===
- Bay Springs Middle School
- Bowdon Middle School
- Central Middle School
- Mount Zion Middle School
- Temple Middle School
- Villa Rica Middle School

=== High schools ===
- Bowdon High School
- Central High School
- Mount Zion High School
- Temple High School
- Villa Rica High School

== Performing Arts Center ==
The Carroll County Schools Performing Arts Center was opened in 2017 to accommodate various needs of the school district. Designed as a music hall, the school system claims the venue as "the most acoustically calibrated facility in the western portion of Georgia". The auditorium can seat up to 1,100 people and hosts multiple side rooms for district staff meetings and exhibitions.

== See also ==
- Carrollton City School District
