= Darnell Powell =

American football player (born 1954)

No. 35, 20
- Position: Running back

Personal information
- Born: May 31, 1954 (age 72); Atlanta Georgia, U.S.
- Listed height: 6 ft 0 in (1.83 m)
- Listed weight: 197 lb (89 kg)

Career information
- High school: Carrollton (GA)
- College: Chattanooga
- NFL draft: 1976: 6th round, 175th overall pick

Career history
- Buffalo Bills (1976); Montreal Alouettes (1977); New York Jets (1978–1979)

Career NFL statistics
- Rushing attempts: 31
- Rushing yards: 117
- Rushing TDs: 1
- Stats at Pro Football Reference

Darnell Powell (born May 31, 1954) is an American former professional football player who was a running back in the National Football League (NFL). After playing college football for the Chattanooga Mocs, he played in the NFL for the Buffalo Bills in 1976 and for the New York Jets in 1978.
