= Patrick Gamble (American football) =

American football player (born 1994)

Profile
- Position: Defensive end

Personal information
- Born: February 2, 1994 (age 32); Carrollton, Georgia
- Listed height: 6 ft 5 in (1.96 m)
- Listed weight: 277 lb (126 kg)

Career information
- High school: Central (Carrollton, GA)
- College: Georgia Tech
- NFL draft: 2017: undrafted

Career history
- New York Jets (2017)*; Tampa Bay Buccaneers (2017)*
- * Offseason or practice squad member only

Patrick Gamble (born February 2, 1994) is an American former football defensive end. He played college football at Georgia Tech.

== Professional career ==
=== New York Jets ===
Gamble signed with the New York Jets as an undrafted free agent on May 5, 2017. He was waived by the Jets on September 2, 2017. He was re-signed to the practice squad on September 4, but released the next day.

=== Tampa Bay Buccaneers ===
On November 8, 2017, Gamble was signed to the Tampa Bay Buccaneers' practice squad. He was released on November 14, but was re-signed on November 29, 2017.
