= Carrollton High School (Carrollton, Georgia) =

Public high school in Carrollton, Georgia, United States

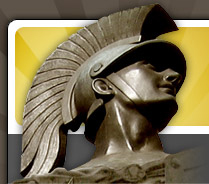

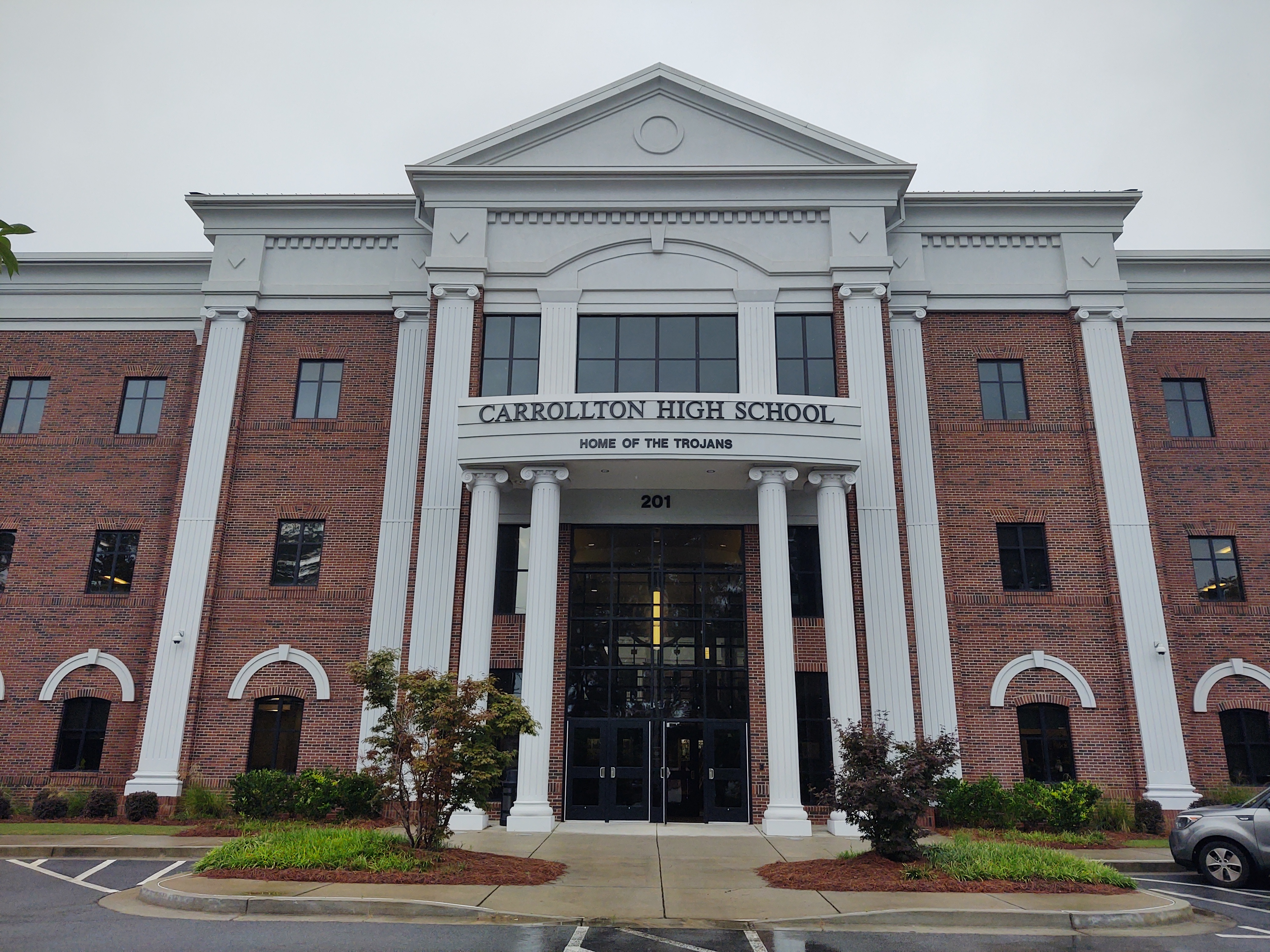

Location
- 201 Trojan Drive; Carrollton, Georgia 30117; United States; 33°33′59″N 85°04′52″W

Information
- School type: Public high school
- Motto: "The Gold Standard"
- Established: 1886
- School district: Carrollton City Schools
- CEEB code: 110603
- Principal: Eric Simmons
- Teaching staff: 104.90 (FTE)
- Grades: 9-12
- Enrollment: 1,825 (2023-2024)
- Average class size: 30
- Student to teacher ratio: 17.40
- Classes offered: Advanced Placement; International Baccalaureate
- Schedule type: 4x4 block
- Colors: Black and Gold
- Slogan: "Where Tradition Never Graduates"
- Fight song: Washington and Lee Swing
- Athletics: Basketball, baseball, cheerleading, cross country, dance, football, golf, gymnastics, lacrosse, marching band, riflery, soccer, softball, swimming, tennis, track & field, volleyball, wrestling
- Athletics conference: Georgia High School Association
- Mascot: Hector the Mighty Trojan
- Nickname: Trojans
- Yearbook: Arrowhead
- Website: chs.carrolltoncityschools.net

Carrollton High School is a public high school in Carrollton, Georgia, United States, part of the Carrollton City School System. The school's mascot is the Trojan.

== History ==
=== Early years ===
In 1886, a public school was established on College Street on the site of two former private schools, the "Carrollton Masonic Institute" and "Carrollton Seminary". Dr. William Washington Fitts, a local physician, civic leader, and owner of the school property, donated the land in order to establish the new public school system and served as president of its commissioning board. The new school, utilizing the wooden building of the old Masonic Institute, opened its doors in 1887 and served children in the local Carrollton area. The school was reconstructed as a larger two-story brick building ten years later and reopened as the Carrollton Public School, or College Street School. The first floor of this new building was divided into separate girls' and boys' high schools, with younger grades attending classes on the second floor. The high schools became a consolidated co-ed Carrollton High School in 1912. (Note: The original 1887 school becomes retroactively referred to as Carrollton High.) A separate feeder school, the "Maple Street School", was constructed on the namesake street in 1913, and children from the nearby "West View School" in Mandeville Mills were allowed to attend in 1922. Over a year earlier, the school district constructed another building on South White Street with a colonial revival design by architect Neel Reid, and the building became the new Carrollton High School in 1921. Both the Maple and College Street schools served as feeders into the separate high school. The original College Street building was later dismantled in 1954 with an "annex" extension, having been added some years earlier, surviving the razing therefore taking its name.

=== Segregation ===
While white children were allowed to attend the Carrollton Public School and later the Maple Street and Carrollton High School, school racial segregation was still in existence and African American students were denied admittance into these schools.

With the construction of the Maple Street School in 1913, another school for African American children was built on Pearl Street. However, the name of this original school is unknown. (Note: Retroactively referred to as "Pearl Street School".) In 1932, using funds raised from a bond issue by the city of Carrollton, along with matching funds from the Rosenwald Fund, the Carroll County Training School was established on the corner of Alabama and King Streets. In 1954, a new building was built for grades 8-12 and was named George Washington Carver High School while the adjacent Carroll County Training School, becoming a feeder elementary school, was renamed "Alabama Street Elementary".

=== Current location ===
A new Carrollton High School was built at the southern end of Oak Avenue from 1962 to 1963, and students from the Neel Reid building were moved to this new location as it became the junior high school for the district. A Carrollton High student would later petition the local city council to rename the stretch of road in front of the school, and it became "Trojan Drive" in 1966. School integration was later organized from 1965 to 1969 (Note: Integration did not become widespread in rural Georgia until over ten years after the original ruling of Brown v. Board of Education.), and students from the now closed Carver High attended Carrollton along with surrounding county schools. The school district underwent major reorganization with integration, and established a single cluster system utilizing the formerly segregated school facilities. A new junior high school was built in 1986 next to the high school while the historic Neel Reid building was sold to the community; now known as the "Tracy Stallings Community Center". The College Street School annex facility was also sold to the community and is now the Carroll County Administration Building. However, as of 2022, the annex is planned to be torn down in favor of a new administration building. The current elementary and middle schools were opened in 1992 and 2005 respectively next to the junior high (now upper elementary) and high school establishing the entire system on a unified 130-acre campus.

=== School replacement ===
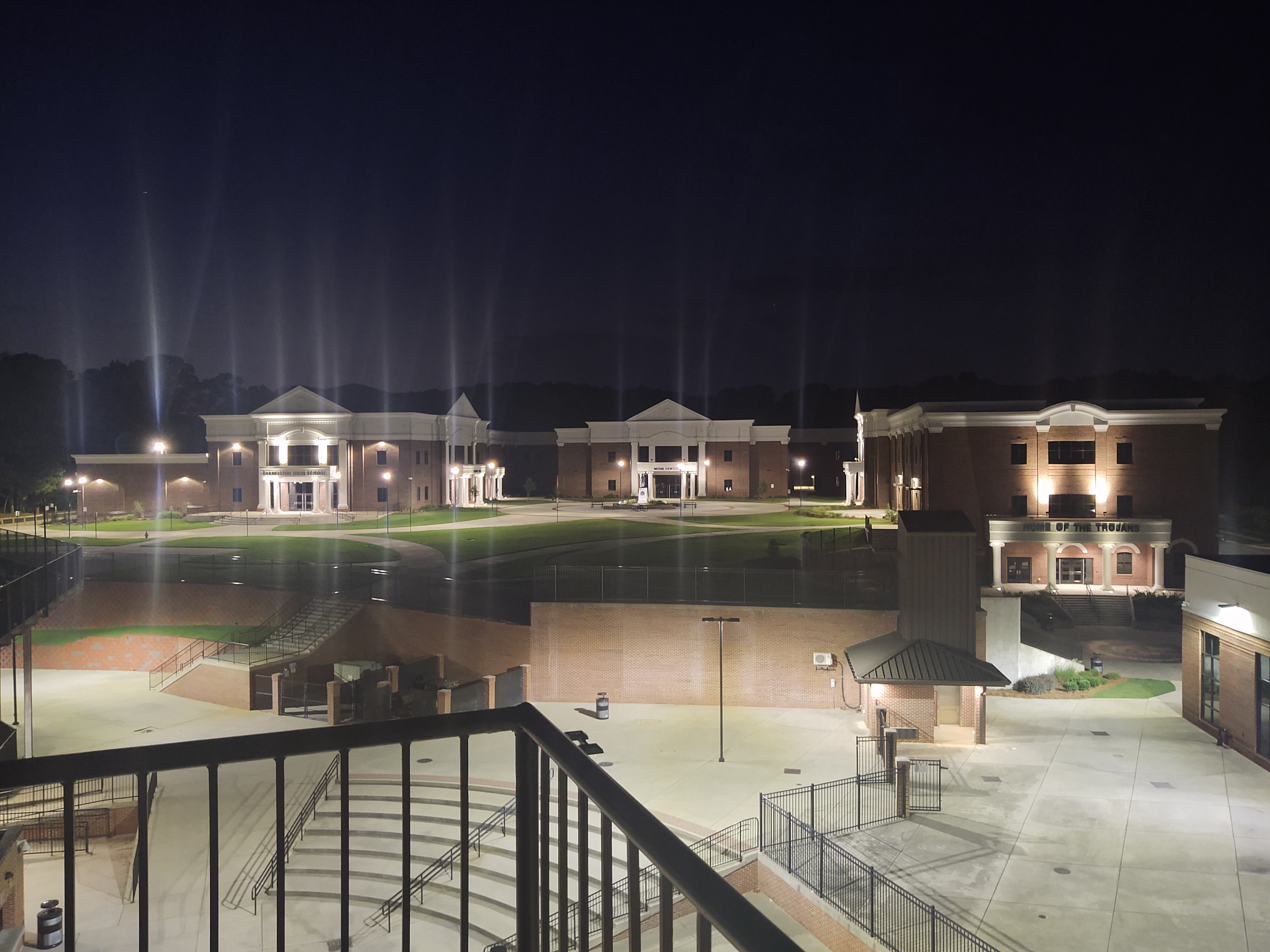
Renovated Carrollton High School courtyard

In 2016, Carrollton High School underwent major renovations to replace many existing halls that had stood since the construction of the 1963 school. The new high school, a state-of-the-art facility taking design elements from the old Reid building, was constructed in three phases, and was finalized in 2019.

== Academics ==
Carrollton High consistently ranks among the top 20 schools statewide in graduation rate performance. The school follows a 4x4 block scheduling system and offers multiple Advanced Placement and International Baccalaureate courses. A collaboration with the nearby University of West Georgia allowed high-achieving students the opportunity to attend college with the Advanced Academy of Georgia before its dismantlement in 2017 to pave the way for the more general dual enrollment program. Students in the engineering pathway are offered the chance of an internship, the Southwire Engineering Academy, at the locally headquartered Southwire Company their senior year.

== Arts ==
=== CHS Trojan Band ===
The Carrollton High School Trojan Band, one of the oldest band programs in the state, was founded in 1948. The Trojan Band includes the general marching band, a premier wind ensemble, symphonic band, concert band, jazz band, and two winterguard groups.

=== CHS Performing Arts ===
The Carrollton High School Performing Arts Program consists of the drama club and chorus program. Both groups regularly orchestrate joint musical works and theatrical presentations. The drama club participates in numerous one-act plays with GHSA.

=== Mabry Arts Center ===
The Mabry Arts Center opened in 2010 and serves as a multi-purpose theater for school concerts, plays, musicals, visual art exhibitions, and additional community meetings.

== Athletics ==
Carrollton's athletics program is a focal point of their school system; student athletes compete in the Georgia High School Association's Class 2AAAAAA. Sports teams at the school have records dating back to 1909, with the football program making an appearance in 1920. The athletic teams received the name of the Trojans in 1938. Carrollton has received numerous "Field of the Year" awards for its baseball field, and commonly hosts the GHSA's state cross country meet, as well as a "Last Chance" Invitational. Best known for their football and track & field programs, football has won seven state championships and track & field has won twenty-four state championships. Athletic teams have secured over fifty state championship titles in various sports, including soccer, baseball, golf, tennis, swimming, cheerleading, basketball, and wrestling.

=== Grisham Stadium ===
Grisham Stadium under renovation in 2008

Grisham Stadium serves as the main home field for many athletic teams in the school district.

=== Pope-McGinnis Student Activity Center ===
The Student Activity Center was built in 2019 to accommodate various athletic needs of the district. The facility houses an auxiliary basketball court, weightlifting room and the only regulation-sized indoor football field in the state of Georgia.

== Notable alumni ==
- Reggie Brown - American football player
- Chaz Chambliss - American football player
- Cooper Criswell - Professional baseball player
- Corey Crowder - professional basketball player
- Bill Hamrick - lawyer, politician, and judge
- Hollis L. Harris - former president and COO of Delta Air Lines and chairman, president, and CEO of Continental Airlines, Air Canada, and World Airways
- Josh Harris - American football player
- Zykie Helton - college football center for the Georgia Bulldogs
- Jamie Henderson - American football player
- John Willis Hurst - personal cardiologist for Lyndon B. Johnson
- Jonathan Jones - American football player
- Julian Lewis - American football player
- MJ Morris - American football player
- Caleb Odom - American football player
- Dylan Parham - American football player
- Darnell Powell - American football player
- Dontavius Russell - NFL defensive tackle
- Steve Thomas - professional basketball player
