= Carrollton City School District =

School district in Georgia (U.S. state)

Address
- 106 Trojan Drive Carrollton, Georgia, 30117-4327; United States
- Coordinates: 33.5669375°N 85.0793125°W

District information
- Motto: "The Gold Standard"
- Grades: Pre-kindergarten – 12
- Established: November 26, 1886 (138 years ago)
- Superintendent: Mark Albertus
- Accreditation(s): Southern Association of Colleges and Schools; Georgia Accrediting Commission
- NCES District ID: 1300870

Students and staff
- Enrollment: 5,612 (2022–23)
- Faculty: 323.30 (FTE)
- Staff: 319.50 (FTE)
- Student–teacher ratio: 17.36
- District mascot: Trojans
- Colors: Black and gold

Other information
- Telephone: (770) 832-9633
- Fax: (770) 834-9950
- Website: carrolltoncityschools.net

The Carrollton City School District is a public school district in Carroll County, Georgia, United States, based in and serving the city of Carrollton.

== Schools ==
The Carrollton City School District has one lower elementary school, an upper elementary school, a middle school, and a high school.

=== Elementary school ===
- Carrollton Elementary School

=== Upper elementary school ===
- Carrollton Upper Elementary School

=== Middle school ===
- Carrollton Middle School

=== High school ===
- Carrollton High School

== Awards ==
The Carrollton Board of Education has won the Exemplary Board of Achievement award for six consecutive years by the Georgia School Boards Association.

== Campus ==
All four schools, athletic fields, and additional facilities including the performing arts center and school board office are located together on a unified 130-acre campus at the intersections of Ben Scott Boulevard, Tom Reeve Drive, and Trojan Drive.

=== Facilities ===
==== Grisham Stadium ====
Grisham Stadium serves as the main home field for many athletic teams in the school district.

==== Mabry Arts Center ====
The Mabry Arts Center opened in 2010 and serves as a multi-purpose theater for school concerts, plays, musicals, visual art exhibitions, and additional community meetings.

==== Pope-McGinnis Student Activity Center ====
The Student Activity Center was built in 2019 to accommodate various athletic needs of the district. The facility houses an auxiliary basketball court, weightlifting room and the only regulation-sized indoor football field in the state of Georgia.
