= Georgia State Route 162 =

State highway in Georgia, United States

State Route 162
- SR 162 highlighted in red

Route information
- Maintained by GDOT
- Length: 18.4 mi (29.6 km)

Major junctions
- South end: SR 36 near Stewart
- SR 81 near Porterdale
- North end: I-20 / US 278 / SR 12 in Conyers

Location
- Country: United States
- State: Georgia
- Counties: Newton, Rockdale

Highway system
- Georgia State Highway System; Interstate; US; State; Special
← SR 161	→ SR 163

State Route 162 (SR 162) is a south–north state highway in the central part of the U.S. state of Georgia. Most of its route is located in Newton County; the rest is in Rockdale County.

== Route description ==
SR 162 begins at an intersection with SR 36 southwest of Stewart in Newton County, southeast of Atlanta. Traveling north, SR 162 meets SR 212 northwest of Stewart. Then, it meets SR 81 just southwest of Porterdale. It heads northwest to the extreme southeastern corner of Conyers, where it meets its northern terminus at Interstate 20/U.S. Route 278/SR 12. It serves as a major connector road for residents of southern Newton County and has seen significant growth in the past ten years.

== Major intersections ==
County	Location	mi	km	Destinations	Notes
Newton		0.0	0.0	SR 36 – Jackson, Covington	Southern terminus
Newton		4.5	7.2	SR 212 – Snapfinger, Monticello	
Newton		10.5	16.9	SR 162 Conn. north (Jackson Road)	Southern terminus of SR 162 Conn.
Newton		11.3	18.2	SR 81 – McDonough, Porterdale, Covington	
Rockdale	Conyers	18.3– 18.4	29.5– 29.6	I-20 (SR 402) / US 278 / SR 12 – Atlanta, Augusta	Northern terminus
1.000 mi = 1.609 km; 1.000 km = 0.621 mi

== SR 162 Connector ==
State Route 162 Connector
- Location: Porterdale
- Length: 1.5 mi (2.4 km)

State Route 162 Connector (SR 162 Conn.) is a one-and-a-half-mile-long (2.4 km) connector route of SR 162 southwest of Porterdale. The road, also known as Jackson Road, begins at an intersection with SR 162 in a rural area. It heads north, passing numerous homes and wooded areas, then makes a sweeping S-curve before heading north again. Except near its midpoint, where it passes an auto dealership and a general store, SR 162 Conn. travels through residential areas. The road comes to an end at a stop-controlled intersection with SR 81 inside the city limits of Porterdale.
