= U.S. Route 278 in Georgia =

Segment of U.S. Highway in Georgia

U.S. Highway 278
- US 278 highlighted in red

Route information
- Auxiliary route of US 78
- Maintained by GDOT
- Length: 234.4 mi (377.2 km)
- Existed: 1955–present
- History: SR 12 established at least as early as 1919

Major junctions
- West end: US 278 / SR 74 / SR 6 at the Alabama state line near Esom Hill
- US 27 / SR 1 in Cedartown; US 78 / SR 8 in Lithia Springs; I-285 in Atlanta and Belvedere Park; I-75 / I-85 in Atlanta; I-20 at various locations; US 129 / US 441 / SR 24 / SR 83 in Madison; US 78 / SR 10 east of Thomson; I-520 in Augusta; US 1 / SR 4 Augusta; US 25 / SR 121 in Augusta
- East end: US 1 / US 25 / US 78 / US 278 / SC 121 / SR 10 at the South Carolina state line in Augusta

Location
- Country: United States
- State: Georgia
- Counties: Polk, Paulding, Douglas, Cobb, Fulton, DeKalb, Rockdale, Newton, Walton, Morgan, Greene, Taliaferro, Warren, McDuffie, Columbia, Richmond

Highway system
- United States Numbered Highway System; List; Special; Divided; Georgia State Highway System; Interstate; US; State; Special
← SR 277	→ SR 278
← SR 11E	SR 12	→ SR 13

U.S. Route 278 (US 278) in the state of Georgia is a 234.4-mile-long (377.2 km) east–west United States Numbered Highway traversing the north-central portion of the state. The highway travels from the Alabama state line near Esom Hill to the South Carolina state line where it crosses the Savannah River in the Augusta metropolitan area.

The route is concurrent with SR 6 from the Alabama state line to Lithia Springs, SR 100 and SR 1 in Cedartown, SR 8 from Lithia Springs to Decatur, SR 5 from Lithia Springs to Austell, and SR 10 from Atlanta to Avondale Estates, and again from Thomson to the South Carolina state line. It is entirely concurrent with SR 12 for 118 miles (190 km), and is briefly concurrent with the southern terminus of SR 124 in Lithonia.

Concurrencies of US 278 with US highways in Georgia include two long ones with its parent route US 78 from Lithia Springs to Druid Hills, and again from east of Thomson to the South Carolina state line. Others include US 19/US 41 in the vicinity of Georgia Tech in Atlanta, US 29 from Georgia Tech to Druid Hills, US 23 from the eastern part of Atlanta to Druid Hills, US 129/US 441 in the vicinity of Madison, US 1 from Augusta to the South Carolina state line, and US 25 from Augusta to the South Carolina state line.

It is also concurrent with I-20 from exit 75 in Lithonia until it reaches exit 90 in Covington in Newton County. US 278 largely travels parallel to I-20 from Douglas County to Aiken County, South Carolina.

== Route description ==
=== State Route 6 concurrency ===
The highway starts at the Alabama state line, near Esom Hill in Polk County, and is concurrent with SR 6 from its western terminus. It travels southeast as a two-lane undivided highway until the intersection with Hardin Road, where it curves northeast. Along the way, it travels straight east along the north edge of a waterway known as Esom Slough, then turns to the northeast again at the intersection with Brewster Field Road. Getting away from Esom Hill, it travels through a community known as Akes, and only has intersections with three local roads; Branch Road to the northwest, Akes Station Road to the southwest, and Lewis Drive West to the southeast, From there the highway takes another curve to the northeast, although this time more directly than earlier. At some point, it also passes a short formerly proposed eastbound right-of-way. Just before entering Cedartown, the road is joined by a concurrency with SR 100 (Canal Road). At a bridge over an abandoned Seaboard Air Line Railroad line, it travels over a connecting spur to the Silver Comet Trail, and officially enters the City of Cedartown. The spur leads to a trailhead on the northeast corner of the bridge, while the trail itself travels along the south side of the road beginning at the southeast corner of the bridge. The trail continues to run along the south side of the road as it passes an Underwriters Laboratory building, and then crosses a bridge over Dry Creek, where it loops around like the inner ramps of a cloverleaf interchange and leaves the side of the road to travel along the east bank of the creek. Condominiums are along the north side of the road and single-family houses line the south side until it reaches U.S. Route 27 Bus./SR 1 Bus. (Main Street). From there, Canal Street becomes Martin Luther King, Junior Boulevard. This segment of the highway shifts between southeast and east trajectories and, at one point, crosses an at-grade former Central of Georgia Railway line. MLK Jr Boulevard travels southeast for the last time and ends at a short concurrency with US 27/SR 1, where SR 100 turns south and US 278/SR 6 turns north. That concurrency ends at an overpass with two connecting roads on the southwest and northeast corners.

The Silver Comet Trail, which travels in close proximity with US 278 from the Alabama state line flanks the highway directly along the south side for the second time east of the bridge over Fish Creek. At the border with Rockmart, US 278 Bus./SR 6 Bus. branches off to the southeast, while mainline US 278/SR 6 curves to the northeast onto Nathan Dean Parkway. Before the intersection of Calloway Drive, the Silver Comet Trail makes a sharp turn south. The eastern terminus of US 278 Bus./SR 6 Bus. is also the west end of the concurrency with SR 101. US 278/SR 6/SR 101 makes a slight turn to the southeast where it encounters the intersection with SR 113, and that route joins them as they all turns south. US 278/SR 6/SR 101/SR 113 leaves the city limits at a bridge over Braswell Road and a parallel railroad line. Just after the intersection with Fairview Road, the routes curve to the southeast. The concurrency travels over a bridge above the Silver Comet Trail again, just before the intersection with Atlanta Highway and Coots Lake Road, the former of which was once a segment of US 278/SR 6/SR 101/SR 113. Not long after this, the highway passes by Coots Lake, for which the latter road is named. SR 101/SR 113 leaves the concurrency a little further southeast, and after descending into a slight valley, US 278/SR 6 crosses the Polk–Paulding county line, where the street name is changed to Rockmart Highway. Along the way, it passes by few sites of any note other than Paulding Northwest Atlanta Airport. Further east, a former segment on the opposite side called "Wayside Lane" begins, which serves the Lillian C. Poole Elementary School, and Wayside Baptist Church. Wayside Lane ends west of a power line right-of-way.

After the west end of Olivet Loop (another former segment) and at a break in the median, the route officially enters Dallas. At the intersection of the east end of Olivet Loop and Vista Lake Drive, Rockmart Highway becomes the Jimmy Campbell Parkway. What passes for a major intersection after this is West Memorial Drive, another former segment of the highways. A real major intersection follows shortly, specifically Buchanan Street, where SR 120 and SR 6 Bus. meet. SR 120 joins US 278/SR 6 in a concurrency and curves further southeast away from Downtown Dallas. At a self-storage facility, the highways curve to the east again just before the intersection with Academy Drive and Vernoy–Aiken Road, and then intersects SR 61 just before curving to the southeast again. Just after curving back towards the east, it crosses a bridge over a former Seaboard Air Line Railroad line and becomes the Jimmy Lee Smith Parkway. The last intersection in Dallas is the shared intersection with Butler Industrial Drive and Cadillac Parkway. Just before the intersection with Paris Road, US 278/SR 6/SR 120 enters Hiram. As the highway passes by the Wellstar Paulding Hospital complex, the concurrency with SR 120 ends at the intersection with SR 360, where SR 120 turns north. The road continues to the east but curves to the southeast as it approaches the next major intersection, which is the east end of SR 6 Bus. Curving east-southeast it travels along a long line of commercial zoning where it intersects SR 92. After three other signalized intersections, two of which are driveways to shopping centers, the road intersects Greenfield and Metromont Roads, where Jimmy Lee Smith Parkway becomes Wendy Bagwell Parkway. After the intersection with Isley Stamper Road, US 278/SR 6 crosses the Paulding–Cobb county line and enters Powder Springs, where the name of the road is now "C.H. James Parkway." Commercial development is reduced, but not eliminated. A former segment of the road branches off to the southeast just before the intersection with Elliot Road and Powder Springs–Dallas Road. One last intersection with Florence Road can be found before US 278/SR 6 makes a sharp curve to the south. From there, the road approaches a pedestrian bridge under the Silver Comet Trail, which is the route's final encounter with the trail, and then approaches the intersection with Richard D. Sailors Parkway, the former SR 176/SR 6 Bus. From there, it climbs a bridge over Powder Springs–Dallas Road and a parallel former Southern Railway line now owned by Norfolk Southern Railway. Curving back to the southeast after the intersection with Hill Road Southwest, the highway travels through a western portion of Austell, where it passes by a major Norfolk Southern Railway yard. Access to that yard is available at the intersection with SR 6 Spur. One last bridge over a railroad line south of Humphries Hill Road is crossed as C.H. James Parkway becomes Thornton Road. After the intersection with a dead end street named Center Street, US 278/SR 6 finally enters Lithia Springs and curves to the southeast.

=== Lithia Springs to Avondale Estates ===
In Lithia Springs, SR 6 continues southeast towards College Park, while US 278 turns left onto US 78/SR 5/SR 8, and returns to Austell. Within "downtown" Austell, US 78/US 278/SR 5/SR 8 becomes Veterans Memorial Highway, makes a sharp right turn and runs along the south side of a railroad line. East of a bridge over Sweetwater Creek, SR 5 splits from US 78/US 278/SR 8 at an interchange with Markham Road and heads slightly northeast through the western parts of Smyrna to just west of Dobbins Air Reserve Base. US 78/US 278/SR 8 curves southeast of the tracks, but meets up with them again as it enters Mableton, near Church Street Southwest and Old Floyd Road, only to move away from the tracks again where the routes also encounter the northern terminus of SR 139 which continues into Floyd Road Southwest. Veterans Memorial Highway curves more towards the southeast until just before passing by Lindley Middle School, where it briefly leads back towards the east, only to curve southeast again in the vicinity of Mount Harmony Memorial Gardens.

Veterans Memorial Highway ends at the bridge over the Chattahoochee River and becomes Donald Lee Hollowell Parkway Northwest as it enters Atlanta. The first site within the city is the industrial complex containing the Atlanta Public Safety Annex across from the site of the abandoned Bankhead Courts housing project and park. Across from an industrial park, it encounters the northern terminus of SR 70 and then approaches the first interchange with I-285 at exit 12. Continuing southeast, it travels along the southern edge of Brookview Heights and the northern edge of Collier Heights until it reaches SR 280. East of there, it travels through northern Center Hill and then into Grove Park. The highway intersects Hollywood Drive Northwest, and makes a sharp southeast curve at the same trajectory. It starts to move more towards the east before reaching the Bankhead neighborhood then runs under the Bankhead (MARTA station) along the MARTA Green Line. After an entrance to that station, the road becomes a divided highway as it travels along the northern edge of Maddox Park, then passes under another railroad bridge containing pylons for a second track. Almost instantly the divider ends before the intersection with Marietta Boulevard Northwest, then climbs an embankment to a bridge over an abandoned railroad line. From there, the highway travels straight east and after the intersection with Joseph E. Lowery Boulevard, enters the English Avenue neighborhood where it travels over another bridge over an abandoned railroad line. Donald Lee Hollowell Parkway Northwest ends at US 19/US 41 in front of Georgia Tech, and US 78/US 278/SR 8 turns southeast along US 19/US 41 (Northside Drive Northwest) to the southeast. At the end of the US 19/US 41 concurrency, the highway is joined by US 29 and all three US highways travel along North Avenue Northeast. Tunneling under some railroad lines, including some abandoned ones, US 29/US 78/US 278/SR 8 travels between Georgia Tech territory and Coca-Cola owned property. After traveling along the south side of Bobby Dodd Stadium, it encounters an interchange with I-75/I-85 (Downtown Connector), at exit 249D. Two blocks later, it passes by North Avenue (MARTA station), where North Avenue Northwest becomes North Avenue Northeast.

For one block between Juniper Street and Piedmont Avenue, US 29/US 78/US 278/SR 8 only travels eastbound along North Avenue Northeast. These two streets are one-way pairs along that block where the eastbound highways travel along that street, then turn north onto Piedmont Avenue and then east again onto Ponce de Leon Avenue, while the westbound highways travel from Piedmont to Juniper for one block along Ponce de Leon Avenue, then turn south onto Juniper Street and west again onto North Avenue Northeast. The southeast corner of Piedmont and Ponce de Leon includes the Savannah College of Art and Design's Ivy Hall Writing Center. US 29/US 78/US 278/SR 8 continues to wind through Historic Midtown and the Old Fourth Ward, where it travels along the northern edge of an A.I.D.S. hospice, then the site of the former Ponce de Leon Park (now occupied by a shopping center) and Ponce City Market next to the bridge under the Atlanta Beltline Rail Trail. Traveling between the Poncey-Highland and Virginia-Highland neighborhoods, it approaches the western leg of the Freedom Parkway (a formerly proposed extension of SR 400), where the concurrency with SR 10 begins. The five highways pass the Briarcliff Plaza shopping center and intersect North Highland Avenue then travels along the southern edge of Atkins Park, where it encounters an intersection with US 23/SR 42 (Briarcliff Road Northeast / Moreland Avenue Northeast), and US 23 joins the concurrency as all four US routes and two state routes cross the DeKalb County line.

South Ponce de Leon Avenue immediately splits off to the southeast, but US 23/US 29/US 78/US 278/SR 8/SR 10 only travels along the main Ponce de Leon Avenue along the northern edges of Springdale Park, Virgilee Park, and Brightwood Park, while South Ponce de Leon travels along the south side of these parks. This pattern ends at Lullwater and Fairview Roads, but is repeated again shortly afterwards at Shady Side Park and Dellwood Park, where the routes enter Druid Hills. On the opposite side, a North Ponce de Leon Avenue runs along the northern edge of Deepdene Park while US 23/US 29/US 78/SR 8 branches off to the northeast traveling along the south side of that park, awaiting the reunification of North Ponce de Leon Avenue with its parent street.

US 278/SR 10 branches off to the southeast onto East Lake Road Northeast, and the first notable feature is the St. Elias Antiochian Orthodox Church, across from a triangle with US 23/US 29/US 78/SR 8, which also has a Jefferson Davis Highway marker. East Lake Road Northeast travels southeast as a two-lane road with a continuous center-left turn lane that is momentarily suspended by a divider at a railroad crossing as it enters East Lake, Georgia. The road curves south and has an intersection with a connecting road to West Howard Avenue. That road is one of two that travel along the MARTA Blue Line. US 278/SR 10 travels under West Howard Avenue, then the MARTA Blue Line as well as a parallel CSX freight line and College Avenue Northeast, and then turns right at a connecting road to the aforementioned road at East Lake (MARTA station). From there, the highway turns northeast onto College Avenue and follows the freight line. Across from a local street named Cambridge Avenue, the Blue Line leaves the right-of-way for the freight line as both enter Decatur. In the meantime, US 278/SR 10 has a short concurrency with SR 155 between South Candler Street and Commerce Drive. The Blue Line returns across from the freight line along US 278/SR 10, and after traveling under a pedestrian bridge for Avondale (MARTA station), the road curves away from both lines to the east. East of the Twin Oaks shopping center, the name of US 278/SR 10 changes from East College Avenue to North Avondale Road as it enters Avondale Estates, while a local street named South Avondale Road branches off to run parallel to it. The road curves again this time to the southeast at Clarendon Avenue.

=== State Route 12 concurrency ===
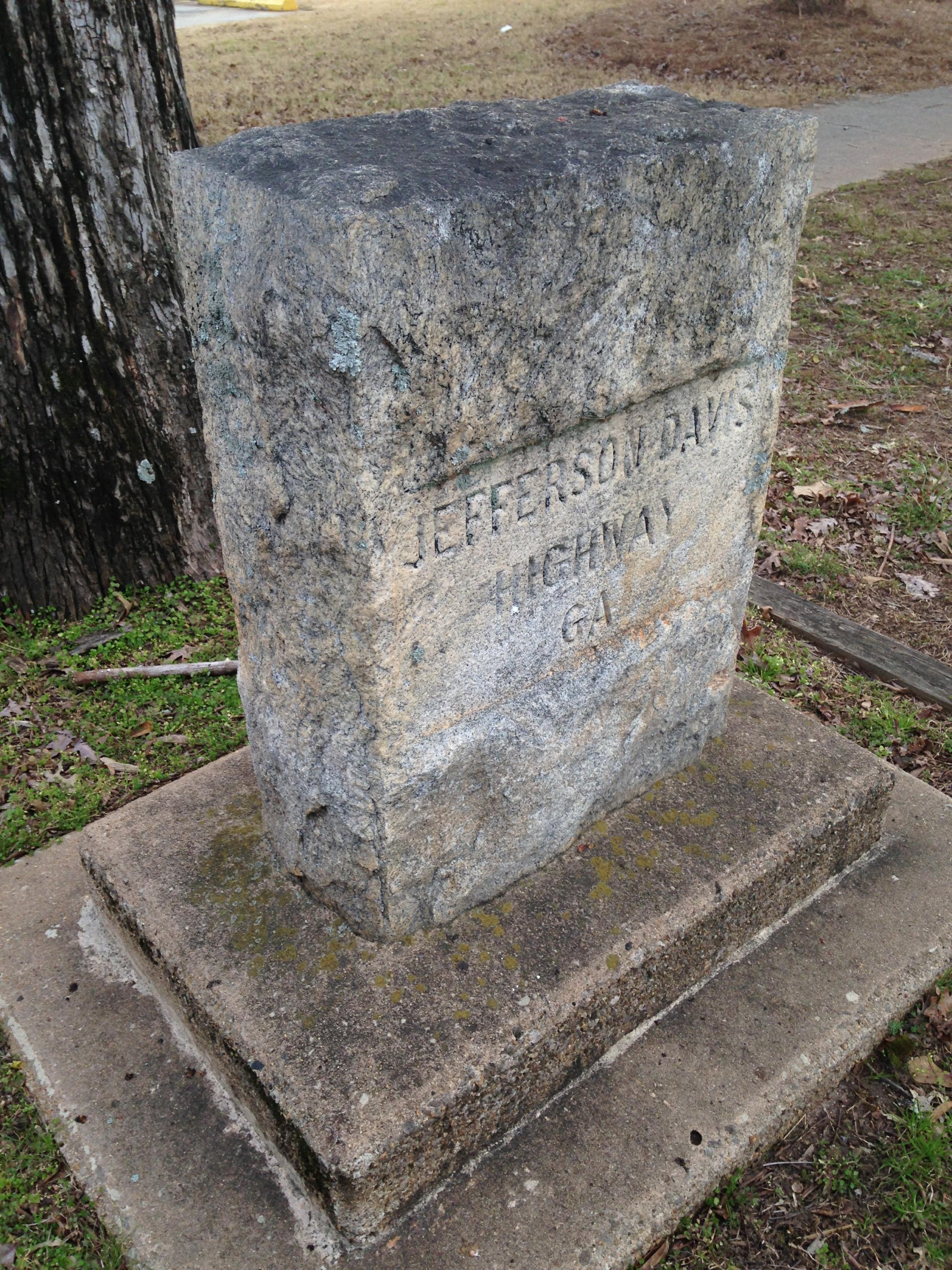
A Jefferson Davis Highway marker along US 129/278/441 in Madison

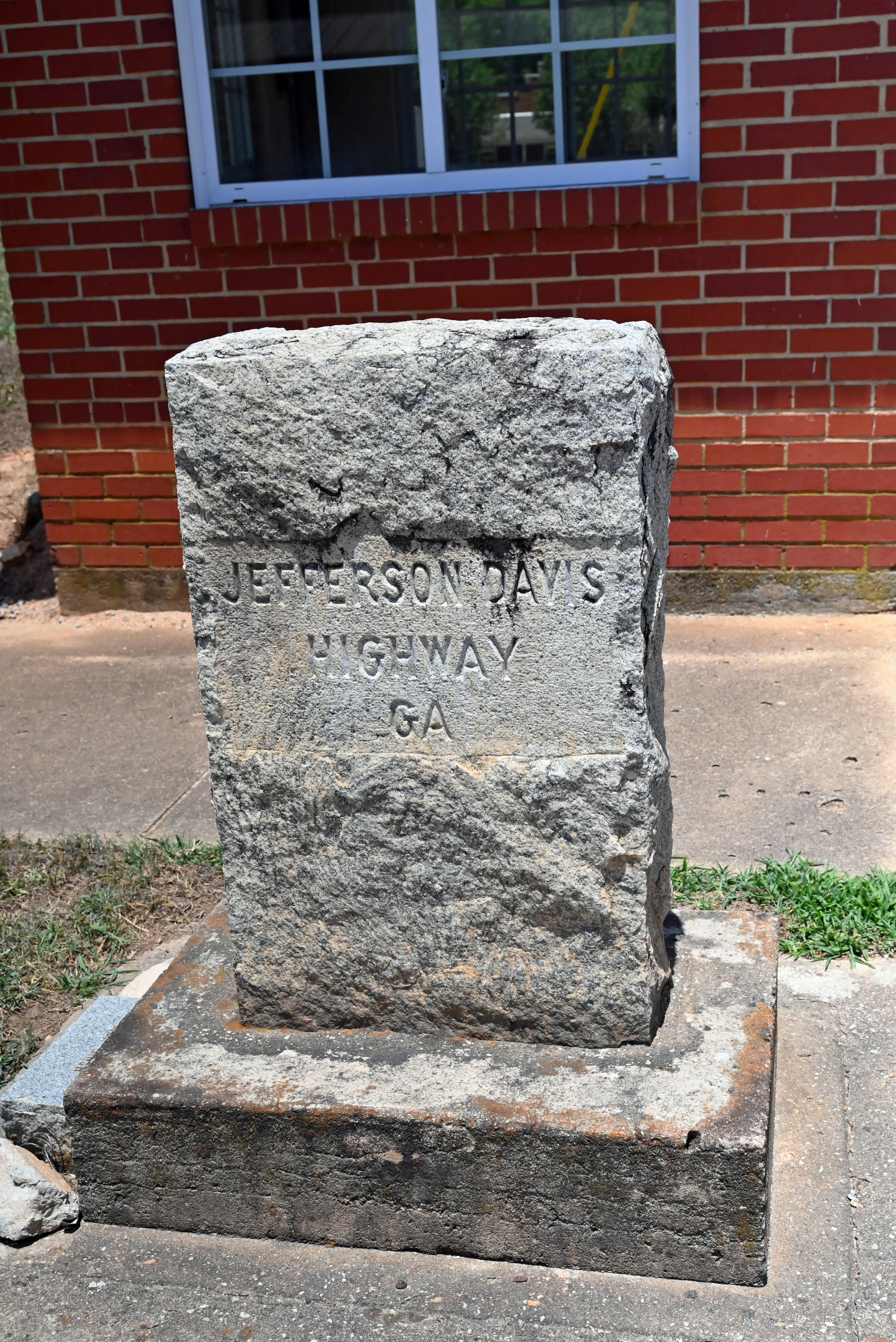
Jefferson Davis Highway marker in US 278 in Crawfordsville

SR 10 leaves US 278 as it turns northeast onto Mountain Road, and SR 12 begins, replacing it as the route's concurrent state highway. SR 12 starts on the eastern edge Avondale Estates, continuing the southeast trajectory previously used by SR 10. Along the way, it intersects a local street named Kensington Road providing access to Kensington (MARTA station). The road briefly turns straight south after SR 154, but then turns southeast again crossing I-285 for the second time at exit 43. US 278/SR 12 continues through Lithonia, where it merges with and is concurrent with SR 124 until it reaches its southern terminus at I-20 at exit 75. From there, the three highways are concurrent through Conyers and Rockdale County to Covington in Newton County. In Covington, US 278/SR 12 splits from I-20 at exit 90 and parallels the interstate on its southern side in an easterly direction to south of Social Circle, where the two highways cross I-20 at exit 101 and continue to parallel the interstate, now on its northern side.

The highway continues into Morgan County and travels through Rutledge and then Madison where it has a concurrency with SR 83. Shortly after this, it has a wye intersection with SR 24 Spur, which also serves as part of US 278 Truck/SR 12 Truck. Curving northwest, it joins another concurrency with US 129/US 441/SR 24. Within downtown Madison, the concurrency with SR 83 ends when that highway turns north onto West Washington Street. The concurrency with US 129/US 441/SR 24 ends across from the northern terminus of US 129 Byp./US 441 Byp./US 278 Truck/SR 12 Truck/SR 24 Byp. (Madison Bypass).

Crossing a bridge over the Apalachee into Greene County, the highway travels through part of the Oconee National Forest before heading through Greensboro where a concurrency with SR 15 begins at North Laurel Street and another one with SR 44 begins at South Main Street. The SR 15 concurrency ends at Siloam Road, but the one with SR 44 continues along US 278/SR 12 into Union Point, where SR 44 turns north onto SR 77, and US 278/SR 12 turns southeast onto another concurrency with SR 77 within the city. Continuing southeast into Taliaferro County, the highway passes through Crawfordville where it intersects SR 22. From Crawfordville, the highway heads southeast, crosses into Warren County, and crosses I-20 at exit 154 to its southern side once again south of Sharon. US 278/SR 12 continues south into Warrenton, turns straight east at an intersection with US 278 Byp./SR 12 Byp. traveling south of the city, then serves as the eastern terminus of SR 16. The intersection with SR 80 also serves as the east end of US 278 Byp./SR 12 Byp., then the highway travels northeast into McDuffie County. The intersection with Wire Road seems unimportant other than serving as a de facto connecting route with SR 17, which it will encounter in downtown Thomson. Beyond SR 17 the highway travels east and then southeast as SR 12 ends at another concurrency (US 78/SR 10/SR 17 Byp).

=== US 78 eastern concurrency ===
Though SR 12 ends at US 78/SR 10, US 278 returns to a second concurrency with US 78/SR 10 and all three highways travel to the southeast as Augusta Highway. SR 17 Byp. travels to the south-southwest, as well. The three highways stairstep their way to the southeast, crossing over Sweetwater Creek and traveling near Boneville. Southwest of Boneville, they cross over ponds and streams named for the community. Just before the intersection with Wire Road and Ellington Airline Road, they curve to the east-northeast. Just to the west of Old Augusta Road, US 78/US 278/SR 10 curve to the east-southeast. They curve to the southeast and enter Dearing. In town, they curve to the east and intersect School Drive, which leads to Augusta Technical College's Adult Education Center and Dearing Elementary School. The concurrency curves to the northeast and then back to the east-southeast, before they cross over Boggy Gut Creek and enter Columbia County.

Approximately 600 feet (180 m) after entering the county, US 78/US 278/SR 10 enter the western city limits of Harlem. Just to the southeast of West Boundary Street, they travel about two and a half blocks south of Harlem Middle School. In the main part of town, they intersect US 221/SR 47 (Louisville Street). At the southeastern edge of the city limits, the roadway becomes known as Gordon Highway, which is a major urban corridor farther to the east. The highways travel through Campania and Berzelia. A few thousand feet later, they curve to the northeast, crossing into Richmond County (and the city limits of Augusta), and begin paralleling the northern edge of Fort Gordon.

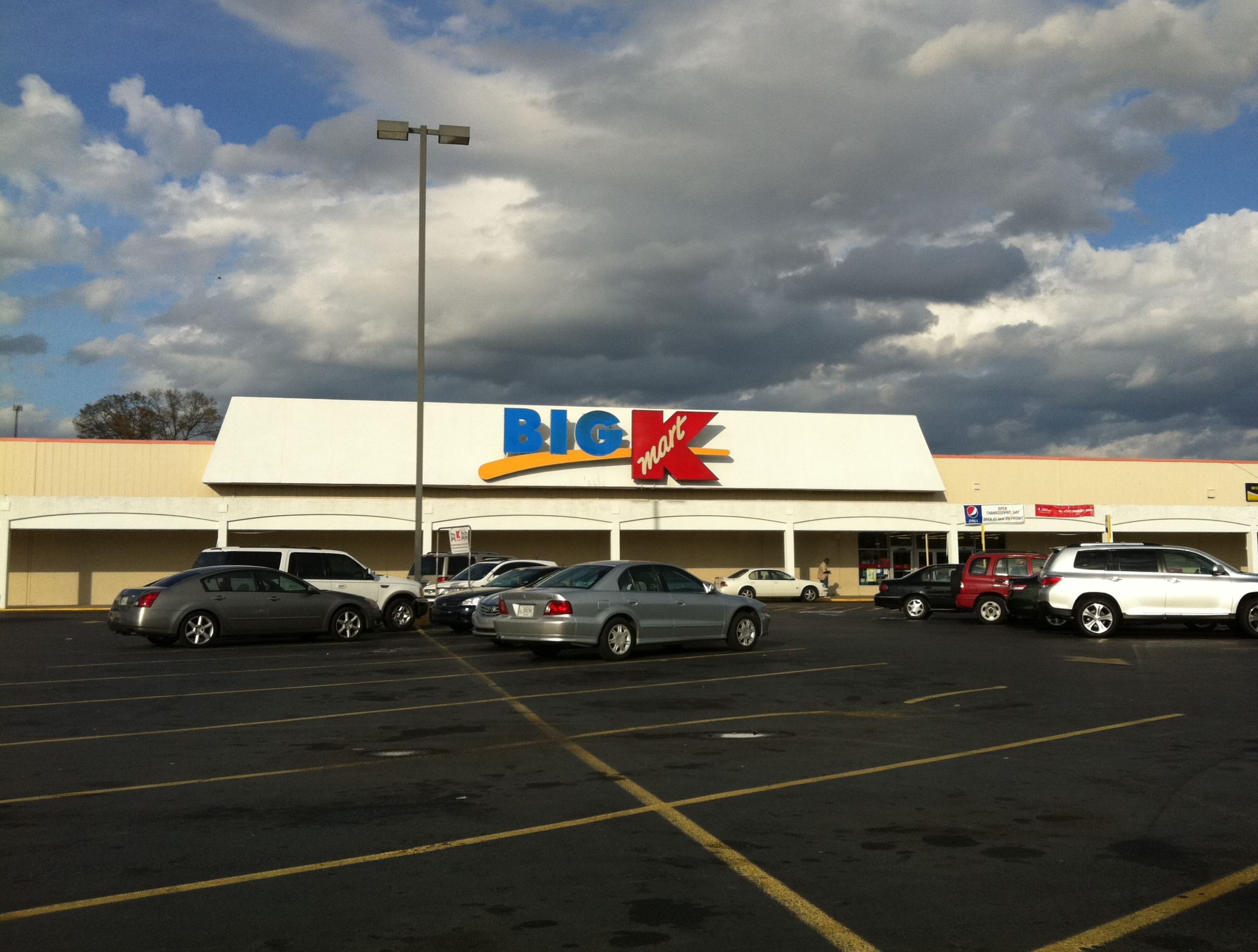
Former Kmart store on US 1/US 78/US 278/SR 10 (Gordon Highway)

US 78/US 278/SR 10 serve as the access point for Gordon Park Speedway and Augusta State Medical Prison. A short distance later is Fort Gordon's Gate 3, a commercial vehicle gate for the Army base and Gate 2, a variable-hour gate. At the intersection for Gate 2, the highway also intersects the eastern terminus of SR 223 (East Robinson Avenue). Approximately 3.4 miles (5.5 km) later is an intersection with the southern terminus of SR 383 (Jimmie Dyess Parkway) and the northern terminus of an access road to Fort Gordon's Gate 1, the 24-hour main gate for the base. About halfway between here and the interchange with I-520 (Bobby Jones Expressway), the three highways leave the edge of Fort Gordon and begin to transition into an urban corridor. After the interstate, the roadway enters the main part of Augusta, passing south of Aquinas High School, and curves to the south-southeast, past the location of the now-closed Regency Mall. Immediately after a slight curve to the east is an intersection with US 1/SR 4 (Deans Bridge Road). US 1 joins the concurrency, while SR 4 continues to the northeast into downtown. The four-highway concurrency curves slightly to the east-southeast to an interchange with US 25/SR 121 (Peach Orchard Road), which both join the concurrency. The six highways travel to the east-northeast and intersect the northern terminus of former SR 56 Spur (Doug Barnard Parkway) and the southern terminus of Molly Pond Road. The highways curve to the north-northeast and intersect Laney Walker Boulevard, thus effectively entering downtown. They pass just to the northwest of Magnolia Cemetery, Cedar Grove Cemetery, and May Park and southeast of James Brown Arena. A short distance later, they travel to the east of Old Medical College and the Old Government House, then they have an interchange with US 25 Bus./SR 28 (Broad Street). Here, US 25 Bus. meets its southern terminus. Just after this interchange, the highways cross over the Savannah River into South Carolina. At the state line, SR 10 ends, while US 1/US 25/US 78/US 278, travels concurrent with SC 121. The concurrency curves to the northeast toward North Augusta, and ultimately to Hilton Head Island, South Carolina.

=== National Highway System ===
The following portions of US 278 in Georgia, including portions of SR 12 from Avondale Estates to Augusta, are part of the National Highway System, a system of routes determined to be the most important for the nation's economy, mobility, and defense:

- From the Alabama state line to the eastern end of the SR 10 concurrency in Avondale Estates
- From the eastern end of the I-20 concurrency to the intersection with SR 36/SR 142 in Covington
- The brief concurrency with US 129/US 441/SR 24 in Madison
- The brief concurrency with SR 15 in Greensboro
- The entire Richmond County portion

== History ==
=== 1920s ===
SR 12 was established at least as early as 1919 from SR 8 in Decatur to Augusta, with a south-southwestern turn to end in Waynesboro. The Covington–Madison segment traveled through Social Circle. SR 6 was established from SR 1 in Cedartown to SR 8 in Austell. SR 8 was established from SR 6 in Austell to SR 12 in Decatur. SR 21 was designated on SR 12 in Augusta. By the end of September 1921, SR 6 was extended westward to the Alabama state line. SR 12's western terminus was shifted east-northeast to Ingleside, while its eastern terminus was truncated to end in Augusta. By October 1926, US 78 was designated on SR 8 from Austell to Avondale and on SR 12 from Thomson to Augusta. US 29 was designated on SR 8 from Atlanta to Decatur. US 1 was designated on US 78/SR 10/SR 12 in Augusta. An unnumbered road was established on a more direct path between Covington and Madison. Two segments had a "completed hard surface": from the Cobb–Fulton county line to Avondale and a portion in the west-southwest part of Augusta. By October 1929, US 19 was designated on US 29/US 78/SR 8/SR 12 from Atlanta to Decatur. Three segments were completed: a portion northwest of Covington, from southeast of Social Circle to west of Greensboro, and the entire Richmond County portion (except for the western end).

=== 1930s ===
By the middle of 1930, three segments were completed: the eastern part of the Polk County portion of the Cedartown–Dallas segment, the eastern part of the Cobb County portion of the Dallas–Austell segment, and from just west of the DeKalb–Rockdale county line to Covington. Later that year, US 25 was designated on US 1/US 78/SR 10/SR 12 in Augusta. Two segments had a completed hard surface: the Austell–Atlanta segment and a portion in the eastern part of Covington. Also, the unnumbered road (from east of Covington to southeast of Social Circle) was also completed. By the beginning of 1932, SR 12's path between Covington and Madison was shifted southward onto the previously unnumbered road. The western part remained as SR 11, while the eastern part was redesignated as SR 60. The Avondale–Conyers and Thomson–Augusta segments were completed. In February 1932, US 19 was shifted off of SR 8 to the north; US 23 was designated on the Atlanta–Lawrenceville segment instead. In April, the western half of the Cedartown–Rockmart segment was completed. By the beginning of August, two segments were completed: from northwest of Crawfordville to just east of the Taliaferro–Warren county line and the entire McDuffie County portion (except for the extreme western end). In August, the entire McDuffie County portion was completed. Between November 1932 and May 1933, the Warren County portion of the Warrenton–Thomson segment was completed. The next year, the Cedartown–Rockmart segment, a portion in the southeastern part of Dallas, and the Madison–Greensboro segment, were completed. At the end of 1936, the Dallas–Austell segment was completed. By April 1937, the Crawfordville–Warrenton segment was completed. By July, the Greensboro–Union Point segment was completed. By the end of 1937, US 1/US 78/SR 4/SR 10/SR 12 were indicated to have entered the main part of Augusta on Milledgeville Road; they intersected US 25/SR 121 (Savannah Road); all seven highways traveled on Twiggs Street and 7th Street to an intersection with SR 28 (Broad Street); US 1/US 78/SR 4/SR 10/SR 12/SR 28 traveled east-southeast on Broad Street to an intersection with 5th Street; and US 1/US 78/SR 4/SR 10/SR 12 traveled on 5th Street to the South Carolina state line. The next year, the Polk County portion of the Rockmart–Dallas segment was completed. By the middle of 1939, the Union Point–Crawfordville segment had a completed hard surface.

=== 1940s and 1950s ===
In 1940, a portion west-southwest of Dallas was completed. By the beginning of 1941, two segments were completed: the western part of the Alabama–Cedartown segment and the Rockmart–Dallas segment. Between the beginning of 1945 and November 1946, the entire segment of SR 6 from Alabama to Austell was hard surfaced. Between June 1954 and June 1955, US 278 was designated on SR 6 from the Alabama state line to Austell, US 78 from Austell to the South Carolina state line, SR 8 from Austell to just east of Atlanta, and SR 12 from east-southeast of Avondale Estates to the South Carolina state line. By June 1955, Gordon Highway was established around the southwest side of Augusta and proposed to the 5th Street/Gwinnett Street intersection. It began on US 78/SR 10/SR 12 (with US 278 newly designated on it) west-southwest of Augusta to US 25/SR 121 south of the city. No numbered highways were indicated to be designated on it, so US 1/SR 4 remained on its previous path. It had an interchange with US 25/SR 21. US 1/US 78/SR 4/SR 10/SR 12 split off of the US 78/US 278/SR 10/SR 12 concurrency just north-northeast of Gwinnett Street, where US 278 reached its eastern terminus. It traveled north-northeast to Calhoun Street, east-southeast to 5th Street, and resumed its 5th Street path, albeit on a more southern starting point. By the middle of 1957, Gordon Highway was completed around the southern and eastern sides of Augusta to 5th Street just north-northeast of Gwinnett Street in the city. US 1/US 25/US 78/US 278 was shifted onto the highway, with SR 4/SR 12 and possibly SR 10 remaining on Milledgeville Road, Twiggs Street, 7th Street, and Broad Street.

=== 1960s and 1970s ===
By June 1960, SR 10 was shifted off of SR 4 and onto Gordon Highway. SR 21 was extended onto the SR 4/SR 12 concurrency on Twiggs Street and 7th Street. SR 21 reached its northern terminus at Broad Street. US 25 was shifted off of Broad Street and onto Gordon Highway, which was extended to the South Carolina state line. Its former path was redesignated as part of US 25 Bus. Between June 1963 and the beginning of 1966, SR 21 was extended west-northwest on US 25 Bus./SR 28 (Broad Street) and followed the business route to the South Carolina state line. SR 121 was extended on Gordon Highway from the US 25/SR 21/SR 121 interchange to the state line. Also, the intersection of Gordon Highway and Broad Street was converted into an interchange. Between the beginning of 1963 and the beginning of 1969, a northern bypass of the main part of Rockmart was built from US 278/SR 6 west-northwest of the city to SR 113 in the northwestern part of the city. By the beginning of 1974, an eastern bypass of the main part of Rockmart was proposed from US 278/SR 6/SR 100 southeast of Van Wert north-northwest and north to SR 113 in the northwest part of Rockmart. Between the beginning of 1979 and the beginning of 1982, SR 6's path in Cedartown was shifted westward one block, replacing the entire length of SR 6 Loop.

=== 1980s ===
In 1981, SR 21's northern terminus was truncated to Millen. SR 4's Milledgeville Road portion was truncated to the 15th Street intersection. It was routed on 15th Street, Walton Way, and then resumed its 13th Street path, just with a more southerly starting point. In 1983, a western bypass of Powder Springs, Clarkdale, and Austell, designated as SR 726, was proposed from an unnumbered road south-southwest of Powder Springs to US 78/SR 5/SR 8 southwest of Austell. In 1986, a slightly northern rerouting of US 278/SR 6 was proposed from just east of the Paulding–Cobb county line to the northern part of Powder Springs. US 278/SR 6 in the Powder Springs–Austell area was shifted westward, onto the path of SR 726 and the northern part of the unnumbered road in Powder Springs. The former path from Powder Springs to Austell was redesignated as SR 6 Bus. Camp Creek Parkway was extended north-northwest to connect with the eastern terminus of SR 6. The next year, SR 744 Spur was proposed from US 27/SR 1/SR 100 in the southern part of Cedartown to the proposed path of SR 744 southeast of it. Part of the eastern bypass of Rockmart, designated as SR 748, was proposed from SR 113 east-northeast of the city south and south-southeast to US 278/SR 6 east-southeast of Van Wert. A northeastern bypass of Yorkville, designated as SR 789, was proposed from north-northeast of Yorkville to east of it. A southern bypass of Dallas, designated as SR 768, was proposed from west-southwest of Dallas to US 278/SR 6/SR 120 southeast of it; this replaced the proposed path of SR 6 Byp. In 1988, a proposed northern rerouting of US 278/SR 6 was designated as a second iteration of SR 726.

=== 1990s ===
In 1990, US 278/SR 6 was shifted northeast from Van Wert on SR 113 and southeast on the proposed path of SR 748, with SR 101/SR 113 concurrent with them to Yorkville. US 278/SR 6/SR 120 was routed on the proposed path of SR 768. At this time, SR 726 was completed. The next year, the path of US 278/SR 6 in Cedartown was shifted southward from the central part of the city to the southern part, onto the proposed path of SR 744 Spur. US 278/SR 6, as well as part of US 27/SR 1, was routed onto parts of the former path of SR 744. US 278/SR 6 in Rockmart was shifted northward onto a more direct path just north of the city. US 278/SR 6 in the Powder Springs area was shifted northward, onto the former path of SR 726.

== Major intersections ==
County	Location	mi	km	Destinations	Notes
Polk		0.000	0.000	US 278 west (SR 74 west) / SR 6 begins – Piedmont	Continuation into Alabama; western terminus of SR 6; western end of SR 6 concurrency
Polk		8.219	13.227	SR 100 north (Canal Street) – Cave Spring, Summerville	Western end of SR 100 concurrency
Polk	Cedartown	9.644	15.521	US 27 Bus. / SR 1 Bus. (Main Street) – Rome, Cedartown, Buchanan	
Polk	Cedartown	11.159	17.959	US 27 south / SR 1 south / SR 100 south (Martha Berry Highway) – Buchanan, Tallapoosa	Eastern end of SR 100 concurrency; western end of US 27/SR 1 concurrency
Polk	Cedartown	12.907	20.772	US 27 north / SR 1 north (East Avenue) – Rome, Cedartown	Eastern end of US 27/SR 1 concurrency; interchange
Polk	Rockmart	21.648	34.839	US 278 Bus. east / SR 6 Bus. east (Cedartown Highway)	Western terminus of US 278 Bus./SR 6 Bus.
Polk	Rockmart	23.464	37.762	US 278 Bus. west / SR 6 Bus. west (North Piedmont Avenue) / SR 101 north – Rome, Aragon, Rockmart	Western end of SR 101 concurrency
Polk	Rockmart	24.386	39.245	SR 113 north (Cartersville Road) – Cartersville, Rockmart	Western end of SR 113 concurrency
Polk		27.186	43.752	Old Atlanta Highway – Rockmart	Former segment of US 278/SR 6/SR 101/SR 113
Polk		28.099	45.221	SR 101 south / SR 113 south – Villa Rica, Temple	Eastern end of SR 101 and SR 113 concurrencies
Paulding	Dallas	36.966	59.491	West Memorial Drive – Dallas Business District	Former segment of US 278/SR 6
Paulding	Dallas	37.685	60.648	SR 6 Bus. east / SR 120 west (Buchanan Street) – Dallas, Tallapoosa, Buchanan	Western end of SR 120 concurrency; western terminus of SR 6 Bus.
Paulding	Dallas	39.729	63.938	SR 61 (Nathan Dean Boulevard) to SR 6 Bus. – Cartersville, Dallas, Villa Rica	
Paulding	Hiram	42.482	68.368	SR 120 east / SR 360 east (Charles Hardy Parkway) – Marietta	Eastern end of SR 120 concurrency
Paulding	Hiram	42.908	69.054	SR 6 Bus. west (Atlanta Highway)	Eastern terminus of SR 6 Bus.
Paulding	Hiram	44.134	71.027	SR 92 – Hiram, Historic Downtown Hiram, Pickett's Mill Historic Site	
Douglas	Powder Springs	48.022	77.284	Richard D. Sailors Parkway – Powder Springs, Acworth	Former SR 176 and SR 6 Bus.
Douglas	Powder Springs	49.368	79.450	Brownsville Road – Powder Springs, Sun Valley Beach	
Douglas	Austell	52.372	84.285	SR 6 Spur east (Dr. Luke Glen Garrett Jr., Memorial Highway) – Norfolk Southern Railway, Austell Yard	Western terminus of SR 6 Spur
Douglas	Lithia Springs	54.203	87.231	US 78 east / SR 5 south / SR 8 east (Bankhead Highway) / SR 6 east – Austell, Lithia Springs, Douglasville	Western end of US 78, SR 5, and SR 8 concurrencies; eastern end of SR 6 concurrency
Cobb	Austell	56.213	90.466	Dr. J.A. Griffith Bridge over Sweetwater Creek	
Cobb	Austell	56.461	90.865	SR 5 north (Austell Road) / Maxham Road – Marietta	Eastern end of SR 5 concurrency; interchange
Cobb	Mableton	58.936	94.848	SR 139 east (Mableton Parkway)	Western terminus of SR 139
Cobb	Mableton	62.445	100.495	Coogan Ray Bleodow Memorial Bridge over Nickajack Creek	
Fulton	Atlanta	64.215	103.344	SR 70 south (Fulton Industrial Boulevard Northwest) – Fulton County Airport	Northern terminus of SR 70
Fulton	Atlanta	64.494	103.793	I-285 (SR 407)	I-285 exit 12
Fulton	Atlanta	65.847	105.970	SR 280 (James Jackson Parkway Northwest / Hamilton E. Holmes Drive Northwest)	No left turn westbound
Fulton	Atlanta	69.771	112.286	US 19 north / US 41 north / SR 3 north (Northside Drive Northwest)	Western end of US 19/US 41/SR 3 concurrency
Fulton	Atlanta	70.075	112.775	US 19 south / US 41 south / SR 3 south / US 29 south (Northside Drive Northwest)	Eastern end of US 19/US 41/SR 3 concurrency; western end of US 29 concurrency
Fulton	Atlanta	71.021	114.297	Spring Street Northwest to I-75 / I-85	I-75 exit 249D
Fulton	Atlanta	72.787	117.139	SR 10 west (Freedom Parkway Northeast) – Carter Center	Western end of SR 10 concurrency
Fulton–DeKalb county line	Atlanta	73.421	118.160	US 23 south (Briarcliff Road Northeast / Moreland Avenue Northeast) / SR 42	Western end of US 23 concurrency
DeKalb	Druid Hills	75.103	120.867	US 23 north / US 29 north / US 78 east / SR 8 east (Ponce de Leon Avenue N.E.)	Eastern end of US 23 and US 29/US 78/SR 8 concurrency
DeKalb	Decatur	77.468	124.673	SR 155 south (South Candler Street) / East Trinity Place north	Western end of SR 155 concurrency; southern terminus of East Trinity Place
DeKalb	Decatur	77.762	125.146	SR 155 north (Commerce Drive)	Eastern end of SR 155 concurrency
DeKalb	Avondale Estates	79.631	128.154	SR 10 east (Mountain Drive) / SR 12 begins – Stone Mountain	Eastern end of SR 10 concurrency; western terminus of SR 12; western end of SR 12 concurrency
DeKalb	Belvedere Park	80.067	128.855	SR 154 (Memorial Drive) – Atlanta, Stone Mountain	
DeKalb	Belvedere Park	80.649	129.792	SR 154 Spur west	Eastern terminus of SR 154 Spur
DeKalb		81.772	131.599	I-285 (Atlanta Bypass / SR 407) – Augusta, Greenville	I-285 exit 43
DeKalb	Lithonia	91.246	146.846	SR 124 north (Turner Hill Road) – Snellville	Northern end of SR 124 concurrency
DeKalb	Lithonia	91.386	147.072	I-20 west (SR 402) / SR 124 ends – Atlanta	Southern end of SR 124 concurrency; southern terminus of SR 124; western end of I-20 concurrency; I-20 exit 75
see I-20 (exit 75–90)
Newton	Covington	105.168	169.251	I-20 east (SR 402) – Augusta	Eastern end of I-20 concurrency, I-20 exit 90
Newton	Covington	106.668	171.666	SR 81 – Loganville, Porterdale	
Newton	Covington	108.456	174.543	SR 142 north / SR 36 ends	Western end of SR 142 concurrency; eastern terminus of SR 36
Newton		110.897	178.471	SR 142 south – Newborn	Eastern end of SR 142 concurrency
Newton	Hub Junction	113.499	182.659	SR 11 – Social Circle, Mansfield	
Newton	Hub Junction	113.688	182.963	CR 229 south – Newborn	Former SR 229 south
Newton–Walton county line	Social Circle	116.544	187.559	I-20 (SR 402) – Atlanta, Augusta	I-20 exit 101
Walton		118.893	191.340	Hightower Trail north – Social Circle	Former SR 229 north
Morgan	Madison	129.747	208.808	SR 83 south (Monticello Road) – Shady Dale, Monticello	Western end of SR 83 concurrency
Morgan	Madison	130.152	209.459	SR 24 Spur south / US 278 Truck east / SR 12 Truck east – Eatonton	Northern terminus of SR 24 Spur; western terminus of US 278 Truck/SR 12 Truck
Morgan	Madison	130.573	210.137	US 129 south / US 441 south / SR 24 south – Eatonton	Western end of US 129/US 441/SR 24 concurrency
Morgan	Madison	131.412	211.487	SR 83 north (Washington Street) – Bostwick, Monroe	Eastern end of SR 83 concurrency
Morgan		132.823	213.758	US 129 north / US 441 north / SR 24 north / US 129 Byp. south / US 441 Byp. south / SR 24 Byp. south / US 278 Truck west / SR 12 Truck west – Apalachee, Athens, Eatonton	Eastern end of US 129/US 441/SR 24 concurrency; northern terminus of US 129 Byp./US 441 Byp./SR 24 Byp.; eastern terminus of US 278 Truck/SR 12 Truck
Greene	Greensboro	150.059	241.497	SR 15 north (Laurel Avenue) – Watkinsville	Western end of SR 15 concurrency
Greene	Greensboro	150.379	242.012	SR 44 south (South Main Street) – Eatonton	Western end of SR 44 concurrency
Greene	Greensboro	150.623	242.404	SR 15 south (Siloam Road) – Sparta	Eastern end of SR 15 concurrency
Greene	Union Point	157.283	253.122	SR 44 north / SR 77 north – Washington, Woodville	Eastern end of SR 44 concurrency; western end of SR 77 concurrency
Greene	Union Point	157.618	253.662	SR 77 south (Moody Street) – Siloam	Eastern end of SR 77 concurrency
Taliaferro	Crawfordville	168.141	270.597	SR 22 (Alexander Street) – Lexington, Sparta	
Taliaferro	Crawfordville	169.343	272.531	SR 47 north (Sharon Street) – Sharon	Southern terminus of SR 47
Taliaferro–Warren county line		174.635	281.048	Warrenton Road – Sharon	Former SR 269 north
Warren	Barnett	176.307	283.739	I-20 (Carl Sanders Highway / SR 402) – Augusta, Atlanta	I-20 exit 154
Warren	Warrenton	187.225	301.309	US 278 Byp. east / SR 12 Byp. east (Legion Drive) – Thomson	Western terminus of US 278 Byp./SR 12 Byp.
Warren	Warrenton	187.560	301.849	SR 16 west – Sparta	Eastern terminus of SR 16
Warren	Warrenton	188.307	303.051	US 278 Byp. west / SR 12 Byp. west / SR 80 Alt. begins / SR 80 (Legion Drive) to I-20 / SR 171 – Wrens, Macon, Gibson	Western end of SR 80 Alt. concurrency; eastern terminus of US 278 Byp./SR 12 Byp.; southern terminus of SR 80 Alt.
Warren		189.383	304.782	SR 80 Alt. north (VFW Road) to I-20 – Camak, Washington	Eastern end of SR 80 Alt. concurrency
McDuffie		196.063	315.533	Wire Road	Interchange
McDuffie	Thomson	198.279	319.099	SR 17 (Jackson Street) to I-20 – Washington, Dearing, Wrens	Former western end of US 78 concurrency
McDuffie		199.680	321.354	US 78 west / SR 10 west / SR 17 Byp. (Thomson Bypass) / SR 12 ends – Thomson, Warrenton, Wrens	Eastern end of SR 12 concurrency; western end of US 78/SR 10 concurrency; eastern terminus of SR 12
Columbia	Harlem	210.736	339.147	US 221 / SR 47 (North Louisville Street) to I-20 – Appling, Wrens	
Richmond	Augusta	219.587	353.391	SR 223 west (Robinson Avenue) – Grovetown, Fort Gordon Recreation Area, Fort Gordon Gate 2, United States Army Signal Corps Museum	Eastern terminus of SR 223
Richmond	Augusta	223.004	358.890	SR 383 north (Jimmie Dyess Parkway) to I-20 – Fort Gordon, United States Army Signal Corps Museum	Southern terminus of SR 383
Richmond	Augusta	225.712	363.248	I-520 (Bobby Jones Expressway / SR 415) to I-20 – Columbia, Atlanta, Bush Field	I-520 exit 3
Richmond	Augusta	229.044	368.611	US 1 south / SR 4 (Deans Bridge Road) – Augusta, Wrens, Louisville	Western end of US 1 concurrency
Richmond	Augusta	230.272	370.587	US 25 south / SR 121 south (Peach Orchard Road) – Waynesboro	Western end of US 25 and SR 121 concurrencies; interchange
Richmond	Augusta	231.577	372.687	Molly Pond Road north / Doug Barnard Parkway south – Augusta Regional Airport	Southern terminus of Molly Pond Road; northern terminus of Doug Barnard Parkway; former SR 56 Spur south
Richmond	Augusta	234.098	376.744	US 25 Bus. north / SR 28 (Broad Street) – Downtown Augusta, Fort Discovery	Interchange; southern terminus of US 25 Bus.; also serves Bay Street; eastbound lanes have access via Bay Street.
Richmond	Augusta	234.352	377.153	US 1 north / US 25 north / US 78 east / US 278 east / SC 121 north / SR 10 ends – Columbia	South Carolina state line (Savannah River bridge; eastern end of SR 10 concurrency; eastern terminus of SR 10; SR 121 continues as SC 121 at the state line)
1.000 mi = 1.609 km; 1.000 km = 0.621 mi: Concurrency terminus; Incomplete access

== Special routes ==
Three special routes of US 278 exist in the state of Georgia. A business route in Rockmart, a truck route in Madison, and a truck bypass in Warrenton.

== See also ==
U.S. Route 278
Previous state: Alabama	Georgia	Next state: South Carolina
