= D'Anthony Bell =

American football player (born 1996)

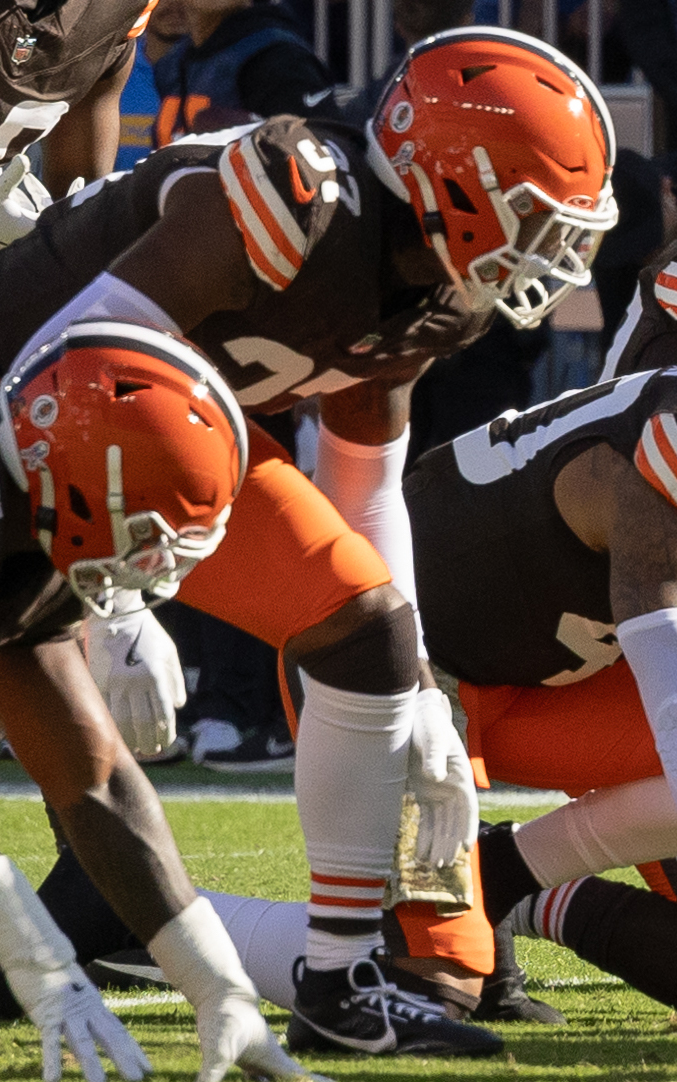
- Bell with the Cleveland Browns in 2024

No. 37 – Minnesota Vikings
- Position: Safety
- Roster status: Practice squad

Personal information
- Born: October 17, 1996 (age 30); Covington, Georgia, U.S.
- Listed height: 6 ft 1 in (1.85 m)
- Listed weight: 211 lb (96 kg)

Career information
- High school: Alcovy (Covington)
- College: Albany State (2015); Iowa Central (2016); Butler (KS) (2018); West Florida (2019–2021)
- NFL draft: 2022: undrafted

Career history
- Cleveland Browns (2022–2024); Seattle Seahawks (2025); Carolina Panthers (2025); Seattle Seahawks (2026)*; Minnesota Vikings (2026–present)*
- * Offseason or practice squad member only

Career NFL statistics as of 2026
- Total tackles: 76
- Sacks: 0.5
- Pass deflections: 4
- Interceptions: 2
- Forced fumbles: 1
- Stats at Pro Football Reference

D'Anthony Bell (born October 17, 1996) is an American professional football safety for the Minnesota Vikings of the National Football League (NFL). He played college football for the Albany State Golden Rams, Iowa Central Tritons, Butler Grizzlies and the West Florida Argonauts.

== Professional career ==
Pre-draft measurables
Height	Weight	Arm length	Hand span	Wingspan	40-yard dash	10-yard split	20-yard split	20-yard shuttle	Three-cone drill	Vertical jump	Broad jump	Bench press
6 ft 0 5/8 in (1.84 m)	211 lb (96 kg)	32 1/8 in (0.82 m)	9 in (0.23 m)	6 ft 3 in (1.91 m)	4.51 s	1.61 s	2.63 s	4.27 s	6.94 s	36.0 in (0.91 m)	10 ft 9 in (3.28 m)	18 reps
All values from Pro Day

=== Cleveland Browns ===
On April 30, 2022, Bell signed with the Cleveland Browns as an undrafted free agent, following the 2022 NFL draft. He made the Browns' 53-man final roster out of training camp and became the first player from West Florida to make it to the NFL.

In Week 15 of the 2023 season against the Chicago Bears, Bell intercepted Justin Fields' Hail Mary pass in the end zone to secure a 20–17 win for the Browns. The ball got tipped multiple times in the end zone, ending in wide receiver Darnell Mooney's hands as he was falling to the ground; however, Mooney was unable to secure the pass and kicked it straight into Bell's hands. In the following game against the Houston Texans, Bell stepped in to perform a kickoff due to Dustin Hopkins and Corey Bojorquez becoming injured during the game. As the kicker on the play, Bell tackled the returner.

In the 2024 season, Bell appeared in 17 games, including one start.

=== Seattle Seahawks (first stint) ===
On March 24, 2025, Bell signed a one-year contract with the Seattle Seahawks. On August 28, he was waived from the initial 53-man roster by the Seahawks and re-signed to the practice squad on September 1. Bell was elevated on September 13, and made his first regular season appearance with the Seahawks in Week 2 against the Pittsburgh Steelers. In the following game against the New Orleans Saints, Bell blocked a punt to set up a touchdown for the Seahawks. On September 24, he was signed to the active roster. In 14 appearances (two starts) for Seattle, Bell logged 0.5 sacks and 15 combined tackles. Bell was waived by the Seahawks on December 30.

=== Carolina Panthers ===
On December 31, 2025, Bell was claimed off waivers by the Carolina Panthers.

=== Seattle Seahawks (second stint) ===
On March 24, 2026, Bell signed with the Seattle Seahawks. Upon returning, it was reported that the Seahawks, who had won Super Bowl LX after Bell had been claimed by Carolina, would present Bell with a Super Bowl ring even though he had not been on the team for the game in recognition of his contributions throughout the season. On August 30, he was released by Seattle as a part of final roster cuts. Bell was re-signed to the team's practice squad on September 5, and was released again on September 30.

=== Minnesota Vikings ===
On November 17, 2026, Bell signed to the Minnesota Vikings practice squad.
