= Alcovy High School =

Location
- 14517 Highway 36; Covington, Georgia; United States; 33°27′29.1794″N 83°50′38.1505″W

Information
- Type: Public
- Established: 2006
- School district: Newton County School System
- Principal: Michael Chapple
- Teaching staff: 99.10 (FTE)
- Grades: 9 to 12
- Enrollment: 2,039 (2023–2024)
- Student to teacher ratio: 20.58
- Colors: Black and gold
- Mascot: Tigers
- Website: ahs.newtoncountyschools.org

Alcovy High School is a public school in Covington, Georgia, United States. It is part of the Newton County School System.

== History ==
Alcovy High School opened to serve grades 9 to 12 in the 2006–2007 school year. The school was built to relieve the population of Newton High School and Eastside High School. The school was built with 82 classrooms, and it has room to accommodate up to 2,500 students.

The class schedule originally was six periods. In 2009, the Newton County School System changed all high schools to a four-block schedule. In 2011, it changed all high schools to a six-period schedule, which changed graduation credit requirements starting with the class of 2012. In 2008, the school added classrooms and a Ninth Grade Academy, which opened in the fall of 2010. The class of 2014 was the first to use it.

In 2010, the school was rezoned and students from Newton High School were transferred to Alcovy so that the school system could change Newton into housing for STEM students going to the career academy in 2013. Another building was added for Newton.

Alcovy's first graduating class was the class of 2007.

In 2009, Alcovy High served as a filming location for Rob Zombie's Halloween II, as the exterior of a hospital.

In 2011, the school hosted WAGA-TV's "High Five Field Trip" on the Fox 5 Morning News.

== Sports ==
- Football
- Basketball (men's and women's)
- Cheerleading (Tiger Hybrid Cheer)
- Dance (Golden Diamonds)
- Softball
- Golf
- Baseball
- Cross country
- Track & field
- Volleyball
- Wrestling
- Soccer (men's and women's)
- Tennis
- Swimming

== Notable alumni ==
- D'Anthony Bell - NFL - Cleveland Browns #37
- Drew Parker (musician) - Country Music Singer/Songwriter
