= Georgia State Route 155 =

State highway in Georgia, United States

State Route 155
- Georgia State Route 155 highlighted in red

Route information
- Maintained by GDOT
- Length: 57.2 mi (92.1 km)

Major junctions
- South end: US 19 / US 19 Bus. / US 41 / US 41 Bus. / SR 3 / SR 7 south of Griffin
- I-75 southwest of McDonough; US 23 / SR 42 in McDonough; I-285 in Panthersville; I-20 in Panthersville; US 278 / SR 10 in Decatur; US 23 / US 29 / US 78 / SR 8 in Decatur; I-85 on North Druid Hills–Brookhaven line
- North end: US 23 / SR 13 in Brookhaven

Location
- Country: United States
- State: Georgia
- Counties: Spalding, Henry, Rockdale, DeKalb

Highway system
- Georgia State Highway System; Interstate; US; State; Special
← SR 154	→ SR 156

State Route 155 (SR 155) is a 57.2-mile-long (92.1 km) state highway that travels south-to-north through portions of Spalding, Henry, Rockdale, and DeKalb counties in the north-central part of the U.S. state of Georgia.

== Route description ==
=== Spalding County ===
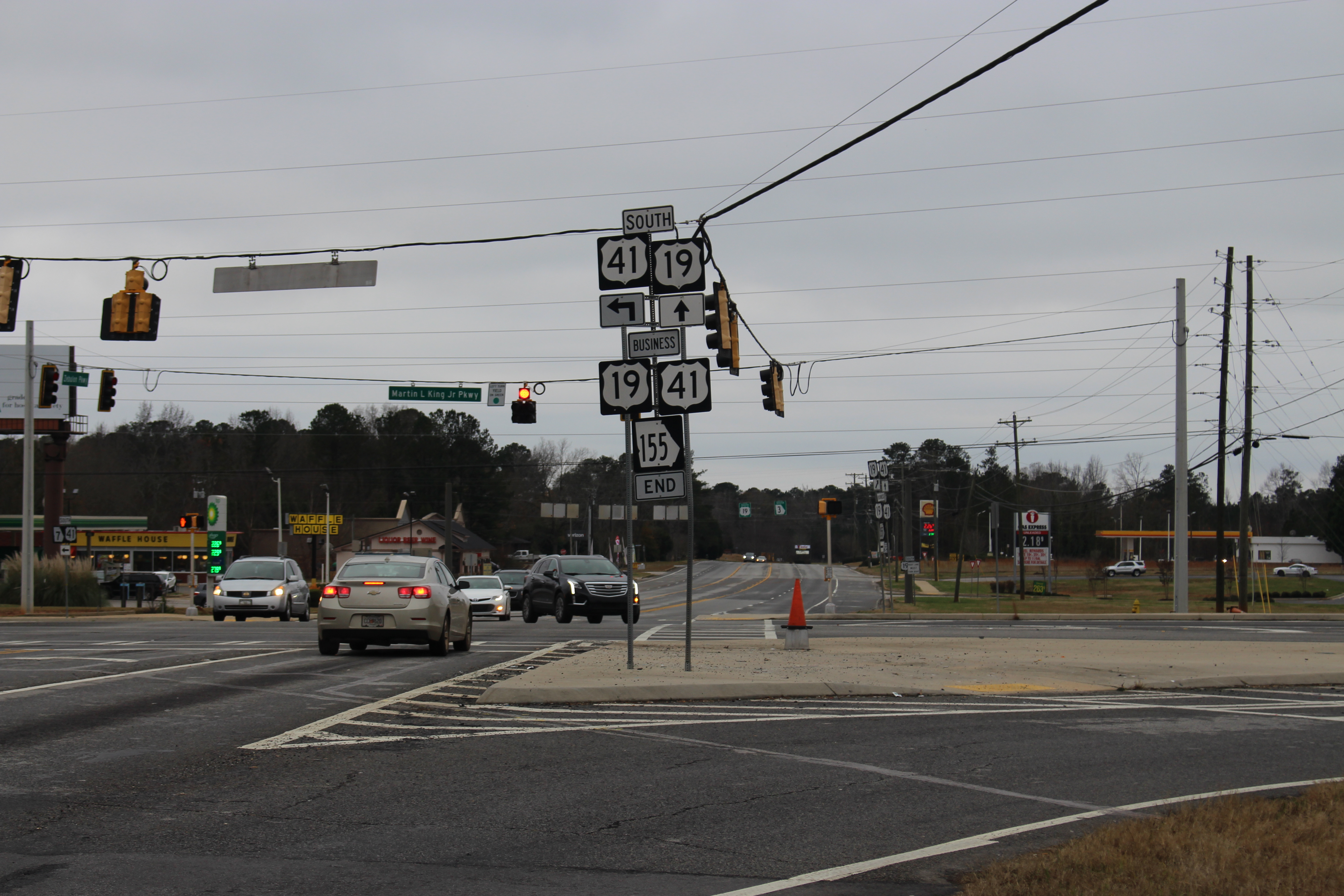
Southern terminus in Griffin

SR 155 begins at an intersection with US 19/US 41/SR 3/SR 7 south of Griffin, in Spalding County. This also marks the southern terminus of US 19 Bus./US 41 Bus., which travel concurrently with SR 155 to the northeast to an intersection with SR 16 in the central part of the city. They cross a Norfolk Southern Railway until SR 155 departs to the east. It heads northeast, and turns north on McDonough Road. It heads northward and enters Henry County.

=== Henry and Rockdale Counties ===
SR 155 meets Interstate 75 (I-75), just before it enters McDonough. In the city, it intersects US 23/SR 42. In the main part of the city is SR 20. The two highways travel concurrently for about a block. Then, SR 81 travels concurrent with it for a short distance. SR 155 departs to the north, and intersects SR 138 just before it reaches the Henry–Rockdale county line. It travels along the county line until just past Panola Mountain State Park, where it re-enters Henry County for a short distance. After that, it enters DeKalb County.

=== DeKalb County ===
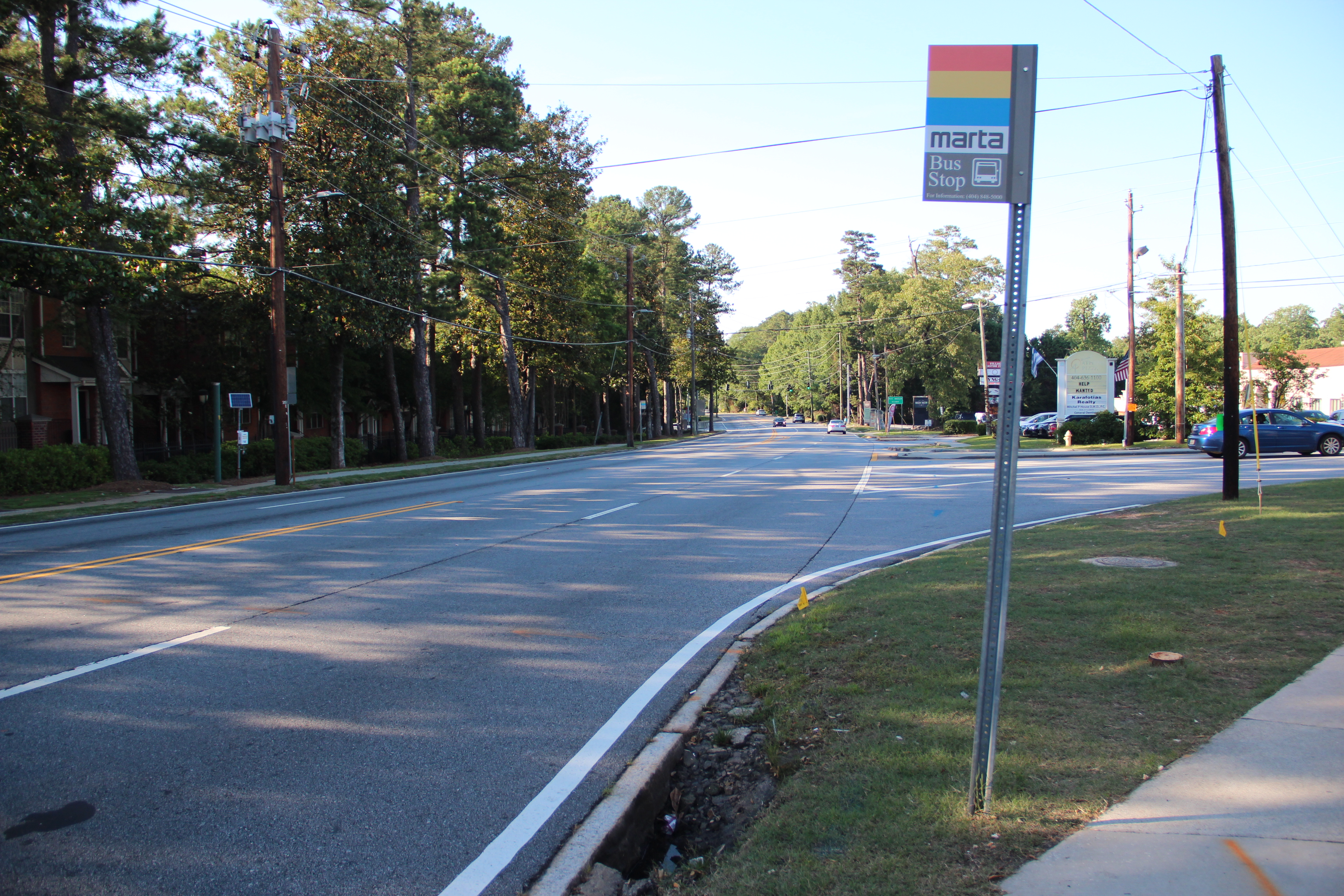
Georgia State Route 155 in North Decatur

SR 155 continues to the north-northwest to Snapfinger and turns west on Flat Shoals Parkway. It curves to the northwest and has an interchange with I-285 on the southeastern edge of Panthersville. The highway heads through Panthersville and meets I-20 on the northeast edge of it. In the East Lake neighborhood, it intersects SR 154. In Decatur, it has a brief concurrency with US 278/SR 10. In the northwest part of Decatur is US 23/US 29/SR 8. East of North Druid Hills is an intersection with SR 236. On the North Druid Hills–Brookhaven city line is an interchange with I-85. SR 155 curves to the northeast to meet its northern terminus, an intersection with US 23/SR 13, south of Chamblee.

== Major intersections ==
State Routes 20, 42, 81, and 155 in McDonough

County	Location	mi	km	Destinations	Notes
Spalding		0.0	0.0	US 19 / US 41 / SR 3 / SR 7 south (Martin L. King Jr. Parkway) / US 19 Bus. begins / US 41 Bus. begins (Zebulon Parkway) – Zebulon, Barnesville, Jonesboro	Southern terminus of US 19 Bus./US 41 Bus./SR 155; northern terminus of SR 7; south end of US 19 Bus./US 41 Bus. concurrency
Spalding	Griffin	4.0	6.4	US 19 Bus. north / US 41 Bus. north / SR 16 (Taylor Street)	North end of US 19 Bus./US 41 Bus. concurrency
Henry		18.6	29.9	I-75 (SR 401) – Macon, Atlanta	I-75 exit 216
Henry	McDonough	20.3	32.7	US 23 / SR 42 (Macon Street) – Jackson, Atlanta	
Henry	McDonough	21.9	35.2	SR 20 east / SR 81 east (Keys Ferry Street) – Conyers, Covington	
Henry	McDonough	22.0	35.4	SR 20 east / SR 81 east (John Frank Ward Boulevard) – Conyers, Covington	South end of SR 20/SR 81 concurrency
Henry	McDonough	22.2	35.7	SR 20 west / SR 81 west (John Frank Ward Boulevard) – Stockbridge, Lovejoy	North end of SR 20/SR 81 concurrency
Henry		32.1	51.7	SR 138 – Stockbridge, Conyers	
DeKalb		39.5	63.6	SR 212 south (Browns Mill Road) – Monticello	Northern terminus of SR 212
DeKalb	Panthersville	44.5	71.6	I-285 (Atlanta Bypass / SR 407) Montgomery Augusta	I-285 exit 48
DeKalb	Panthersville	45.7	73.5	I-20 (Ralph David Abernathy Freeway /SR 402) – Atlanta, Augusta	I-20 exit 65
DeKalb	East Lake	48.3	77.7	SR 154 (Memorial Drive SE) – Atlanta, Stone Mountain	
DeKalb	Decatur	50.0	80.5	US 278 west / SR 10 west (East College Avenue) – Atlanta	South end of US 278/SR 10 concurrency
DeKalb	Decatur	50.3	81.0	US 278 east / SR 10 east (East College Avenue) – Avondale Estates, Lithonia	North end of US 278/SR 10 concurrency
DeKalb	Decatur	51.8	83.4	US 23 south / US 29 / US 78 / SR 8 (Scott Boulevard) – Atlanta, Stone Mountain	South end of US 23 concurrency
DeKalb		54.4	87.5	SR 236 (Lavista Road) – Atlanta, Tucker, Snellville	
DeKalb	North Druid Hills–Brookhaven line	55.9	90.0	I-85 (Northeast Expressway / SR 403) – Atlanta, Greenville	I-85 exit 91
DeKalb	Brookhaven	57.2	92.1	US 23 north / SR 13 (Buford Highway NE) – Atlanta, Chamblee	Northern terminus; north end of US 23 concurrency
1.000 mi = 1.609 km; 1.000 km = 0.621 mi: Concurrency terminus
