= Newton County School System =

School district in Georgia, United States

Newton County School District

Address
- 2109 Newton Drive Northeast Covington, Georgia, 30014-2459; United States
- Coordinates: 33.598768°N 83.854688°W

District information
- Grades: Pre-kindergarten – 12
- Accreditation(s): Southern Association of Colleges and Schools; Georgia Accrediting Commission

Students and staff
- Enrollment: 18,661 (2022–23)
- Faculty: 1,152.50 (FTE)
- Student–teacher ratio: 16.19

Other information
- Telephone: (770) 787-1330
- Website: newtoncountyschools.org

The Newton County Schools System is a public school district in Newton County, Georgia, United States, based in Covington.

It includes all areas of the county except for areas in Social Circle; portions in Social Circle are in the Social Circle City School District. It serves the communities of Covington, Mansfield, Newborn, Oxford, and Porterdale.

== Schools ==
=== Elementary schools ===
- East Newton Elementary School
- Farview Elementary School
- Flint Hill Elementary School
- Heard-Mixon Elementary School
- Live Oak Elementary School
- Livingston Elementary School
- Mansfield Elementary School
- Middle Ridge Elementary School
- Oak Hill Elementary School
- Porterdale Elementary School
- Rocky Plains Elementary School
- South Salem Elementary School
- West Newton Elementary School

=== Middle schools ===
- Cousins Middle School
- Clements Middle School
- Indian Creek Middle School
- Veterans Memorial Middle School
- Liberty Middle School

=== High schools ===
- Alcovy High School
- Eastside High School
- Newton High School

=== Non-Traditional Schools ===
- Newton County STEAM Academy
- Newton College and Career Academy

=== Alternative school ===
- Rise Academy
