= Fort Yargo State Park =

State park in Georgia, United States

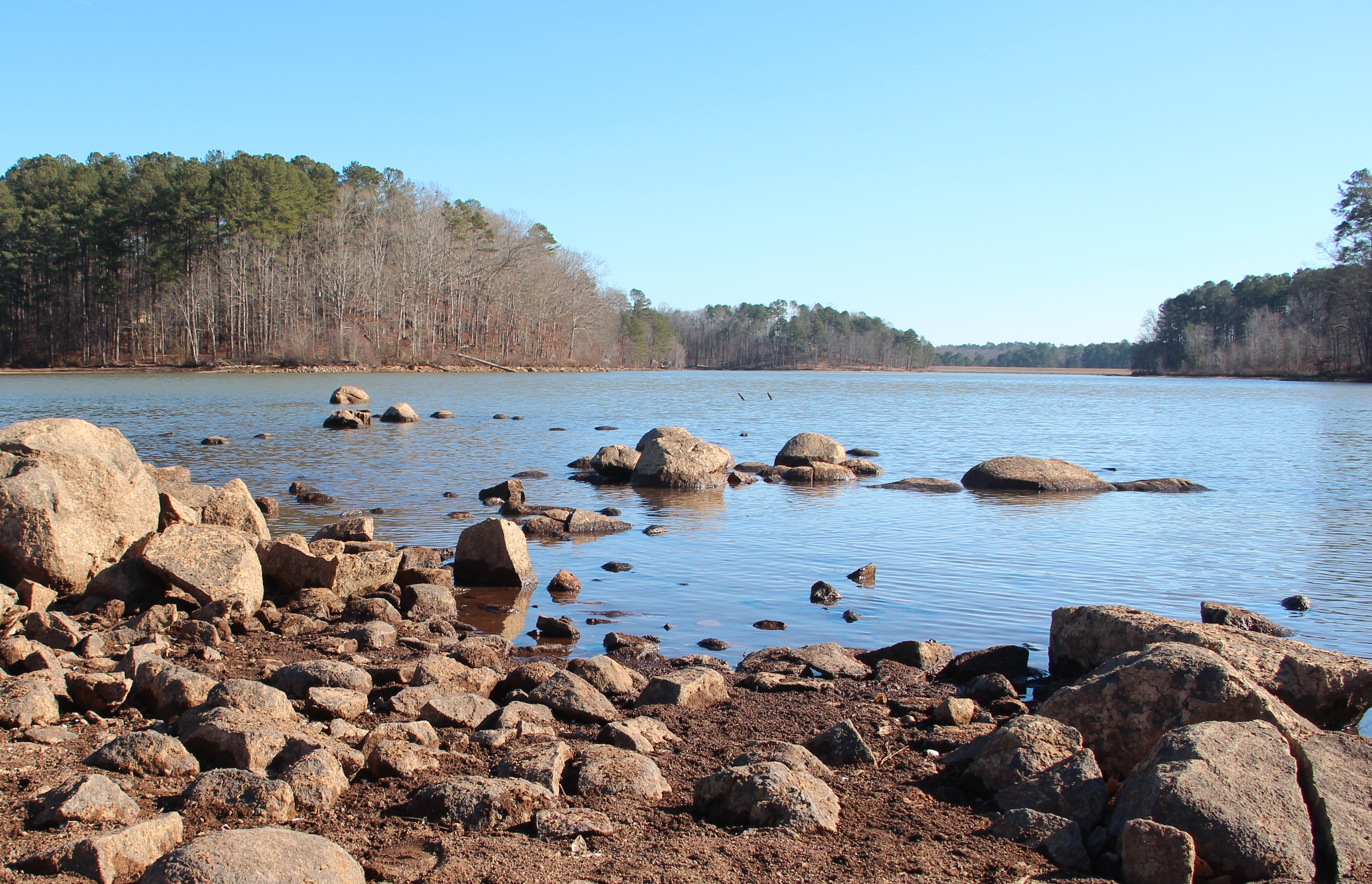

- Location within Georgia Location within the United States
- Location: Barrow County, Georgia, US
- Nearest city: Winder, Georgia
- Coordinates: 33°58′11″N 83°43′47″W
- Area: 1,816 acres (7.35 km^{2})
- Governing body: Georgia State Park

Fort Yargo State Park is a 1,816-acre (7.35 km^{2}) U.S. state park located in Winder, Georgia, situated between Athens and Atlanta. The park is located 1 mile south of Winder and is accessible by Georgia State Route 81. There is a 260-acre (1.1 km^{2}) lake with a public beach. Available activities at Fort Yargo include GeoCaching, hiking, mountain biking, disc golf, boating (including johnboat, pedal boat, and canoe rentals), lake swimming, fishing, picnicking, and miniature golf. The park also features a log fort built in 1792 by settlers, for protection against the Creek and Cherokee.

The park also hosts Camp Will-A-Way, an accessible camp designed for individuals with developmental disabilities, in partnership with Camp Twin Lakes.

== History ==
The Creek village known as Snodon was located near what is now Athens and Church streets in Winder. A Creek named Umausauga claimed an area south of Tishmagu, now called Mulberry River. In 1786, three men – Abednego Moore, Richard Easley, and Josiah Strong - arrived from Effingham County. They set up camp north of the Mulberry River in hopes of trading beads and cloth. The three men formed a friendship with Umasauga, who allowed the men to purchase some of his land which they called Beadland. The day after the trade nine friends and family joined the three men. They brought four horses, two wagons, four head of cattle, four sheep, six pigs, ten new rifles with powder and shot and tools. The new colony now had eight men and four women, six of whom had fought in the American Revolution.

The State of Georgia contracted with the Humphries brothers – George, Shadrack, and Uriah, the three sons of Revolutionary War captain and Jackson County delegate to 1798 Georgia Constitutional Convention, Joseph Humphries – to build four forts across Georgia. Fort Yargo was constructed in 1793. Its location was given as three miles SW of "Jug Tavern," the original name for Winder. The other three forts are Fort Strong at Talassee, Fort Thomocoggan now Jefferson, and Fort Groaning Rock now Commerce.

In 1810, George Washington Humphrey, an original builder of the Fort, sold Fort Yargo and 121 surrounding acres at auction to John Hill for $167.00. John Hill and his family lived on the property for a number of years. The family cemetery is located in the Fort Yargo State Park.

In the year 1927, the Daughters of the American Revolution (DAR) took on the project to restore and preserve Fort Yargo. Mildred Pledger and the DAR placed a marker on the grounds which was later destroyed. Led by C.O. Maddox, members of the Kiwanis Club and the Lions Club set out to preserve the fort. With the help of Senator Richard B. Russell, Jr. in 1954, 1,497-acre (6.06 km^{2}) were donated to the state. Other lands were acquired to bring the acreage count to 1,814-acre (7.34 km^{2}).

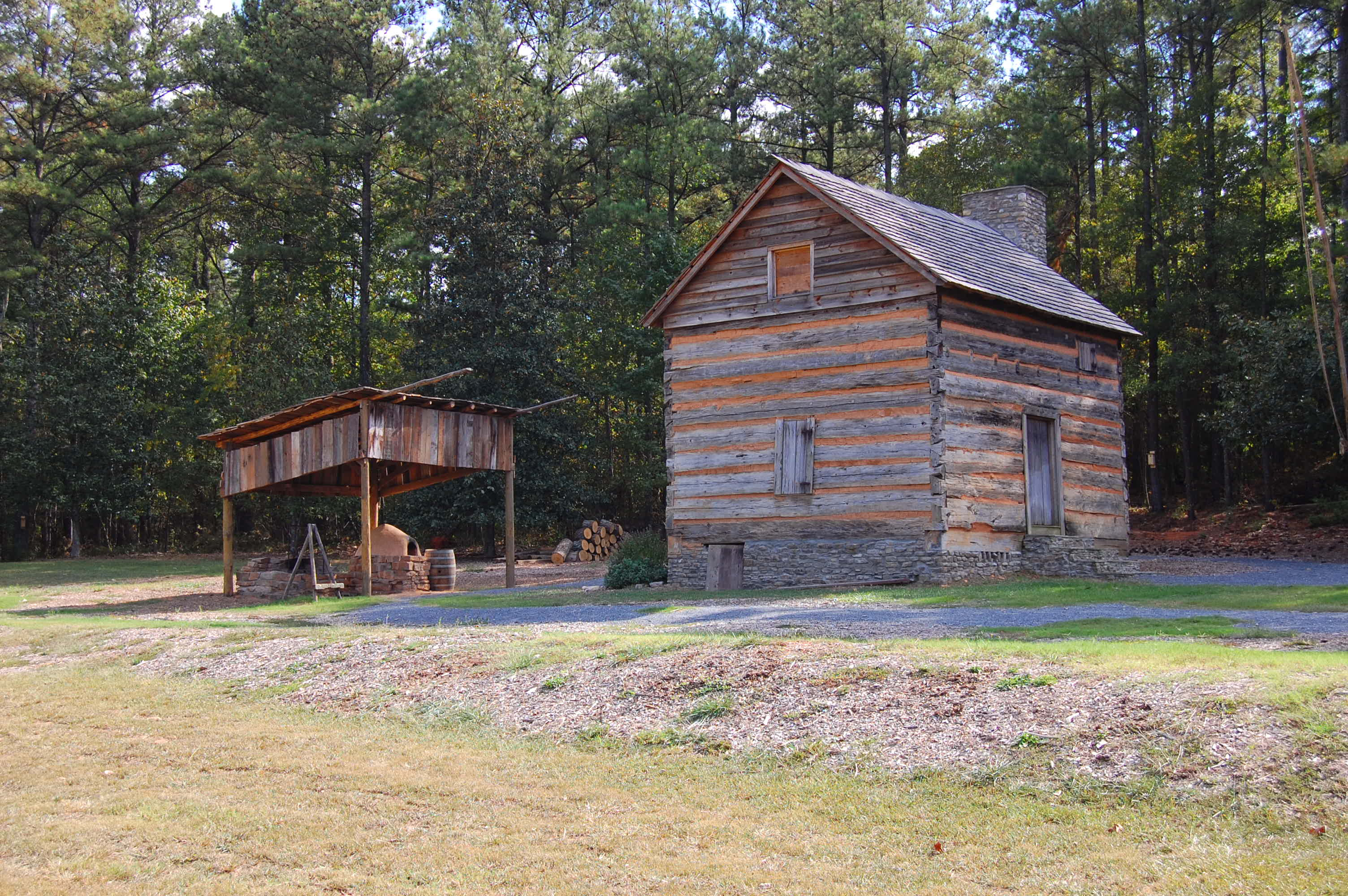
Old Fort Yargo

The Fort Yargo building, constructed as part of the original Fort, is an 18 by 22 feet (5.5 m × 6.7 m) two-story log blockhouse. The logs used to construct the Fort are around 10 inches thick and are joined at the corners by interlocking wedge shaped notches. Local citizens and the Fort Yargo Living History Society are working today to restore Fort Yargo and some out buildings. Scheduled living history dates provide visitors with a chance to learn more about the history of the site.

=== Camp Will-A-Way ===
Camp Will-A-Way is provided by Camp Twin Lakes and the Georgia Department of Natural Resources. Opened in 1971 and renovated in 2009, the camp provides a 250-bed camping facility to provide for the special needs population.

=== Facilities ===
- 38 Tent/Trailer/RV Sites
- 12 Walk-In Campsites
- 5 Picnic Shelters
- 13 Adventure Cabins
- 3 Cottages
- 2 Group Shelters
- 6 Yurts
- Pioneer Campground
- Beach Pavilion
- 2 Boat ramps
- Miniature Golf Course
- Disc golf course
- Volleyball court
- 260 acre Lake and Beach
- Hiking & Biking trails
