= Lizzie Wilkerson =

American folk artist

Lizzie Wilkerson (1895–1984) was an American folk artist known for paintings that reflected her life on a farm.

== Biography ==
She was born Lizzie Henderson near Covington, Georgia, the youngest of 21 children. In 1919, she married Dewey Wilkerson, a mechanic, and moved to Atlanta. She never received formal training as an artist and began making art late in life. She worked in watercolor and pen, creating imaginatively detailed and expansive images in which elements of farm life fill the page, often creating an all-over effect reminiscent of textile patterns. She also made some dolls.

Wilkerson's work was little known until the late 1970s, when it surfaced through a Georgia State University community outreach program. Wilkerson then had a number of shows in Atlanta and elsewhere, and her work has since been collected by museums and institutions including the Museum of American Folk Art (New York), the National Museum of American Art (Washington, D.C.), and the High Museum of Art (Atlanta, Ga.).

Architect Earnest Hooks Jr. wrote a book that focuses on Wilkerson's life on her family farm and uses her artwork as illustrations. Let's Go See Mother Wilkerson's Farm (2007) is intended for very young children unfamiliar with American farm culture. A second volume came out in 2011.
