= Newton County, Georgia =

County in Georgia, United States

- County
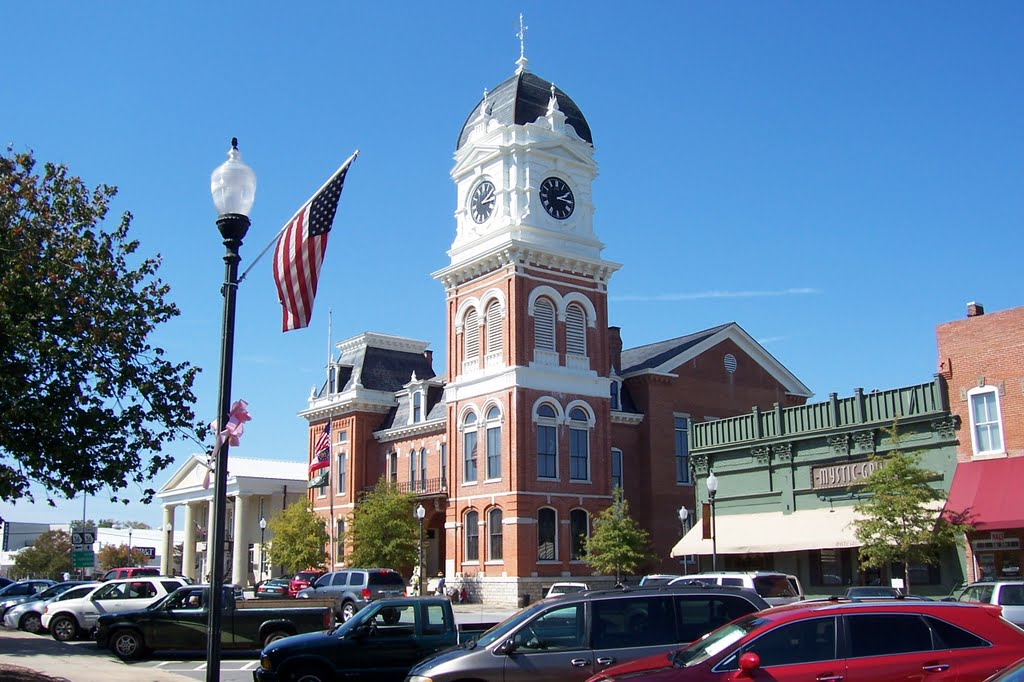
- Newton County Courthouse

- Flag Seal

- Location within the U.S. state of Georgia
- Coordinates: 33°35′57″N 83°51′31″W
- Country: United States
- State: Georgia
- Founded: December 24, 1821; 204 years ago
- Named for: John Newton
- Seat: Covington
- Largest city: Covington

Area
  - Total: 279 sq mi (720 km^{2})
  - Land: 272 sq mi (700 km^{2})
  - Water: 7.0 sq mi (18 km^{2}) 2.5%

Population (2020)
  - Total: 112,483
  - Estimate (2025): 125,583 ▲
  - Density: 414/sq mi (160/km^{2})
- Time zone: UTC−5 (Eastern)
  - Summer (DST): UTC−4 (EDT)
- Congressional districts: 13th, 10th
- Website: www.newtoncountyga.gov

Newton County is a county located in the East Central region of the U.S. state of Georgia. As of the 2020 census, the population was 112,483. The county seat is Covington. Newton County is included in the Atlanta-Sandy Springs-Roswell MSA.

== History ==
Newton county is named after Sgt. John Newton, who served under Gen. Francis Marion, the "Swamp Fox", in the American Revolutionary War. It was created on December 24, 1821.

During the American Civil War, the county provided the Lamar Infantry, which was a part of Cobb's Legion. The 1860 census shows the enslaved population was nearly half, 45.2 percent. Newton County adjoins Jasper County: Georgia is one of many states that have a Newton County and a Jasper County that border each other.

In late 1978, the first five episodes of The Dukes of Hazzard were filmed in and around Covington, Georgia. The TV series In The Heat of the Night was filmed in Covington from 1988 to 1995. Also, in Remember the Titans, there were many scenes shot on "The Square" and the final football scene was shot at Homer Sharp Stadium, which is located near downtown Covington. Currently part of the new series The Vampire Diaries is being filmed on "The Square". Additionally, major films including My Cousin Vinny, Friday the 13th Part VI: Jason Lives and Halloween II, Rob Zombie's sequel to his 2007 film Halloween, were also filmed near and around "The Square" in downtown Covington.

Newton County claims to be the birthplace of Georgia 4-H. Actually, the Girls Canning and Boys Corn Clubs in 1904 by G.C. Adams was renamed the 4-H Club in 1906, after the original 4-H Club that opened in Iowa in 1905.

== Geography ==
According to the U.S. Census Bureau, the county has a total area of 279 square miles (720 km^{2}), of which 272 square miles (700 km^{2}) is land and 7.0 square miles (18 km^{2}) (2.5%) is water. The county is located in the Piedmont region of the state.

The majority of Newton County is located in the Upper Ocmulgee River sub-basin of the Altamaha River basin. A small eastern portion of the county, from southwest of Social Circle to southwest of Newborn, is located in the Upper Oconee River sub-basin of the same Altamaha River basin.

=== Major highways ===
- I-20 / SR 402 (unsigned)
- US 278 / SR 12
- SR 11
- SR 20
- SR 36
- SR 81
- SR 138
- SR 142
- SR 162
  - SR 162 Conn. (Porterdale)
- SR 212

=== Adjacent counties ===
- Walton County (north)
- Morgan County (east)
- Jasper County (southeast)
- Butts County (south)
- Henry County (southwest)
- Rockdale County (northwest)

== Communities ==
=== Cities ===
- Covington (county seat)
- Mansfield
- Oxford
- Porterdale
- Social Circle

=== Towns ===
- Newborn

=== Unincorporated community ===
- Starrsville

== Demographics ==
Historical population
Census	Pop.	Note	%±
1830	11,155		—
1840	11,628		4.2%
1850	13,296		14.3%
1860	14,320		7.7%
1870	14,615		2.1%
1880	13,623		−6.8%
1890	14,310		5.0%
1900	16,734		16.9%
1910	18,449		10.2%
1920	21,680		17.5%
1930	17,290		−20.2%
1940	18,576		7.4%
1950	20,185		8.7%
1960	20,999		4.0%
1970	26,282		25.2%
1980	34,489		31.2%
1990	41,808		21.2%
2000	62,001		48.3%
2010	99,958		61.2%
2020	112,483		12.5%
2025 (est.)	125,583	▲	11.6%
U.S. Decennial Census; 1790–1880 1890–1910; 1920–1930 1930–1940; 1940–1950 1960–1980; 1980–2000 2010 2020

=== Racial and ethnic composition ===
Newton County, Georgia – Racial and ethnic composition Note: the US Census treats Hispanic/Latino as an ethnic category. This table excludes Latinos from the racial categories and assigns them to a separate category. Hispanics/Latinos may be of any race.
Race / Ethnicity (NH = Non-Hispanic)	Pop 1980	Pop 1990	Pop 2000	Pop 2010	Pop 2020	% 1980	% 1990	% 2000	% 2010	% 2020
White alone (NH)	25,467	31,936	46,007	51,995	46,746	73.84%	76.39%	74.20%	52.02%	41.56%
Black or African American alone (NH)	8,706	9,286	13,690	40,371	52,246	25.24%	22.21%	22.08%	40.39%	46.45%
Native American or Alaska Native alone (NH)	33	89	131	199	175	0.10%	0.21%	0.21%	0.20%	0.16%
Asian alone (NH)	45	98	444	881	1,044	0.13%	0.23%	0.72%	0.88%	0.93%
Native Hawaiian or Pacific Islander alone (NH)	x	x	9	34	114	x	x	0.01%	0.03%	0.10%
Other race alone (NH)	8	9	70	169	734	0.02%	0.02%	0.11%	0.17%	0.65%
Mixed race or Multiracial (NH)	x	x	493	1,674	4,260	x	x	0.80%	1.67%	3.79%
Hispanic or Latino (any race)	230	390	1,157	4,635	7,164	0.67%	0.93%	1.87%	4.64%	6.37%
Total	34,489	41,808	62,001	99,958	112,483	100.00%	100.00%	100.00%	100.00%	100.00%

=== 2020 census ===
As of the 2020 census, the county had a population of 112,483, 39,477 households, and 28,095 families. The median age was 38.0 years; 24.7% of residents were under the age of 18 and 14.3% of residents were 65 years of age or older. For every 100 females there were 89.6 males, and for every 100 females age 18 and over there were 84.8 males age 18 and over. Sixty-six percent of residents lived in urban areas, while 34.0% lived in rural areas.

The racial makeup of the county was 42.7% White, 46.9% Black or African American, 0.3% American Indian and Alaska Native, 0.9% Asian, 0.1% Native Hawaiian and Pacific Islander, 3.3% from some other race, and 5.7% from two or more races. Hispanic or Latino residents of any race comprised 6.4% of the population.

There were 39,477 households in the county, of which 37.0% had children under the age of 18 living with them and 32.0% had a female householder with no spouse or partner present. About 21.9% of all households were made up of individuals and 8.4% had someone living alone who was 65 years of age or older.

There were 41,756 housing units, of which 5.5% were vacant. Among occupied housing units, 70.2% were owner-occupied and 29.8% were renter-occupied. The homeowner vacancy rate was 1.7% and the rental vacancy rate was 5.2%.

== Education ==
Most of Newton County is in the Newton County School System. Portions in Social Circle are in the Social Circle City School District.

== Politics ==
As of the 2020s, Newton County is a usually Democratic voting county. For the first half of the 20th century, Newton County followed the regular Solid South pattern of voting Democratic. It would later become a state bellwether from 1968 to 2004—meaning that the county's voting intention was an accurate predictor of the overall statewide winner. From 2008 to 2016, Newton County had been narrowly won by Democrats thanks to its location within the Atlanta metro as well as the influx of progressive voters both the region and Newton proper have experienced in recent years. This margin ballooned to a double-digit percentage in 2020 when Joe Biden flipped the state back into the Democratic column; Kamala Harris built upon this margin four years later, winning Newton by just over 15% even as she narrowly lost Georgia and the election.

United States presidential election results for Newton County, Georgia
Year	Republican		Democratic		Third party(ies)	
Year	No.	%	No.	%	No.	%
1880	581	43.88%	743	56.12%	0	0.00%
1884	792	49.69%	802	50.31%	0	0.00%
1888	398	32.65%	788	64.64%	33	2.71%
1892	611	36.41%	1,005	59.89%	62	3.69%
1896	580	36.05%	973	60.47%	56	3.48%
1900	294	26.56%	790	71.36%	23	2.08%
1904	354	25.99%	928	68.14%	80	5.87%
1908	303	30.15%	643	63.98%	59	5.87%
1912	43	4.57%	840	89.36%	57	6.06%
1916	39	3.60%	943	86.99%	102	9.41%
1920	349	31.67%	753	68.33%	0	0.00%
1924	139	14.63%	716	75.37%	95	10.00%
1928	698	44.43%	873	55.57%	0	0.00%
1932	45	2.61%	1,672	96.82%	10	0.58%
1936	123	5.79%	1,994	93.79%	9	0.42%
1940	95	5.90%	1,512	93.85%	4	0.25%
1944	123	5.73%	2,022	94.27%	0	0.00%
1948	243	9.72%	2,113	84.52%	144	5.76%
1952	431	10.88%	3,529	89.12%	0	0.00%
1956	532	14.13%	3,232	85.87%	0	0.00%
1960	708	18.19%	3,185	81.81%	0	0.00%
1964	2,678	42.52%	3,620	57.48%	0	0.00%
1968	1,660	24.87%	1,998	29.93%	3,017	45.20%
1972	4,647	77.10%	1,380	22.90%	0	0.00%
1976	2,137	25.35%	6,294	74.65%	0	0.00%
1980	3,206	35.40%	5,611	61.96%	239	2.64%
1984	5,810	63.16%	3,389	36.84%	0	0.00%
1988	5,809	64.77%	3,111	34.69%	49	0.55%
1992	5,804	42.49%	5,811	42.54%	2,044	14.96%
1996	7,274	47.10%	6,759	43.77%	1,410	9.13%
2000	11,127	60.56%	6,703	36.48%	545	2.97%
2004	18,095	61.99%	10,939	37.47%	157	0.54%
2008	20,337	49.03%	20,827	50.21%	318	0.77%
2012	20,982	48.45%	21,851	50.45%	476	1.10%
2016	20,913	47.27%	21,943	49.60%	1,382	3.12%
2020	23,869	43.99%	29,789	54.90%	605	1.11%
2024	24,893	42.16%	33,839	57.30%	319	0.54%

United States Senate election results for Newton County, Georgia2
Year	Republican		Democratic		Third party(ies)	
Year	No.	%	No.	%	No.	%
2020	23,408	43.53%	29,220	54.33%	1,150	2.14%
2020	20,620	42.26%	28,177	57.74%	0	0.00%

United States Senate election results for Newton County, Georgia3
Year	Republican		Democratic		Third party(ies)	
Year	No.	%	No.	%	No.	%
2020	13,443	25.09%	20,450	38.17%	19,679	36.73%
2020	20,493	41.98%	28,324	58.02%	0	0.00%
2022	17,577	41.16%	24,348	57.01%	783	1.83%
2022	15,635	41.15%	22,356	58.85%	0	0.00%

Georgia Gubernatorial election results for Newton County
Year	Republican		Democratic		Third party(ies)	
Year	No.	%	No.	%	No.	%
2022	19,094	44.53%	23,531	54.88%	251	0.59%

Board of Commissioners
District	Commissioner	Party
CHAIR (at-large)	Marcello Banes (chairman)	Democratic
District 1	Stan Edwards	Republican
District 2	T. Demond Mason	Democratic
District 3	Stephanie Lindsey	Democratic
District 4	J.C. Henderson	Democratic
District 5	LeAnne Long	Republican

For elections to the United States House of Representatives, Newton County is part of the 10th and 13th congressional district, currently represented by Mike Collins and David Scott respectively. For elections to the Georgia State Senate, Newton County is divided between districts 42 and 43. For elections to the Georgia House of Representatives, Newton County is part of districts 113, 114 and 118.

== See also ==
- National Register of Historic Places listings in Newton County, Georgia
- List of counties in Georgia
