= Georgia State Route 81 =

State highway in Georgia, United States

State Route 81
- SR 81 highlighted in red

Route information
- Maintained by GDOT
- Length: 68.5 mi (110.2 km)

Major junctions
- West end: US 19 / US 41 / SR 3 south of Lovejoy
- SR 20 in McDonough; I-75 in McDonough; US 23 / SR 42 in McDonough; US 278 / SR 12 in Covington; US 78 / SR 10 in Loganville; SR 20 in Loganville; US 29 / SR 316 southwest of Winder
- North end: US 29 Bus. / SR 8 / SR 11 / SR 53 in Winder

Location
- Country: United States
- State: Georgia
- Counties: Henry, Newton, Walton, Barrow

Highway system
- Georgia State Highway System; Interstate; US; State; Special
← SR 80	→ US 82

State Route 81 (SR 81) is a 69.0-mile-long (111.0 km) diagonal state highway that travels southwest-to-northeast in the northwestern part of the U.S. state of Georgia. Its path exists within portions of Henry, Newton, Walton, and Barrow counties. It connects the McDonough area with Winder, via Covington and Loganville.

== Route description ==
=== Western terminus to Oxford ===
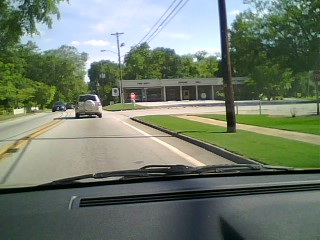
SR 81 south in Oxford in May 2009

SR 81 begins at an intersection with US 19/US 41/SR 3 (Bear Creek Boulevard), just north of Hampton, in Henry County. It heads east to McDonough. There, it intersects SR 20 (Hampton Road). They run concurrent to the northeast, into the main part of town. Immediately, they have an interchange with Interstate 75 (I-75) at exit 218. The exit was rebuilt into a diverging diamond interchange, with construction being completed in June 2022. Continuing east, the two highways intersect US 23/SR 42 in the downtown McDonough Square.

From the downtown square to an intersection with SR 155 (Zack Hinton Parkway) the highways form an east–west one-way pair. At this intersection, SR 20 splits off to the north. SR 81 then heads to the southeast before curving to the northeast and crosses over the South River, into Newton County. The bridge over the South River was replaced by Georgia DOT, with traffic reopening in December 2021.

In Henry County, SR 81 is signed as a west–east route; signage changes to south–north at or near the Newton County line. The highway has an intersection with SR 212. Then, it heads north before curving to the northeast again. It meets SR 162 just before it enters Porterdale. The intersection with SR 162 is under construction to install a new roundabout; completion is expected in May 2020, with traffic opening in January 2020. In town is an intersection with the northern terminus of SR 162 Connector. SR 81 crosses over the Yellow River and passes through the main part of town. Immediately after leaving Porterdale, it enters Covington, where it turns north and intersects US 278/SR 12, before passing under, but not interchanging I-20. Then, it passes through Oxford.

=== Oxford to Winder ===
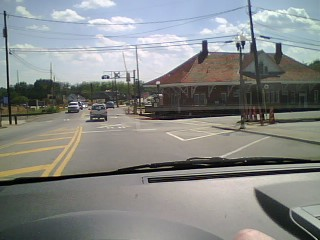
SR 81 south in Winder in May 2009

On the northern end of Oxford, the road curves to the north-northeast and meet the northern terminus of SR 142, before turning to the north and entering Walton County. Northward is Walnut Grove, where it intersects SR 138, after which the route heads north-northwest to Loganville. In town is a brief concurrency with US 78/SR 10 (Atlanta Highway) and splits off to the northwest. In the main part of town is a very brief concurrency with SR 20. Then, it heads northeast, passing through rural areas of the county, before it crosses the Apalachee River into Barrow County.

Southwest of Winder is an intersection with US 29/SR 316. As of fall 2019, the intersection is under construction to be converted into a grade-separated interchange. Construction is estimated to be completed in October 2020. Just before entering Winder, the highway passes Fort Yargo State Park on its western end. In Winder, it reaches its northern terminus, an intersection with US 29 Business/SR 8/SR 11/SR 53.

=== National Highway System ===
The following portions of SR 81 are part of the National Highway System, a system of routes determined to be the most important for the nation's economy, mobility, and defense:

- From SR 155 in McDonough to the intersection with the southern terminus of Crowell Road and the western terminus of Covington Bypass in Porterdale
- The entire length of the concurrency with US 78/SR 10 in Loganville

== Major intersections ==
County	Location	mi	km	Destinations	Notes
Henry		0.0	0.0	US 19 / US 41 / SR 3 (Bear Creek Boulevard)	Western terminus
Henry	McDonough	8.4	13.5	SR 20 west (McDonough Hampton Road) – Hampton	Southern end of SR 20 concurrency
Henry	McDonough	8.6	13.8	I-75 (SR 401) – Macon, Atlanta	I-75 exit 218
Henry	McDonough	11.3	18.2	US 23 south / SR 42 south (Griffin Street) – Locust Grove, Jackson	Southbound lanes of US 23/SR 42 on one-way pairs
Henry	McDonough	11.3	18.2	US 23 north / SR 42 north (Macon Street) – Stockbridge	Northbound lanes of US 23/SR 42 on one-way pairs
Henry	McDonough	11.8	19.0	SR 20 east / SR 155 (Zack Hinton Parkway) – Conyers, Griffin	Northern end of SR 20 concurrency
Newton		24.5	39.4	SR 212 – Monticello	
Newton		30.4	48.9	SR 162 (Lovers Lane Road / Salem Road) – Conyers	
Newton	Porterdale	31.6	50.9	SR 162 Conn. south	Northern terminus of SR 162 Conn.
Newton	Covington	35.5	57.1	US 278 / SR 12 – Conyers, Madison	
Newton		40.2	64.7	SR 142 south (Industrial Park Boulevard NE) – Covington	Northern terminus of SR 142
Walton	Walnut Grove	45.4	73.1	SR 138 – Conyers, Monroe	
Walton	Loganville	52.1	83.8	US 78 east / SR 10 east (Atlanta Highway) – Monroe	Southern end of US 78/SR 10 concurrency
Walton	Loganville	52.5	84.5	US 78 west / SR 10 west (Atlanta Highway) – Snellville	Northern end of US 78/SR 10 concurrency
Walton	Loganville	53.2	85.6	SR 20 west (Main Street) – Conyers	Southern end of SR 20 concurrency
Walton	Loganville	53.4	85.9	SR 20 east (Loganville Highway SW) – Lawrenceville	Northern end of SR 20 concurrency
Barrow		64.7	104.1	US 29 / SR 316 (University Parkway) – Lawrenceville, Athens	Interchange; SR 316 exit 5
Barrow	Winder	68.5	110.2	US 29 Bus. / SR 8 (May Street) / SR 11 / SR 53 (East May Street/North Broad Street) – Lawrenceville, Athens, Jefferson	Northern terminus
1.000 mi = 1.609 km; 1.000 km = 0.621 mi: Concurrency terminus; Unopened
