= Starrsville, Georgia =

- Starrsville Historic District
- U.S. National Register of Historic Places
- U.S. Historic district
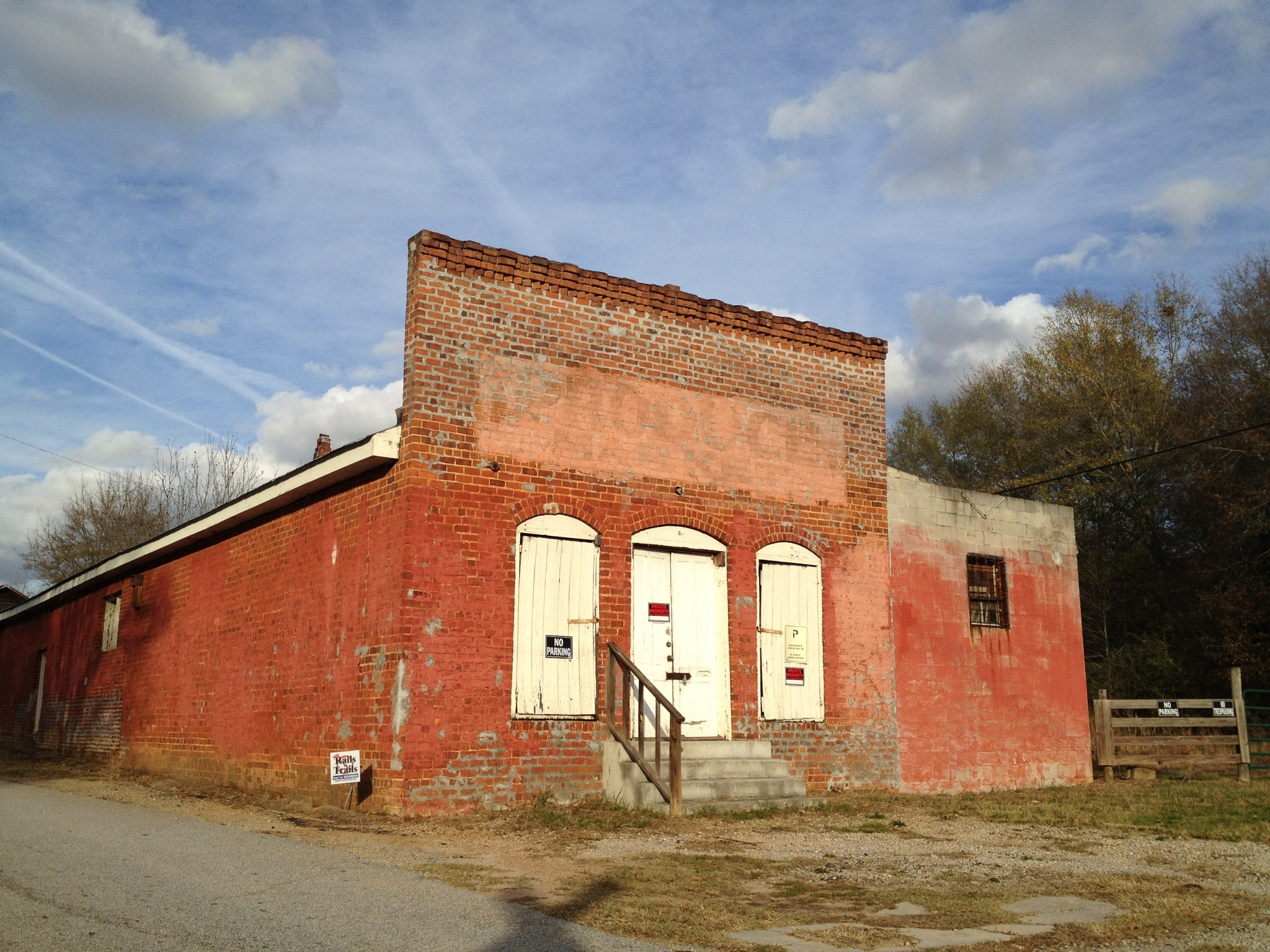

- Location within Metro Atlanta
- Location: near Dixie Road and County Road 213 southeast of Covington, Georgia
- Coordinates: 33.533786°N 83.804473°W
- Architectural style: Greek Revival, Italianate, Colonial Revival
- NRHP reference No.: 98000715
- Added to NRHP: June 26, 1998

Starrsville is an unincorporated community in an exurban area 5.4 miles (8.7 km) southeast of Covington, Newton County, Georgia, United States.

== History ==
Starrsville was founded by the Starr and Epps families in 1821 and is mentioned as early as the 1820s for its "good schools". The post office opened in 1836.

Young John Allen, the Methodist missionary, attended high school here. Warren Akin Candler (of the Coca-Cola Candlers) described Allen's conversion to Christianity while attending high school at Looney's school in Starrsville in September 1853.

The Central of Georgia Railway arrived in 1890 and the area came to be known as New Starrsville.

In 1900 Starsville had a population of 57, with a "money order post office,... several good stores, and express office and (sic) does some shipping".

In 1909 Starrsville was noted for its brick plant.

The post office closed in 1976. The area is now in the midst of the exurban development of the Covington area which is part of Metro Atlanta.

Starrsville contains the Starrsville Historic District, listed on the National Register of Historic Places in 1998. In addition to the historic buildings in the Historic District there is also a Starrsville Plantation (now hosting events) and both Starrsville and Epps cemeteries in the area.
