= Esom Hill, Georgia =

Unincorporated community in Georgia, U.S.

Coordinates: 33°56′56″N 85°23′16″W

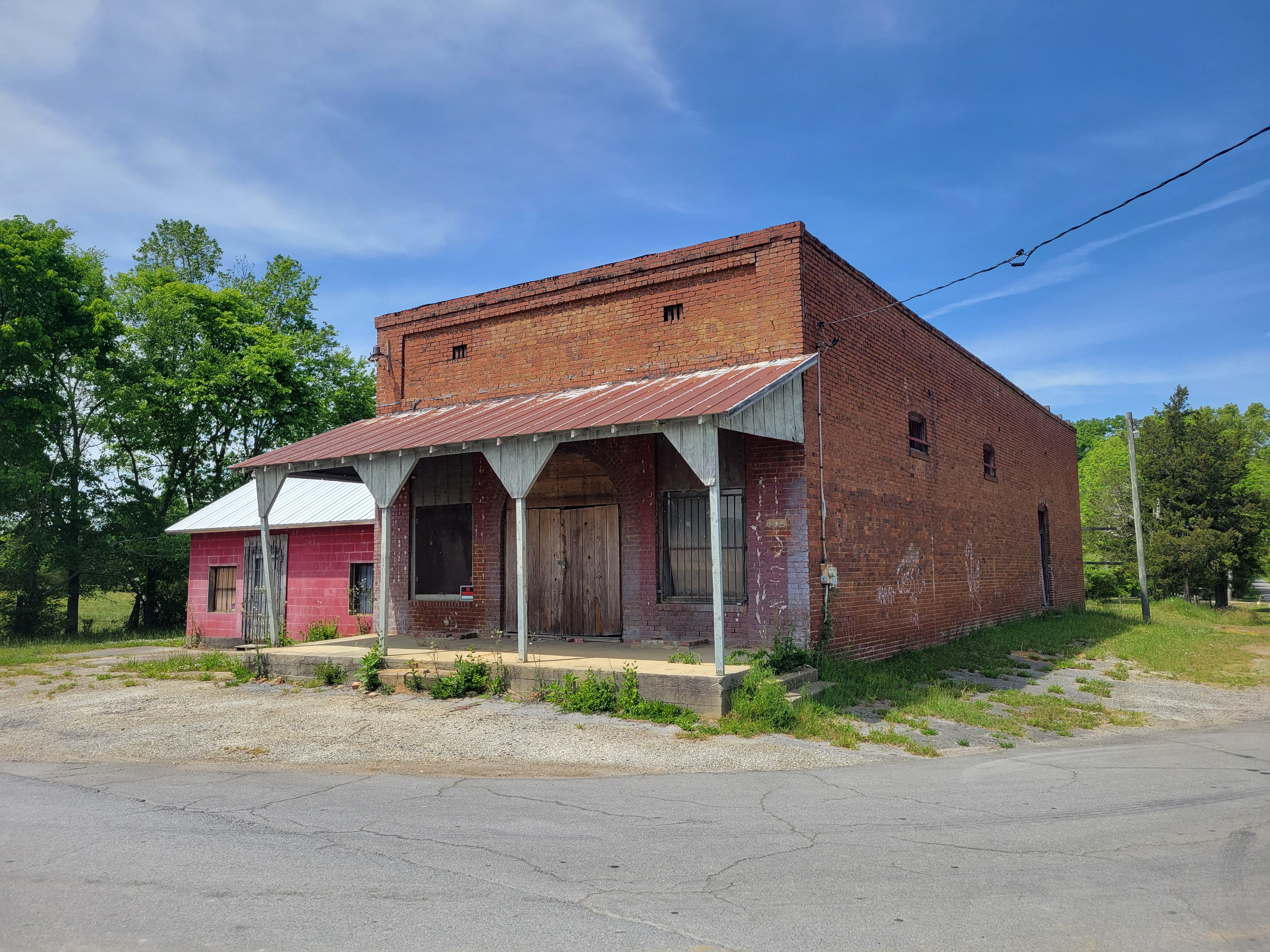
Former Brewster Mercantile Company

Esom Hill is an unincorporated community in Polk County, in the U.S. state of Georgia.

== History ==
Esom Hill grew up around the local church, Shiloh Baptist, which was founded in 1848. The southern Baptist Church remains a vital part of the community to this day. A post office in Esom Hill began operations in 1850.
