= Porterdale, Georgia =

- Town
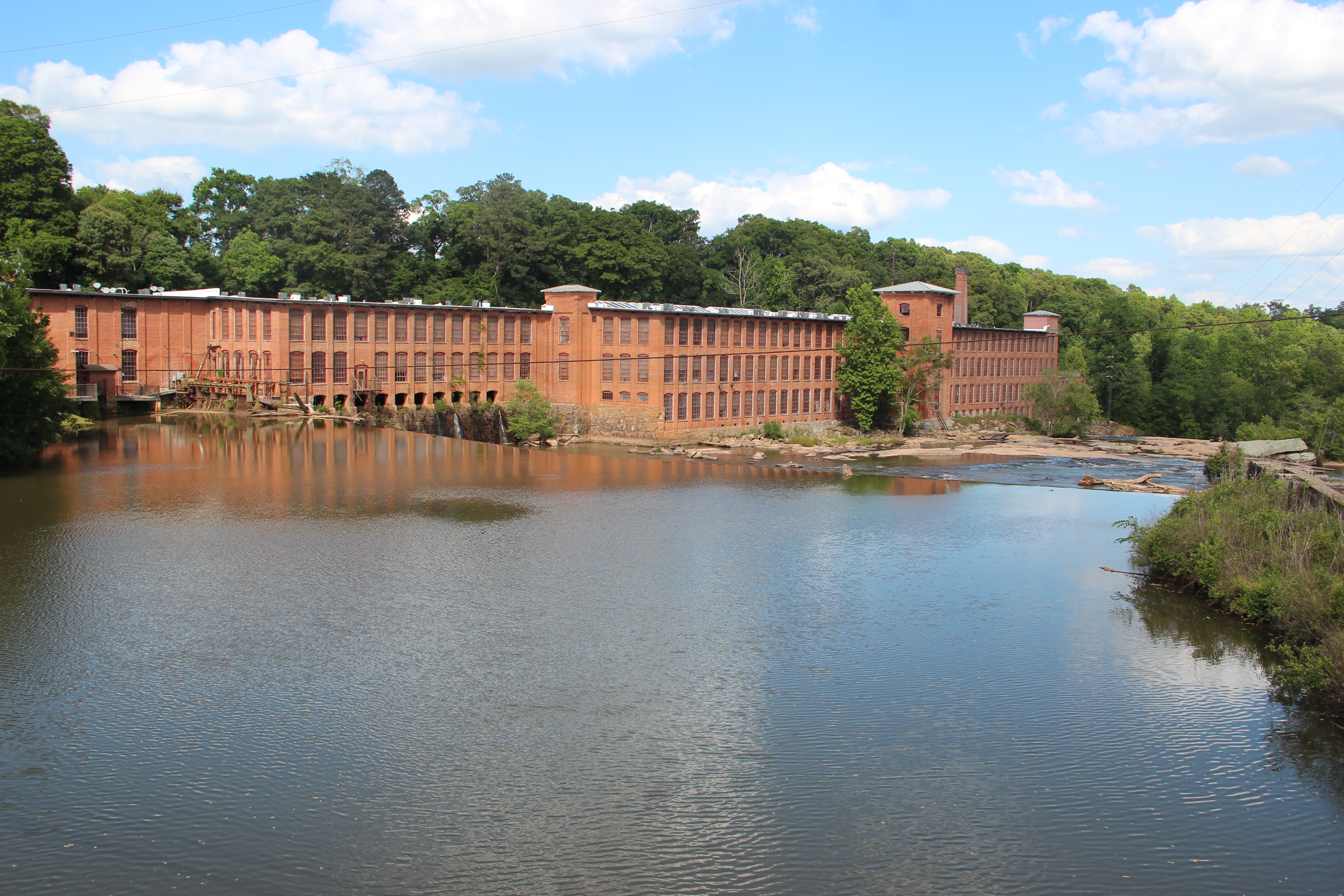
- Porterdale Mill

- Flag Logo

- Location in Newton County and the state of Georgia
- Coordinates: 33°34′11″N 83°53′53″W
- Country: United States
- State: Georgia
- County: Newton

Area
  - Total: 2.43 sq mi (6.29 km^{2})
  - Land: 2.38 sq mi (6.16 km^{2})
  - Water: 0.050 sq mi (0.13 km^{2})
- Elevation: 699 ft (213 m)

Population (2020)
  - Total: 1,799
  - Density: 756.3/sq mi (292.02/km^{2})
- Time zone: UTC-5 (Eastern (EST))
  - Summer (DST): UTC-4 (EDT)
- ZIP code: 30014
- Area code: 770
- FIPS code: 13-62244
- GNIS feature ID: 0332738
- Website: Porterdale, Georgia Website

Porterdale is a town in Newton County, Georgia, the United States. The population was 1,799 in 2020.

== History ==
Porterdale was incorporated on March 10, 1917, and was named after Oliver S. Porter, a local mill owner.

== Geography ==
Porterdale is located at 33°34′11″N 83°53′53″W (33.569585, -83.897968).

According to the United States Census Bureau, the town has a total area of 1.0 square mile (2.6 km^{2}), all land.

== Demographics ==
Historical population
Census	Pop.	Note	%±
1920	2,880		—
1930	3,002		4.2%
1940	3,116		3.8%
1950	3,207		2.9%
1960	2,365		−26.3%
1970	1,773		−25.0%
1980	1,451		−18.2%
1990	1,278		−11.9%
2000	1,281		0.2%
2010	1,429		11.6%
2020	1,799		25.9%
U.S. Decennial Census

=== Racial and ethnic composition ===
Porterdale city, Georgia – Racial and ethnic composition Note: the US Census treats Hispanic/Latino as an ethnic category. This table excludes Latinos from the racial categories and assigns them to a separate category. Hispanics/Latinos may be of any race.
Race / Ethnicity (NH = Non-Hispanic)	Pop 2000	Pop 2010	Pop 2020	% 2000	% 2010	% 2020
White alone (NH)	1,172	928	976	91.49%	64.94%	54.25%
Black or African American alone (NH)	59	393	617	4.61%	27.50%	34.30%
Native American or Alaska Native alone (NH)	4	5	4	0.31%	0.35%	0.22%
Asian alone (NH)	12	2	14	0.94%	0.14%	0.78%
Native Hawaiian or Pacific Islander alone (NH)	0	0	0	0.00%	0.00%	0.00%
Other race alone (NH)	1	8	16	0.08%	0.56%	0.89%
Mixed race or Multiracial (NH)	9	33	96	0.70%	2.31%	5.34%
Hispanic or Latino (any race)	24	60	76	1.87%	4.20%	4.22%
Total	1,281	1,429	1,799	100.00%	100.00%	100.00%

=== 2020 census ===
As of the 2020 United States census, there were 1,799 people, 667 households, and 370 families residing in the city.

== Infrastructure ==
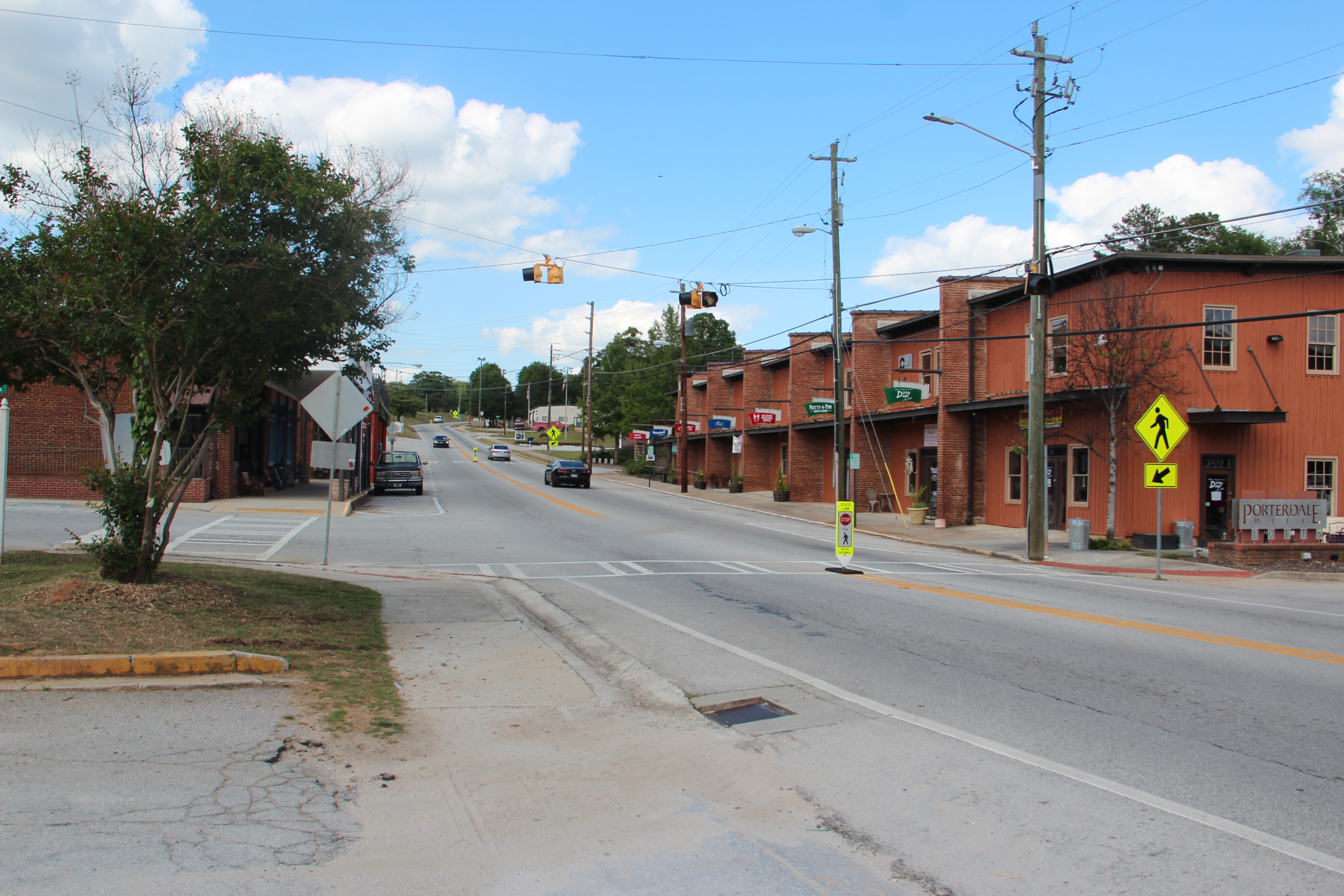
Georgia State Route 81 in Porterdale.

=== Major highways ===
- Georgia State Route 81

== Notable people ==
- Robert C. Blankenship was decorated with the Dutch Military Order of William (the Dutch equivalent of the Congressional Medal of Honor) for his bravery in Operation Market Garden; born in Porterdale.
- Raymond Moody psychologist and author who coined the term near-death experience; born in Porterdale.
