= Covington, Georgia =

City in Georgia, United States

- City
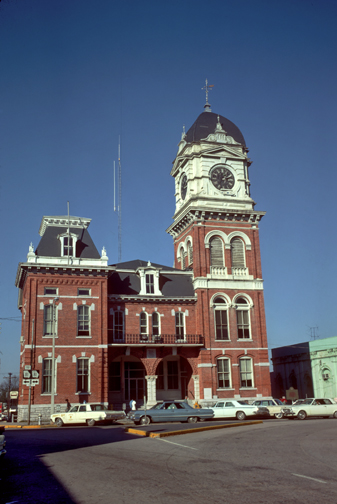
- Newton County Courthouse (1964)

- Flag Seal Logo

- Location in Newton County and the state of Georgia

- Location of Covington in Metro Atlanta
- Coordinates: 33°36′N 83°52′W
- Country: United States
- State: Georgia
- County: Newton

Government
  - Mayor: Fleeta Baggett

Area
  - Total: 15.94 sq mi (41.28 km^{2})
  - Land: 15.70 sq mi (40.66 km^{2})
  - Water: 0.24 sq mi (0.62 km^{2})
- Elevation: 741 ft (226 m)

Population (2020)
  - Total: 14,192
  - Density: 904.1/sq mi (349.08/km^{2})
- Time zone: UTC−5 (Eastern (EST))
  - Summer (DST): UTC−4 (EDT)
- ZIP codes: 30014-30016
- Area code: 470/678/770
- FIPS code: 13-20064
- GNIS feature ID: 0355354
- Website: cityofcovington.org

- Covington Historic District
- U.S. National Register of Historic Places
- U.S. Historic district
- Location within Georgia Location within the United States
- Location: Roughly Covington City S of US 278, Covington, Georgia
- Coordinates: 33°35′41″N 83°51′12″W
- Built: 1821
- Architect: Bruce and Morgan; Golucke, J.W., and Company, et al.
- Architectural style: Greek Revival, Second Empire, Italianate
- NRHP reference No.: 98000969
- Added to NRHP: August 6, 1998

Covington is a city in the U.S. state of Georgia and the county seat of Newton County, and is part of the Atlanta metropolitan area. As of the 2020 census, its population was 14,192.

== History ==
Covington was incorporated in 1821 as the seat of the newly organized Newton County. Covington was named for United States Army Brigadier General and United States Congressman Leonard Covington, a hero of the War of 1812.

The settlement grew with the advent of the railroad in 1845. Covington incorporated as a city in 1854.

In 1864, General Sherman's troops marched through during their March to the Sea. Although they looted the city, destroying numerous buildings, several antebellum homes were spared.

=== Historic districts ===
The Covington Historic District and the North Covington Historic District within the city are both listed on the National Register of Historic Places. The maps and materials describing these two districts are available for review through City Hall. The Covington Historic District contains Floyd Street and the downtown square. The North Covington Historic District contains North Emory Street and Odum Street as its hub. Both districts have an ordinance to preserve their character, regulating changes proposed for properties, and special permits may be required.

The Covington Mill Village is also a vital part of local history. The Starrsville Historic District, site of the historic settlement of Starrsville, is in the exurban area around Covington. The Newton County Courthouse, brick store, and Salem campground are separately NRHP-listed.

== Geography ==
Covington is located in north central Georgia, in the eastern part of Metro Atlanta. Interstate 20 runs to the north of the city, with access from exits 90, 92, and 93. Via I-20, downtown Atlanta is 35 mi (56 km) west, and Augusta is 112 mi (180 km) east. U.S. Route 278 also runs through the city, leading east 16 mi (26 km) to Rutledge and northwest 11 mi (18 km) to Conyers, concurrent with I-20. Other highways that run through the city include Georgia State Routes 36, 81, and 142.

According to the United States Census Bureau, the city has a total area of 13.9 square miles (36 km^{2}), of which 13.8 square miles (36 km^{2}) is land and 0.1 square miles (0.26 km^{2}) (0.72%) is water.

=== Climate ===
Climate data for Covington, Georgia
Month	Jan	Feb	Mar	Apr	May	Jun	Jul	Aug	Sep	Oct	Nov	Dec	Year
Record high °F (°C)	81 (27)	88 (31)	90 (32)	95 (35)	100 (38)	105 (41)	110 (43)	105 (41)	103 (39)	98 (37)	87 (31)	79 (26)	110 (43)
Mean daily maximum °F (°C)	52.8 (11.6)	57.3 (14.1)	65.7 (18.7)	73.6 (23.1)	81.1 (27.3)	87.5 (30.8)	90.0 (32.2)	88.8 (31.6)	83.3 (28.5)	73.5 (23.1)	64.4 (18.0)	54.7 (12.6)	72.7 (22.6)
Daily mean °F (°C)	42.4 (5.8)	46.3 (7.9)	53.6 (12.0)	61.1 (16.2)	69.4 (20.8)	76.9 (24.9)	79.9 (26.6)	79.2 (26.2)	73.1 (22.8)	62.5 (16.9)	53.1 (11.7)	44.5 (6.9)	61.8 (16.6)
Mean daily minimum °F (°C)	32.0 (0.0)	35.4 (1.9)	41.5 (5.3)	48.6 (9.2)	57.7 (14.3)	66.3 (19.1)	69.8 (21.0)	69.5 (20.8)	62.9 (17.2)	51.4 (10.8)	41.8 (5.4)	34.2 (1.2)	50.9 (10.5)
Record low °F (°C)	−7 (−22)	−10 (−23)	9 (−13)	24 (−4)	31 (−1)	44 (7)	52 (11)	51 (11)	34 (1)	23 (−5)	5 (−15)	0 (−18)	−10 (−23)
Average precipitation inches (mm)	4.20 (107)	4.72 (120)	4.84 (123)	3.19 (81)	3.21 (82)	4.23 (107)	4.48 (114)	4.22 (107)	4.07 (103)	3.26 (83)	3.93 (100)	4.07 (103)	48.42 (1,230)

== Demographics ==
Historical population
Census	Pop.	Note	%±
1870	1,121		—
1880	1,415		26.2%
1890	1,823		28.8%
1900	2,062		13.1%
1910	2,697		30.8%
1920	3,203		18.8%
1930	3,203		0.0%
1940	3,900		21.8%
1950	5,192		33.1%
1960	8,167		57.3%
1970	10,267		25.7%
1980	10,586		3.1%
1990	10,026		−5.3%
2000	11,547		15.2%
2010	13,118		13.6%
2020	14,192		8.2%
2025 (est.)	17,477	▲	23.1%
U.S. Decennial Census; 2025

=== Racial and ethnic composition ===
Covington city, Georgia – Racial and ethnic composition Note: the US Census treats Hispanic/Latino as an ethnic category. This table excludes Latinos from the racial categories and assigns them to a separate category. Hispanics/Latinos may be of any race.
Race / Ethnicity (NH = Non-Hispanic)	Pop 2000	Pop 2010	Pop 2020	% 2000	% 2010	% 2020
White alone (NH)	5,775	5,919	5,517	50.01%	45.12%	38.87%
Black or African American alone (NH)	5,229	6,140	7,069	45.28%	46.81%	49.81%
Native American or Alaska Native alone (NH)	20	26	28	0.17%	0.20%	0.20%
Asian alone (NH)	59	87	126	0.51%	0.66%	0.89%
Native Hawaiian or Pacific Islander alone (NH)	4	10	19	0.03%	0.08%	0.13%
Other race alone (NH)	20	23	86	0.17%	0.18%	0.61%
Mixed race or Multiracial (NH)	109	190	444	0.94%	1.45%	3.13%
Hispanic or Latino (any race)	331	723	903	2.87%	5.51%	6.36%
Total	11,547	13,118	14,192	100.00%	100.00%	100.00%

=== 2020 census ===
As of the 2020 census, Covington had a population of 14,192. The median age was 37.8 years. 24.6% of residents were under the age of 18 and 17.3% of residents were 65 years of age or older. For every 100 females there were 85.3 males, and for every 100 females age 18 and over there were 79.8 males age 18 and over.

97.9% of residents lived in urban areas, while 2.1% lived in rural areas.

There were 5,627 households in Covington, of which 33.4% had children under the age of 18 living in them. Of all households, 31.4% were married-couple households, 19.9% were households with a male householder and no spouse or partner present, and 42.5% were households with a female householder and no spouse or partner present. About 32.3% of all households were made up of individuals and 14.2% had someone living alone who was 65 years of age or older.

There were 6,046 housing units, of which 6.9% were vacant. The homeowner vacancy rate was 3.0% and the rental vacancy rate was 4.6%.

=== 2000 census ===
As of the census of 2000, there were 11,547 people, 4,261 households, and 2,906 families residing in the city. The population density was 839.2 inhabitants per square mile (324.0/km^{2}). There were 4,542 housing units at an average density of 330.1 per square mile (127.5/km^{2}). The racial makeup of the city was 51.55% White, 45.54% Black, 0.18% Native American, 0.55% Asian, 0.04% Pacific Islander, 0.94% from other races, and 1.19% from two or more races. Hispanic or Latino of any race were 2.87% of the population.

There were 4,261 households, out of which 31.4% had children under the age of 18 living with them, 40.0% were married couples living together, 23.6% had a female householder with no husband present, and 31.8% were non-families. 26.8% of all households were made up of individuals, and 12.6% had someone living alone who was 65 years of age or older. The average household size was 2.62 and the average family size was 3.19.

In the city, the population was spread out, with 27.5% under the age of 18, 9.1% from 18 to 24, 27.7% from 25 to 44, 20.7% from 45 to 64, and 15.0% who were 65 years of age or older. The median age was 35 years. For every 100 females, there were 88.5 males. For every 100 females age 18 and over, there were 80.7 males.

The median income for a household in the city was $31,997, and the median income for a family was $36,408. Males had a median income of $29,622 versus $23,339 for females. The per capita income for the city was $15,554. About 14.8% of families and 19.6% of the population were below the poverty line, including 33.7% of those under age 18 and 12.8% of those age 65 or over.

== Education ==
=== Newton County School District ===
The Newton County School District holds pre-school to grade twelve, and consists of fourteen elementary schools, five middle schools, three high schools, an elementary theme school, and a charter school. The district has 853 full-time teachers and 13,681 students.

=== Private education ===
- Grace Christian Academy
- Montessori School of Covington
- Providence Classical Christian School
- Peachtree Academy
- Covington Academy
- Point of Grace Christian School
- First Baptist Academy

=== Higher education ===
- Georgia Piedmont Technical College - Covington Campus
- Perimeter College at Georgia State University - Newton County Campus
- Emory University - Oxford Campus

== Tourism events ==
- Gaither's Plantation hosts a Fall Festival every year.
- The Satsuki Garden Club conducts tours of historic houses in Covington every other Christmas.
- The Vampire Diaries, Mystic Falls Tours

== Economy ==
Archer Aviation's Midnight eVTOL air taxi is set to be manufactured in Covington by carmaker Stellantis (merger of Fiat Chrysler and Peugeot).

== In film and television ==
Covington has been featured in numerous TV shows and movies since the 1950s.

- A Man called Peter (1955)
- False Face (1977)
- The Dukes of Hazzard (1979, TV series, first 5 episodes)
- The Prize Fighter (1979)
- Little Darlings (1980)
- The Cannonball Run (1981)
- Coward of the County (1981, TV movie)
- Door to Door (1985)
- Jason Lives: Friday the 13th Part VI (1986)
- Resting Place (1986, TV movie)
- A Fathers Homecoming (1988)
- In the Heat of the Night (1988–1995, TV series)
- Sudie and Simpson (1990)
- Carolina Skeletons (1991)
- White Lie (1991)
- Stay the Night (1992)
- I'll Fly Away (1991–1992, TV series)
- Grass Roots (1992)
- The Secret Passion of Robert Clayton (1992)
- My Cousin Vinny (1992)
- Kalifornia (1993)
- The Oldest Living Confederate Widow Tells All (1993 film adaption of 1989 book)
- A Passion for Justice: The Hazel Brannon Smith Story (1993)
- Past the Bleachers (1994)
- A Simple Twist of Fate (1994)
- Savannah (1996, TV series)
- Fled (1996)
- Flash (1997, TV movie)
- Miss Evers' Boys (1997 TV movie)
- Remember the Titans (1999)
- The Price of a Broken Heart (1999, TV movie)
- Wayward Son (1999)
- Run Ronnie Run (2000)
- The Accountant (2001, short film)
- Boycott (2001 film) (2001, TV movie)
- TV Road Trip (2002, documentary)
- Sweet Home Alabama (2002)
- Autorequiem (2002)
- The Fighting Temptations (2003)
- Turbulance! (2004)
- The Spy/Fancy Dress (2004)
- Bobby Jones: Stroke of Genius (2004)
- Three Wishes (2005, TV series, episode 3)
- False River (2005)
- Boxed In (2005)
- Madea's Family Reunion (2006)
- Dangerous Calling (2008)
- Get Low (2009)
- Halloween II (2009)
- The Family That Preys (2009)
- Fly By (2009)
- The Vampire Diaries (2009–2017, TV series)
- Pretty Little Liars (2010–2018, TV series)
- The Walking Dead (2010, TV series, episode 1)
- Footloose (2011)
- American Reunion (2012)
- The Odd Life of Timothy Green (2012)
- Selma (2014)
- Taken 3 (2014)
- Dolly Parton's Coat of Many Colors (2015, TV movie)
- Vacation (2015)
- Goosebumps 2: Haunted Halloween (2018)
- Dumplin' (2018)
- Legacies (2018–2022), TV series)
- Doctor Sleep (2019)
- Sweet Magnolias (2020, TV series)
- Freaky (2020)
- The American Barbecue Showdown (2020, TV series)
- Jungle Cruise (2021)
- Just Beyond (2021, TV series)
- Weapons (2025)

== Notable people ==
- Dinah Watts Pace, educator, operated an orphanage in the area
- Steadman Vincent Sanford, Chancellor of the University System of Georgia
- Curley Weaver, Early piedmont-style country-bluesman
- David Grier Martin, President of Davidson College
- George Adams, jazz tenor saxophonist
- Leon Ashley, country music singer
- Boondox (David Hutto), rapper on Majik Ninja Entertainment
- Dale Carter, former football cornerback in the NFL
- Mabel Sessions Dennis, editor and co-publisher of The Covington News
- Ellia English, actress best known for her role as Aunt Helen on The Jamie Foxx Show
- Akeem Hunt, former football running back in the NFL and CFL
- Andy Offutt Irwin, award-winning storyteller and recording artist
- Ryan Klesko, former Major League Baseball player
- Lucius Quintus Cincinnatus Lamar II, politician, Secretary of the Interior for Grover Cleveland, Associate Justice of the Supreme Court
- Demetrius McCray, former football cornerback in the NFL
- Drew Parker, Grammy-nominated country music songwriter and recording artist
- Sheldon Rankins, football defensive tackle in the NFL
- Jake Reed, former football wide receiver in the NFL
- Eric Stokes, football cornerback for the Green Bay Packers and the Las Vegas Raiders in the NFL
- Lizzie Wilkerson, African-American folk artist
- Elija Godwin, Olympic track and field athlete
- Stephon Castle, professional basketball player for the San Antonio Spurs

== See also ==
- Main Street Bank, former local bank
