= Georgia State Route 136 =

State highway in Georgia

State Route 136
- SR 136; mainline in red, connector routes in blue

Route information
- Maintained by GDOT
- Length: 136.380 mi (219.482 km)
- Existed: 1937–present

Major junctions
- West end: SR 71 at the Alabama state line west of Trenton
- I-59 in Trenton; US 11 / SR 58 in Trenton; US 27 / SR 1 in LaFayette; I-75 in Resaca; US 41 / SR 3 in Resaca; US 411 / SR 61 near Oakman; SR 5 / SR 515 near Talking Rock; US 19 / SR 400 near Dawsonville
- East end: SR 60 near Gainesville

Location
- Country: United States
- State: Georgia
- Counties: Dade, Walker, Gordon, Murray, Gilmer, Pickens, Dawson, Hall

Highway system
- Georgia State Highway System; Interstate; US; State; Special
← SR 135	→ SR 137

State Route 136 (SR 136) is a 136.380-mile-long (219.482 km) state highway that travels west-to-east through portions of Dade, Walker, Gordon, Murray, Gilmer, Pickens, Dawson, and Hall counties in the northwestern and north-central parts of the U.S. state of Georgia. The highway extends from its western terminus at SR 71 at the Alabama state line, west of Trenton, to its eastern terminus at SR 60 north-northwest of Gainesville.

== Route description ==
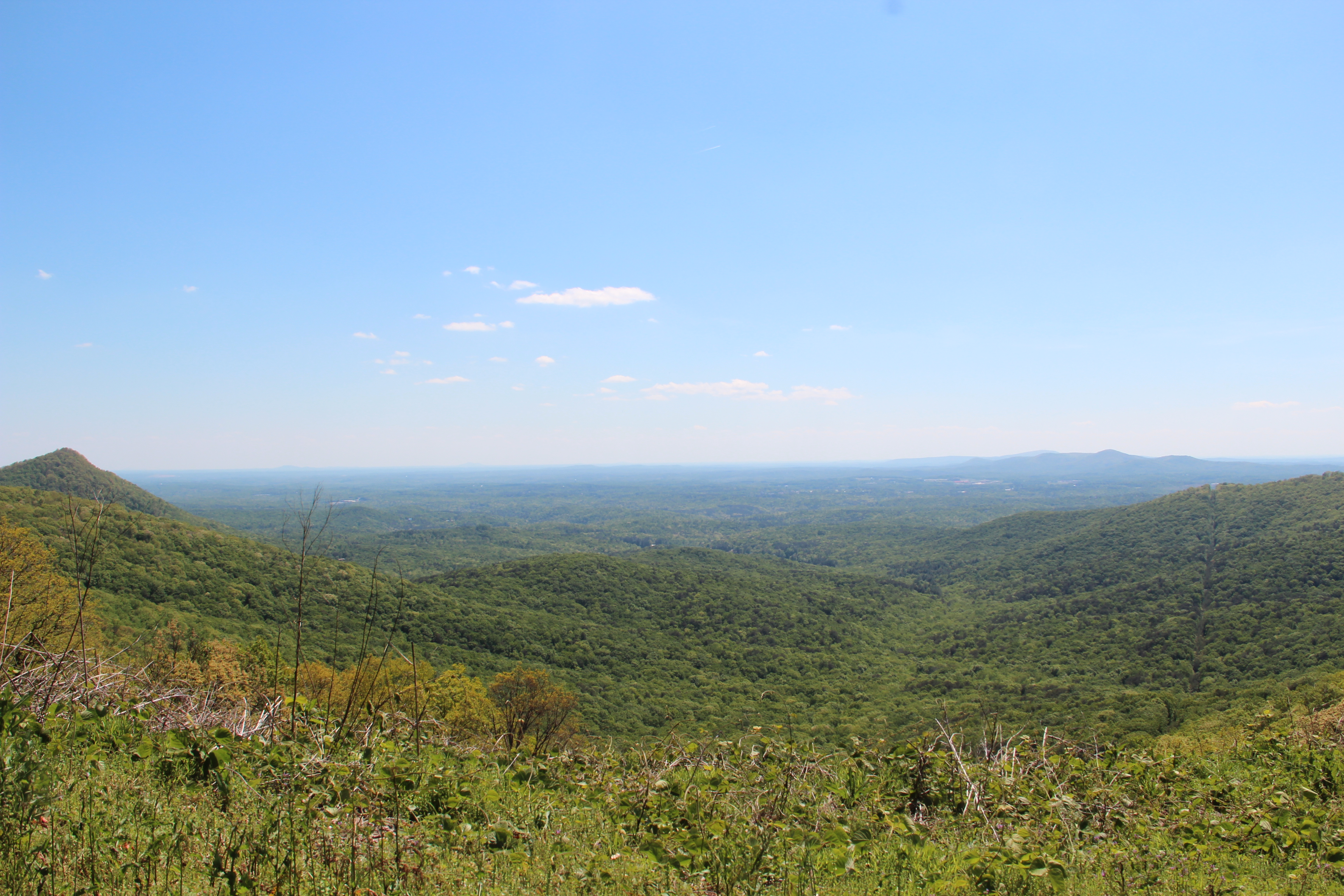
View of Pickens County from State Route 136

SR 136 initially heads east from the Alabama state line on Sand Mountain, where it continues into Alabama as SR 71 in the direction of Higdon in Dekalb County. After passing the unincorporated community of Gass in Dade County, which is located in the extreme northwest corner of the state of Georgia (see map), the route descends from about 1,600 feet down to under 1,000 feet elevation via two switchback turns as it approaches Trenton, the county seat. As it passes through Trenton, SR 136 crosses I-59, and then ascends Lookout Mountain via switchbacks outside of Trenton in a southerly direction up to an elevation of about 2,000 feet near the western border of Cloudland Canyon State Park, and cuts around the state park and across the mountain into Walker County. Just after crossing into Walker County, the route makes a sharp turn to the north and descends yet again down to an elevation of about 1,000 feet, then heads back east. This section of the road is also called the Lookout Mountain Scenic Highway.

SR 136 meanders in a southeasterly direction, then intersects US 27/SR 1 just north of LaFayette, is co-signed with these two routes south through LaFayette, then splits off and runs east in the direction of the unincorporated community of Villanow, briefly turning north and forming part of the western border of the Chattahoochee National Forest, then heading south to find passable valleys, before cutting east through the national forest area. Just west of the county line with Whitfield County, the route turns sharply south through the Johns Mountain Wildlife Management Area, then enters Gordon County in its extreme northwestern corner, and crosses I-75 as it enters Resaca. SR 136 continues in an easterly direction out of Resaca and through northern Gordon County, intersects US 411/SR 61, then crosses through the very southern section of Murray County, passing Carters Lake as it does so. Next, Hwy 136 enters southern Gilmer County. There, the route shifts southeast, enters Pickens County, then turns back to the east as it approaches Talking Rock, crossing SR 5/SR 515 just west of the town.

SR 136 now curves through the southern foothills of the Blue Ridge Mountains, gradually turning in a northeasterly direction, and crosses into Dawson County where it is also known as Gold Creek Highway. There, it again resumes a more southeasterly route as it becomes briefly concurrent with SR 183 south of Amicalola Falls State Park. Continuing southeast, it passes north of Dawsonville, to which it is connected via a former state route spur now called Shoal Creek Road, and crosses SR 19/SR 400. SR 136 heads into Hall County as it crosses the Chestatee River branch of Lake Lanier, and arrives at its eastern terminus when it intersects SR 60 north of Lake Lanier and Gainesville.

=== Traffic ===
The Georgia Department of Transportation average annual daily traffic (AADT) numbers for the year 2011 show a variety of average daily traffic load numbers as the route travels across northern Georgia. Daily vehicle averages start with just under 3,500 vehicle east of the Alabama state line, but quickly rise from over 7,000 to just over 14,000 vehicles west of I-59, with numbers falling rapidly back to around 7,200 vehicles east of I-59, and decreasing closer to the averages seen in the rural areas of the route, namely of around 2,300 vehicles per day as the route approaches Walker County. Numbers stay in the mid-2,000 range to west of LaFayette, where they increase again into the mid-3,000 range, and reach their maximum as SR 136 is concurrent with US 27/SR 1, where averages reach just over 15,000 vehicles per day. East of the concurrency the vehicle load deceases to around 6,000 vehicles, going down to around 3,000 vehicles as the route runs through the Chattahoochee National Forest.

As SR 136 heads through Walker County, numbers again decrease to between 1,500 and 2,000 vehicles per day, increasing to between 3,000 and 4,000 vehicles in the vicinity of I-75 in Gordon County. East of I-75, the vehicle load returns to the rural average numbers of around 2,000 vehicles, not increasing again markedly until west of SR 5/SR 515, where the route feeds nearly 4,000 vehicles into the south-to-north route. East of SR 5, average numbers really drop, going from 1,700 all the way down to a route low of 370 in the western portion of Dawson County. Averages briefly increase to around 2,500 as the route is concurrent with SR 183, rise to around 3,100 north of Dawsonville, then fall as low as 1,400, but rise once again as SR 400 is approaching. Once in Hall County, the route sees a spike in its last few miles as it meets SR 60, where average vehicle numbers as just below 6,400 vehicles per day.

== History ==
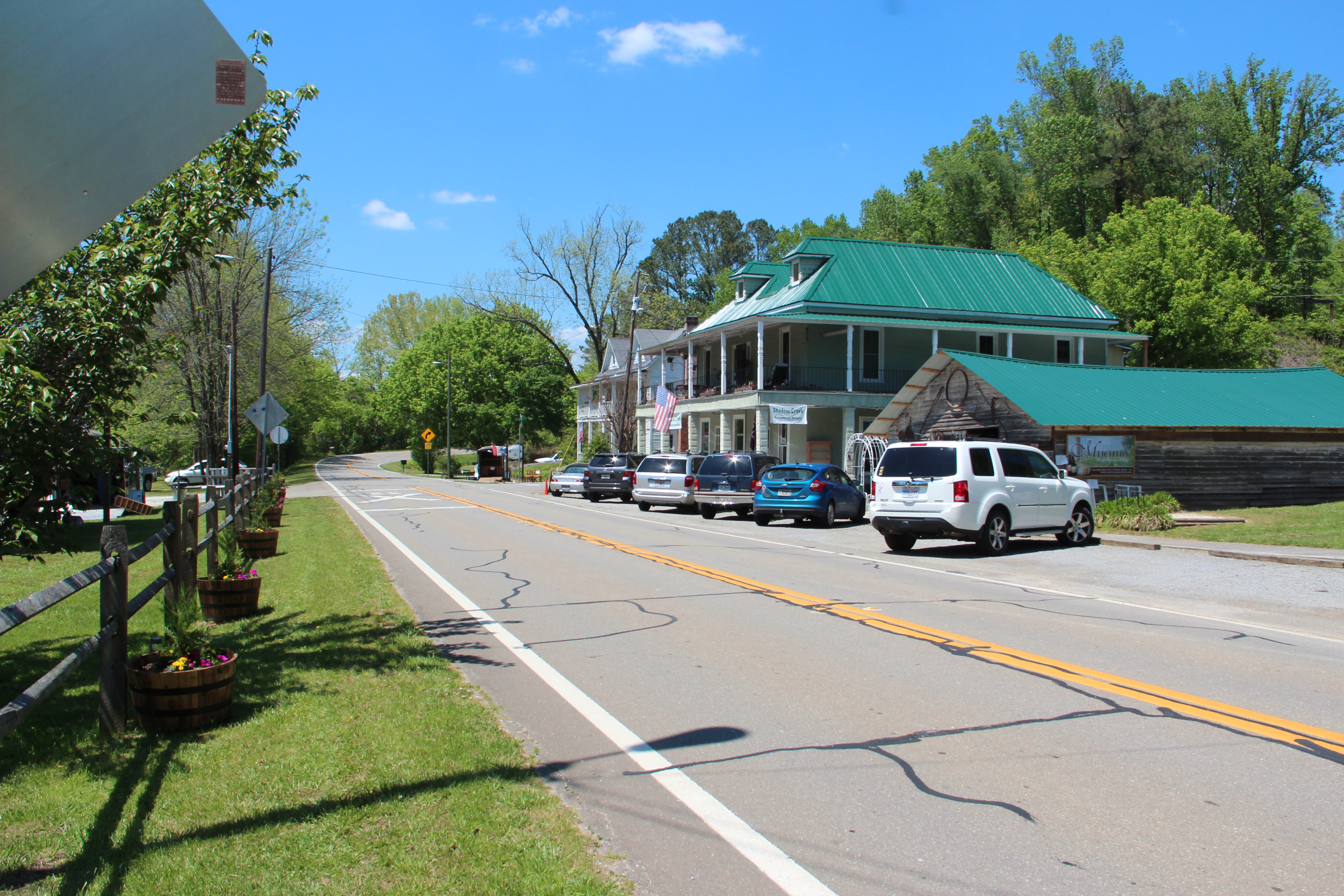
SR 136 in Talking Rock

=== 1920s ===
The highway that would eventually become SR 136 was established at least as early as 1919 as SR 1 from LaFayette to Trenton. By the end of 1921, SR 1 was shifted to the east. Also, SR 53 was indicated to be a "contingent road" from LaFayette to Calhoun, with a concurrency with SR 1 in LaFayette. By the end of 1926, the portion of SR 53 northwest of Calhoun and in the city was under construction. The decade ended with the path of SR 53 west of Calhoun shifted to the south. Its LaFayette–Villanow segment was redesignated as part of SR 2.

=== 1930s ===
In 1930, the portion of SR 2 from approximately Naomi to Villanow had a completed semi hard surface. In February 1932, this segment's east end was shifted slightly north. A few months later, SR 43 was established on a segment northwest of Juno. Just over two years later, SR 2 was extended northwest to an undetermined point northwest of LaFayette. In early 1937, SR 143 was designated on SR 53's former path from Villanow to Calhoun. SR 136 was established from SR 43 northwest of Dawsonville to Gainesville. Later that year, SR 2 northwest of LaFayette was extended farther from the city. The southeast part was under construction, while the northwest part had completed grading, but was not surfaced. By the middle of 1939, SR 2 was extended farther to the northwest, to its intersection with SR 157. The western two-thirds of this segment had completed grading, but was not surfaced. The year ended with SR 2 being extended north-northwest to US 11/SR 58 in Trenton, with the eastern part under construction. SR 156 was established on a path from US 411/SR 61 just north of the Gordon–Murray county line to SR 154 in Blaine. Also, SR 154 was established from SR 156 in Blaine to SR 5 in Talking Rock.

=== 1940s ===
In early 1940, this last extension of SR 2 had completed grading, but was not surfaced. In the middle part of the year, the portion of SR 2 both north-northwest and east-southeast of the SR 157 intersection had a completed hard surface. Also, SR 154, from Blaine to Talking Rock, was under construction. At the end of the year, SR 154 was established on an alignment from SR 108 northeast of Jasper to SR 183 northwest of Dawsonville. A few months later, nearly the entire portion of SR 2 from just southeast of Cooper Heights to a point just south-southeast of Trenton, as well as a small portion of SR 136 north-northwest of the SR 154/SR 183 intersection, had a completed hard surface. Around the middle of the year, the portion of SR 154 from northeast of Jasper to northwest of Dawsonville was under construction. The year ended with SR 136's segment from the SR 154/SR 183 intersection to SR 9 northeast of Dawsonville being under construction. In 1942, SR 154 from Blaine to Talking Rock had completed grading, but was not surfaced. SR 136 north-northwest of Gainesville had a completed hard surface. By the end of 1946, SR 2 was extended west-southwest to the Alabama state line. SR 154 was redesignated as part of SR 136. The segment of SR 2 from LaFayette to Villanow, the entire length of the former SR 154, and the portion of SR 136 northwest of Emma, was hard surfaced. By the end of 1948, SR 2 west-southwest of Trenton, as well as the entire western segment of SR 143, had a "sand clay, top soil, or stabilized earth" surface. Also, SR 136, from SR 108 northeast of Jasper to SR 183 northwest of Emma, had completed grading, but was not surfaced. The next year, SR 2 was shifted to a much more northern routing; its former alignment from the Alabama state line to Villanow was redesignated as a western extension of SR 143. Also, the portion of SR 143 northwest of LaFayette was hard surfaced.

=== 1950s ===
By the middle of 1950, a portion of SR 143 just east-southeast of Trenton was hard surfaced. In 1953, the portion of this highway west-southwest of Trenton, its portion from Sugar Valley to Calhoun, and the entire Hall County portion of SR 136, were all hard surfaced. By the middle of 1955, the Gordon County segment of the Villanow–Sugar Valley segment had completed grading, but was not surfaced. About two years later, SR 136 was truncated to a point between Murrayville and Gainesville. Its former path into Gainesville was redesignated as part of SR 60. Two portions of SR 136 were hard surfaced: from north-northeast of Jasper to northeast of Dawsonville and from west-southwest of Murrayville to northwest of Gainesville.

=== 1960s ===
By the end of 1960, the entire segment of SR 143, from the Alabama state line to Calhoun, was paved. The segment of SR 156 from US 411/SR 61 north of Oakman to just east of the Murray–Gilmer county line had a "topsoil or gravel, unpaved" surface; its entire Pickens County portion was paved. By the time 1963 ended, SR 136, from US 19/SR 9 northeast of Dawsonville to west-southwest of Murrayville, had completed grading, but was not surfaced. In the middle of the decade, an unnumbered road was built from SR 143 northwest of Sugar Valley to Resaca, then east to SR 225 at a point north-northeast of Calhoun. By the end of 1968, SR 136 from northeast of Dawsonville to west-southwest of Murrayville was hard surfaced. The next year, the unnumbered road was extended east of US 411/SR 61 north of Oakman.

=== 1970s and 1980s ===
In 1972, SR 143 Conn. was established on the previously unnumbered road from SR 143 northwest of Sugar Valley to US 41/SR 3 in Resaca. In 1977, SR 143 (from the Alabama state line to northwest of Sugar Valley) and the entire length of SR 143 Conn. were redesignated as part of SR 136. It was also designated on the previously unnumbered road from Resaca to north of Oakman. SR 156 was shifted to a completely different alignment; its former path from north of Oakman to Blaine was also redesignated as part of SR 136. In 1980, SR 136's two segments were connected, closing the gap from northwest of Talking Rock to northeast of Jasper.

== Major intersections ==
County	Location	mi	km	Destinations	Notes
Dade		0.000	0.000	SR 71 west – Higdon, Ala	Western terminus at the Alabama state line
Dade	Gass	2.115	3.404	SR 301 – Ider, Ala, Bryant, Ala	
Dade	Trenton	5.211	8.386	I-59 (SR 406) – Birmingham, Chattanooga	I-59 exit 11
Dade	Trenton	5.454	8.777	US 11 north (Main Street) / SR 58 north	Western end of US 11/SR 58 concurrency
Dade	Trenton	5.587	8.991	US 11 south / SR 58 south	Eastern end of US 11/SR 58 concurrency
Dade		12.444	20.027	SR 189 north (Scenic Highway)	Southern terminus of SR 189
Walker		14.809	23.833	SR 157 (Hinkle Road)	
Walker		19.348	31.138	SR 193 – LaFayette, Chattanooga Valley	
Walker		22.956	36.944	SR 341 (Cove Road) – Chickamauga	
Walker	LaFayette	28.552	45.950	US 27 north (Main Street) / SR 1 – Chickamauga	Western end of US 27/SR 1 concurrency
Walker	LaFayette	29.000	46.671	US 27 Bus. south / SR 1 Bus. south	Northern terminus of US 27 Bus./SR 1 Bus.
Walker	LaFayette	31.481	50.664	US 27 south / SR 1 south (Martha Berry Parkway/Lyle Jones Parkway) / SR 193 north (West Main Street) – Trion, Summerville	Eastern end of US 27/SR 1 concurrency
Walker	Naomi	35.510	57.148	SR 151 south (Old Alabama Highway) – Summerville	Western end of SR 151 concurrency
Walker		36.938	59.446	SR 151 north – Ringgold	Eastern end of SR 151 concurrency
Walker	Villanow	43.530	70.055	SR 201 north – Tunnel Hill	Southern terminus of SR 201
Gordon	Sugar Valley	51.477	82.844	SR 136 Conn. south (Sugar Valley Road) – Calhoun	Northern terminus of SR 136 Conn.
Gordon	Resaca	58.004	93.348	I-75 (SR 401) – Atlanta, Chattanooga	I-75 exit 320
Gordon	Resaca	58.459	94.081	US 41 south (Battlefield Parkway) / SR 3 – Calhoun	Western end of US 41/SR 3 concurrency
Gordon	Resaca	58.558	94.240	US 41 north / SR 3 – Dalton	Eastern end of US 41/SR 3 concurrency
Gordon	Soapstick	64.157	103.251	SR 225 (Chatsworth Road) – Chatsworth, Calhoun	
Gordon	Petersburg	73.926	118.972	US 411 / SR 61 – Cartersville, Chatsworth	
Murray	No major junctions				
Gilmer		79.573	128.060	SR 382 east – Ellijay	Western terminus of SR 382
Pickens	Blaine	86.003	138.408	SR 136 Conn. south (Perrow Highway)	Northern terminus of SR 136 Conn.
Pickens	Talking Rock	88.618	142.617	SR 5 / SR 515 – Jasper, Ellijay	
Dawson		108.324	174.331	SR 183 north (Elliot Family Parkway)	Western end of SR 183 concurrency
Dawson		110.028	177.073	SR 183 south – Juno	Eastern end of SR 183 concurrency
Dawson		119.615	192.502	SR 9 (Dawsonville Highway) – Dawsonville, Dahlonega	
Dawson		125.701	202.296	US 19 / SR 400 – Cumming, Dahlonega	
Hall		136.380	219.482	SR 60 (Thompson Bridge Road) – Gainesville, Murrayville	Eastern terminus
1.000 mi = 1.609 km; 1.000 km = 0.621 mi: Concurrency terminus

== Special routes ==
=== Calhoun connector ===
State Route 136 Connector
- Location: Calhoun
- Length: 9.567 mi (15.397 km)
- Existed: 1977–present

State Route 136 Connector (SR 136 Conn.) is a 9.567-mile-long (15.397 km) connecting route in Calhoun. It connects SR 136 northwest of Sugar Valley with SR 53 Spur in Calhoun. The roadway that would eventually become SR 136 Conn. was designated as SR 53 by the end of 1921. Its path between LaFayette and Calhoun was indicated to be a "contingent road". It also was indicated to have a brief concurrency with SR 1 in LaFayette. By the end of 1926, the portion of SR 53 northwest of Calhoun, and the portion in the city itself, was under construction. By the end of 1929, the portion of SR 53 west of Calhoun was shifted southward. In early 1937, SR 143 was established on SR 53's former path from Villanow to Calhoun. Between 1946 and early 1948, this segment of SR 143 had a "sand clay, top soil, or stabilized earth" surface. In 1953, the portion of the highway from Sugar Valley to Calhoun was hard surfaced. By the middle of 1955, the Gordon County segment of the segment from Villanow to Sugar Valley had completed grading, but was not surfaced. By the end of 1960, the segment of SR 143 from Villanow to Calhoun was hard surfaced. In 1972, SR 143 Conn. was established from SR 143 northwest of Sugar Valley to US 41/SR 3 in Resaca. In 1977, the entire path of SR 143 from northwest of Sugar Valley to Calhoun was redesignated as SR 136 Conn., as all of SR 143 and SR 143 Conn. were decommissioned.

The entire route is in Gordon County.

Location	mi	km	Destinations	Notes
Chattahoochee-Oconee National Forest	0.000	0.000	SR 136 east – Villanow	Northern terminus
Calhoun	9.205	14.814	SR 156 east (Red Bud Road)	North end of SR 156 concurrency
Calhoun	9.348	15.044	SR 156 west (Roland Hayes Parkway)	South end of SR 156 concurrency
Calhoun	9.567	15.397	SR 53 Spur south	Southern terminus
1.000 mi = 1.609 km; 1.000 km = 0.621 mi: Concurrency terminus

=== Hinton connector ===
State Route 136 Connector
- Location: Hinton–Blaine
- Length: 2.653 mi (4.270 km)
- Existed: 1977–present

State Route 136 Connector (SR 136 Conn.) is a 2.653-mile-long (4.270 km) connecting route in Pickens County. It travels northeast from SR 53 in Hinton to the SR 136 mainline in Blaine. The roadway that would eventually become SR 136 Conn. was established in late 1939 as part of SR 156 from SR 154 in Blaine to SR 53 in Hinton. In early 1941, this segment of SR 156 had a "completed hard surface". By the end of 1960, it was paved. In 1977, SR 156 was shifted onto a totally different alignment; its former path from Blaine to Hinton was redesignated as SR 136 Conn.

The entire route is in Pickens County.

Location	mi	km	Destinations	Notes
Hinton	0.000	0.000	SR 53 – Fairmount, Jasper	Western terminus
Blaine	2.653	4.270	SR 136 to SR 61 / US 411 – Chatsworth	Eastern terminus
1.000 mi = 1.609 km; 1.000 km = 0.621 mi

=== Dawsonville spur route ===
State Route 136 Connector
- Location: Dawsonville
- Length: 2.653 mi (4.270 km)
- Existed: 1963–1982

State Route 136 Spur (SR 136 Spur) was a spur route of SR 136 that existed in Dawson County. SR 136 Spur was established between 1960 and the end of 1963 from SR 53 in Dawsonville to SR 136 north-northwest of the city. In 1982, SR 136 Spur was decommissioned.

== See also ==
- List of highways numbered 136
