= List of former state routes in Georgia (1–199) =

- Standard state highway markers
- State: Georgia State Route XX (SR XX)

System links
- Georgia State Highway System; Interstate; US; State; Special

This is a list of former state routes in the U.S. state of Georgia. This list represents routes that traveled through the state but are no longer in operation, have been decommissioned, or have been renumbered.

== State Route 1E ==
State Route 1E
- Location: Floyd County
- Existed: 1955–1985

State Route 1E (SR 1E) was a route in Floyd County extending along present-day Old Cedartown Road, Park Avenue, Maple Avenue, East Sixth Street, and 2nd Avenue from US 27/SR 1 to US 27/SR 1, as well as US 411/SR 53.

== State Route 3W (Albany 1946–1957) ==
State Route 3W
- Location: Albany
- Existed: 1946–1960

State Route 3W (SR 3W) was a state highway in the city of Albany. It traversed portions of Dougherty and Lee counties. At least as early as 1919, SR 3 traveled on essentially the same path as it currently does in the Albany metropolitan area. By the end of 1926, the segment of the highway from the Mitchell–Dougherty county line to Albany had a "completed hard surface". By the end of 1929, US 19 was designated on this stretch of SR 3.

By the end of 1946, SR 3W was projected to be designated from the western part of Albany to US 19/SR 3 north of the city. By the middle of 1950, the entire length of SR 3W was hard surfaced. By July 1957, SR 3 in the northern part of Albany was redesignated as SR 3 Conn. due to SR 3W being redesignated as part of SR 3.

== State Route 3W (Albany 1960–1973) ==
State Route 3W
- Location: Albany
- Existed: 1960–1973

State Route 3W (SR 3W) was a state highway that existed in the city of Albany. It traversed portions of Dougherty and Lee counties. At least as early as 1919, SR 3 traveled on essentially the same path through the city as it currently does. By the end of 1926, the segment from the Mitchell–Dougherty county line to Albany had a "completed hard surface". By the end of 1929, US 19 was designated on it through the Albany metropolitan area.

By the end of 1946, SR 3W was projected to be designated from the western part of Albany to US 19/SR 3 north of the city. By April 1949, the southern part of SR 3W was hard surfaced, while its northern part had completed grading, but was not surfaced. By the middle of 1950, the entire length of SR 3W was hard surfaced. By July 1957, SR 3 in the northern part of Albany was redesignated as SR 3 Conn. due to SR 3W being redesignated as part of SR 3. By June 1960, SR 3 Conn. was redesignated as part of the SR 3 mainline, and its old path was redesignated as the second SR 3W in the city. In 1973, SR 3W was redesignated as part of SR 3, while its former path was redesignated as part of SR 133.

== State Route 3W (Thomaston) ==
State Route 3W
- Location: Thomaston
- Existed: 1963–1987

State Route 3W (SR 3W) was a state highway that existed in the city of Thomaston, in Upson County. At least as early as 1919, SR 3 traveled on essentially the same path through the city as it currently does. By the end of 1926, the segment of SR 3 through Thomaston had a "completed hard surface". By the end of 1929, US 19 was designated on this segment. By June 1963, the path of SR 3 in Thomaston was split into SR 3W and SR 3E. It was unclear as to which highway US 19 traveled on. In 1987, SR 3W was redesignated as SR 3S.

== State Route 3E (Thomaston) ==
State Route 3E
- Location: Thomaston
- Existed: 1963–1987

State Route 3E (SR 3E) was a state highway that existed in the city of Thomaston, in Upson County. At least as early as 1919, SR 3 traveled on essentially the same path through the city as it currently does. By the end of 1926, the segment of SR 3 through Thomaston had a "completed hard surface". By the end of 1929, US 19 was designated on this segment. By June 1963, the path of SR 3 in Thomaston was split into SR 3W and SR 3E. It was unclear as to which highway US 19 traveled on. In 1987, SR 3E was redesignated as SR 3N.

== State Route 3N ==
State Route 3N
- Location: Thomaston
- Existed: 1987–1988

State Route 3N (SR 3N) was a short-lived state highway that existed in the city of Thomaston, in Upson County. At least as early as 1919, SR 3 traveled on essentially the same path through the city as it currently does. By the end of 1926, the segment of SR 3 through Thomaston had a "completed hard surface". By the end of 1929, US 19 was designated on this segment. By June 1963, the path of SR 3 in Thomaston was split into SR 3W and SR 3E. It was unclear as to which highway US 19 traveled on. In 1987, SR 3E was redesignated as SR 3N. In 1988, SR 3N in Thomaston was redesignated as the northbound lanes of SR 3.

== State Route 3S (Thomaston) ==
State Route 3S
- Location: Thomaston
- Existed: 1987–1988

State Route 3S (SR 3S) was a short-lived state highway that existed in the city of Thomaston, in Upson County. At least as early as 1919, SR 3 traveled on essentially the same path through the city as it currently does. By the end of 1926, the segment of SR 3 through Thomaston had a "completed hard surface". By the end of 1929, US 19 was designated on this segment. By June 1963, the path of SR 3 in Thomaston was split into SR 3W and SR 3E. It was unclear as to which highway US 19 traveled on. In 1987, SR 3W was redesignated as SR 3S. In 1988, SR 3S in Thomaston was redesignated as the southbound lanes of SR 3.

== State Route 3W (Atlanta–Marietta 1937–1946) ==
State Route 3W
- Location: Atlanta–Marietta
- Existed: 1937–1946

State Route 3W (SR 3W) was a state highway that existed in Atlanta and Marietta. It traversed portions of Fulton and Cobb counties. At least as early as 1919, SR 3 traveled on essentially the same path through this area as it currently does. By the end of 1926, US 41 had been designated on this segment of the highway. The Atlanta–Marietta segment had a "completed hard surface".

Late in 1937, SR 3 was split into two parts between Atlanta and the northwest part of Marietta. US 41/SR 3 traveled northwest on the original path, while SR 3E traveled north-northwest on a more eastern path between the two cities. By the end of the year, SR 3W was established, traveling northwest with US 41 on Marietta Street and Old Marietta Road. By the end of 1946, SR 3W was redesignated as part of the SR 3 mainline.

== State Route 3W (Atlanta–Marietta 1954–1955) ==
State Route 3W
- Location: Atlanta–Marietta
- Existed: 1954–1955

State Route 3W (SR 3W) was a short-lived state highway that existed in Atlanta and Marietta. It traversed portions of Fulton and Cobb counties. At least as early as 1919, SR 3 traveled on essentially the same path through these cities as it currently does. By the end of 1926, US 41 had been designated on this segment of SR 3. It had a "completed hard surface".

Late in 1937, SR 3 was split into two parts between Atlanta and the northwest part of Marietta. US 41/SR 3 traveled northwest on the original path, while SR 3E traveled north-northwest on a more eastern path between the two cities. By the end of the year, SR 3W was established, traveling northwest with US 41 on Marietta Street and Old Marietta Road, while SR 3E traveled north-northwest on Hemphill Street and Northside Drive. By the end of 1946, SR 3W was redesignated as part of the SR 3 mainline. By June 1954, the second SR 3W in this area was designated between the two cities. By June 1955, it was redesignated as part of SR 3.

== State Route 3E (Atlanta–Marietta) ==
State Route 3E
- Location: Atlanta–Marietta
- Existed: 1937–1985

State Route 3E (SR 3E) was a state highway that existed in Atlanta and Marietta. It traversed portions of Fulton and Cobb counties. At least as early as 1919, SR 3 traveled on essentially the same path through these two cities as it currently does. By the end of 1926, US 41 had been designated on this entire segment of SR 3, which had a "completed hard surface".

Late in 1937, SR 3 was split into two parts between Atlanta and the northwest part of Marietta. US 41/SR 3 traveled northwest on the original path, while SR 3E traveled north-northwest on a more eastern path between the two cities. SR 3E's path from SR 120 in the east part of Marietta to US 41/SR 3 in the northwestern part of the city. The rest of SR 3E was under construction. By the end of the year, SR 3W was established, traveling northwest with US 41 on Marietta Street and Old Marietta Road, while SR 3E traveled north-northwest on Hemphill Street and Northside Drive. All of SR 3E in the northern part of Atlanta was hard surfaced. From the north part of the city to the northwest part, the highway had completed grading, but was not surfaced. Later that year, all of SR 3E from Atlanta to northwest of the Fulton–Cobb county line had a completed hard surface.

In 1940, nearly the entire segment of SR 3E in Marietta had a completed hard surface. It was under construction from northwest of the Fulton–Cobb county line to the eastern part of Marietta. By the end of the next year, the entire length of SR 3E had a completed hard surface. By February 1948, SR 3E was moved off of Hemphill Avenue. It, along with US 41 Temp., followed US 19 on Spring Street, then traveled west on 14th Street and resumed the Northside Drive path. By April 1949, US 41 Temp./SR 3E's southbound lanes traveled on Hemphill Avenue. By the middle of 1950, US 41 Temp./SR 3E was shifted off of US 19 on Spring Street and 14th Street, and traveled on Hemphill Avenue again. In 1952, US 41 Temp. was redesignated as part of the US 41 mainline. In 1985, SR 3E was decommissioned.

== State Route 3S (Marietta) ==
State Route 3S
- Location: Marietta
- Existed: 1965–1980

State Route 3S (SR 3S) was a state highway that existed in the city limits of Marietta in Cobb County, Georgia. By the end of 1965, it was designated from SR 3 to SR 5. Between 1974 and March 1980, SR 3S was redesignated as SR 3 Spur.

== State Route 4 (1919–1929) ==
State Route 4
- Location: Alabama–Fairmount
- Length: 65.0 mi (104.6 km)
- Existed: 1919–1929

State Route 4 (SR 4) was a 65.0-mile-long (104.6 km) a state highway that was formed at least as early as 1919.

Route description

It began at the Alabama state line, traveled to the east-southeast and intersected SR 1 in Rome. It then curved to the southeast and began its concurrency with US 41 and SR 3 northwest of Cartersville. It then ended its concurrency with US 41 and SR 3 by turning north-northeast towards Fairmount. SR 4 then ended at SR 2/SR 53 in Fairmount.

History

By the end of 1921, SR 4 was extended southeast into the main part of Cartersville, on a concurrency with SR 3 and headed north-northeast to an intersection with SR 2/SR 53 in Fairmount. By the end of 1926, almost all of the Alabama–Rome segment, and the southern half of the 1921 extension, had a "sand clay or top soil" surface. In the vicinity of Rome, the highway had a "completed hard surface". About half of the Rome–Cartersville segment was under construction. The easternmost part of this segment, and nearly the entire SR 3 concurrency, had a "completed semi hard surface". By the end of 1929, the entire length of the original segment of SR 4 was redesignated as SR 20, with US 41W designated along the Rome–Cartersville segment. US 41 was designated along the former SR 3 concurrency. The 1921 extension was redesignated as SR 61. SR 4 was reused on that same day as a redesignation of parts of SR 15, SR 17, and SR 24.

Major intersections

This table represents SR 4's junctions in 1926.

County	Location	mi	km	Destinations	Notes
Georgia–Alabama state line		0.0	0.0	Western terminus; continuation into Alabama; present-day State Route 9 west	
Floyd	Rome	17.4	28.0	SR 1 – Summerville, Cedartown	
Bartow		38.5	62.0	US 41 north / SR 3 north – Adairsville, Calhoun	Western end of US 41 and SR 3 concurrencies
Bartow	Cartersville	43.4	69.8	US 41 south / SR 3 south – Marietta, Atlanta	Eastern end of US 41 and SR 3 concurrencies
Gordon	Fairmount	65.0	104.6	SR 2 / SR 53 – Calhoun, Chatsworth, Jasper, Ellijay	Eastern terminus
1.000 mi = 1.609 km; 1.000 km = 0.621 mi: Concurrency terminus; Route transition

== State Route 7W ==
State Route 7W
- Location: Cordele
- Existed: 1963–1985

State Route 7W (SR 7W) was a state highway that existed in the south-central part of the state. Between June 1960 and June 1963, the path of SR 7 through the Cordele area was split into SR 7W and SR 7E. SR 7W traveled through the western part of the city. In 1985, it was decommissioned.

Major intersections

The entire route was in Crisp County.

Location	mi	km	Destinations	Notes
			US 41 / SR 7 south / SR 7E north	Southern terminus of SR 7W and SR 7E; northern terminus of southern segment of SR 7
Cordele			US 280 / SR 30	
			US 41 / SR 7 north / SR 7E south	Northern terminus of SR 7W and SR 7E; southern terminus of northern segment of SR 7
1.000 mi = 1.609 km; 1.000 km = 0.621 mi

Browse numbered routes
← SR 7	GA	→ SR 7E

== State Route 7E ==
State Route 7E
- Location: Cordele
- Existed: 1963–1985

State Route 7E (SR 7E) was a state highway that existed in the south-central part of the state. Between June 1960 and June 1963, the path of SR 7 through the Cordele area was split into SR 7W and SR 7E. SR 7E traveled through the main part of the city, concurrent with US 41. In 1985, it was redesignated as part of the SR 7 mainline.

Major intersections

The entire route was in Crisp County.

Location	mi	km	Destinations	Notes
			US 41 / SR 7 south / SR 7W north	Southern terminus of SR 7W and SR 7E; northern terminus of southern segment of SR 7
Cordele			US 280 / SR 30	
Cordele			SR 257 north	Southern terminus of SR 257
			US 41 / SR 7 north / SR 7E south	Northern terminus of SR 7W and SR 7E; southern terminus of northern segment of SR 7
1.000 mi = 1.609 km; 1.000 km = 0.621 mi

Browse numbered routes
← SR 7W	GA	→ SR 8

== State Route 9E ==
State Route 9E
- Location: Coal Mountain–Dahlonega
- Length: 21.319 mi (34.310 km)
- Existed: 1941–1981

State Route 9E (SR 9E) was a 21.319-mile-long (34.310 km) state highway.

Route description

The routing that was followed by SR 9E starts where Hopewell Road splits from the current SR 9 north-northeast of Coal Mountain in Forsyth County, and parallels SR 400 very closely. The road changes names to Lumpkin Campground Road as it enters Dawson County, passes by the North Georgia Premium Outlet Mall, then crosses SR 53 and SR 400 in rapid succession. Just before intersecting with SR 136 the road changes names again to Harmony Church Road, then is called Auraria Road as it becomes SR 136. The road crosses SR 400 once more to its west, parts ways with SR 136, then travels north through the community of Auraria into Lumpkin County to its northern terminus at SR 9/SR 52 west of Dahlonega.

History

It was originally constructed early in 1941. In July 1981, as the extension of SR 400 had reached SR 60 south-southeast of Dahlonega, this designation was decommissioned.

== State Route 11E ==
State Route 11E
- Location: Bibb County
- Existed: 1953–1963

State Route 11E (SR 11E) was a state highway that existed entirely within Bibb County in the Macon metropolitan area. It functioned like an eastern alternate route of US 41/SR 11/SR 49. In 1953, it was established from US 41/SR 11/SR 49/SR 247 south-southwest of Macon to US 41/SR 11/SR 49 in the city. Between June 1960 and June 1963, SR 49 was shifted eastward, off of US 41/SR 11 and replacing SR 11E.

== State Route 13W ==
State Route 13W
- Location: Buckhead–Doraville
- Existed: 1946–1971

State Route 13W (SR 13W) was a state highway that existed in the Atlanta metropolitan area. Between the beginning of 1945 and November 1946, it was established from US 19/SR 9 north of Atlanta to the southwestern corner of North Atlanta. Between February 1948 and April 1949, its northern terminus was extended to US 23/SR 13 east-northeast of North Atlanta. In 1971, SR 13W was redesignated as part of SR 141 (Peachtree Road/Peachtree Industrial Boulevard) and SR 13 Conn.

Major intersections

County	Location	mi	km	Destinations	Notes
Fulton	Buckhead			US 19 / SR 9 (Peachtree Road)	Southern terminus
Fulton	Buckhead			SR 237 (Piedmont Road)	
DeKalb	Doraville			SR 141 north	Southern terminus of SR 141
DeKalb	Doraville			US 23 / SR 13 (Buford Highway)	Northern terminus
1.000 mi = 1.609 km; 1.000 km = 0.621 mi

Browse numbered routes
← SR 13	GA	→ SR 14

== State Route 15W ==
State Route 15W
- Location: Athens
- Existed: 1946–1949

State Route 15W (SR 15W) was a short-lived state highway that existed completely within the city limits of Athens. It functioned like a bypass of downtown. Between the beginning of 1945 and November 1946, it was established from US 129/US 441/SR 15/SR 24 north-northwest to US 129/SR 15. Between February 1948 and April 1949, the path of SR 15 was shifted westward, replacing SR 15W.

Major intersections

The entire route was in Athens, Clarke County.

mi	km	Destinations	Notes
		US 129 / US 441 / SR 15 / SR 24	Southern terminus
		US 29 / US 78 / SR 8 / SR 10	
		US 129 / SR 15	Northern terminus
1.000 mi = 1.609 km; 1.000 km = 0.621 mi

Browse numbered routes
← SR 15	GA	→ I-16

== State Route 16S ==
State Route 16S
- Location: Jefferson, Glascock, and Warren counties
- Existed: 1942–1952

State Route 16S (SR 16S) was a state highway that existed in portions of Jefferson, Glascock, and Warren counties. In 1942, it was established from an intersection with SR 16 west-northwest of Wrens to another intersection with SR 16 southeast of Warrenton. A decade later, the path of SR 16 southeast of Warrenton was shifted southward, replacing the path of SR 16S. The portion from southeast of Warrenton to northwest of Wrens was redesignated as SR 16 Conn., while the portion from northwest of Wrens to north of Louisville was redesignated as SR 16 Conn.

Major intersections

County	Location	mi	km	Destinations	Notes
Jefferson				SR 16	Southern terminus
Glascock	No major junctions				
Warren				SR 16	Northern terminus
1.000 mi = 1.609 km; 1.000 km = 0.621 mi

Browse numbered routes
← SR 16	GA	→ US 17

== State Route 20 (1919–1921) ==
State Route 20
- Location: Gray–Sparta
- Length: 46.2 mi (74.4 km)
- Existed: 1919–1921

State Route 20 (SR 20) was a very short-lived state highway that traveled from Gray to Sparta. It was formed at least as early as 1919 and was decommissioned in 1921 and redesignated SR 22. It began at an intersection with SR 11 in Gray. It traveled to the east-northeast and entered Milledgeville, where it intersected SR 24 and SR 29. It then went northeast to Sparta, where it met its eastern terminus, an intersection with SR 15 and SR 16. SR 20 was reused that same year on a different road (see below).

Major intersections

County	Location	mi	km	Destinations	Notes
Jones	Gray	0.0	0.0	SR 11	Western terminus
Baldwin	Milledgeville	20.7	33.3	SR 24 west / SR 29 south	Western end of SR 24 concurrency, northern terminus of SR 29
Baldwin		25.1	40.4	SR 24 west / SR 29 south	Eastern end of SR 24 concurrency
Hancock	Sparta	46.2	74.4	SR 15 / SR 16	Eastern terminus
1.000 mi = 1.609 km; 1.000 km = 0.621 mi: Concurrency terminus

== State Route 20 (1921–1929) ==
State Route 20
- Location: Louisville–Waynesboro
- Length: 24.0 mi (38.6 km)
- Existed: 1921–1929

State Route 20 (SR 20) was a 24.0-mile-long (38.6 km) state highway in the east-central part of the state. At least as early as 1919, part of SR 24 was established from Louisville to Waynesboro. By the end of September 1921, the path of SR 24, from Waynesboro to Louisville, was shifted northwestward. The former path of SR 24 was redesignated as SR 20. Between October 1926 and October 1929, the path of SR 24, from Augusta to Louisville, was reverted to the Waynesboro–Louisville path, replacing SR 20. SR 24's former path, on US 1, was redesignated as part of SR 4. SR 20 was reused on that same day as a redesignation of most of the original SR 4.

Major intersections

County	Location	mi	km	Destinations	Notes
Jefferson	Louisville	0.0	0.0	US 1 / SR 17 / SR 24 – Swainsboro, Sandersville, Wrens	Western terminus
Burke		22.6	36.4	SR 56 south – Midville, Swainsboro	Northern terminus of SR 56
Burke	Waynesboro	24.0	38.6	SR 21	Eastern terminus
1.000 mi = 1.609 km; 1.000 km = 0.621 mi

== State Route 26E ==
State Route 26E
- Location: Tybee Island
- Existed: 1969–1985

State Route 26E (SR 26E) was a state highway that existed in the eastern part of Chatham County, in Savannah Beach, which is what Tybee Island was known as at the time. The roadway that would eventually become SR 26E was established between June 1963 and the end of 1965, as SR 26 Loop, between two intersections with US 80/SR 26 in the southern part of the city. In 1969, it was redesignated as SR 26E. In 1985, SR 26E was decommissioned.

The entire route was in Savannah Beach, Chatham County.

mi	km	Destinations	Notes
		US 80 / SR 26	Western terminus
		US 80 / SR 26	Eastern terminus
1.000 mi = 1.609 km; 1.000 km = 0.621 mi

Browse numbered routes
← SR 26	GA	→ US 27

== State Route 27S ==
State Route 27S
- Location: Dodge County
- Existed: 1965–1977

State Route 27S (SR 27S) was a state highway that existed in the central part of Dodge County, southwest of Eastman. Between June 1963 and the end of 1965, it was established from US 341/SR 27 west of Eastman to US 23/US 341/SR 27 southeast of the city. In 1977, it became the new route of US 341/SR 27.

The entire route was in Dodge County.

Location	mi	km	Destinations	Notes
			US 341 / SR 27	Western terminus
			US 23 / US 341 / SR 27	Eastern terminus
1.000 mi = 1.609 km; 1.000 km = 0.621 mi

Browse numbered routes
← SR 27	GA	→ SR 28

== State Route 28 (1919–1937) ==
State Route 28
- Location: Georgetown–Vienna
- Existed: 1919–1937

State Route 28 (SR 28) was a state highway that traveled from Georgetown to Vienna. It was established at least as early as 1919 and was decommissioned in 1937. It began at an intersection with SR 39 in Georgetown. It traveled to the northeast and intersected SR 1 in Lumpkin. It curved to the east-southeast through Preston. In Americus, the highway intersected SR 3 and SR 26. It headed to the east and entered Vienna, where it met its eastern terminus, an intersection with SR 7. By the end of 1926, a segment just east of Preston was under construction. The eastern half of the Preston–Americus segment had a completed hard surface. The Dooly County portion of the highway had a sand clay or topsoil surface. By the end of 1929, a segment just east of Lumpkin and a segment just west of Preston had a sand clay or topsoil surface. By the middle of 1930, SR 28 was extended northeast from Vienna to Hawkinsville. A few months later, the Richland–Preston segment was under construction. By 1932, US 280 was designated on the Richland–Americus segment. Near the end of the year, the entire Vienna–Hawkinsville segment had a sand clay or topsoil surface. By the end of 1937, s segment just southwest of Hawkinsville had a completed hard surface. Just a few months later, all of SR 28 had been redesignated as SR 27. This was done so that SR 28 could be reused on former SR 52 and SR 105 to match South Carolina.

== State Route 34 (1919–1926) ==
State Route 34
- Location: Carrollton–Villa Rica
- Existed: 1919–1926

State Route 34 (SR 34) was a short-lived state highway in the western part of the state. It was established at least as early as 1919 and was decommissioned in 1926. When it was established, it extended from SR 1 and SR 16 in Carrollton to SR 8 in Villa Rica. In 1926, its entire length consisted of a "sand clay or top soil" surface and was redesignated as a southern branch of SR 8. Within three years, US 78S had been designated along the path of SR 8's southern branch. A decade later, US 78S had been redesignated as US 78 Alt. Nearly another decade later, SR 8 had been redesignated as SR 8 Alt. By the beginning of 1953, US 78 Alt. had been decommissioned. By the middle of 1954, SR 8 Alt. had been redesignated as SR 166 from Carrollton to northeast of the city and SR 61 from that point to Villa Rica, as they travel today. SR 34 was reused in 1930 along part of its current route.

== State Route 36 (1919–1941) ==
State Route 36
- Location: Commerce–South Carolina state line east-southeast of Elberton
- Existed: 1919–1941

State Route 36 (SR 36) was a state highway that originally existed from Danielsville to Elberton, when it was established at least as early as 1919. By the middle of 1930, its western terminus was shifted southwestward into Athens. By the end of the year, the western terminus had been reverted to Danielsville and extended northwest to Commerce. The Athens–Comer segment was redesignated as SR 82. In 1941, SR 82 west of Comer and the Comer–South Carolina segment of SR 36 had been redesignated as SR 72, while the Commerce–Comer segment of SR 36 had been redesignated as an extension of SR 98. That same day, the old SR 72 was redesignated as SR 36.

== State Route 42A ==
State Route 42A
- Location: Atlanta
- Existed: 1941–1946

State Route 42A (SR 42A) was a state highway in Atlanta. It was entirely concurrent with US 29/US 78/SR 8/SR 10/SR 12 (Ponce de Leon Avenue). It was formed in 1941 and decommissioned only five years later, in 1946. It began at an intersection with US 19/SR 9 in the northern part of the city. From there, US 29/US 78/SR 8/SR 10/SR 12/SR 42A traveled to the east to an intersection with SR 42. Here, SR 42A ended, and US 29/US 78/SR 8/SR 10/SR 12 continued to the east.

Browse numbered routes
← SR 42	GA	→ SR 43

== State Route 43 (1919–1941) ==
State Route 43
- Location: Hall, White, and Lumpkin counties
- Existed: 1919–1941

State Route 43 (SR 43) was a state highway that originally existed from a point north-northwest of Gainesville, north-northeast to Cleveland, and then northwest to Turners Corner, when it was established at least as early as 1919. Its original southern terminus was at SR 11 north-northwest of Gainesville, and its original northern terminus was at SR 9 in Turners Corner. By the end of 1921, SR 11 and SR 43 were swapped in this area. SR 11 took over the entire route of SR 43, while SR 43 was shifted to travel from a point north-northeast of Gainesville northwest to SR 9 just northeast of Dahlonega. By the end of 1926, the southern part of the new path had a sand clay or top soil surface, and the rest of it had a completed semi hard surface. By the end of 1929, the Lumpkin County portion of the highway had a completed hard surface. By the middle of the next year, all of the highway was completed. In 1941, SR 43 was redesignated as SR 52. Note that SR 43 was reused on former SR 70 to match South Carolina that same day.

== State Route 44 (1919–1921) ==
State Route 44
- Location: Alabama state line northwest of Jakin–Brinson
- Existed: 1919–1921

State Route 44 (SR 44) was a short-lived state highway that only existed from the Alabama state line, northwest of Jakin, to Brinson. It was established at least as early as 1919, and was decommissioned by the end of 1921. It was redesignated as part of SR 38. SR 44 was reused in 1921 along part of its current route.

County	Location	mi	km	Destinations	Notes
Houston	Chattahoochee River			Western terminus; continuation into Alabama; present-day US 84 / SR 12 west	
Early	No major junctions				
Seminole	No major junctions				
Decatur	Brinson			SR 1 – Bainbridge, Colquitt	Eastern terminus
1.000 mi = 1.609 km; 1.000 km = 0.621 mi: Route transition

== State Route 45 (1919–1926) ==
State Route 45
- Location: Avondale Estates–west-southwest of Athens
- Existed: 1919–1926

State Route 45 (SR 45) was a short-lived state highway in the north-central part of the state. It was established at least as early as 1919 on a path from SR 8 and SR 13 in Lawrenceville, south-southeast to Loganville, east-southeast to SR 11 in Monroe, and east-northeast to SR 15 in Watkinsville. By the end of 1921, the Lawrenceville–Loganville segment was redesignated as a southern extension of SR 13, the western terminus was extended west-southwest to what was known as "Ingleside" (now known as Avondale Estates), and the eastern terminus was shifted to the northwest to end at SR 8 west-southwest of Athens. By the end of 1926, the segment from Ingleside (now labeled as "Avondale") to Loganville and the segment from Monroe to the Athens area were redesignated as US 78/SR 10, while the Loganville–Monroe segment was also redesignated as US 78 and SR 13 (and possibly SR 10). SR 45 was reused in 1930 along part of its current route.

== State Route 46 (1919–1921) ==
State Route 46
- Location: Sylvester–Tifton
- Existed: 1919–1921

State Route 46 (SR 46) was a short-lived state highway that started at SR 32 and SR 33 in Sylvester to SR 7 and SR 35 in Tifton. It was established at least as early as 1919. By the end of 1921, the entire highway was redesignated as part of SR 50. SR 46 was reused in 1921 along part of its current route.

== State Route 50N ==
State Route 50N
- Location: Albany
- Existed: 1963–1973

State Route 50N (SR 50N) was a state highway that existed in the city limits of Albany, within Dougherty County. The roadway that would eventually become SR 50N was established at least as early as 1919 as SR 32 from Dawson through Albany and into Sylvester. By the end of 1921, SR 50 was designated across the state. This truncated SR 32 at Ashburn. By the end of 1926, the portion of SR 50 in the eastern part of Albany had a "completed hard surface".

By the middle of 1930, from west of Albany to the Worth–Tift county line, the highway had a completed hard surface. The western half of the Dougherty County portion of the Dawson–Albany segment had a completed semi hard surface. In January 1932, the Dawson–Albany segment had a completed hard surface.

Between February 1948 and April 1949, US 82 was designated on SR 50 through the Albany area. Between June 1960 and June 1963, the path of SR& 50 through Albany was split into SR 50N and SR 50S. SR 50N used Broad Avenue and Sylvester Road, while US 82/SR 50S used Oglethorpe Avenue and Albany Expressway. In 1973, SR 50N was redesignated as SR 50 Conn., while SR 50S was redesignated as the SR 50 mainline.

== State Route 50S ==
State Route 50S
- Location: Albany
- Existed: 1963–1973

State Route 50S (SR 50S) was a state highway that existed in the city limits of Albany, within Dougherty County. The roadway that would eventually become SR 50S was established at least as early as 1919 as SR 32 from Dawson through Albany and into Sylvester. By the end of 1921, SR 50 was designated across the state. This truncated SR 32 at Ashburn. By the end of 1926, the portion of SR 50 in the eastern part of Albany had a "completed hard surface".

By the middle of 1930, from west of Albany to the Worth–Tift county line, the highway had a completed hard surface. The western half of the Dougherty County portion of the Dawson–Albany segment had a completed semi hard surface. In January 1932, the Dawson–Albany segment had a completed hard surface.

Between February 1948 and April 1949, US 82 was designated on SR 50 through the Albany area. Between June 1960 and June 1963, the path of SR& 50 through Albany was split into SR 50N and SR 50S. SR 50N used Broad Avenue and Sylvester Road, while US 82/SR 50S used Oglethorpe Avenue and Albany Expressway. In 1973, SR 50N was redesignated as SR 50 Conn., while SR 50S was redesignated as the SR 50 mainline.

== State Route 51 (1919–1921) ==
State Route 51
- Location: Blue Ridge–Tennessee
- Existed: 1919–1921

State Route 51 (SR 51) was a state highway in Fannin County. Between 1919 and 1920, SR 51 was designated from Blue Ridge to the Tennessee state line. By the end of 1921, the entire highway was redesignated as part of SR 5. Note that the SR 51 number was reused in 1921 along part of the current highway.

== State Route 52 (1921–1937) ==
State Route 52
- Location: Columbia–Richmond counties
- Existed: 1921–1937

State Route 52 (SR 52) was a state highway in Columbia and Richmond counties, in the Augusta metropolitan area. Between 1919 and 1921, SR 52 was designated from the South Carolina state line, northwest of Augusta, and the South Carolina state line again on the northeastern edge of the city. Before 1926 ended, the entire length of SR 52 had a "sand clay or top soil" surface. By the middle of 1930, in an area northwest of Augusta, SR 52 was shifted to a more western alignment. This segment was located about half of the distance from the Columbia–Richmond county line and the original segment. The original part northwest of the split did not have a highway number. The highway had a "completed hard surface" from there to Augusta. The year ended with all of SR 52 having a "completed hard surface". The original part's Richmond County portion did, too. By February 1932, the entire length of the highway had a completed hard surface. Near the end of the year, the northwestern part of SR 52 was shifted back to its original alignment and re-signed as SR 52. The western extended part was re-designated as SR 104. Before 1938, all of SR 52 was redesignated as the southern segment of SR 28.

== State Route 54B ==
State Route 54B
- Location: Sharpsburg–Fayetteville
- Existed: 1921–1934

State Route 54B (SR 54B) was a state highway just south of Atlanta. When it was established in between 1919 and 1921, it extended from an intersection with SR 16 in Sharpsburg northeast to an intersection with SR 54 in Fayetteville. By the end of 1926, the northern half had a sand clay or top soil surface. Nearly a decade later, the entire length of SR 54B was redesignated as a re-routing of the SR 54 mainline.

Browse numbered routes
← SR 54	GA	→ SR 55

== State Route 56 Spur ==
State Route 56 Spur
- Location: Augusta
- Length: 6.6 mi (10.6 km)
- Existed: 2014

State Route 56 Spur (SR 56 Spur) was a 6.6-mile-long (10.6 km) spur route that existed entirely within the southeastern part of Richmond County. Its route was entirely within the city limits of Augusta. Its west–east section was part of Tobacco Road. It was known as Doug Barnard Parkway for the rest of its length. Its entire length was within the city limits of Augusta. Its southern terminus was at an intersection with the SR 56 mainline (Mike Padgett Highway). Its northern terminus was at an intersection with US 1/US 25/US 78/US 278/SR 10/SR 121 (Gordon Highway) in downtown Augusta. Here, the roadway continues as Molly Pond Road. The highway was decommissioned in 2014.

== State Route 60 (1921–1926) ==
State Route 60
- Location: Sterling
- Existed: 1921–1926

State Route 60 (SR 60) was a short-lived state highway in the southeastern part of the state. When it was established between 1919 and 1921, it extended from SR 27 in Sterling northeast to an intersection with SR 25 south-southwest of Darien. By the end of 1926, the highway was removed from the state highway system. This short segment of highway would later be used as part of SR 131 in 1939, in which this section became part of SR 99, and SR 131 was shifted further north.

== State Route 60 (1930–1940) ==
State Route 60
- Location: Social Circle
- Existed: 1930–1940

State Route 60 (SR 60) was a very short state highway that existed entirely within Walton County. The roadway that would eventually become SR 60 was built between 1921 and the end of 1926 as an unnumbered road from SR 11 in Social Circle to SR 12 southeast of the city. The entire length of the highway had a "sand clay or top soil" surface. In 1930, this road was designated as SR 60. At the end of 1940, SR 60 was redesignated as SR 181. It later became SR 213 one year later. This portion became part of SR 229, which along with SR 213, was decommissioned in the 1980s. SR 60 was reused as a renumbering of former SR 86, and SR 86 was reused to renumber the duplicate SR 160.

== State Route 62 (1926–1929) ==
State Route 62
- Location: Talmo–Homer
- Existed: 1926–1929

State Route 62 (SR 62) was a short-lived state highway in the northeastern part of the state. It was proposed between 1919 and 1921 on a path from SR 11 at a point northwest of Jefferson, at approximately the location of Talmo, northeast to SR 15 in Homer. By the end of 1926, SR 62 was established on this same path, with US 129 having been applied onto SR 11. Within three years, this short highway had been decommissioned.

== State Route 63 (1921–1967) ==
State Route 63
- Location: Fancy Hall–Pembroke
- Length: 38.2 mi (61.5 km)
- Existed: 1921–1967

State Route 63 (SR 63) was a state highway that existed in the east-central part of the state. When it was established between 1919 and 1921, it only extended from SR 30 in Ellabell to SR 26 at a point that approximates today's location of Eden. By the end of 1926, its termini were shifted to SR 30 in Lanier to US 80/SR 26 in Blitchton. By the end of 1929, the highway's western portion had a "sand clay or top soil" surface, while its eastern portion was under construction. Also, the western terminus was shifted again, to Pembroke. The next year, the eastern portion had a sand clay or top soil surface. At the end of the year, US 280 was designated along the entire path of SR 63. Before 1934 ended, the western portion had completed grading, but was not surfaced. Just a few months later the eastern portion of SR 63 was under the same condition. About six months later, the eastern terminus area had a completed hard surface. Near the end of 1936, the rest of the highway also had a completed hard surface. About a year later, SR 30's length southeast of Pembroke was swapped with the entire length of SR 63. That meant that SR 63 easternmost terminus was now at US 17/SR 25 southeast of Clyde. The portion of this "new" path just southeast of Pembroke, as well as the entire segment southeast of Clyde, was under construction. Within a year, those under construction segments had completed grading, but were not surfaced. By the middle of 1939, a small portion of the highway farther to the southeast of Pembroke had the same conditions. Before the year ended, the rest of the highway's length also had the same conditions. A few months later, most of the highway's length that today is within the boundaries of Fort Stewart was under construction. Later in 1940, the segment from US 17/SR 25 to SR 144 southeast of Clyde had a completed hard surface. About five years later, Fort Stewart was established. Most of the state highways that traveled within the area now covered by the base were removed. Due to this, SR 63 was split into two short segments: one from the northern edge of the base to Pembroke and one from Richmond Hill to the southeastern edge of the base. By the end of 1948, state highways were re-established through the base, thereby reconnecting SR 63 as a single highway. One year later, the eastern terminus of the highway was extended south-southeast to Fancy Hall. Before 1953 ended, the Keller–Richmond Hill segment was hard surfaced. In 1954, the segment from the northern edge of Fort Stewart to Pembroke was hard surfaced. At the end of the decade, the Fancy Hall–Keller segment was paved. Before 1966 began SR 63 Spur had been established from SR 63 southeast of Richmond Hill east to Fort McAllister. In 1967, SR 67's path south of Pembroke was shifted to the east, taking over the entire path of SR 63; therefore, SR 63 Spur was redesignated as SR 67 Spur.

Major intersections

This table represents SR 63's junctions in 1966. The entire route was in Bryan County.

Location	mi	km	Destinations	Notes
Fancy Hall	0.0	0.0	Southern terminus	
	8.9	14.3	SR 63 Spur east – Fort McAllister	Western terminus of SR 63 Spur
			US 17 / SR 25	
Fort Stewart	18.4	29.6	SR 144 west	Eastern terminus of SR 144
Pembroke	38.2	61.5	US 280 (SR 30 / Bacon Street) / SR 321 north	Northern terminus, southern terminus of SR 321
1.000 mi = 1.609 km; 1.000 km = 0.621 mi

=== State Route 63 Spur ===
State Route 63 Spur
- Location: Southeast of Richmond Hill–Fort McAllister
- Existed: 1966–1967

State Route 63 Spur (SR 63 Spur) was a short-lived spur route of SR 63. Before 1966 began, SR 63 Spur was established from the SR 63 mainline southeast of Richmond Hill east to Fort McAllister. In 1967, SR 67's path south of Pembroke was shifted to the east, taking over the entire path of SR 63; therefore, SR 63 Spur was redesignated as SR 67 Spur. In the middle 1970s, SR 144 was extended east and south-southeast, taking over the route of SR 67 southeast of Fort Stewart; therefore, SR 67 was redesignated as SR 144 Spur.

== State Route 63 (1968–1986) ==
State Route 63
- Location: Glennville, Georgia
- Existed: 1968–1986

State Route 63 (SR 63) went from SR 144 to SR 196. This was cancelled in 1986. It does not show on any official GDOT state maps, but is on some online maps. The SR 63 was reused in 1989 along the current highway.

== State Route 65 (1921–1926) ==
State Route 65
- Location: Rabun County
- Existed: 1921–1926

State Route 65 (SR 65) was a state highway that formerly exited in the extreme northeastern part of the state. At least as early as 1919, a local road was established between the North Carolina and South Carolina state lines in Rabun County. By 1921, this road was designated as SR 65. By the end of 1926, this was cancelled. In 1932, this route was restored as SR 105. This roadway would eventually be redesignated as the northern segment of SR 28. SR 65 was reused on an unrelated route (no longer part of the current route) in 1932.

== State Route 68 (1921–1932) ==
State Route 68
- Location: Cumming–Buford
- Existed: 1921–January 1932

State Route 68 (SR 68) was a short-lived state highway in the north-central part of the state. When it was established between 1919 and 1921, it extended from SR 9 in Cumming southeast to SR 13 in Buford. In January 1932, SR 68 was decommissioned and redesignated as part of SR 20. SR 68 was reused for part of its current route by March 1932.

== State Route 69 ==
State Route 69
- Location: Northern Towns County
- Length: 1.1 mi (1.8 km)
- Existed: 1930–1960

State Route 69 (SR 69) was a very short state highway located entirely within northern Towns County in the extreme northern part of the state. The highway traveled from US 76/SR 2 north to the North Carolina state line, where it became North Carolina Highway 69 (NC 69). SR 69 followed the roadway currently designated as the concurrency of SR 17/SR 515. It was formed in 1930, and was redesignated as part of SR 17 between 1957 and 1960.

Between 1919 and 1921, the roadway that would eventually become SR 69 was established as an unnumbered road from SR 2 in Hiawassee to the North Carolina state line north of Hiawassee. By the end of 1930, this road was designated as SR 69, with a completed semi hard surface. A few years later, the highway's location was shifted a few miles to the west. Its southern terminus was still at SR 2, but began northwest of Hiawassee, as it currently travels. By the end of 1935, the highway had a completed hard surface. Twenty years later, SR 17 north of US 76/SR 2 was shifted to the west to travel concurrently with SR 69. Between 1957 and 1960, SR 69 was decommissioned, while SR 17 stayed on this segment of highway.

Major intersections

This table represents SR 69's junctions in 1950. The entire route was in Towns County.

Location	mi	km	Destinations	Notes
	0.0	0.0	US 76	Southern terminus
	0.9	1.4	Crooked Creek Road west – Warne	Modern-day SR 339 west
	1.1	1.8	NC 69 north – Hayesville	Continuation into North Carolina
1.000 mi = 1.609 km; 1.000 km = 0.621 mi

Browse numbered routes
← SR 68	GA	→ SR 70

== State Route 70 (1932–1941) ==
State Route 70
- Location: Lincolnton
- Existed: 1932–1941

State Route 70 (SR 70) was a state highway that existed in the east-central part of the state. When it was established between 1930 and 1932, it extended from Lincolnton to the South Carolina state line. At this time, the highway was under construction. In early 1934, SR 70 was extended south-southwest to US 78/SR 10/SR 17 north-northwest of Thomson. By the end of 1937, the segment of SR 70 from Lincolnton to the South Carolina state line had a "sand clay or top soil" surface. In 1938, a small portion of the highway southwest of Lincolnton had a "completed hard surface". Late in 1941, all of SR 70 was redesignated as SR 43 to match South Carolina. SR 70 was not reused until 1968, when a county road and part of SR 74 was renumbered to SR 70.

== State Route 72 (1930–1941) ==
State Route 72
- Location: Woodland–Covington
- Existed: 1930–1941

State Route 72 (SR 72) was a state highway in the west-central and central parts of the state. It was established in 1930 on a path from US 19/SR 3 north-northwest of Thomaston to SR 18 in Barnesville. Later that year, the western terminus was shifted southward into Thomaston. At the end of 1933, SR 72 was extended northeast to Jackson. A few months later, it was extended again, this time north-northeast to Covington. Three years later, the entire length of the Thomaston–Barnesville segment had a "completed hard surface". Later that year, SR 72 was extended southwest to SR 41 in Woodland. The next year, the eastern terminus was under construction. By the middle of 1939, the then-western terminus had a completed hard surface. At this time, the then-eastern terminus had a "sand clay or top soil" surface. Near the end of 1940, SR 72 was extended north-northwest along SR 41 to Manchester and then west-northwest to SR 85 in Warm Springs. It was possibly also extended west-southwest to US 27/SR 1 in Pine Mountain, but GDOT maps didn't show a highway number for this segment of highway. The entire extension had a completed hard surface. Meanwhile, the eastern terminus was under construction. By the end of the year, the eastern terminus had a completed hard surface. A few months later, the entire Newton County portion that didn't have a hard surface was under construction. By the end of 1941, the entire highway was redesignated as SR 36. The Newton County portion that didn't have a hard surface had completed grading, but was not surfaced. SR 72 was reused as a renumbering of most of old SR 36 and part of SR 82 to match South Carolina. The rest of SR 36 became an extension of SR 98.

== State Route 73W ==
State Route 73W
- Location: Bulloch County
- Existed: 1960–1993

State Route 73W (SR 73W) was a state highway that existed in the southwestern part of Bulloch County. Between July 1957 and June 1960, it was established and paved between two intersections with US 25/US 301/SR 73. It traveled north-northwest to an intersection with SR 46 and then northeast to its northern terminus. In 1993, it was decommissioned.

The entire route was in Bulloch County.

Location	mi	km	Destinations	Notes
			US 25 / US 301 / SR 73 south / SR 73E north	Southern terminus of SR 73W and SR 73E; northern terminus of southern segment of SR 73
			SR 46	
			US 25 / US 301 / SR 73 north / SR 73E south	Northern terminus of SR 73W and SR 73E; southern terminus of northern segment of SR 73
1.000 mi = 1.609 km; 1.000 km = 0.621 mi

Browse numbered routes
← SR 73	GA	→ SR 73E

== State Route 73E ==
State Route 73E
- Location: Bulloch County
- Existed: 1960–1993

State Route 73E (SR 73E) was a state highway that existed in the southwestern part of Bulloch County. Between July 1957 and June 1960, it was established on US 25/US 301 as a redesignation of SR 73. It straddled the intersection with SR 46/SR 119. In 1993, it was reverted to be part of SR 73.

Major intersections

The entire route was in Bulloch County.

Location	mi	km	Destinations	Notes
			US 25 / US 301 / SR 73 south / SR 73W north	Southern terminus of SR 73W and SR 73E; northern terminus of southern segment of SR 73
			SR 46 / SR 119	
			US 25 / US 301 / SR 73 north / SR 73W south	Northern terminus of SR 73W and SR 73E; southern terminus of northern segment of SR 73
1.000 mi = 1.609 km; 1.000 km = 0.621 mi

Browse numbered routes
← SR 73W	GA	→ SR 74

== State Route 85W ==
State Route 85W
- Location: South of Shiloh–Woodbury
- Existed: 1952–1995

State Route 85W (SR 85W) was a state highway that existed from south of Shiloh to Woodbury. The highway that would eventually become SR 85W was established in 1930 as part of SR 85 from south of Shiloh to SR 41 in Warm Springs. By the middle of 1933, the portion of the highway from south of Shiloh to Warm Springs had a "sand clay or top soil" surface. The next year, the segment of the highway just south-southwest of Warm Springs was shifted westward to a curve into the city. At the end of 1936, two segments were under construction: around Shiloh and just west-southwest of Warm Springs. By the middle of 1937, a portion from south of Shiloh to Warm Springs was under construction. Near the end of the year, part of the Waverly Hall–Warm Springs segment had completed grading, but was not surfaced. By the end of 1939, the segment from south of Shiloh to Warm Springs had a completed hard surface.

In 1940, SR 163 was built from Warm Springs to Woodbury. By the middle of 1941, SR 163's segment just northeast of Warm Springs was under construction. In 1942, a portion of SR 163 northeast of Warm Springs had completed grading, but was not surfaced. By the end of 1946, SR 85 was shifted eastward to a more direct path between Columbus and Manchester. Its old path between south of Shiloh and Warm Springs was redesignated as a southerly extension of SR 163.

By the middle of 1950, US 27 Alt. was designated on SR 163 from south of Shiloh to Warm Springs. By 1952, SR 163 was redesignated as SR 85W. That year, SR 85W's segment south of Warm Springs was reverted to being designated as SR 163. The next year, this was undone. Also, the segment of SR 85W from Warm Springs to Woodbury had completed grading, but was not surfaced.

Between 1960 and 1963, US 27 Alt. was shifted eastward onto SR 85E from south of Shiloh to Manchester. About thirty-three years later, SR 85W was redesignated SR 85 Alt.

== State Route 85E ==
State Route 85E
- Location: South of Shiloh–Woodbury
- Existed: 1957–1995

State Route 85E (SR 85E) was a state highway between south of Shiloh and Woodbury. In 1935, SR 85 was extended southeast on SR 41 to Manchester and then north-northeast through Woodbury. At the end of 1936, part of SR 85 around Shiloh was under construction.

In 1940, SR 85, from Manchester to approximately halfway between it and Woodbury, was under construction. At the end of 1941, a portion of SR 85 just east-northeast of Manchester had a completed hard surface. At this time, a portion of the highway from south of Woodbury had completed grading, but was not surfaced. In 1943, a portion northeast of Manchester had a completed hard surface. The next year, a portion south of Woodbury had a sand clay or top soil surface. By the end of 1946, SR 85 was shifted eastward to a more direct path between Columbus and Manchester. Its old path between south of Shiloh and Warm Springs was redesignated as a southerly extension of SR 163. The entire length of SR 85 from south of Shiloh to Chalybeate Springs had a completed hard surface. A small portion north-northeast of Chalybeate Springs had a sand clay or top soil surface; the portion from there to Woodbury had a completed hard surface. Between 1946 and 1948, the Chalybeate Springs–Woodbury segment had a completed hard surface.

Between 1955 and 1957, SR 85 from south of Shiloh to Woodbury was redesignated as SR 85E. Between 1960 and 1963, US 27 Alt. was shifted eastward onto SR 85E from south of Shiloh to Manchester. About thirty-two years later, SR 85E was redesignated as part of the SR 85 mainline again.

== State Route 86 (1930–1940) ==
State Route 86
- Location: Lumpkin–Fannin counties
- Existed: 1930–1940

State Route 86 (SR 86) was a short-lived state highway in the North Georgia mountains region of the north-central part of the state. In 1930, SR 86 was established from Blue Ridge northeast to the North Carolina state line west-northwest of Ivy Log. In January 1932, the entire length of SR 86 was under construction. The next month, the western terminus of SR 86 was shifted eastward to begin northwest of Morganton. By mid-1933, the portion of SR 86 from northwest of Morganton to Mineral Bluff had a "sand clay or top soil" surface. Later that year, the entire length of SR 86 had a completed semi hard surface. In 1936, the entire length of SR 86 was under construction. At the beginning of 1937, SR 86 was extended southeast to US 19/SR 9 in Porter Springs. A few months later, SR 86's original segment had completed grading, but was not surfaced. In late 1940, all of SR 86 was renumbered SR 60. About 37 years later, the original segment of SR 86, from Mineral Bluff to the state line was used for the path of SR 60 Spur, because SR 60 was rerouted over SR 245, which was cancelled. SR 86 was reused that same day as a renumbering of the duplicate SR 160.

== State Route 91W ==
State Route 91W
- Location: Dougherty County
- Existed: 1946–1973

State Route 91W (SR 91W) was a state highway in the southwestern part of the U.S. state of Georgia. It functioned like an alternate route of SR 91. Between the beginning of 1945 and November 1946, it was established from SR 91 south-southwest of Albany to SR 3W just west of the city. By February 1948, the entire length of the highway was hard surfaced. In 1973, SR 234 was extended to the east, absorbing all of SR 91W.

Browse numbered routes
← SR 91	GA	→ SR 92

== State Route 105 (1932–1937) ==
State Route 105
- Location: Rabun County
- Existed: 1932–1937

State Route 105 (SR 105) was a state highway that existed entirely within Rabun County in the northeastern part of the state. The road that would eventually become SR 105 was established at least as early as 1919 between the North Carolina and South Carolina state lines. By 1921, the highway was signed as SR 65. This SR 65 was cancelled in 1926. SR 105 was designated in late 1932. By the end of 1934, the entire length of SR 105 was under construction. By the middle of 1937, SR 105 had completed grading, but was not surfaced. Before 1938, all of SR 105 was redesignated as the northern segment of SR 28. SR 105 was reused on an unrelated route in 1938 (no longer part of its current route).

== State Route 131 ==
State Route 131
- Location: Glynn–McIntosh counties
- Existed: 1936–1989

State Route 131 (SR 131) was a state highway that was located in Glynn and McIntosh counties in the coastal part of the state. The highway that would eventually become SR 131 was established between 1919 and 1921 as SR 60 from SR 27 north-northwest of Brunswick to SR 25 south-southwest of Darien. By the end of 1926, it was decommissioned. SR 131 was established in 1936 on what is currently SR 99 on an eastern curve between intersections with US 17/SR 25 in Darien and Eulonia. Later that year, the portion from Darien to approximately Meridian was under construction. In 1938, this segment had a "completed hard surface". From approximately Meridian to approximately Valona, the highway had completed grading, but was not surfaced. In late 1939, SR 131 was established on a segment from US 84/SR 50 west-northwest of Brunswick to SR 32 northwest of Brunswick and on a segment from US 25/US 341/SR 27 southwest of Darien to US 17/SR 25 south-southwest of Darien. However, there is no indication if these were separate segments of the highway or extensions. The segment from approximately Valona to Eulonia was under construction. A few months later, the northern terminus of the southern segment was shifted eastward to a southwest–northeast routing. Also, the western terminus of the central segment was shifted south-southwest to connect with SR 32 at US 25/US 341/SR 27 north-northwest of Brunswick. By the end of 1941, the southern segment was under construction. The central segment was indicated to be "on system–not marked or maintained". The Valona–Eulonia segment of the northern segment had completed grading, but was not surfaced. In 1943, the entire length of all three segments of SR 131 were redesignated as an extension of SR 99. SR 131 was moved to an alignment from South Newport to east-northeast of it. The entire length of this new segment had a completed hard surface. By the end of 1946, the highway was extended east-southeast to the Harris Neck National Wildlife Refuge. This extension had a completed hard surface. By the end of the decade, SR 131 was extended west-southwest to Jones. In 1953, the entire length of this extension had completed grading, but was not surfaced. About a decade later, this segment was hard surfaced. In 1977, it was decommissioned. Twelve years later, the eastern part was decommissioned, as well.

Browse numbered routes
← SR 130	GA	→ SR 132

== State Route 134 ==
State Route 134
- Location: Telfair–Wheeler counties
- Existed: 1937–1988

State Route 134 (SR 134) was a state highway that was located in Telfair and Wheeler counties. It was established in early 1937 from US 341/SR 27 southwest of Towns to SR 15 in Jordan. This segment of highway remained virtually unchanged for over a decade, when it was given a "sand clay, top soil, or stabilized earth" surface. By early 1949, SR 134 was established on a segment from SR 149 south-southeast of McRae to US 341/SR 27 northwest of Lumber City. However, there is no indication if the two segments were separate or were connected via a concurrency with US 341/SR 27 between them. By the middle of 1950, US 23 was designated on US 341/SR 27 between the two segments. In 1953, the original segment of SR 134 had completed grading, but was not surfaced. The next year, this segment was hard surfaced. Between 1957 and 1960, SR 15 at this segment's eastern end was shifted farther to the east. Its former path was redesignated as part of SR 19. Between 1960 and 1963, the newer segment of SR 134 was paved. It wasn't until 1988 that the entire length of the highway was decommissioned.

Browse numbered routes
← SR 133	GA	→ SR 135

== State Route 143 ==
State Route 143
- Location: Alabama–Tate
- Length: 61.044 mi (98.241 km)
- Existed: 1937–1977

State Route 143 (SR 143) was a state highway in the northern part of the U.S. state of Georgia. It traversed through Dade, Walker, Gordon, and Pickens counties and barely missed Whitfield County. SR 143 traversed along modern-day SR 136, SR 136 Connector (SR 136 Conn.), SR 53, Henderson Mountain Road, and SR 108. Major cities along the former route include Trenton, LaFayette, Calhoun, and Fairmount.

=== State Route 143 Connector ===
State Route 143 Connector
- Location: Northwest of Sugar Valley–Resaca
- Length: 6.982 mi (11.236 km)
- Existed: 1972–1977

State Route 143 Connector (SR 143 Conn.) was a connector route in Gordon County, Georgia, United States. It spanned from SR 143 northwest of Sugar Valley to US 41/SR 3 in Resaca. Today, it is known as SR 136.

== State Route 148 (1939–1949) ==
State Route 148
- Location: Fort Oglethorpe–Ringgold
- Existed: 1939–1949

State Route 148 (SR 148) was a state highway in the northwestern part of the state. The highway that would eventually become SR 148 was established between 1919 and the end of 1921 as an unnumbered road from SR 1 in Fort Oglethorpe to SR 3 in Ringgold. By the end of 1926, US 41 was designated on SR 3. The entire length of the highway had a "completed semi hard surface". In 1930, US 41W was designated on SR 1. By the end of 1934, US 41W was decommissioned. It was redesignated as part of US 27. By the middle of 1939, the unnumbered road was designated as SR 148. 1940 ended with the entire length of SR 148 having a "completed hard surface". By the end of 1949, SR 2 was shifted to the north, replacing the entire length of SR 148.

== State Route 148 (1955–1966) ==
State Route 148
- Location: Monroe County
- Existed: 1955–1966

State Route 148 (SR 148) was a state highway in the central part of the state. SR 148 was designated between the middle of 1954 and the middle of 1955 from SR 18 east-southeast of Forsyth to SR 87 eas of Bolingbroke. Its entire length had a "completed hard surface". Between 1957 and 1960, Interstate 75 (I-75) and SR 401 were built on a northeastern bypass of Forsyth. The southern terminus of this bypass connected with the western terminus of SR 148. Between 1960 and 1963, I-75 (and possibly SR 401) was extended southeast to just northeast of Bolingbroke, replacing SR 148 northwest of this point. Between 1963 and the end of 1966, I-75 was extended southeast through the Macon area, replacing SR 148 from northeast of Bolingbroke to east of this community (between the I-475 interchange northwest of Bolingbroke and SR 19 Spur east of the community, I-75 was under construction). The remainder of SR 148 was redesignated as part of SR 19 Spur.

Browse numbered routes
← SR 147	GA	→ SR 149

== State Route 154 (1940–1946) ==
State Route 154
- Location: Pickens–Dawson counties
- Existed: 1939–1946

State Route 154 (SR 154) was a state highway in the north-central part of the state. It was established in late 1939 from an intersection with SR 156 in Blaine to SR 5 in Talking Rock. The next year, it was under construction. Before the year ended, it was established on an eastern alignment from SR 108 northeast of Jasper to SR 183 northwest of Dawsonville. Around the middle of 1941, this new segment was under construction. In 1942, the original segment had completed grading, but was not surfaced. By the end of 1946, both segments of SR 154 were redesignated as parts of SR 136. SR 154 was reused for a former section of SR 41 that same day.

== State Route 158 (1940–1941) ==
State Route 158
- Location: Tunnel Hill–Varnell
- Existed: 1940–1941

State Route 158 (SR 158) was a state highway in the northwestern part of the state. In 1940, SR 158 was established from US 41/SR 3 in Tunnel Hill to SR 71 in Varnell. At the end of the next year, it was renumbered SR 201, because there was already another SR 158 elsewhere in the state.

== State Route 160 (1939–1995) ==
State Route 160
- Location: Clayton–DeKalb counties
- Length: 5.7 mi (9.2 km)
- Existed: 1939–1995

State Route 160 (SR 160) was a state highway in northern Clayton and southwestern DeKalb counties. SR 160 was established from SR 54 in Forest Park to SR 42 south-southeast of Constitution. By the end of 1949, it was extended south-southeast on SR 54 and then west-northwest to US 19/US 41/SR 3. In 1995, the western segment was decommissioned completely, while the eastern segment was redesignated as SR 54 Conn.

Browse numbered routes
← SR 159	GA	→ SR 161

== State Route 160 (1940–1941) ==
State Route 160
- Location: Treutlen County
- Existed: 1940–1941

State Route 160 (SR 160) was a state highway in the central part of the state. In 1940, SR 160 was established from SR 78 south of Adrian to SR 46 west of Oak Park. Later that year, SR 160's segment from south of Adrian to SR 56 northeast of Soperton had a "completed hard surface". The eastern part of the highway was under construction. By the end of 1941, all of SR 160 was renumbered SR 86, with the portion from northeast of Soperton to west of Oak Park having a completed hard surface, as there was already another SR 160 elsewhere in the state.

== State Route 161 ==
State Route 161
- Location: Cedartown–Cave Spring
- Existed: 1939–1963

State Route 161 (SR 161) was a state highway in central Polk County and southwestern Floyd counties. Its southern terminus was in Cedartown. It proceeded northwest to Cave Spring to an intersection with US 411/SR 53. It was established with a "completed hard surface" in 1939. Between 1960 and 1963, it was redesignated as part of an extended SR 100.

Browse numbered routes
← SR 161	GA	→ SR 162

== State Route 163 ==
State Route 163
- Location: South of Shiloh–Woodbury
- Existed: 1940–1952

State Route 163 (SR 163) was a state highway in the west-central part of the state. The highway that would eventually become SR 163 was established as SR 85 from south of Shiloh to SR 41 in Warm Springs. By the middle of 1933, the entire highway had a "sand clay or top soil" surface. The next year, the segment of the highway just south-southwest of Warm Springs was shifted westward to a curve into the city. At the end of 1936, two segments were under construction: around Shiloh and just west-southwest of Warm Springs. By the middle of the year, a portion from south of Shiloh to Warm Springs was under construction. Near the end of the year, the segment form south of Shiloh to Warm Springs had completed grading, but was not surfaced. 1939 ended with the segment from south of Shiloh to Warm Springs having a completed hard surface.

In 1940, SR 163 was built from Warm Springs to Woodbury. By the middle of 1941, SR 163's segment just northeast of Warm Springs was under construction. In 1942, a portion of SR 163 northeast of Warm Springs had completed grading, but was not surfaced. By the end of 1946, SR 85 was shifted eastward to a more direct path between Columbus and Manchester. Its old path between south of Shiloh and Warm Springs was redesignated as a southerly extension of SR 163.

By the middle of 1950, US 27 Alt. was designated on SR 163 from south of Shiloh to Warm Springs. By 1952, SR 163 was redesignated as SR 85W.

Browse numbered routes
← SR 162	GA	→ SR 164

== State Route 167 ==
State Route 167
- Location: Chatham, Effingham, Screven, and Jenkins counties
- Existed: 1940–1955

State Route 167 (SR 167) was a state highway that existed on a southeast-to-northwest path from the Savannah metropolitan area to Millen. In early 1940, the highway was established on a path from US 17/SR 25 southwest of Savannah and then north-northwest to US 280/SR 26 west-northwest of the city. In 1942, US 280 was truncated to the west-northwest; its path through this area was redesignated as an east-southeast extension of US 80. SR 167 was extended west-northwest on US 80/SR 26 to just west-northwest of the Chatham–Effingham county line and then on a solo path to the north-northwest to the Effingham–Screven county line. The original segment was indicated to be "on system–not marked or maintained". The entire concurrency with US 80/SR 26 and its solo trek from there to Guyton had a "completed hard surface". The next year, SR 167 was extended northwest to Millen. In 1944, a small portion of the highway north-northwest of Guyton had a completed hard surface. By the end of 1948, the original segment was indicated to have "projected mileage". A small portion between Guyton and Egypt had a "sand clay, top soil, or stabilized earth" surface. Another small portion northwest of that one had completed grading, but was not surfaced. By 1952, the segment northwest of US 80/SR 26 was redesignated as a southeast extension of SR 17, with a portion southeast of Millen having completed grading, but not being surfaced. By the middle of 1955, the original segment of SR 167 was decommissioned.

Browse numbered routes
← SR 166	GA	→ SR 168

== State Route 170 ==
State Route 170
- Location: Dade–Walker counties
- Existed: 1940–1974

State Route 170 (SR 170) was a state highway that was located in the northwestern part of the state, in Dade and Walker counties. At the end of 1940, it was established on a path from SR 157 south-southeast of Trenton east-south to a point just west of SR 193 southeast of the city. About a year later, the entire length was under construction. In 1945, the eastern terminus was shifted north-northwest to end at an intersection with SR 193 east-northeast of Trenton. By the end of 1948, the eastern terminus of the highway was truncated to end at a point east of Trenton. By the end of 1951, the eastern terminus was extended north-northeast and then northwest to end at another intersection with SR 157 west of Chattanooga Valley. This made the "eastern" terminus now the "northern" one. Most of this extension had a "sand clay, topsoil, or stabilized earth" surface. The northern part of it had completed grading, but was not surfaced. The portion east of the southern terminus was hard surfaced. In 1953, the entire extension had completed grading, but was not surfaced. By mid-1955, it had a sand clay, topsoil, or stabilized earth surface. By the middle of 1957, this extension had a "topsoil or gravel, unpaved" surface. Between 1960 and the end of 1963, the northern part of the extension was paved. At the end of the decade, the entire length of SR 170 was hard surfaced. In 1974, SR 157 was shifted eastward, replacing all of the north–south portion of SR 170, with the old alignment being redesignated as SR 189. The east–west portion of SR 170 was simply decommissioned.

Browse numbered routes
← SR 169	GA	→ SR 171

== State Route 175 ==
State Route 175
- Location: Barretts–Naylor
- Existed: 1940–1969

State Route 175 (SR 175) was a state highway that existed in the south-central part of the state, in Lowndes and Lanier counties. In 1940, it was established from SR 122 and SR 125 in Barretts to US 84/SR 38 in Naylor. By the end of 1948, a portion of the highway from east-southeast of Barretts (at the Lowndes–Lanier county line) to west-northwest of the SR 31 intersection northwest of Naylor had completed grading, but was not surfaced. From this point to the second crossing of the county line it had a "sand clay, top soil, or stabilized earth" surface. About five years later, the western terminus was truncated to a point west-northwest of the SR 31 intersection. By the middle of 1955, it was further truncated to the intersection with US 221/SR 31. By the end of 1963, the entire remaining segment of highway had a "topsoil or gravel, unpaved" surface. In 1969, SR 175 was decommissioned.

Browse numbered routes
← I-175	GA	→ SR 176

== State Route 176 ==
State Route 176
- Location: Cobb County
- Length: 15 mi (24 km)
- Existed: 1940–2010

State Route 176 (SR 176) was a state highway in the northwestern part of the state. In late 1940, it was established from SR 120 in Lost Mountain to SR 92 in New Hope. In 1942, the highway was extended south-southeast to SR 6 in Powder Springs. The extension was indicated to be "on system–not marked or maintained". The next year, the southern part of the extension had a "completed hard surface". By the end of 1948, the entire length of the extension was hard surfaced. A portion of the original segment just west of Lost Mountain had a "sand clay, top soil, or stabilized earth" surface. By the middle of 1950, this portion was hard surfaced. In 1953, a portion west of Lost Mountain had completed grading, but was not surfaced. Two years later, the New Hope–Lost Mountain segment had a sand clay, topsoil, or stabilized earth surface. By the middle of 1957, this segment was indicated to have a "topsoil or gravel, unpaved" surface. Before the decade ended, the New Hope–Lost Mountain segment was paved. Also, an unnumbered road was built from Lost Mountain to US 41/SR 3 in Acworth. In 1969, the New Hope-to-Lost Mountain segment was shifted to the northeast onto this unnumbered road. Its former alignment was redesignated as SR 92 Conn. In 2010, SR 176 was decommissioned.

Major intersections

This table shows the last alignment of the highway. The entire route was in Cobb County.

Location	mi	km	Destinations	Notes
Powder Springs			US 278 / SR 6 – Hiram, Lithia Springs	Southern terminus
Macland			SR 360 – Dallas, Marietta	
Lost Mountain			SR 120 – Dallas, Marietta	
Acworth			US 41 / SR 3 – Cartersville, Kennesaw	Northern terminus
1.000 mi = 1.609 km; 1.000 km = 0.621 mi

Browse numbered routes
← SR 175	GA	→ SR 177

== State Route 179 ==
State Route 179
- Location: Grady County
- Length: 27.9 mi (44.9 km)
- Existed: 1940–1987

State Route 179 (SR 179) was a state highway that existed in the southwestern part of the state. It traversed Grady County. SR 179 existed as a state highway from 1940 to 1987. Today it is known as County Route 179, or simply "Old 179". At the end of 1940, SR 179 was established from SR 111 in Calvary to US 84/SR 38 in Whigham. In 1942, it was extended north-northwest to just north of the Grady–Mitchell county line, and then west to SR 97 in Vada. The entire highway was indicated as being "on system–not marked or maintained". By the end of 1949, SR 262 was established on the Grady–Mitchell county line, replacing the east–west part of SR 179. By the middle of 1950, a portion north-northwest of Whigham was hard surfaced. Two small portions between Whigham and the Grady–Mitchell county line had a "sand clay, top soil, or stabilized earth" surface. By the end of 1951, the southern two thirds of this segment was hard surfaced. A portion south-southeast of Whigham had completed grading, but was not surfaced. The next year, this portion near Whigham was hard surfaced. By the middle of 1954, the entire Calvary–Whigham segment was hard surfaced. A portion south of the SR 262 intersection was shifted eastward and had a sand clay, topsoil, or stabilized earth surface. About a year later, this portion was hard surfaced. In 1987, SR 179 was decommissioned.

=== State Route 179 Connector ===
State Route 179 Connector
- Location: Near Amsterdam–Calvary
- Existed: 1969–1987

State Route 179 Connector (SR 179 Conn.) was a connector route of SR 179 that existed in the southwestern part of the state. In 1969, it was established between US 27/SR 1 east-southeast of Amsterdam to SR 111 and SR 179 in Calvary. In 1987, SR 179 Conn. was decommissioned.

== State Route 181 (1940–1941) ==
State Route 181
- Location: Social Circle
- Existed: 1940–1941

State Route 181 (SR 181) was a short-lived state highway that existed entirely in Walton County. The roadway that would eventually become SR 181 was built between 1921 and the end of 1926 as an unnumbered road from SR 11 in Social Circle to SR 12 southeast of the city. The entire length of this road had a "sand clay or top soil" surface. In 1930, this road was designated as the entire length of SR 60. At the end of 1940, it was redesignated as SR 181. At the end of 1941, it was redesignated as SR 213. SR 181 was reused for a former portion of SR 8 on that same day.

== See also ==
- List of state routes in Georgia
