= Georgia State Route 382 =

State highway in Georgia, United States

State Route 382
- SR 382 highlighted in red

Route information
- Maintained by GDOT
- Length: 11.6 mi (18.7 km)
- Existed: 1981–present

Major junctions
- West end: SR 136 south of Carters Lake
- East end: SR 5 / SR 515 south-southwest of Ellijay

Location
- Country: United States
- State: Georgia
- Counties: Gilmer

Highway system
- Georgia State Highway System; Interstate; US; State; Special
| ← SR 381 | → SR 383 |

State Route 382 (SR 382) is an 11.6-mile-long (18.7 km) state highway that travels west-to-east in a squiggly-curved C-shape entirely within Gilmer County in the north-central part of the U.S. state of Georgia. It serves as a connecting route from SR 136 south of Carters Lake to Georgia State Route 5/SR 515 south-southwest of Ellijay. The route can be used to access the southern shores of Carters Lake.

== Route description ==
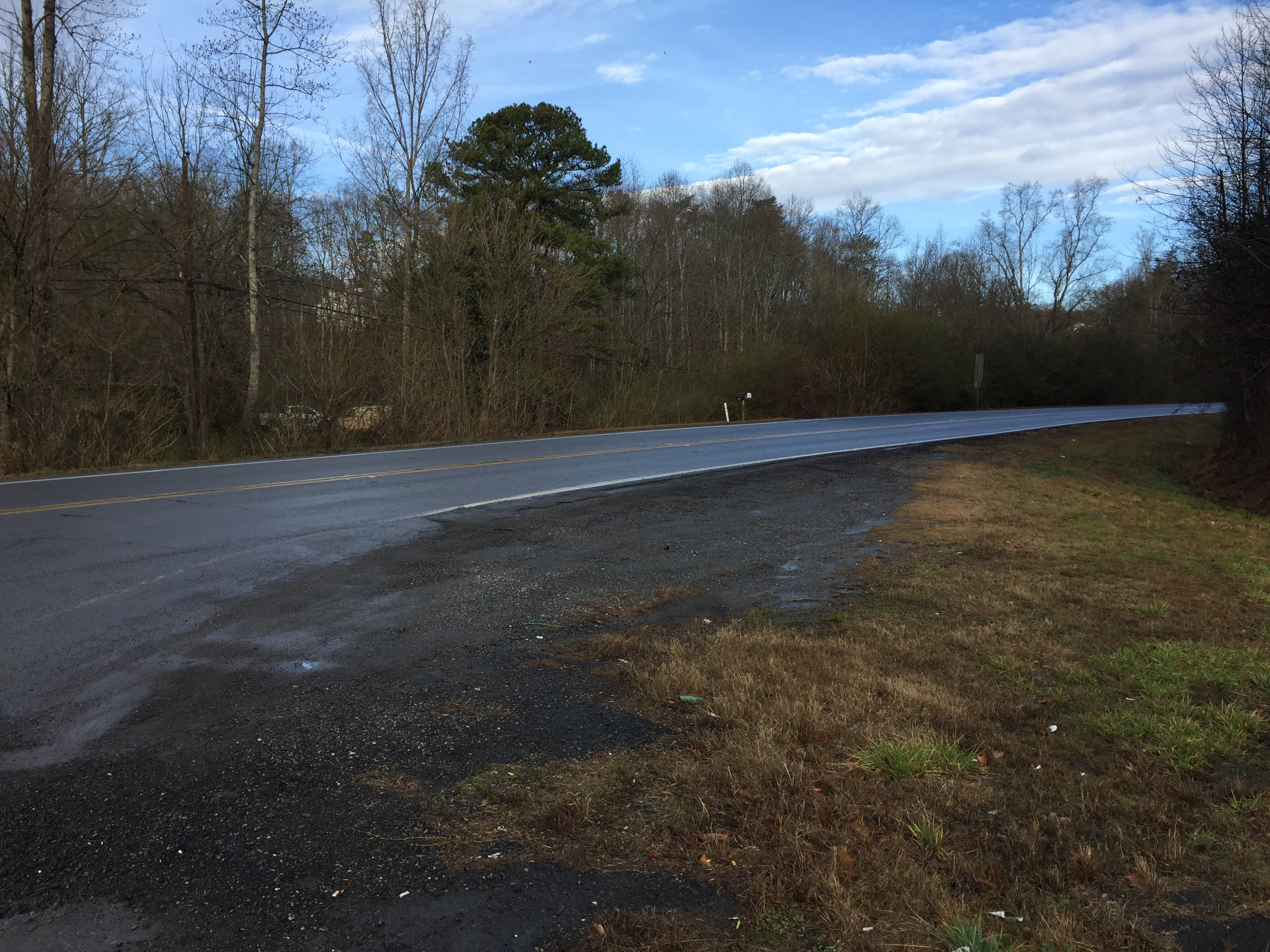
State Route 382 in Gilmer County, January 2017

SR 382 begins at an intersection with SR 136 southeast of Carters Lake. It travels in a northeasterly direction and curves to the east. It passes north and east of Gilmer County Airport. A short distance later, it meets its eastern terminus, an intersection with SR 5/SR 515.

SR 382 is not part of the National Highway System, a system of roadways important to the nation's economy, defense, and mobility.

== History ==
The road that would eventually become SR 382 was established between January 1979 and March 1980. However, the route's eastern terminus was farther to the north-northeast than it is now. At this time, its eastern terminus intersected only SR 5, since SR 515 had not been routed along SR 5. By January 1982, that entire route was designated SR 382. In 1983, SR 5 was moved to a new alignment farther to the east, and the old route became SR 5 Alternate. As such, SR 382 was routed on a concurrency with SR 5 Alt. to its current eastern terminus, the intersection with SR 5. By January 1986, SR 5 Alternate had been decommissioned.

== Major intersections ==
The entire route is in Gilmer County.

| Location | mi | km | Destinations | Notes |
|---|---|---|---|---|
| | 0.0 | 0.0 | SR 136 – Carters, Blaine | Western terminus |
| | 11.6 | 18.7 | SR 5 / SR 515 | Eastern terminus |
1.000 mi = 1.609 km; 1.000 km = 0.621 mi

== See also ==
- List of highways numbered 382
