= Georgia State Route 20 (disambiguation) =

Georgia State Route 20 is a state highway from the Alabama state line west of Coosa to Lower Woolsey Road southwest of Hampton.

Georgia State Route 20 could also refer to:

- Georgia State Route 20 (1919–1921): a former state highway that existed from Gray to Sparta
- Georgia State Route 20 (1921–1929): a former state highway that existed from Louisville to Waynesboro

== See also ==
- Interstate 20 in Georgia
