= Georgia State Route 156 =

State highway in Georgia, United States

State Route 156
- SR 156 highlighted in red

Route information
- Maintained by GDOT
- Length: 34.3 mi (55.2 km)

Major junctions
- West end: US 27 / SR 1 near Armuchee
- SR 136 Conn. in Calhoun US 41 / SR 3 in Calhoun I-75 in Calhoun
- East end: US 411 / SR 61 north of Ranger

Location
- Country: United States
- State: Georgia
- Counties: Floyd, Gordon

Highway system
- Georgia State Highway System; Interstate; US; State; Special
← SR 155	→ SR 157

State Route 156 (SR 156) is a 34.3-mile-long (55.2 km) state highway that runs west-to-east through portions of Floyd and Gordon counties in the northwestern part of the U.S. state of Georgia.

== Route description ==
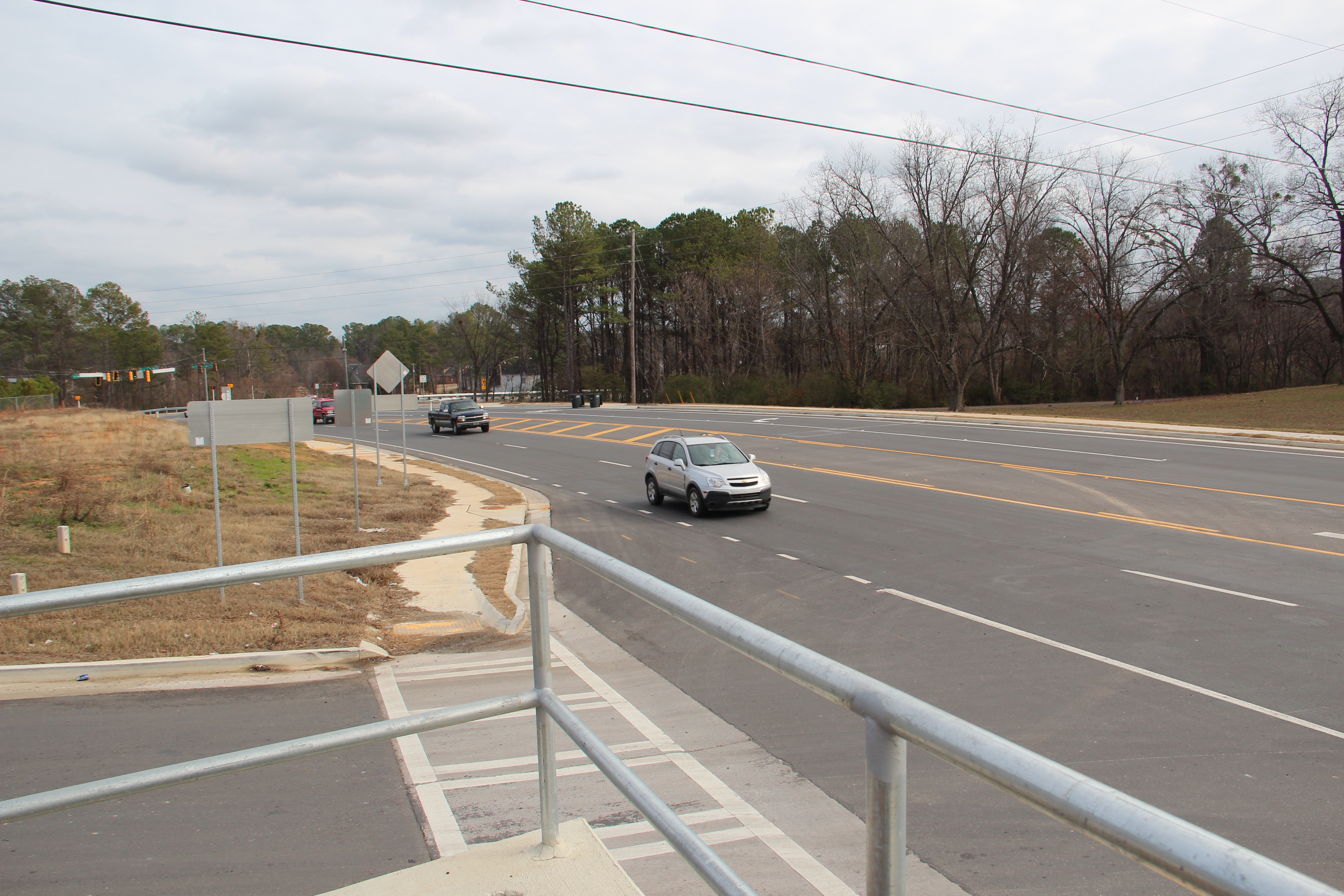
State Route 156 in Gordon County

SR 156 begins at an intersection with U.S. Route 27 (US 27)/SR 1 north of Armuchee in Floyd County. It heads northeast through rural areas until it enters Gordon County. The highway continues to the northeast and curves to the east to Calhoun. The first intersection in Calhoun is SR 136 Connector (River Street). The two highways head concurrent to the north-northwest for about 700 feet (210 m). They split, with SR 156 heading to the northeast, and then to the southeast, over a CSX Transportation railroad, to an intersection with US 41/SR 3 (North Wall Street). SR 156 continues to the southeast and heads east to an interchange with Interstate 75 (I-75). The highway heads northeast and east to meet its eastern terminus, an intersection with US 411/SR 61 north of Ranger.

SR 156 is not part of the National Highway System.

== Major intersections ==
County	Location	mi	km	Destinations	Notes
Floyd		0.0	0.0	US 27 / SR 1 – Rome, Summerville	Western terminus
Gordon	Calhoun	17.4	28.0	SR 136 Conn. south (South River Street)	Western end of SR 136 Conn. concurrency
Gordon	Calhoun	17.6	28.3	SR 136 Conn. north (North River Street) – Villanow	Eastern end of SR 136 Conn. concurrency
Gordon	Calhoun	18.5	29.8	US 41 / SR 3 (North Wall Street)	
Gordon	Calhoun	20.1	32.3	I-75 (Larry McDonald Memorial Highway / SR 401) – Atlanta, Chattanooga	I-75 exit 315
Gordon		34.3	55.2	US 411 / SR 61	Eastern terminus
1.000 mi = 1.609 km; 1.000 km = 0.621 mi: Concurrency terminus
