= Juno, Georgia =

- Unincorporated community
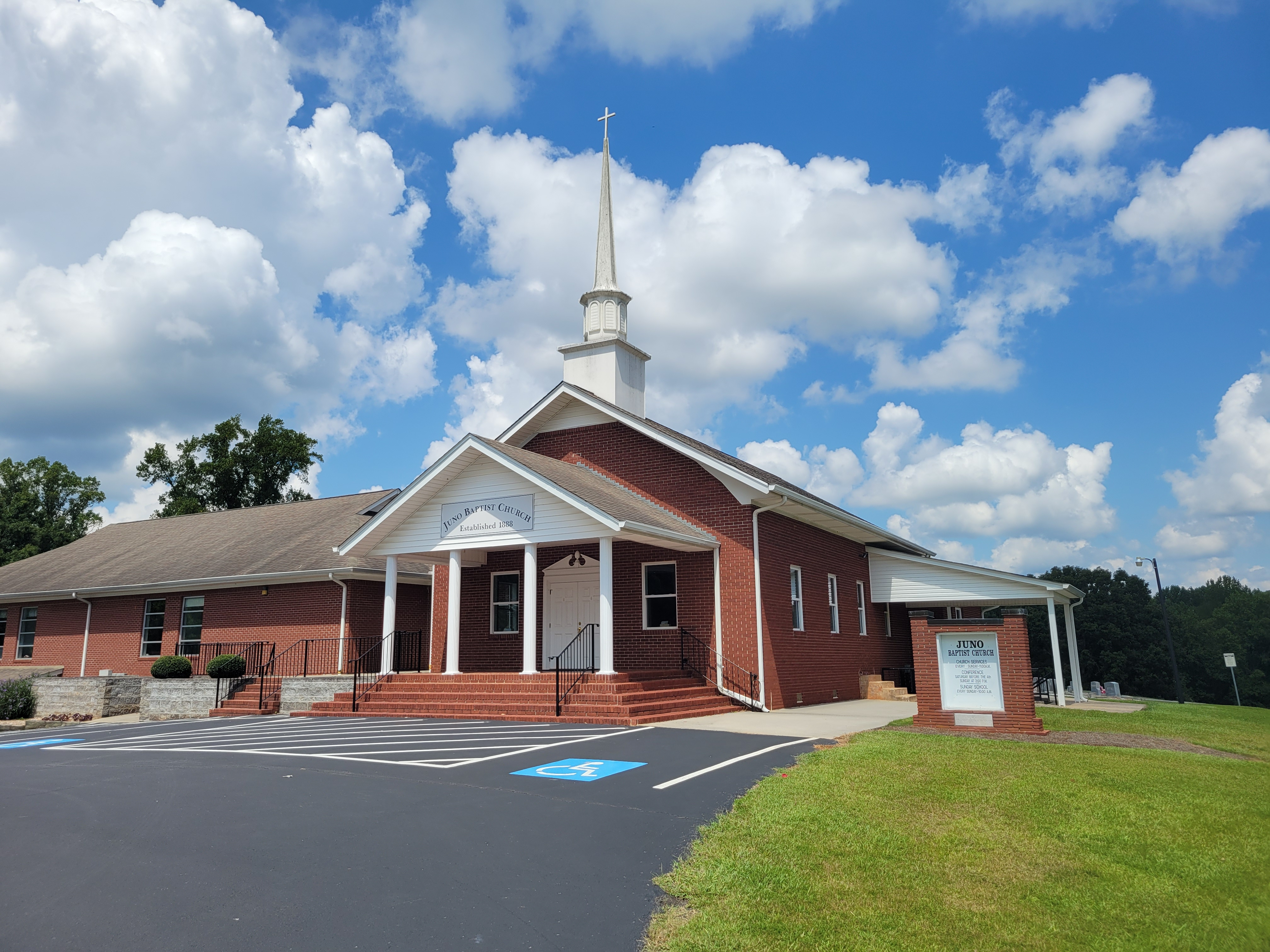
- Juno Baptist Church

- Location within the state of Georgia Juno (the United States)
- Coordinates: 34°28′33″N 84°11′39″W
- Country: United States
- State: Georgia
- County: Dawson
- Elevation: 1,493 ft (455 m)
- Time zone: UTC-5 (Eastern (EST))
  - Summer (DST): UTC-4 (EDT)
- GNIS feature ID: 332127

Juno is an unincorporated community in Dawson County, Georgia, United States. It lies along State Route 183 to the northwest of the city of Dawsonville, the county seat of Dawson County. Its elevation is 1,493 feet (455 m).

== History ==
A post office called Juno was established in 1850 and remained in operation until 1980. The community was named after Juno, the Roman goddess of marriage and queen of the gods.
