= Georgia State Route 183 =

Highway in Georgia

State Route 183
- Elliott Family Parkway
- SR 183 highlighted in red

Route information
- Maintained by GDOT
- Length: 10.405 mi (16.745 km)

Major junctions
- South end: SR 53 west of Dawsonville
- North end: SR 52 northwest of Dawsonville

Location
- Country: United States
- State: Georgia
- Counties: Dawson

Highway system
- Georgia State Highway System; Interstate; US; State; Special
← SR 182	→ SR 184

State Route 183 (SR 183) is a 10.405-mile-long (16.745 km) state highway that travels south-to-north through portions of Dawson County in the north-central part of the U.S. state of Georgia. The highway extends from its southern terminus at SR 53 west of Dawsonville to its northern terminus at SR 52 south of Amicalola Falls State Park. SR 183, together with SR 136, is the primary feeder route from the south to Amicalola Falls and Amicalola Falls State Park. It is known as Elliott Family Parkway for its entire length, in honor of Dawsonville native racecar drivers Bill Elliott and his son Chase Elliott.

== Route description ==
SR 183 starts at its intersection with SR 53, just west of Dawsonville, and just east of Atlanta Motorsports Park, designed by Hermann Tilke. The route, which is known as Elliott Family Parkway for its entirety, initially runs north, then curves northwest where it intersects Keith Evans Road, which continues straight north, and which used to be signed as SR 342, before this state route designation was decommissioned.

SR 183 runs through the community of Juno and intersects SR 136 soon thereafter, and is co-signed with it for a short run, before SR 136 splits off and heads straight west, while SR 183 continues northwest. The route reaches its northern terminus as it meets SR 52, where that route dips south and then north again, and forms the southern border of Amicalola Falls State Park. SR 183 provides the primary access from the south to Amicalola Falls, with SR 52 providing access from the west and east. This state park also forms the southernmost section of the Blue Ridge Wildlife Management Area, a southern province of the Appalachian Mountains range.

The Georgia Department of Transportation average annual daily traffic (AADT) numbers for the year 2011 show an average daily traffic load of just over 1,900 vehicles between the route's southern terminus and Keith Evans Road, decreasing to just over 1,200 vehicles as the route approaches it intersection with SR 136. Once these two routes become concurrent, traffic averages increase to just over 2,500 vehicles per day, and then slightly taper off to around 2,200 vehicles as the route run to its northern terminus at SR 52.

== History ==
The first portion of the roadway that is signed as SR 183 today makes its appearance on Georgia state road maps in 1937, when SR 136 was first graded and ran from northeast of Dawsonville to intersect SR 52; it was therefore the section of today's state route from the start of its concurrency with SR 136 to its northern terminus at SR 52 (signed as SR 43 at the time) that were first extant. By early in 1941, the 7.8 miles (12.6 km) stretch from SR 53 to SR 136 had been graded, but neither this new stretch of roadway, nor the portion of SR 136 in the area, had been improved as far as surface conditions were concerned. At the same time, the portion of SR 136 that extends west from SR 183 had been graded, and was signed as SR 154. Just 3 months later, the entire stretch of SR 183 had been improved to feature hard surface, and the full length of the route had been re-signed as SR 183, meaning that at the time SR 136 terminated at the intersection of the two routes.

It was early in 1942 when the route's northern terminus, which had been signed as SR 43, was designated as SR 52. By late in 1946, the routing of SR 154 west of SR 183 had been re-signed as SR 136, extending that route to west of Talking Rock. The final change made to roadways related to SR 183 was the appearance in 1963 of SR 342, which ran from SR 183 straight north to SR 52. This route, which was decommissioned by 1983, is found on Georgia maps today as Keith Evans Road south of SR 183, and as Bailey Waters Road north of SR 183 to SR 52.

== Major intersections ==
The entire route is in Dawson County.

Location	mi	km	Destinations	Notes
	0.000	0.000	SR 53	Southern terminus of SR 183
	7.530	12.118	SR 136 east	Southern terminus of concurrency with SR 136
	9.199	14.804	SR 136 west	Northern terminus of concurrency with SR 136
	10.405	16.745	SR 52	Northern terminus of SR 183
1.000 mi = 1.609 km; 1.000 km = 0.621 mi: Concurrency terminus
