= Sugar Valley, Georgia =

- Unincorporated community
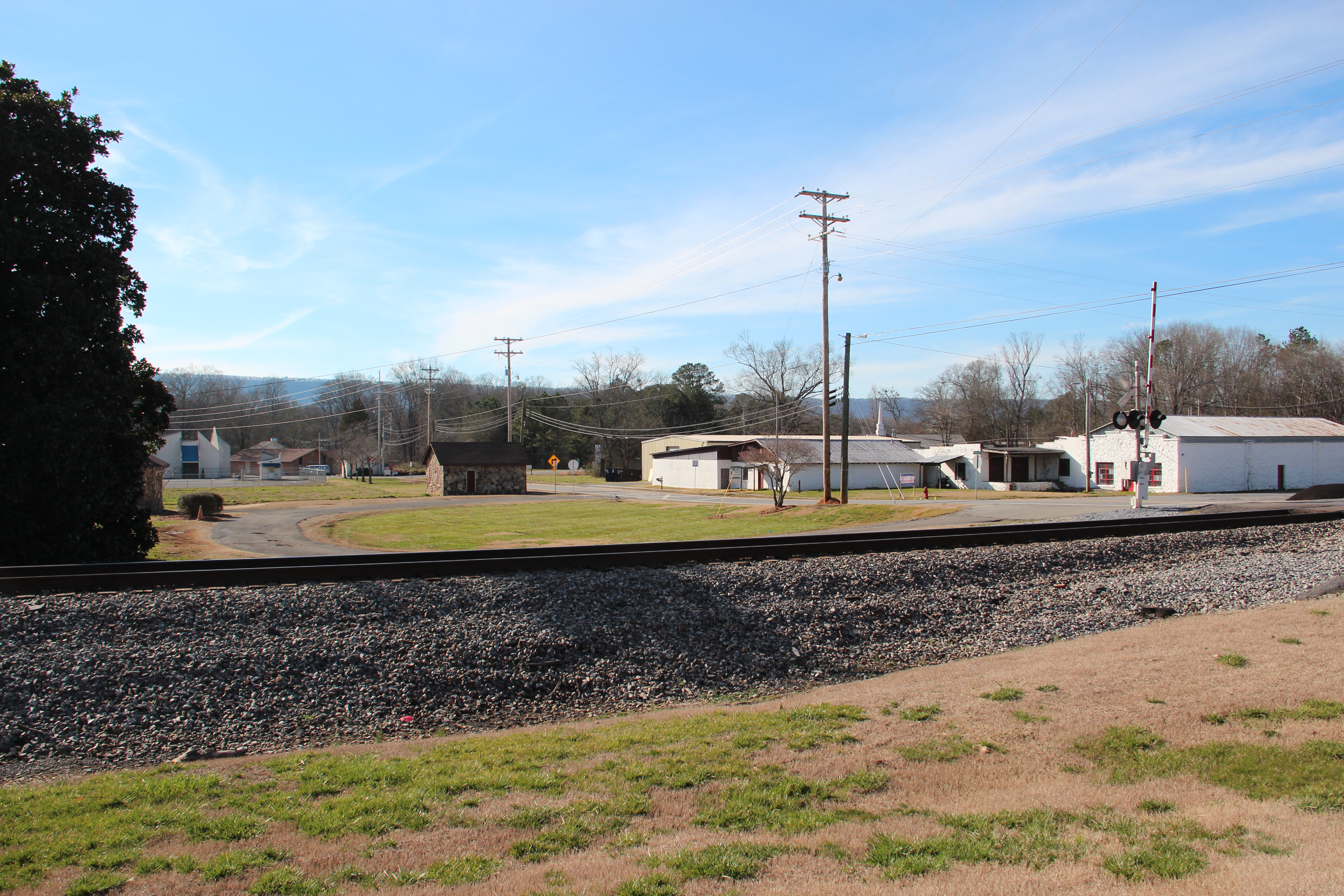
- View of the community

- Location within Georgia Location within the United States
- Coordinates: 34°33′29″N 85°0′43″W
- Country: United States
- State: Georgia
- County: Gordon
- Time zone: UTC-5 (Eastern (EST))
  - Summer (DST): UTC-4 (EDT)
- ZIP code: 30746
- Area codes: 706/762

Sugar Valley is an unincorporated community in Gordon County, Georgia, United States, northwest of Calhoun and east of Horn Mountain Ridge. SR 136 runs through the center of the town.

== History ==
A post office called Sugar Valley has been in operation since 1844. The community may have been named after a grove of sugar maple trees near the original town site.

The Georgia General Assembly incorporated Sugar Valley as a town in 1887. The town's municipal charter was repealed in 1995.

== Geography ==
Sugar Valley is located near the northwest corner of Gordon County. Nearby is the Oostanaula River. Three miles to the west of Sugar Valley at the extreme edge of Gordon County is the Ridge and Valley region, where Horn Mountain separates Gordon and Floyd County. The mountain reaches over 1,800 feet in elevation compared to 600 feet in Sugar Valley.

== Notable people ==
- Paul Gillespie, Major League Baseball Chicago Cubs catcher; born here
- Gertrude McCoy, silent film star; born here.
