= Amsterdam, Georgia =

- Unincorporated community
- Location within Georgia
- Coordinates: 30°43′39″N 84°26′09″W
- Country: United States
- State: Georgia
- County: Decatur
- Time zone: UTC-5 (Eastern (EST))
  - Summer (DST): UTC-4 (EDT)
- ZIP code: 39852
- Area code: 229
- GNIS feature ID: 331039

Amsterdam is an unincorporated community in Decatur County, in the U.S. state of Georgia.

== History ==
Amsterdam had its start when the railroad was extended to that point. The community was named after Amsterdam, the capital of the Netherlands. A post office called Amsterdam was established in 1903, and remained in operation until 1959.
