= Villanow, Georgia =

Unincorporated community in Georgia, U.S.

Coordinates: 34°40′25″N 85°06′53″W

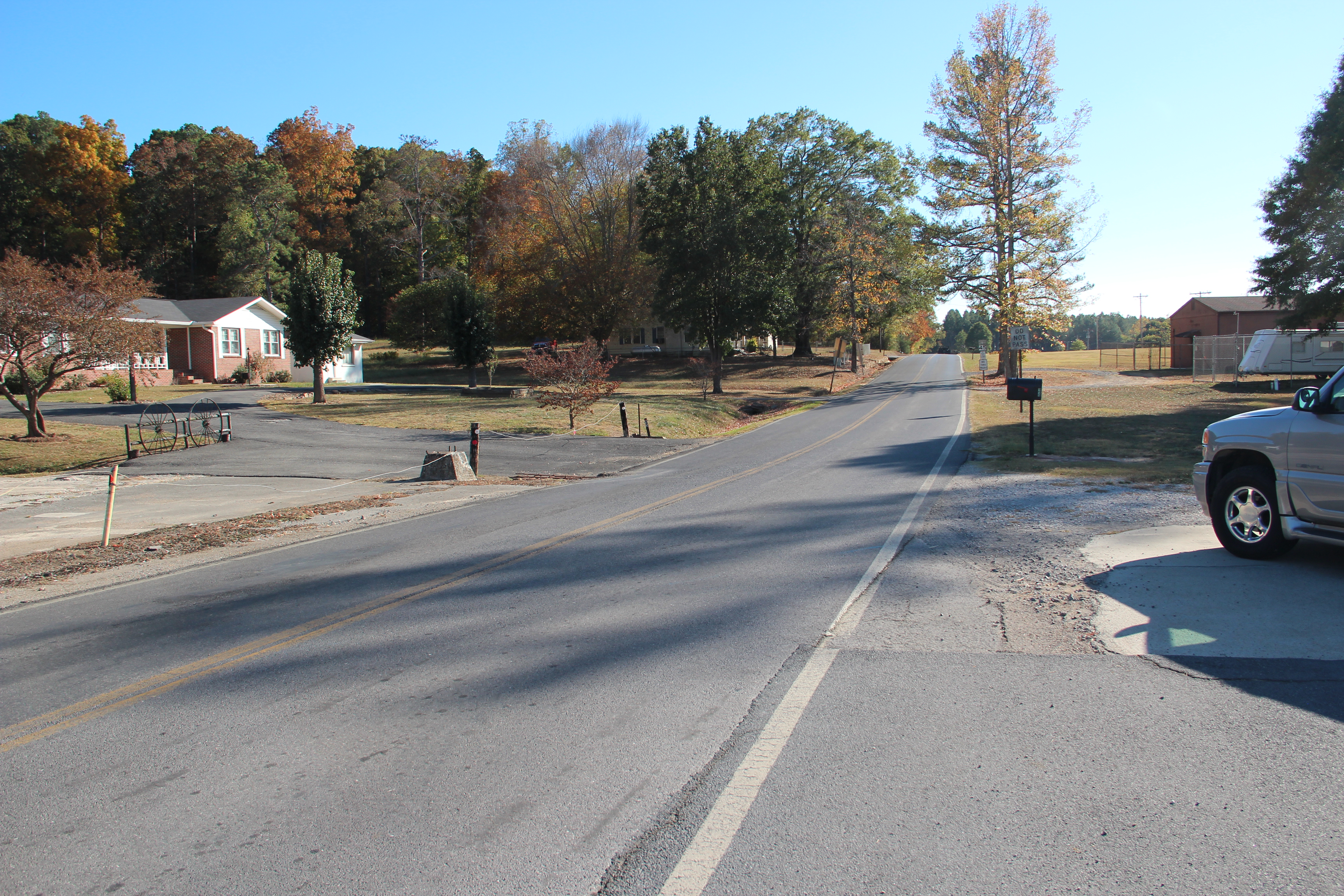
Villanow in October

Villanow is an unincorporated community in Walker County, Georgia, United States, which lies between Dalton and LaFayette. Armuchee Valley Elementary School was closed in 1992, following a fire that destroyed the classrooms and offices. In 1993, a separate fire destroyed what remained of the school, to include the cafeteria. In September 2010, the Armuchee Valley Community Center opened. The community center houses Walker County's No. 14 fire station, in addition to a sheriff's office, and voting precinct.

== History ==
A post office called Villanow was established in 1844, and remained in operation until it was discontinued in 1934. According to tradition, the community was named when it grew large enough for someone to say "It is no longer a hamlet, but is now a village".

== Villanow Country Store ==
The Villanow Country Store is on the National List of Historic Places under the name of Cavender's Country Store. According to the documentation of the National List of Historic Places it was built around the year of 1840 and was probably built by Joseph Warren Cavender, who of all of it owners over the years, owned it longest. It holds the record in the State of Georgia as the longest operating stand alone country store in the entire state. There is a controversy over the actual date of the store's beginning. A current resident of Villanow states that Joseph Warren Cavender was not even born yet in 1840, but is generally believed to be the builder/owner. That means the date is more than likely incorrect. Joseph Warren Cavender was a soldier for the Confederacy and after the war he became employed by his wartime enemy—the United States Government. He was hired to help in the cleanup and restoration of the area of the battlefield around Chickamauga and Chattanooga and in the installment of many of the monuments of Chickamauga Park. After about 4 years of this effort, it is reported by Villanow citizens that Cavender used his savings to obtain as much available land in the Villanow area at as little as twenty-five cents an acre, including the land upon which the historic Cavender Country Store was built. The Cavender Store supplied almost any needs of the Villanow community from buggies to caskets. In addition to the Country Store, Cavender also had a buggy and wagon shop, as well as a blacksmith shop and cotton mill on the same property. It was also the center of activity of that mountain community and the couple of benches out front of the store served as a vital meeting place. On clear days, there was even official business transacted in the front of the store outside. The store itself is now closed after being sold to Marty and Sharon Vess from Rodney and Ebeth Edwards in 1999, who own the sod farm down the road from the store

The store is located between Ringgold and Resaca, Georgia, on the highway which runs in front of the store. Joseph Warren Cavender married the only daughter of Villanow and Walker County's first physician Adam G. Clements, MD—Martha "Mattie" Clements. All seven brothers of "Mattie" Clements served along with Joseph Warren Cavender in the Confederate Armed Forces. Three of them attained the position of Asst. Surgeon. All eight of those sons of Villanow, Georgia, returned home to lead peaceful lives with their families and townsfolk. The store is now a Chiropractic Office and a private residence.
