= Carters Lake (Blue Ridge Mountains) =

Man-made lake in Georgia, United States

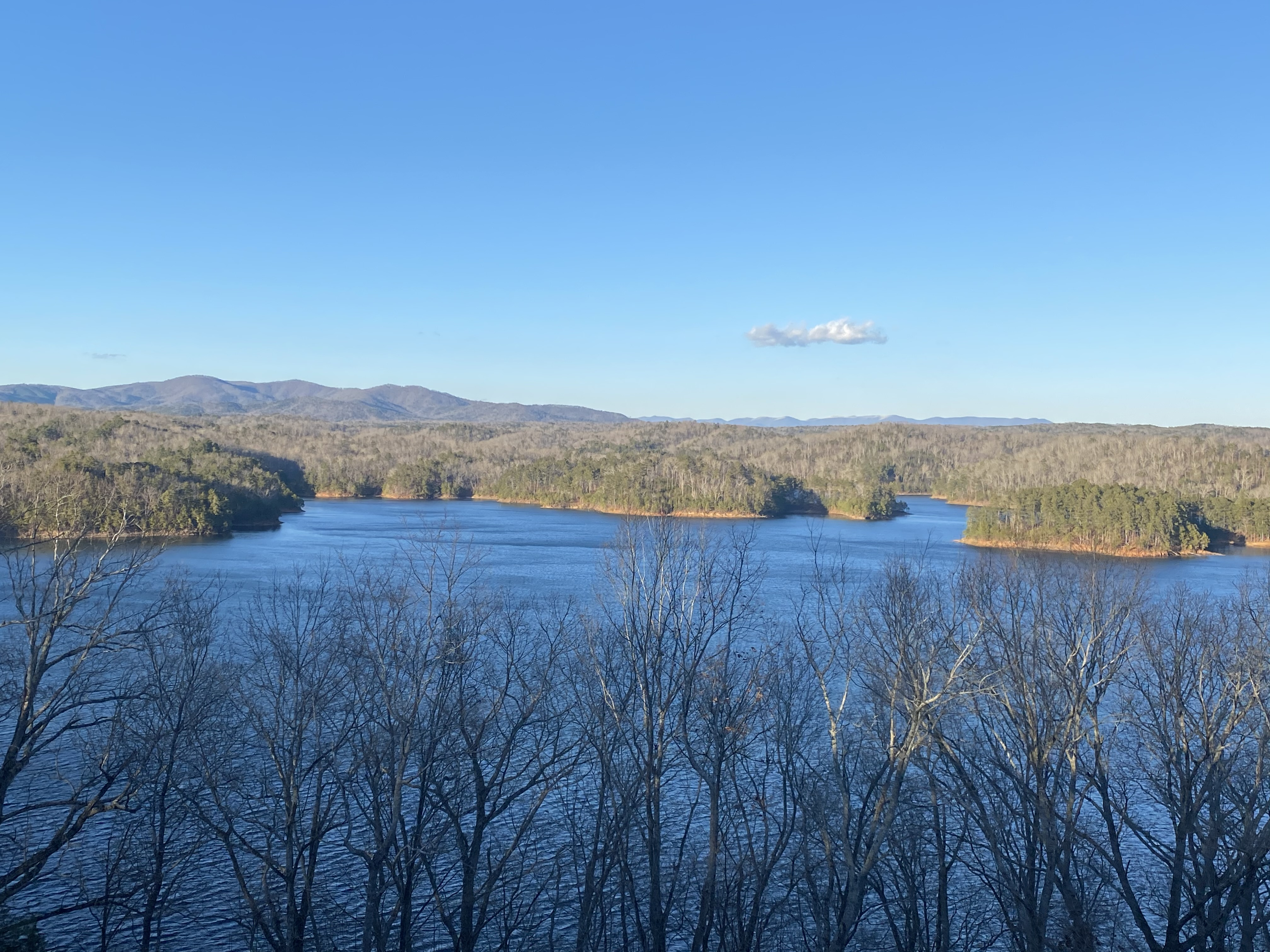

- Location within Georgia Location within the United States
- Location: Blue Ridge Mountains; Gilmer & Murray counties, Georgia; United States
- Coordinates: 34.6072°N 84.6332°W
- Type: natural lake, reservoir
- Primary inflows: Coosawattee River
- Basin countries: United States
- Surface area: 3,200 acres (13 km^{2})
- Average depth: 200 ft (61 m)
- Max. depth: 450 ft (140 m)
- Water volume: 383,600 acre⋅ft (0.4732 km^{3})
- Shore length^{1}: 62 mi (100 km)
- Surface elevation: 1,074 ft (327 m)
- ^{1} Shore length is not a well-defined measure.

Carters Lake is a man-made reservoir located on the Coosawattee River in the Blue Ridge Mountains in Gilmer and Murray counties in the U.S. state of Georgia. It is the state's deepest lake.

== Description ==
While the reservoir is on the Coosawattee River, it empties directly into the Regulation Reservoir (another reservoir on the river). The reservoir was named after Farrish Carter who lived in the 19th century. It has a surface area of 3,200 acres (13 km^{2}) and has 62 miles (100 km) of shoreline. Carters Lake has an average depth of 200 feet (61 m) and a maximum depth of 450 feet (140 m).

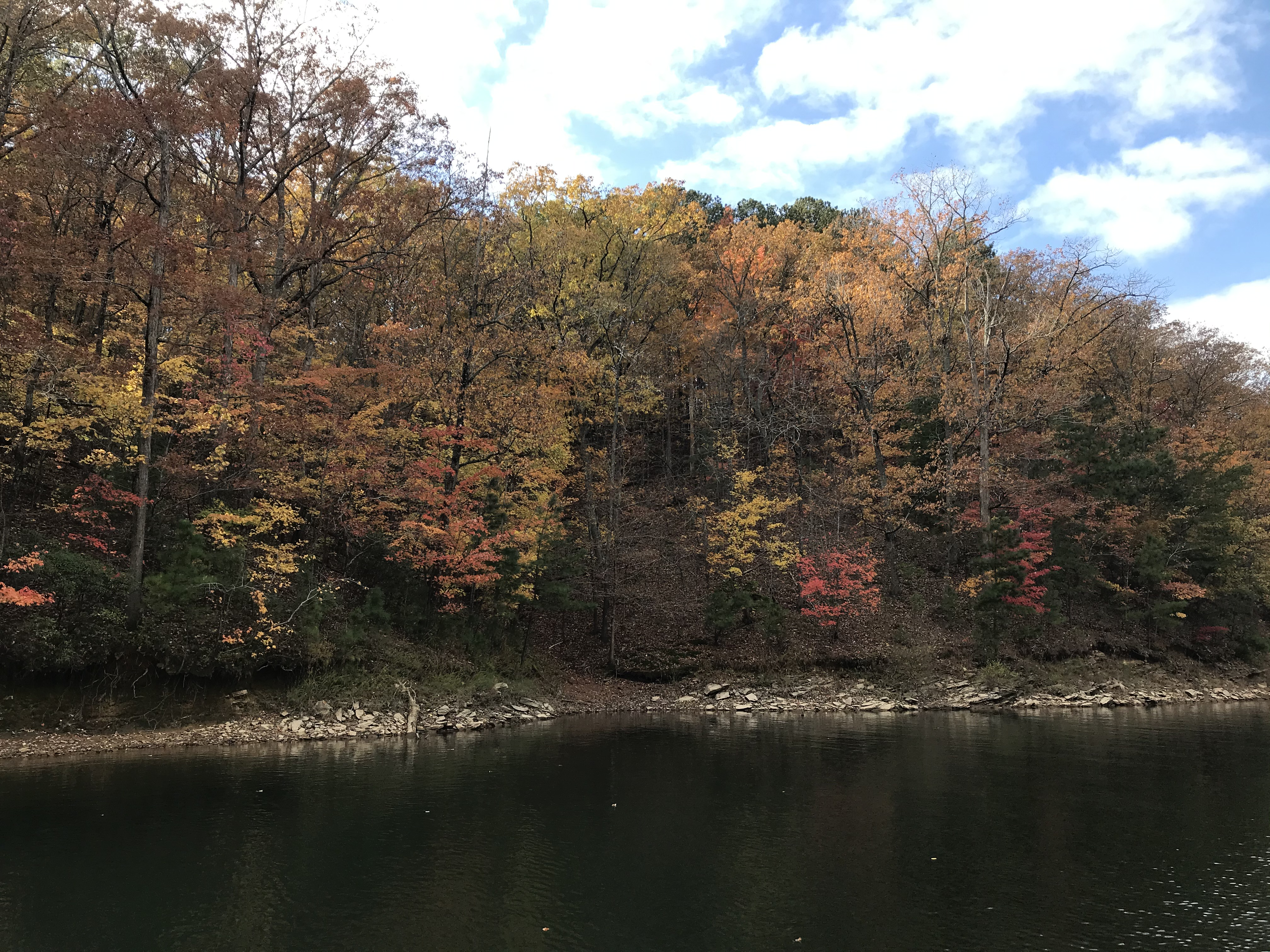
Fall Colors at Carters Lake

Carters Lake, owned by the US Army Corps of Engineers, is a man-made lake without private docks or houses along its shore. This lake is fed by the Coosawattee River that runs between Ellijay and Chatsworth, and was formed by Carters Dam, the tallest earthen dam east of the Mississippi, which was completed in 1977. Since then, it has been used to act as a watershed to control annual flooding and generate power. Carters Lake is also used for various forms of outdoor recreation such as fishing, water skiing, hiking, camping, and mountain biking.

Construction of the dam, and the filling in of the lake, destroyed the Mississippian site of Coosa. Coosa used to be the capital of a large country in 1540 when Hernando De Soto and his men entered the town on their military expedition.

The lake served as inspiration for the wild river that was tamed by a dam in the novel and film Deliverance by James Dickey.

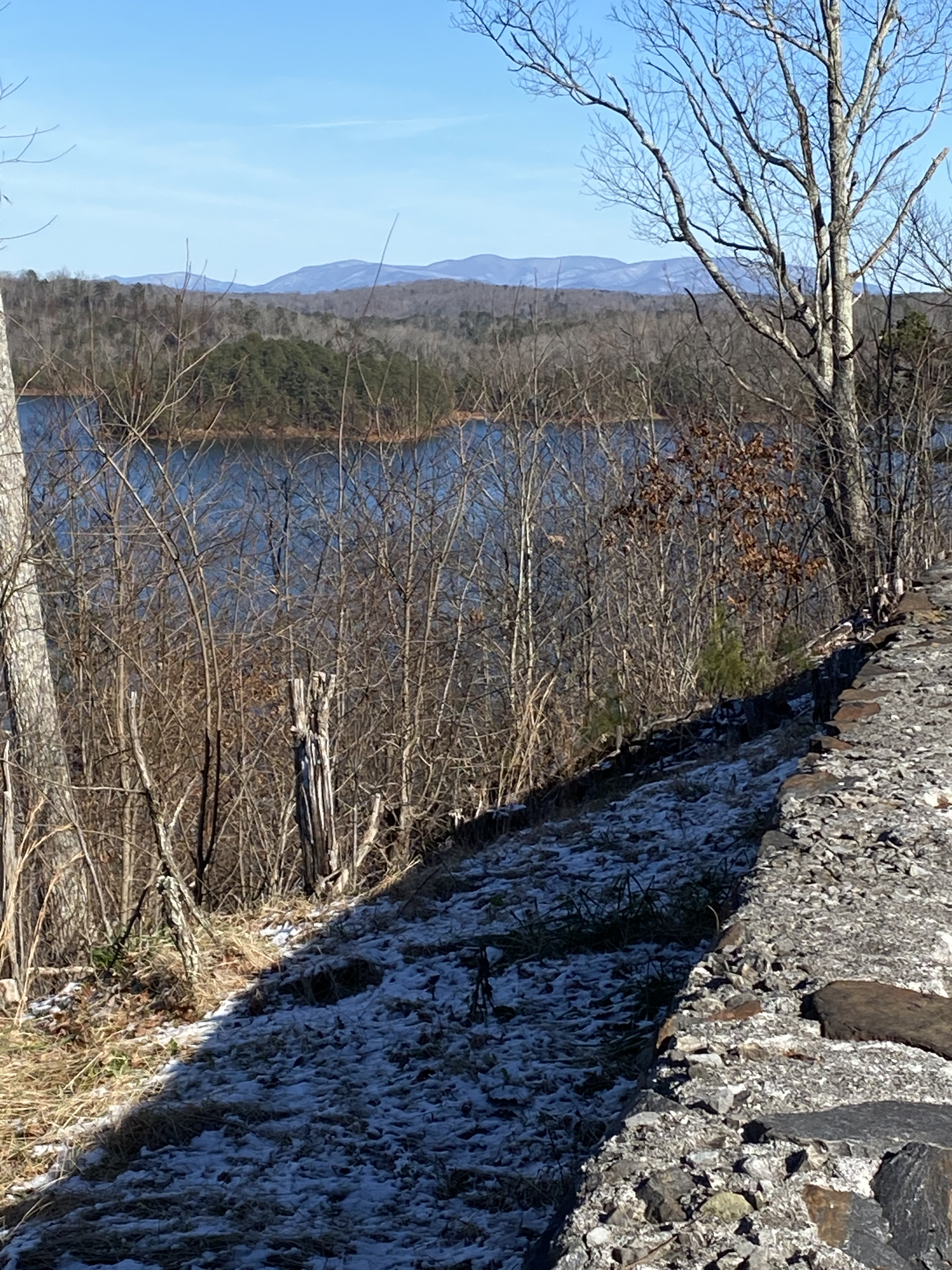
Snow-capped Stover Mountain view from Carters

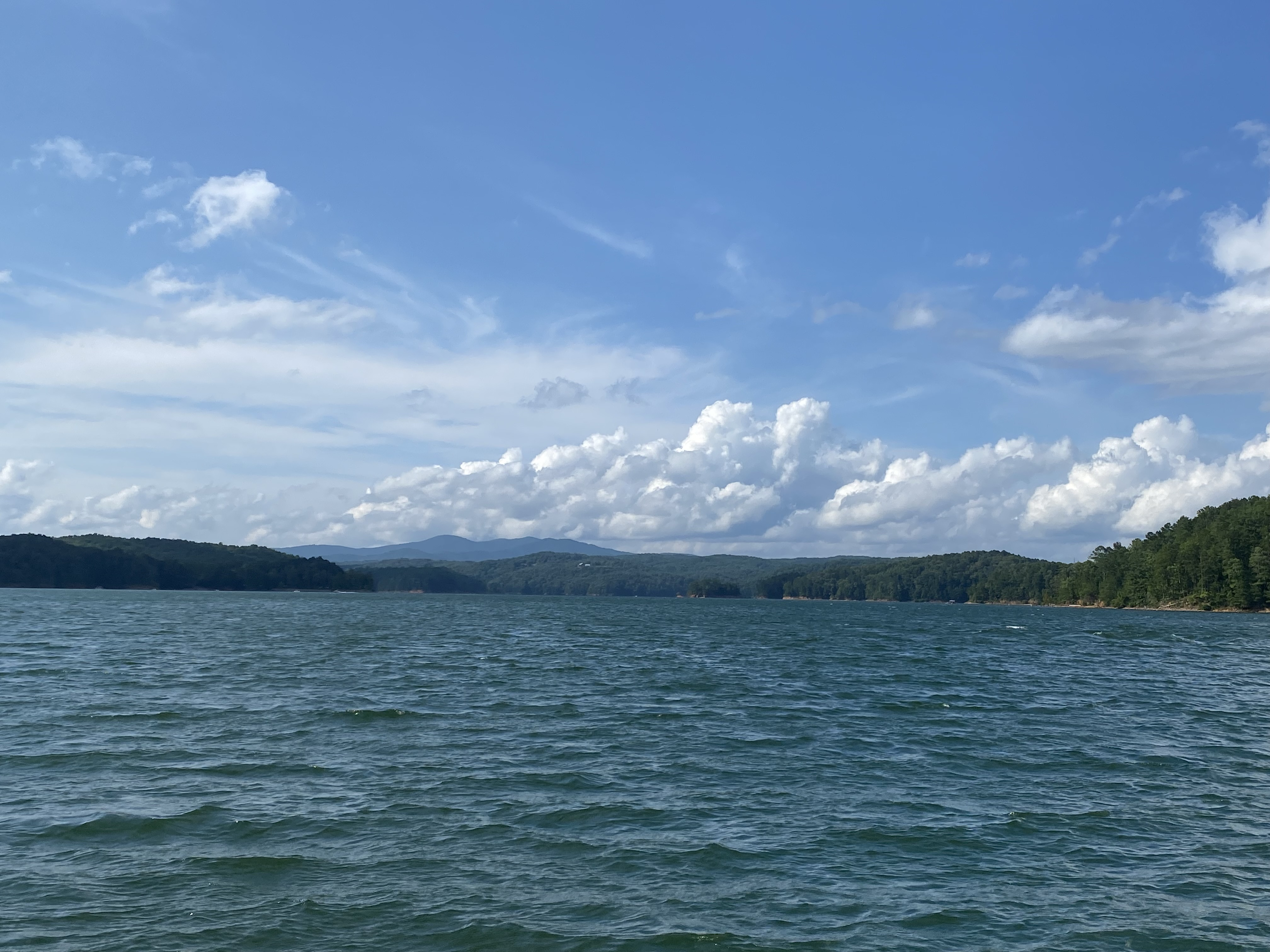
Summer at Carters Lake

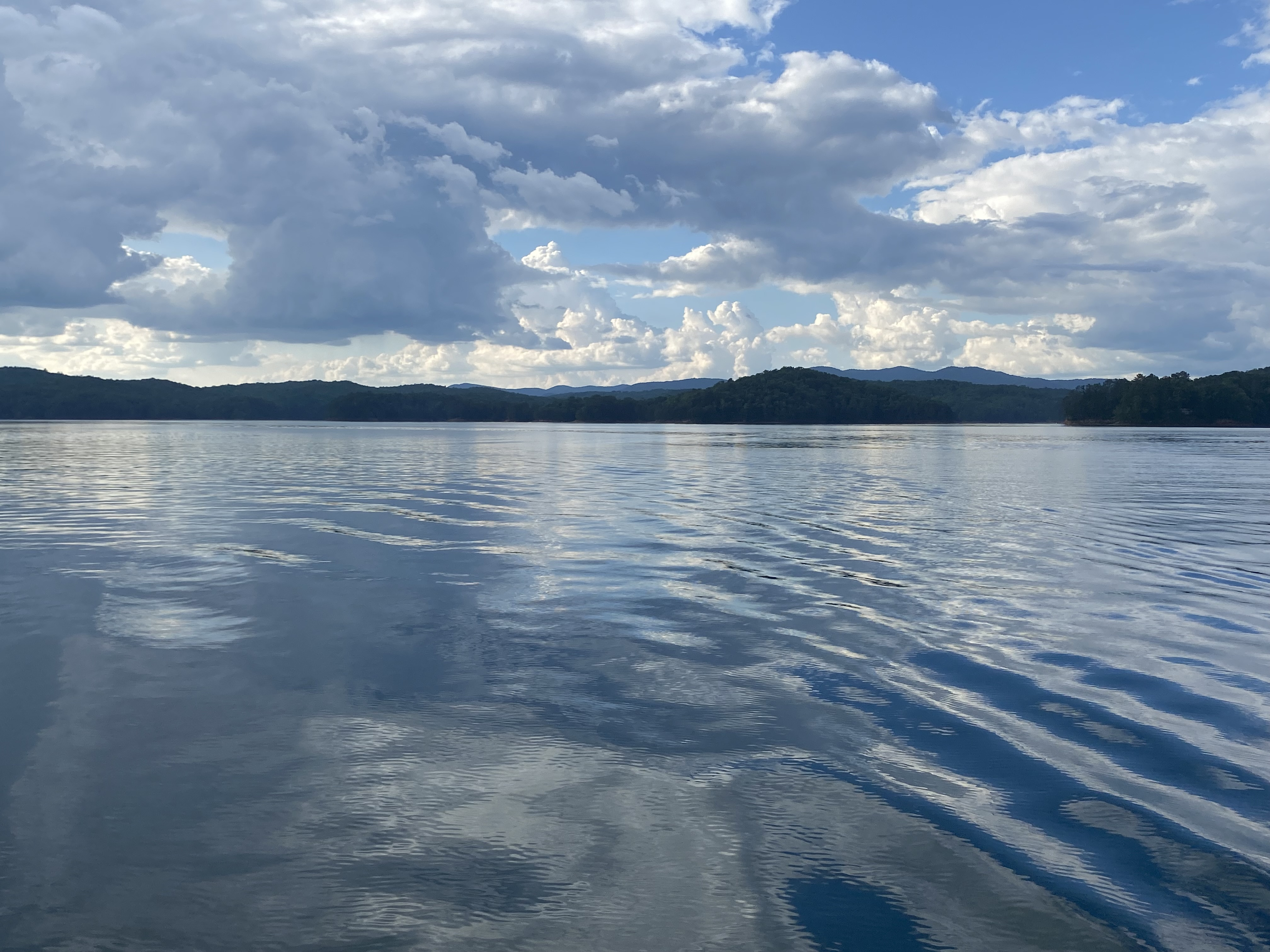
Calm Water

== See also ==
- List of dams and reservoirs in Georgia (U.S. state)
