= Blaine, Georgia =

Unincorporated community in Georgia, U.S.

Coordinates: 34°30′38″N 84°33′25″W

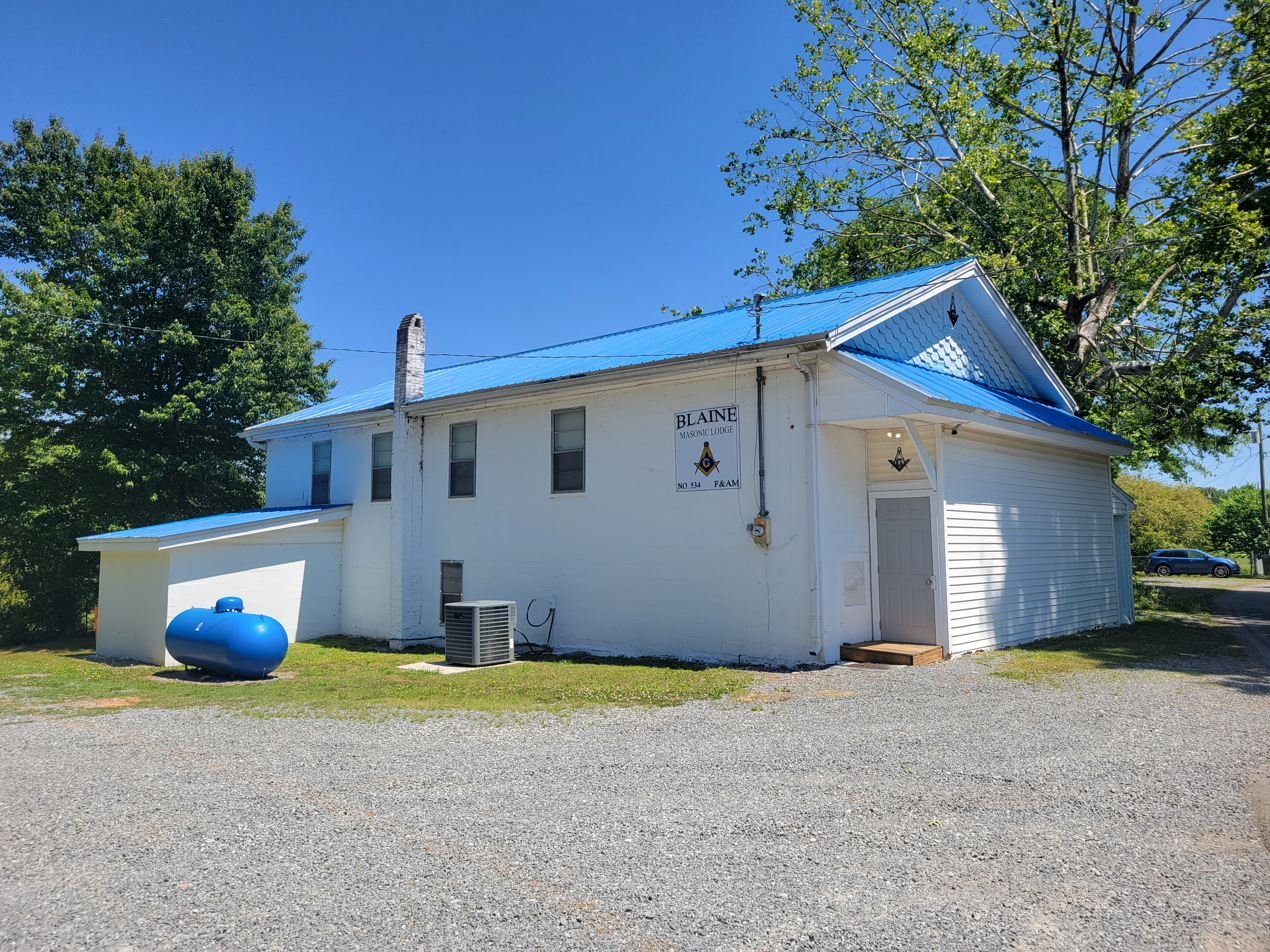
Blaine Masonic Lodge

Blaine is an unincorporated community in Pickens County, in the U.S. state of Georgia.

== History ==
A variant name was "Old Talking Rock". A post office called Blaine was established in 1889, and remained in operation until 1917. The community was named after James G. Blaine (1830–1893), an American politician and Speaker of the United States House of Representatives.
