= List of United States caving fatalities =

This is a list of caving fatalities in the United States.

Between 1980 and 2008, there were a total of 877 incident reports involving 1,356 individual cavers documented by the National Speleological Society (NSS) in their annual publication American Caving Accidents (ACA). These incidents often involve multiple factors and injuries for the same caver that are each recorded individually. The most common incident was being unable to exit a cave, such as being stranded or lost, (54%) and the second most common incident was caver fall (24%), resulting in 74% of traumatic injuries. Of the 1,356 cavers rescued over the 28-year period, fatality occurred in 81 (6%), averaging 3 deaths per year.

== List of fatalities ==
Date	Name	Cause	Cave	Location	Description	Reference
Feb 13, 1925	Floyd Collins	Starvation	Mammoth Cave	Mammoth Cave National Park, Kentucky	Floyd became trapped for 14 days after a large rock fell on his leg, eventually dying of starvation and exposure.	
May 28, 1967	Joe Chiara	Fall	Breathing Cave	Bath County, Virginia	Joe fell 50 feet and eventually died from concussion, a broken neck, and internal injuries.	
Jul 9 1967	Charles Richter	Fire	Carnegie Cave	Pennsylvania	The tar-lined drainpipe entrance caught fire from 2 candles and Charles crawled through the pipe, into the flames. He died 3 days later from burns covering 59% of his body.	
Jul 26, 1967	Charles Vaught & John Miller	CO poisoning	Staunton Quarry Cave	Virginia	A dynamite blast 3 days earlier left dangerous gases inside the cave.	
Sep 4, 1967	Douglas Evans	Fall	Vanishing River Cave	New Mexico	Douglas fell 100 feet, eventually dying from his injuries.	
Mar 10, 1999	Harold Allen (Hal) Bufford	Hypothermia	Ellisons Cave	Walker County, Georgia	Harold became stranded under a waterfall on a rope while ascending a 440-foot-deep pit.	
Apr 6, 1999	Robert Canady	Suffocation	Hermit Cave	Oklahoma	Robert became wedged at a constriction and was unable to free himself. Inadequate equipment and bad air contributed to this incident.	
Mar 16, 2000	Paul David Snowburg	Fall	Birds Drop	Virginia	Paul fell down the 150-foot entrance shaft and did not have a harness.	
Sep 30, 2000	Joe Ivy	Fall	O-9 Well	Texas	Joe fell 40 feet from a rope while ascending and became wedged in a slot he was unable to free himself from.	
Feb 25, 2001	Aaron Standage	Drowning	Redman Cave	Arizona	Aaron became wedged in a crevice while travelling a flooded passage.	
June 2001	Jeffrey Wayne Young	Fall/jump	Earthquake 90 Cave	Tennessee	Jeffrey either fell or jumped down a 70-foot pit while not wearing any caving equipment.	
July 4, 2001	Sharn Cleland	Rockfall	Unnamed	Lancaster County, Pennsylvania	Sharn became pinned under a rockfall and during rescue another collapse killed him.	
Dec 15, 2001	Dr. John Miller	Heart Attack	Tumbling Rock Cave	Alabama	While exiting the cave, Miller had a heart attack and struck his head after sliding down a slope.	
May 30, 2009	Robert Jones	Drowning	Blue Springs Cave	Orange City, Florida	Robert drowned while freediving.	
Nov 26, 2009	John Jones	Cardiac arrest	Nutty Putty Cave	Utah County, Utah	John became stuck upside down in a narrow crevice and died 27 hours later from cardiac arrest.	
Dec 16, 2009	Steven Troxell	Fall	Sloans Valley Cave System	Pulaski County, Kentucky	Steven slipped while climbing a 30-foot-deep pit, landing on his head.	
Jan 8, 2017	Charles Odom	Drowning	Eagles Nest Cave	Weeki Wachee, Florida		
Jan 29, 2017	Gregory Wilhelm	Drowning	Waianapanapa Freshwater Cave	Maui, Hawaii	Gregory swam with a friend in a cave using his cell phone as a flashlight but the reason for his drowning was not determined.	
Jul 18, 2018	Said Marjane	Drowning	Eagles Nest Cave	Weeki Wachee, Florida	Said drowned while freediving.	
Nov 24, 2019	Zhou Min	Drowning	Manatee Springs Cave System	Manatee Springs State Park, Florida	Zhou was pushed into a chimney by a strong current, becoming trapped.	
Jun 9, 2020	Clyde Douglas (Doug) Rorex	Drowning	Hole in the Wall Cave	Marianna, Florida	Clyde ran out of air while diving solo. His computer profile showed he was stopped for about 12 minutes, indicating an event may have kept him in one place.	
Jan 21, 2021	Thomas Brian Ellis	Drowning	Devil’s Eye Cave System	Ginnie Springs, Florida	Thomas was solo cave diving until losing consciousness due to the slider shut-off valve on the oxygen feed being accidentally closed.	
Oct 14, 2022	Eric Hahn	Drowning	Roaring River Cave	Missouri	Eric exceeded his maximum operating depth while cave diving, resulting in oxygen toxicity.	

== See also ==
- List of UK caving fatalities
- List of caves in the United States
- Caving equipment
