= Straight Gut Valley =

Valley in Georgia, United States

Coordinates: 34°41′58″N 85°18′58″W

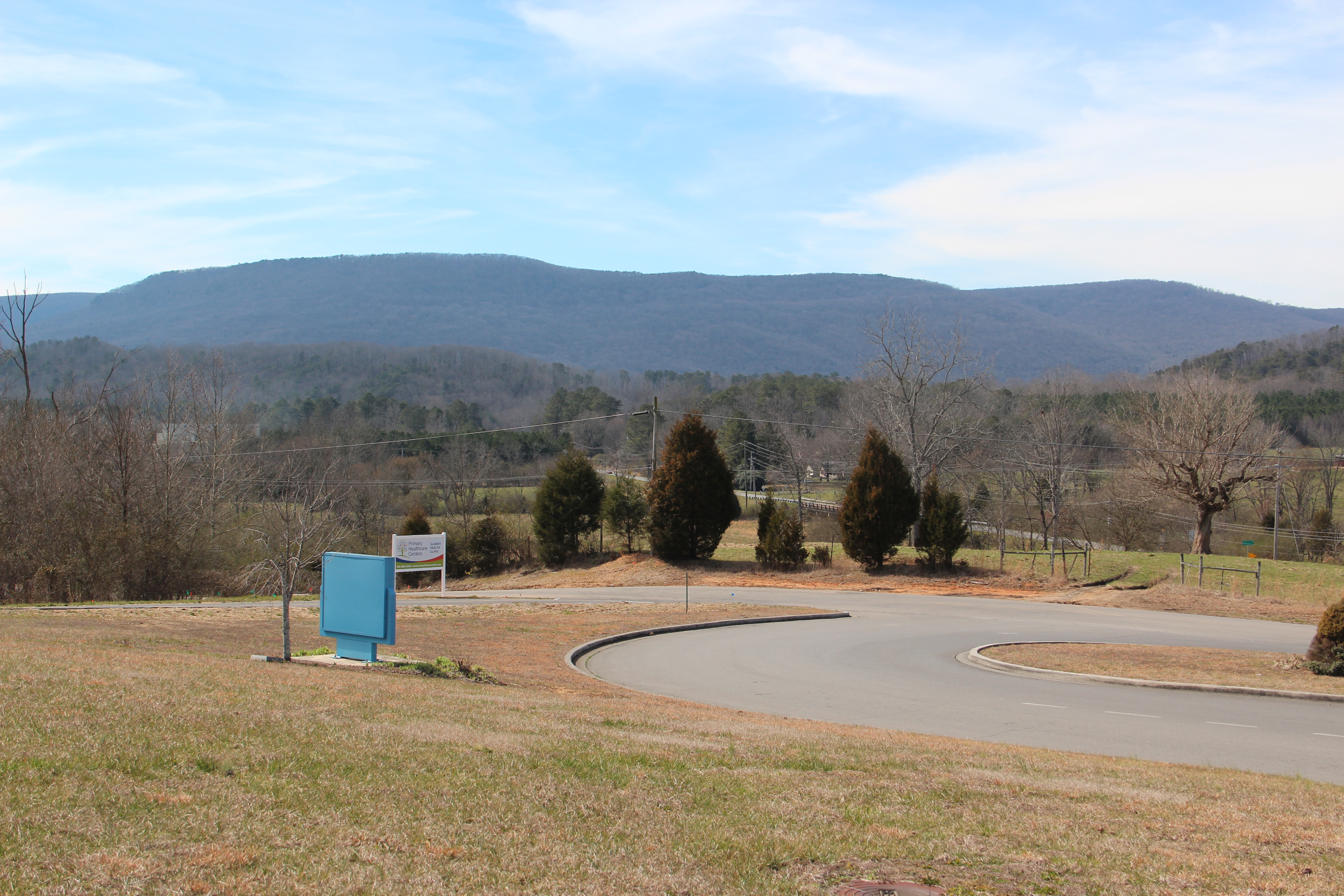
Straight Gut Valley, with Pigeon Mountain in the background

Straight Gut Valley (elevation: 801 feet (244 m)) is a valley in Walker County, in the U.S. state of Georgia.

Straight Gut Valley was named from the straight course of the stream in its "gut".
