= Joe Hollingsworth =

American football player (1925–1975)

No. 42, 37
- Position: Fullback

Personal information
- Born: June 20, 1925; Durham, Georgia, U.S.
- Died: August 18, 1975 (aged 50); Lynch, Kentucky, U.S.
- Listed height: 6 ft 0 in (1.83 m)
- Listed weight: 198 lb (90 kg)

Career information
- High school: Lynch (KY)
- College: Georgia, Eastern Kentucky

Career history
- Pittsburgh Steelers (1949–1951)

Awards and highlights
- National champion (1942); Rose Bowl champion (1943); Orange Bowl champion (1942)

Career statistics
- Rushing yards: 26
- Rush attempts: 14
- Games played: 31
- Games started: 2
- Return yards: 22
- Stats at Pro Football Reference

Joseph DeWitt Hollingsworth (June 20, 1925 – August 18, 1975) was an American football fullback who played for three seasons for the Pittsburgh Pirates of the NFL. He played college football at the University of Georgia for the Georgia Bulldogs football and Eastern Kentucky University for the Eastern Kentucky Colonels football team.
