= Georgia State Route 151 =

State highway in Georgia, United States

State Route 151
- Georgia State Route 151 highlighted in red

Route information
- Maintained by GDOT
- Length: 31.5 mi (50.7 km)

Major junctions
- South end: US 27 / SR 1 south of LaFayette
- North end: SR 321 at the Tennessee state line, in East Brainerd, Tennessee

Location
- Country: United States
- State: Georgia
- Counties: Walker, Catoosa

Highway system
- Georgia State Highway System; Interstate; US; State; Special
← SR 150	→ SR 152

State Route 151 (SR 151) is a 31.5-mile-long (50.7 km) state highway that runs southwest-to-northeast through portions of Walker and Catoosa counties in the northwestern part of the U.S. state of Georgia. The route connects the LaFayette area with the southeastern part of the Chattanooga, Tennessee area.

== Route description ==
SR 151 begins at an intersection with US 27/SR 1, south of LaFayette, in the southern part of Walker County, just north of the Chattooga County line. The road heads northeast to the unincorporated community of Naomi, where it intersects SR 136. The two highways have a short concurrency. After the concurrency ends, SR 151 continues to the northeast and enters Catoosa County. In Ringgold, SR 151 has an interchange with Interstate 75 (I-75). Almost immediately afterward is a brief concurrency with US 41/US 76/SR 2/SR 3. SR 151 departs to the north and continues until it meets its northern terminus, the Tennessee state line, where the roadway continues as Tennessee State Route 321.

SR 151 is not part of the National Highway System, a system of roadways important to the nation's economy, defense, and mobility.

== Major intersections ==
County	Location	mi	km	Destinations	Notes
Walker		0.0	0.0	US 27 / SR 1	Southern terminus
Walker	Naomi	8.6	13.8	SR 136 west (East Villanow Street) – LaFayette	Southern end of SR 136 concurrency
Walker	Chattahoochee–Oconee National Forest	10.1	16.3	SR 136 east – Villanow	Northern end of SR 136 concurrency
Walker	Chattahoochee–Oconee National Forest	11.9	19.2	SR 95 north – Rock Spring	Southern terminus of SR 95
Catoosa	Ringgold	25.0	40.2	I-75 (Larry McDonald Memorial Highway / SR 401) – Atlanta, Chattanooga	I-75 exit 348
Catoosa	Ringgold	25.6	41.2	US 41 north / US 76 west / SR 2 west / SR 3 north (Nashville Street)	Southern end of US 41/US 76/SR 2/SR 3 concurrency
Catoosa	Ringgold	26.4	42.5	US 41 south / US 76 east / SR 2 east / SR 3 south (Nashville Street) / US 41 Truck north / US 76 Truck west – Dalton	Northern end of US 41/US 76/SR 2/SR 3 concurrency; southern end of US 41 Truck/US 76 Truck concurrency
Catoosa	Ringgold			US 41 Truck south / US 76 Truck east / SR 151 Spur south (High Street)	Northern end of US 41 Truck/US 76 Truck concurrency
Catoosa	Tennessee state line	31.5	50.7	SR 321 north (Ooltewah Ringgold Road) – Ooltewah	Northern terminus; roadway continues as SR 321.
1.000 mi = 1.609 km; 1.000 km = 0.621 mi: Concurrency terminus

== Ringgold spur route ==
State Route 151 Spur
- Location: Ringgold

State Route 151 Spur (SR 151 Spur) is an 0.3-mile-long (0.48 km) spur route that carries US 41 Truck and US 76 Truck around an 11-foot-7-inch (3.53 m) railroad bridge in Ringgold. The route begins along Evitt Street and travels to the north. Across from the intersection with Vermont Street, the Ringgold Fire Station can be found. The fire department property ends across from the wye intersection with Kittle Street, where the road makes a reverse curve closer to the railroad tracks. The routes make a left turn at High Street and immediately have a grade crossing with the tracks. Only two other intersections exist along this segment (North Street, and Depot Street) before SR 151 Spur finally ends at the SR 151 mainline at the Ringgold City Hall.

The CSX railroad crossing at High and Evitt Streets served by the spur is the main route for tractor trailers to get through the city, since the nearby underpass on Highway 41 blocks any trucks from passing through due to its low clearance of 11 feet 7 inches. The historic Ringgold Depot, listed on the National Register of Historic Places in 1978, is located along US 41 near the spur route. Built around 1850 as a station on the Western and Atlantic Railroad, the stone depot measures 33 by 192 feet.
