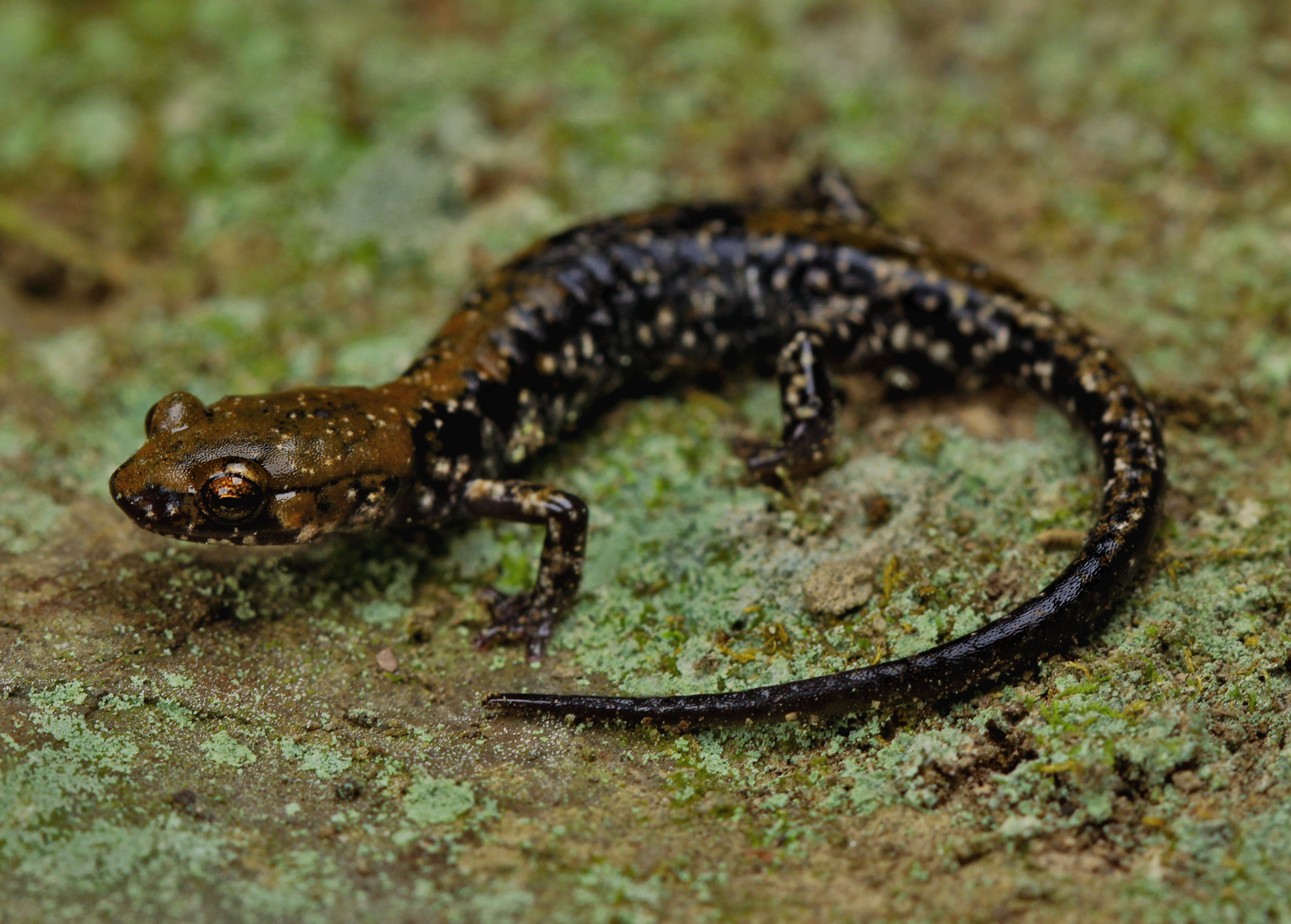

Conservation status
- Vulnerable (IUCN 3.1)

Scientific classification
- Kingdom: Animalia
- Phylum: Chordata
- Class: Amphibia
- Order: Urodela
- Family: Plethodontidae
- Genus: Plethodon
- Species: P. petraeus

Binomial name
- Plethodon petraeus Wynn, Highton & Jacobs, 1988

= Pigeon Mountain salamander =

Species of amphibian

The Pigeon Mountain salamander (Plethodon petraeus) is a species of salamander in the family Plethodontidae. It is endemic to Pigeon Mountain in the US state of Georgia.

Its natural habitats are temperate forests, rocky areas, and caves. It is threatened by habitat loss.

== Physical description ==
P. Petraeus is one of the larger species within its genus with fully grown males reaching up to 80 mm SVL (Snout-vent length) and fully grown females reaching up to 84.3 mm SVL. Both males and females have a reddish-brown coloration on their chins as well as running from the backs of their heads, along their backs, and onto their tails. White spots and brass colored spots line the abdomen, tail, and limbs of this species. Furthermore, their feet are webbed, flattened, and broad while they have bulbous, forward facing eyes.

== Range ==
The Pigeon Mountain Salamander (Plethodon petraeus) is a species of salamander only found on Pigeon Mountain, located in the northwestern region of the state of Georgia in the United States. This salamander lives on only a 17 kilometer strip of land on the eastern side of Pigeon Mountain, making it an endemic species to this location. Within this strip of land, P. petraeus is found in sparsely located caves and rocky outcrops. Despite the lack of abundance of these caves and outcrops, P. petraeus can be found in great numbers at these locations.

== Threats ==
Because this species of salamander lives in such a small territory, it is highly vulnerable to extinction. Any disturbance to this area poses a threat to P. Petraeus as one disturbance affects the entire limited range of this species. This is especially true in the case of climate change as higher elevations are becoming warmer and losing their ability to maintain moisture levels. In the case of P. Petraeus, the loss of moisture within the eastern side of Pigeon Mountain can diminish the amount of land in which the species is able to dwell, raising the potential for extinction of the salamander. Additionally, the increase in the spread of the fungus chytrid can serve as a means of extinction for these salamanders.

Because of the vulnerability of this species, the Georgia Department of Natural Resources has named P. Petraeus as a rare and protected species. Furthermore, P. Petraeus has been placed on the IUCN Red List as an "At-Risk" species because of its small geographical range. Fortunately, the eastern side of Pigeon Mountain is steep and relatively undisturbed by humans and other large mammals.

== Recovery plan ==
The Amphibian Foundation has created a conservation program known as the Conservation Research Bridge Program in attempt to resist the extinction of P. Petraeus. This program has worked in accordance with the Georgia Department of Natural Resources to create a captive breeding program whose aim is to increase the amount of P. Petraeus that exist on Earth. This captively bred colony can be used to replace the wild colony of P. Petraeus in the case of chytrid infection or any other means of extinction. Very little research has been done on this species, aside from work that has been done by K. Donlon et al. indicating that low genetic diversity exists within this species.
