= Forest Hays Jr. =

American politician

Member of the Georgia House of Representatives from the 1st district
- In office January 11, 1971 – September 30, 1987
- Preceded by: William J. Crowe
- Succeeded by: Robert H. McCoy

Personal details
- Born: June 8, 1928 High Point, Georgia, U.S.
- Died: September 30, 1987 (aged 59) Flintstone, Georgia, U.S.
- Party: Democratic
- Spouse: Miriam MacLean (m. 1951)
- Children: 2
- Occupation: Businessman

Military service
- Allegiance: United States
- Branch/service: United States Navy
- Years of service: 1946–1948

Forest Hays Jr. (June 8, 1928 – September 30, 1987) was an American politician in the state of Georgia.

== Early life and education ==
Hays was born in High Point, Georgia, in 1928, and attended the now-demolished Chattanooga Valley High School. From 1946 to 1948, he was a seaman in the United States Navy.

In 1954, Hays began operating a business in nearby Chattanooga, Tennessee. It specialized in radio and television sales and service.

== Political career ==
Hayes was elected to the Georgia House of Representatives as a member of the Democratic Party in 1970. He represented parts of Northwest Georgia continuously from 1971 until his unexpected death in 1987. At the end of his tenure in the House, Hayes sat on three committees: Defense & Veterans Affairs; Game, Fish & Recreation; and State Institutions & Properties, for he served as the committee's vice chairman.

During his time as a state representative, Hayes resided in Flintstone, Georgia, and was a practicing Baptist.

== Death ==
Hays died on September 30, 1987.
