= Georgia State Route 341 =

Highway in Georgia, United States

State Route 341
- SR 341 highlighted in red

Route information
- Maintained by GDOT
- Length: 15.5 mi (24.9 km)
- Existed: 1963–present

Major junctions
- South end: SR 193 in Davis Crossroads
- SR 136 north-northeast of Davis Crossroads
- North end: SR 193 in Chattanooga Valley

Location
- Country: United States
- State: Georgia
- Counties: Walker

Highway system
- Georgia State Highway System; Interstate; US; State; Special
← US 341	→ SR 342

State Route 341 (SR 341) is a 15.5-mile-long (24.9 km) north–south state highway located entirely within Walker County in the northwestern part of the U.S. state of Georgia. It connects the unincorporated community of Davis Crossroads with Chattanooga Valley, via Chickamauga.

== Route description ==
SR 341 begins at an intersection with SR 193 in Davis Crossroads, northwest of LaFayette. It travels to the northeast and curves to the north-northeast, along the West Chickamauga Creek valley, to the town of Chickamauga. The route then turns to the northwest. Just before entering Chattanooga Valley, it curves to a northerly routing. In Chattanooga Valley, SR 341 meets its northern terminus, another intersection with SR 193.

SR 341 is not part of the National Highway System, a system of roadways important to the nation's economy, defense, and mobility.

== History ==
Between 1960 and 1963, SR 341 was established along its current routing. The route remains unchanged since then.

== Major intersections ==
The entire route is in Walker County.

Location	mi	km	Destinations	Notes
Davis Crossroads	0.0	0.0	SR 193 – LaFayette	Southern terminus
	3.3	5.3	SR 136 (Hasty Lane) – LaFayette, Trenton	
Chattanooga Valley	15.5	24.9	SR 193 – Chattanooga	Northern terminus
1.000 mi = 1.609 km; 1.000 km = 0.621 mi
