= Davis Crossroads, Georgia =

Unincorporated community in Georgia, U.S.

Coordinates: 34°45′19″N 85°22′05″W

Davis Crossroads is an unincorporated community in Walker County, in the U.S. state of Georgia. It is located along the crossroads of State Routes 193 and 341

== History ==
The community was named for the Davis family, the original owners of the town site.
