= Rocktown =

Rocktown may refer to:

- Rocktown (Georgia), a rock-climbing area in Georgia.
- Rocktown, New Jersey, an unincorporated community in New Jersey.
