= Georgia State Route 193 =

State highway in Georgia, United States

State Route 193
- Georgia State Route 193 highlighted in red

Route information
- Maintained by GDOT
- Length: 27.2 mi (43.8 km)

Major junctions
- South end: US 27 / SR 1 / SR 136 in LaFayette
- US 27 Bus. / SR 1 Bus. in LaFayette
- North end: SR 17 southeast of Lookout Mountain

Location
- Country: United States
- State: Georgia
- Counties: Walker

Highway system
- Georgia State Highway System; Interstate; US; State; Special
← SR 192	→ SR 194

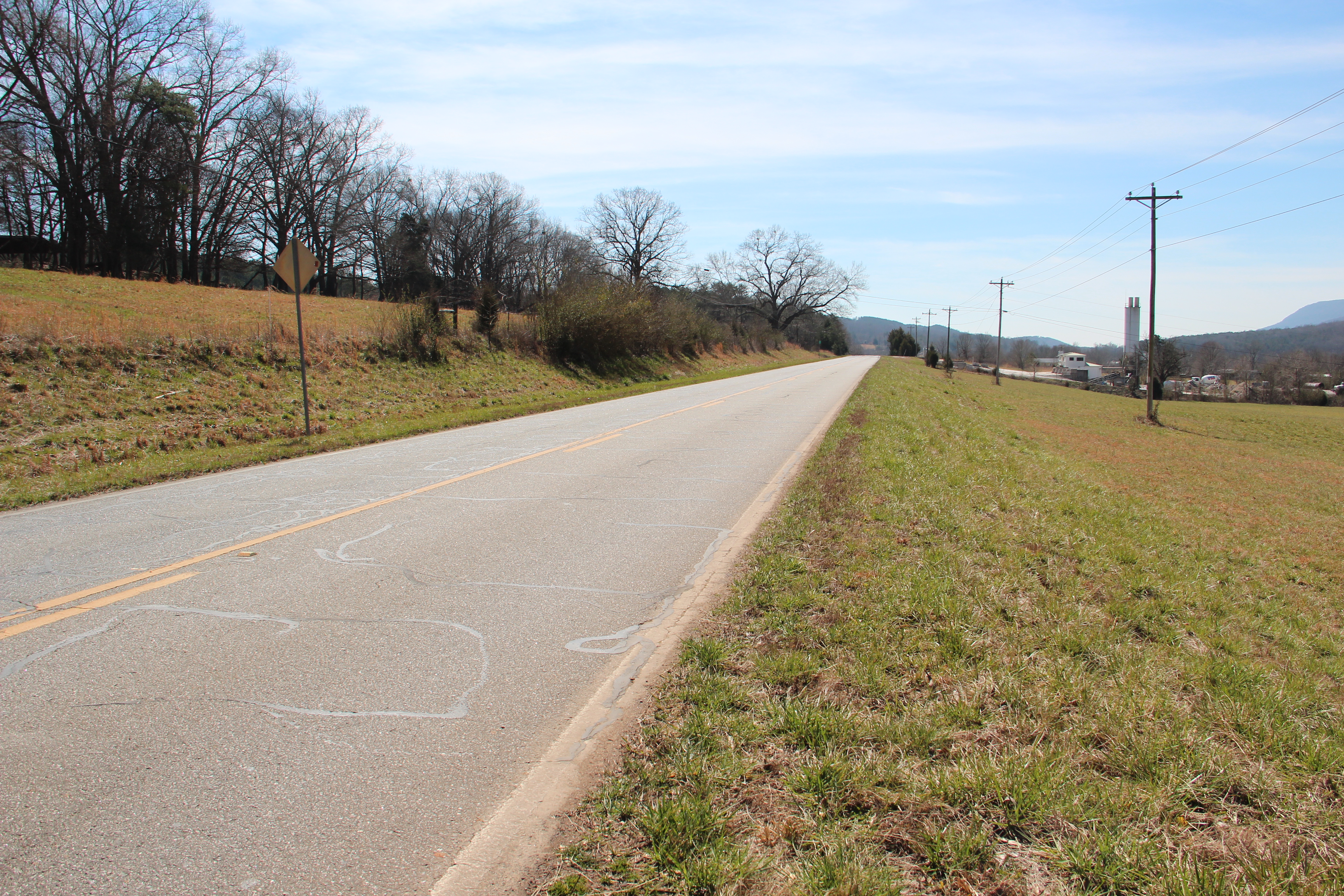
State Route 193 near Pigeon Mountain

State Route 193 (SR 193) is a 27.2-mile-long (43.8 km) state highway in the northwestern part of the U.S. state of Georgia. It runs southeast-to-north through portions of Walker county.

== Route description ==
SR 193 begins at an intersection with US 27/SR 1 (Lyle Jones Parkway) in LaFayette. This intersection also contains SR 136 (East Villanow Street). The road heads west into the main part of town, where it has a concurrency with US 27 Business/SR 1 Business. The road continues west out of town and gradually curves to the northwest and intersects SR 341 (Cove Road). It then curves to the northeast and has a second intersection with SR 136 (Lookout Mountain Scenic Highway). In Chattanooga Valley, there is a second intersection with SR 341 (Chickamauga Road). Just northeast of Chattanooga Valley is SR 2 (Battlefield Parkway). SR 193 continues to the northeast until it meets its northern terminus, Tennessee State Route 17, at the Tennessee state line, southeast of Lookout Mountain, Tennessee.

== Major intersections ==
The entire route is in Walker County.

Location	mi	km	Destinations	Notes
LaFayette	0.0	0.0	US 27 / SR 1 / SR 136 – Summerville, Fort Oglethorpe, Resaca	
LaFayette	0.4	0.64	US 27 Bus. north / SR 1 Bus. north (North Main Street)	Southern end of US 27 Business/SR 1 concurrency
LaFayette	0.7	1.1	US 27 Bus. south / SR 1 Bus. south (South Main Street)	Northern end of US 27 Business/SR 1 concurrency
Davis Crossroads	8.8	14.2	SR 341 north (Cove Road) – Chickamauga	Southern terminus of SR 341
	14.0	22.5	SR 136 (Lookout Mountain Scenic Highway) – Trenton	
Chattanooga Valley	22.7	36.5	SR 341 south (Chickamauga Road) – Chickamauga	Northern terminus of SR 341
	24.6	39.6	SR 2 east (Battlefield Parkway) – Fort Oglethorpe	Western terminus of SR 2
	27.2	43.8	SR 17 north (St. Elmo Avenue) – Chattanooga	Continuation beyond Tennessee state line (southeast of Lookout Mountain)
1.000 mi = 1.609 km; 1.000 km = 0.621 mi: Concurrency terminus
