= Pettyjohn Cave =

Cave in Georgia (US)

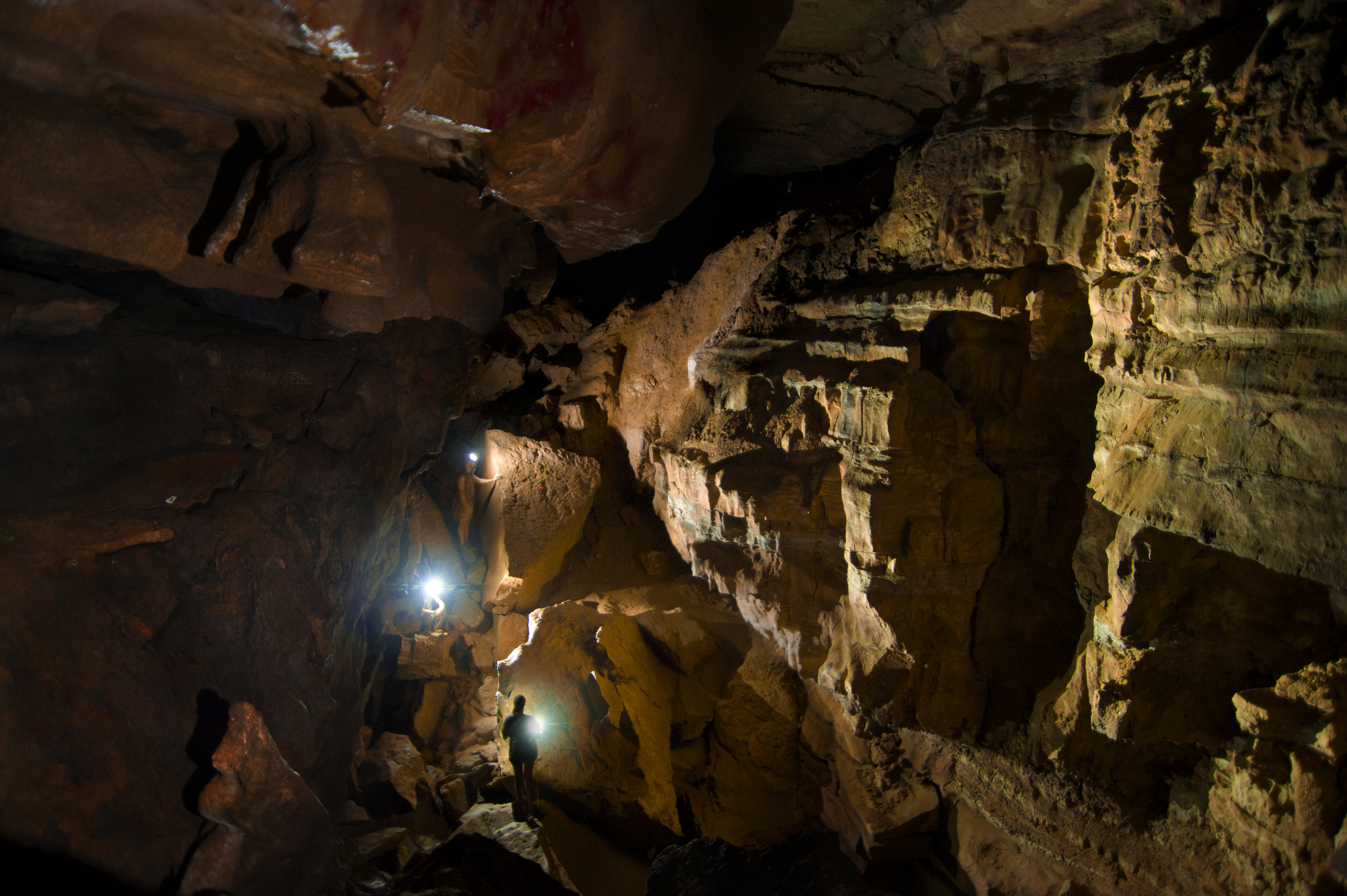
- First Room of Pettyjohn Cave

- Location within the United States
- Location: Walker County, Georgia, U.S.
- Coordinates: 34°39′51″N 85°21′50″W
- Nearest city: LaFayette

Pettyjohn Cave (also known as Wilsons Cave, Pettyjohn's Cave, Petty John's Cave, and other similar spellings) is a karst cave located in Walker County, Georgia on the east side of Pigeon Mountain in the Appalachian Plateau of Northwest Georgia. It has a surveyed length of 31,490 ft and reaches a depth of 235 ft. The cave is accessible via a path from a gravel parking area on the side of Rocky Lane. Out of the 242 listed, it is 119th longest cave in the United States as declared by the Georgia Speleological Survey.

== Formations ==
Formations in Pettyjohn Cave include:

- Stalagmites that are a type of speleothem that rises from the floor of a limestone cave due to the dripping of mineralized solutions and the deposition of calcium carbonate.
- Stalactites are also found in the cave. These formations hang from the ceiling or wall of the cave.
- There are also pillars, soda straws, cave pearls, flowstones, and cave popcorn are other formations in the cave.
- Waterfalls can be found in the stream passage section.

== Wildlife ==
This cave hosts tricolored bats and little brown bats during their winter hibernation because temperatures are low but remain above freezing. Their food consists entirely of insects such as small beetles, moths, and gnats.

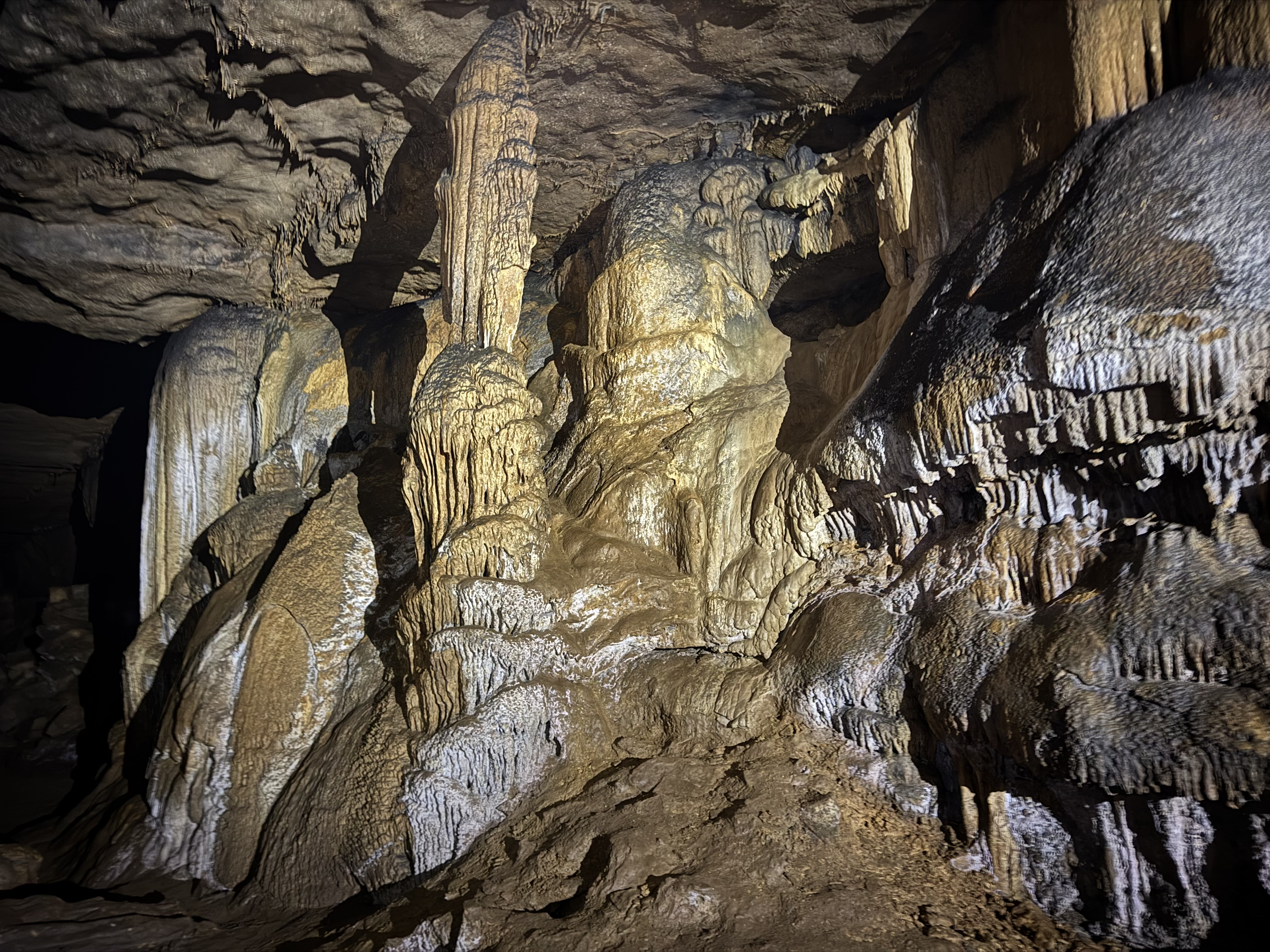
Formations within the cave

== See also ==
- Ellison's Cave
