= East Armuchee, Georgia =

Unincorporated community in Georgia, U.S.

Coordinates: 34°37′35″N 85°07′49″W

East Armuchee is an unincorporated community in Walker County, in the U.S. state of Georgia.

== History ==
According to one source, Armuchee is a name derived from the Cherokee language meaning "hominy". Another source asserts it means "land of the flowers".
