= Georgia State Route 95 =

State highway in Georgia, United States

State Route 95
- SR 95 highlighted in red

Route information
- Maintained by GDOT
- Length: 7.8 mi (12.6 km)
- Existed: 1930s–present

Major junctions
- South end: SR 151 near Catlett
- North end: US 27 / SR 1 in Rock Spring

Location
- Country: United States
- State: Georgia
- Counties: Walker

Highway system
- Georgia State Highway System; Interstate; US; State; Special
| ← I-95 | → SR 96 |

State Route 95 (SR 95) is a 7.8-mile-long (12.6 km) state highway that travels southeast-to-northwest entirely within the northeastern portion of Walker county in the northwestern part of the U.S. state of Georgia. It connects the Catlett area with Rock Spring. Its southern terminus is an intersection with SR 151 south-southeast of Catlett. Its northern terminus is an intersection with US 27/SR 1 in Rock Spring

== Route description ==
SR 95 begins at an intersection with SR 151 south-southeast of Catlett and northeast of LaFayette, in the northeastern part of Walker County. This intersection is along the northwestern edge of the Armuchee-Cohutta Ranger District of the Chattahoochee–Oconee National Forest. It heads to the north-northwest through rural portions of the county. The highway curves to the northwest and crosses over Little Chickamauga Creek before entering Catlett. There, it curves back to the north-northwest. It then travels over the Peavine Ridge. SR 95 curves to the west and crosses over Peavine Creek. After curving back to the north-northwest, it passes Rock Spring Elementary School. The highway crosses over Rock Spring Creek before entering the southern part of Rock Spring. It passes the Rock Spring Athletic Association, whose entrance is across the street from the Walker County Local Government Services building. It curves to the northwest and meets its northern terminus, an intersection with US 27/SR 1. Here, the roadway continues to the northwest as Rock Spring Drive.

== History ==
Originally a route built and maintained by the Department of the Interior as part of Chickamauga and Chattanooga National Military Park, SR 95 was designated in the 1930s when the National Park Service ceded control of roads outside of the park. Originally extending from SR 143 (now SR 136) to US 27 in Rock Spring, the highway was truncated to SR 151 when SR 151 was extended south to US 27. Not a major highway, the route has otherwise seen very little change since it was first commissioned and bisects the Round Pond community, noted on maps as Catlett (the store there carries the Catlett name). However, guide signs on US 27/SR 1 identify Catlett as a control city.

== Major intersections ==
The entire route is in Walker County.

| Location | mi | km | Destinations | Notes |
|---|---|---|---|---|
| | 0.0 | 0.0 | SR 151 | Southern terminus |
| Rock Spring | 7.8 | 12.6 | US 27 / SR 1 – LaFayette, Chattanooga | Northern terminus |
1.000 mi = 1.609 km; 1.000 km = 0.621 mi
