= Collegedale, Tennessee =

- City
- Motto: Justice, Safety, Efficiency
- Location in Hamilton County, Tennessee
- Coordinates: 35°3′6″N 85°2′49″W
- Country: United States
- State: Tennessee
- County: Hamilton
- Incorporated: 1968

Government
  - Type: City Manager-Commission
  - City Manager: Wayon Hines

Area
  - Total: 12.03 sq mi (31.16 km^{2})
  - Land: 12.03 sq mi (31.16 km^{2})
  - Water: 0 sq mi (0.00 km^{2})
- Elevation: 791 ft (241 m)

Population (2020)
  - Total: 11,109
  - Density: 923.4/sq mi (356.52/km^{2})
- Time zone: UTC-5 (Eastern (EST))
  - Summer (DST): UTC-4 (EDT)
- ZIP code: 37302, 37315, 37353, 37363
- Area code: 423
- FIPS code: 47-16300
- GNIS feature ID: 1280968
- Website: www.collegedaletn.gov

Collegedale is a city in Hamilton County, Tennessee, United States. The population was 11,109 at the 2020 census. Collegedale is a suburb of Chattanooga and is part of the Chattanooga, TN-GA Metropolitan Statistical Area. Collegedale is home to Southern Adventist University. The median household income is one of the highest in Hamilton County. It has been ranked as one of the best and safest places to live in Tennessee. The unincorporated community of Ooltewah is an enclave in Collegedale.

== History ==
Collegedale was founded as the site of Southern Adventist University (then Southern Junior College) in 1916. It was incorporated under a city manager government in 1968. J.M. Ackerman was the first city manager, and Fred Fuller served as the city's first mayor.

== Geography ==
Collegedale is located in southeastern Hamilton County at 35°3′6″N 85°2′49″W (35.051578, -85.047004), in the valley of Wolftever Creek. Just west of the city center, the creek cuts through White Oak Mountain, forming Collegedale Gap. Tennessee State Route 317 passes through the city center and Collegedale Gap, leading southeast 10 miles (16 km) to State Route 60 and northwest 4 miles (6 km) to Interstate 75 in the northeastern outskirts of Chattanooga. Downtown Chattanooga is 19 miles (31 km) west of Collegedale. Tennessee State Route 321 runs through the western part of Collegedale, leading north to U.S. routes 11 and 64 just north of Ooltewah and south 5 miles (8 km) to the Georgia state line.

As of the 2010 census, the city had a total area of 9.9 square miles (25.6 km^{2}), all of it recorded as land.

== Demographics ==
Historical population
Census	Pop.	Note	%±
1970	3,031		—
1980	4,607		52.0%
1990	5,048		9.6%
2000	6,514		29.0%
2010	8,282		27.1%
2020	11,109		34.1%
2025 (est.)	11,499	▲	3.5%

=== Racial and ethnic composition ===
Collegedale city, Tennessee – Racial and ethnic composition Note: the US Census treats Hispanic/Latino as an ethnic category. This table excludes Latinos from the racial categories and assigns them to a separate category. Hispanics/Latinos may be of any race.
Race / Ethnicity (NH = Non-Hispanic)	Pop 2000	Pop 2010	Pop 2020	% 2000	% 2010	% 2020
White alone (NH)	5,362	6,173	8,112	82.32%	74.54%	73.02%
Black or African American alone (NH)	310	550	831	4.76%	6.64%	7.48%
Native American or Alaska Native alone (NH)	28	29	27	0.43%	0.35%	0.24%
Asian alone (NH)	194	334	410	2.98%	4.03%	3.69%
Native Hawaiian or Pacific Islander alone (NH)	1	20	14	0.02%	0.24%	0.13%
Other race alone (NH)	7	17	72	0.11%	0.21%	0.65%
Mixed race or Multiracial (NH)	108	132	436	1.66%	1.59%	3.92%
Hispanic or Latino (any race)	504	1,027	1,207	7.74%	12.40%	10.87%
Total	6,514	8,282	11,109	100.00%	100.00%	100.00%

=== 2020 census ===
As of the 2020 census, there was a population of 11,109, with 3,979 households and 2,485 families residing in the city. The median age was 32.9 years, 15.1% of residents were under the age of 18, and 18.5% were 65 years of age or older. For every 100 females there were 93.4 males, and for every 100 females age 18 and over there were 93.0 males. 92.2% of residents lived in urban areas, while 7.8% lived in rural areas. There were 3,979 households in Collegedale, of which 25.3% had children under the age of 18 living in them. Of all households, 48.3% were married-couple households, 18.4% were households with a male householder and no spouse or partner present, and 29.3% were households with a female householder and no spouse or partner present. About 31.3% of all households were made up of individuals and 12.5% had someone living alone who was 65 years of age or older. There were 4,367 housing units, of which 8.9% were vacant. The homeowner vacancy rate was 1.3% and the rental vacancy rate was 5.7%.

Racial composition as of the 2020 census
Race	Number	Percent
White	8,466	76.2%
Black or African American	846	7.6%
American Indian and Alaska Native	36	0.3%
Asian	414	3.7%
Native Hawaiian and Other Pacific Islander	16	0.1%
Some other race	444	4.0%
Two or more races	887	8.0%

=== 2000 census ===
As of the census of 2000, there was a population of 6,514, with 2,049 households and 1,528 families residing in the city. The population density was 781.6 inhabitants per square mile (301.8/km^{2}). There were 2,199 housing units at an average density of 263.9 per square mile (101.9/km^{2}). The racial makeup of the city was 90.55% White, 4.37% African American, 0.01% Native American, 0.01% Asian, 0.03% Pacific Islander, 2.87% from other races, and 2.16% from two or more races. Hispanic or Latino of any race were 7.74% of the population.

There were 2,049 households, out of which 33.3% had children under the age of 18 living with them, 61.0% were married couples living together, 10.7% had a female householder with no husband present, and 25.4% were non-families. 20.5% of all households were made up of individuals, and 7.0% had someone living alone who was 65 years of age or older. The average household size was 2.57 and the average family size was 2.96.

In the city the population was spread out, with 19.8% under the age of 18, 25.2% from 18 to 24, 25.4% from 25 to 44, 16.7% from 45 to 64, and 13.0% who were 65 years of age or older. The median age was 29 years. For every 100 females there were 88.5 males. For every 100 females age 18 and over, there were 85.6 males.

The median income for a household in the city was $42,270, and the median income for a family was $52,337. Males had a median income of $37,819 versus $28,345 for females. The per capita income for the city was $18,604. About 5.3% of families and 7.4% of the population were below the poverty line, including 10.5% of those under the age of 18 and 4.0% of those 65 and older.

Collegedale has a large Seventh-day Adventist community and in 2005 was described as an "enclave" for the religion by Charles Reagan Wilson and Mark Silk.

== Economy ==
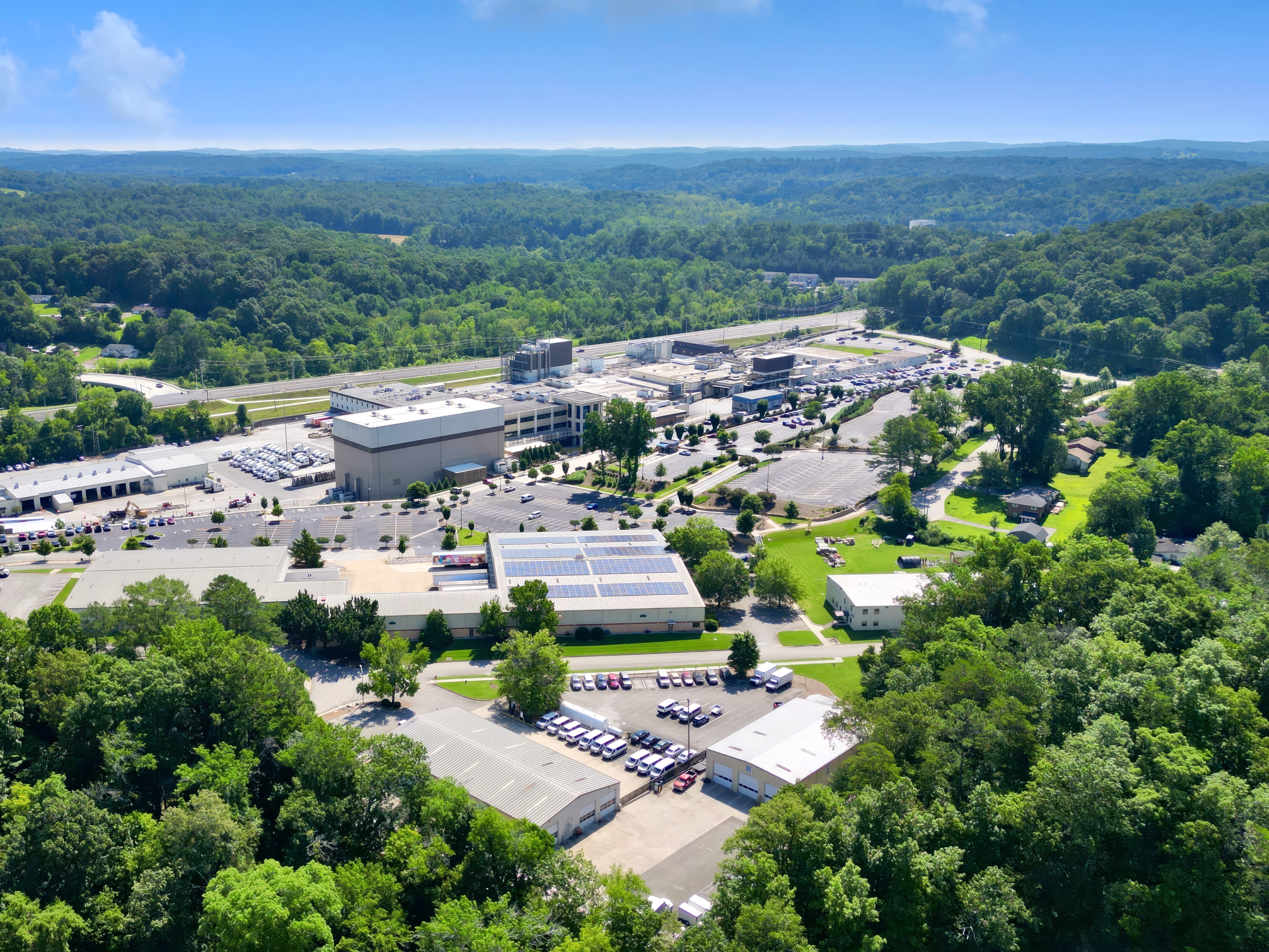
McKee Foods headquarters and plant in Collegedale

McKee Foods is headquartered in Collegedale. Originally launched in Chattanooga in 1934, the company moved to a facility on the campus of Southern Adventist University in 1956. McKee Foods is the producer of Little Debbie and Sunbelt snack foods.

== Arts and culture ==
In August 2011, the city took over control of the Collegedale Public Library, which was previously operated under the Hamilton County library system. Library membership is available on a paid subscription basis, free to residents of Collegedale.

== Parks and recreation ==
Six parks are managed by the Parks & Recreation Department of Collegedale:

- East Hamilton County Park has a high school baseball field and three youth fields.
- Wolftever Creek Greenway is a greenway which spans throughout the city and continues to be expanded upon by the city.
- Collegedale Dog Park provides dog-owners with a dog park for unleashed dog socialization.
- Imagination Station & Pavilion is a playground and rental space located behind City Hall with a train theme.
- The Nature Nook is an amphitheatre built by the East Hamilton County Kiwanis Club for the city.
- Veterans Memorial Park is located along the Wolftever Creek Greenway and features plaques, sculptures and flags as a memorial to United States war veterans.
- Little Debbie Park is a park that opened in 2023 and features a children's zipline, fiberglass sculptures of Little Debbie snack cakes and wide walking paths.

The town has youth and adult softball leagues. It also has four pickleball courts adjacent to the Imagination Station and City Hall.

== Government ==
Collegedale was incorporated in 1968. It operates under a City Manager-Commission form of government. Five commissioners are elected by popular vote and they are responsible for choosing a city manager, who then proceeds to implement the commissions policies.

On 5 August 2013, Collegedale became the first city in Tennessee to extend health benefits to same-sex couples.

== Postal service ==
The city of Collegedale has a unique situation in terms of postal service. The city has its own zip code and post office however the Collegedale post office only does post office boxes and not mail delivery. The city's mail and package delivery is handled by the three other zip codes in which the city is located: Apison 37302, McDonald 37353 and Ooltewah 37363.

== Education ==
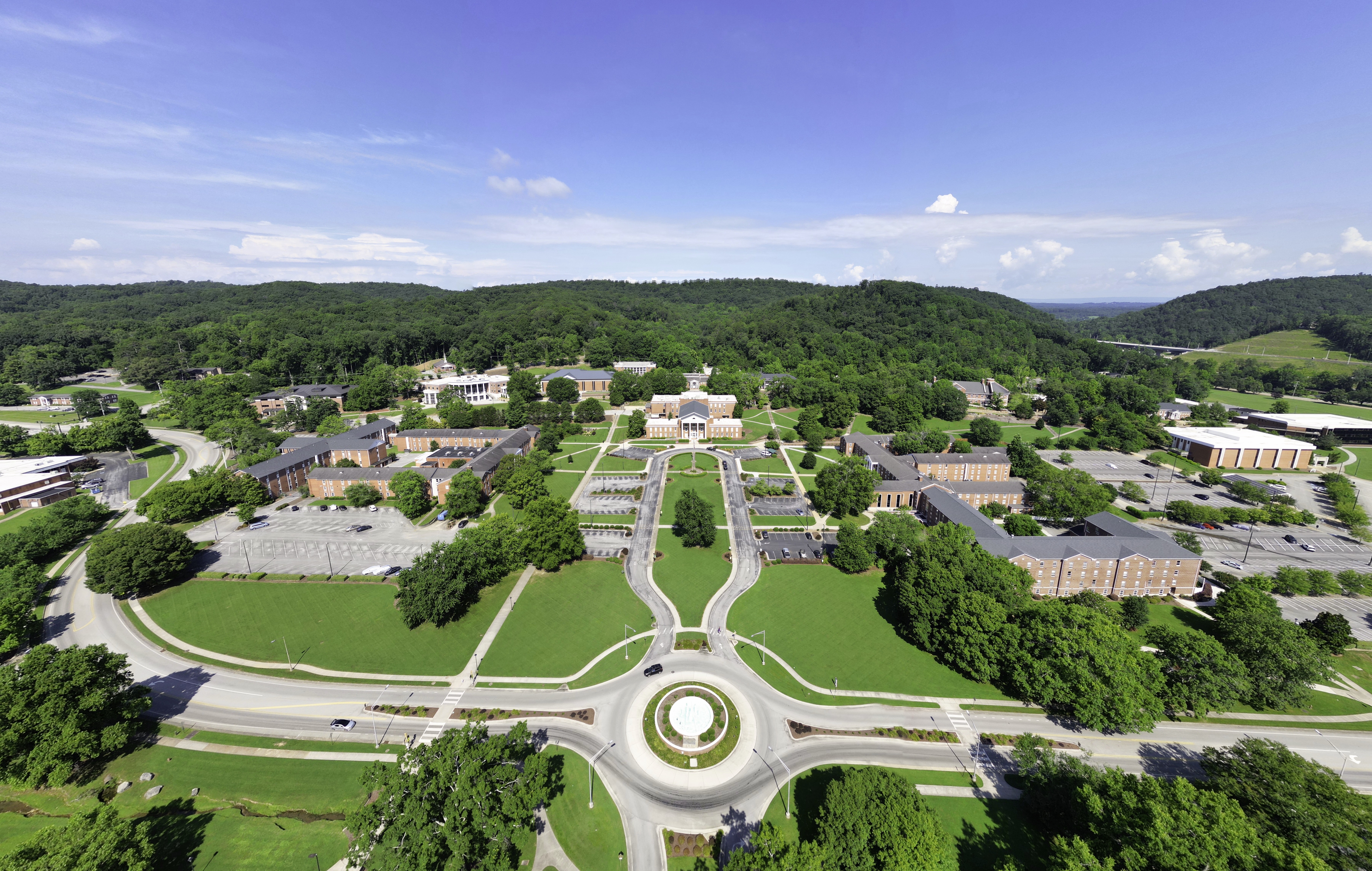
Southern Adventist University campus

Southern Adventist University, a private Seventh-day Adventist university, is located in Collegedale. It has an affiliated K-12 education system, Collegedale Academy, which includes Collegedale Academy Middle School, and Collegedale Academy Elementary.

Wolftever Creek Elementary School and Ooltewah Middle School are the two public schools inside of city limits. Both schools belong to the Hamilton County Schools system.

== Infrastructure ==
=== Transportation ===
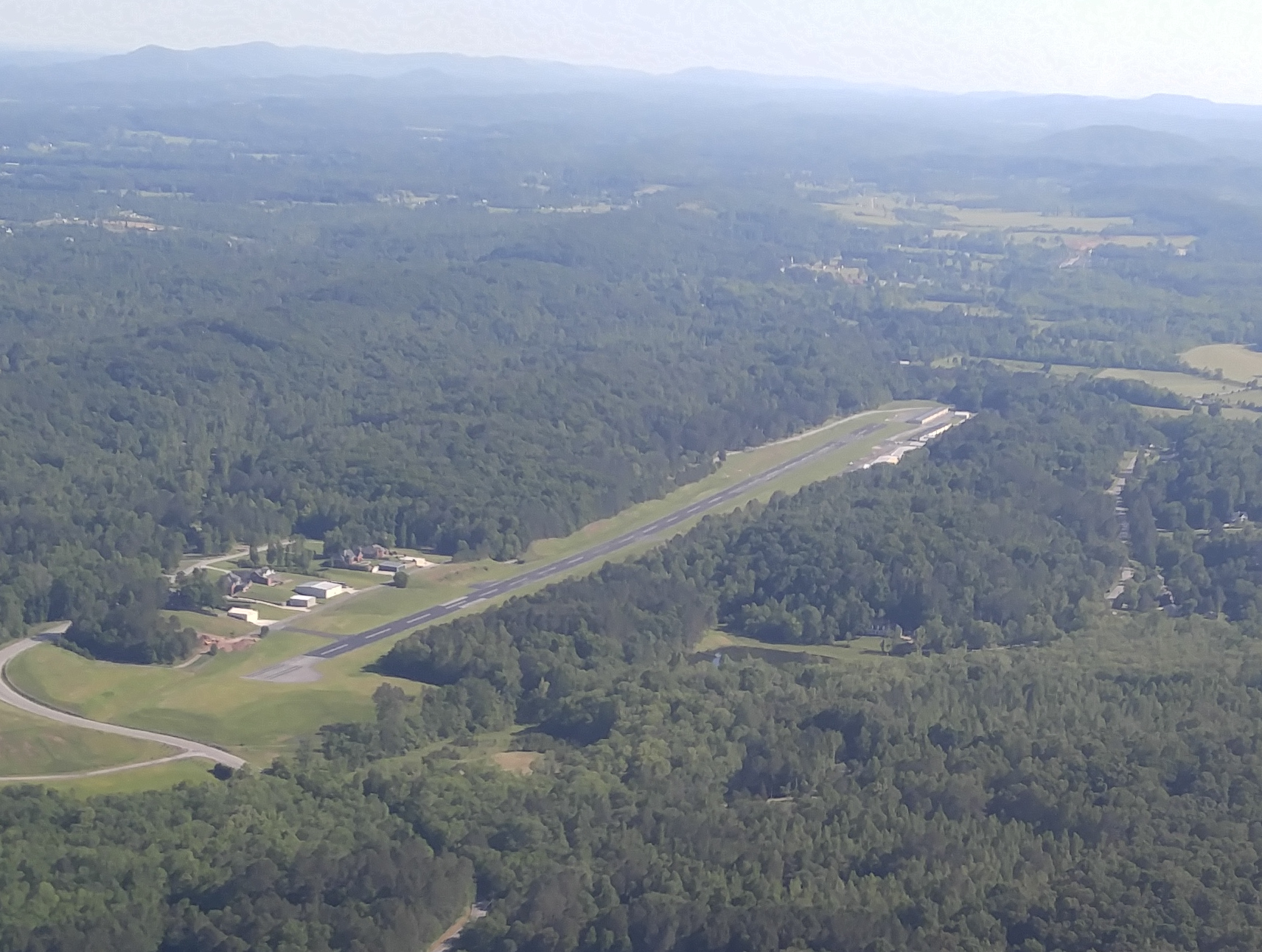
Collegedale airport

The city is located just off the I-75 corridor. Collegedale Municipal Airport is owned by the city of Collegedale and has about 120 aircraft stationed there. In 2003, the airport was awarded the Tennessee Aeronautics Commission's "Airport of the Year" title.

=== Utilities ===
Collegedale has a recycling program which requires the public to bring their recyclables to the city public works department. The city uses recycling to reduce the costs of landfill waste disposal and offsets the cost of recycling by selling the recyclable materials. Comcast provides cable services and CenturyLink supplies landline phone services. Electricity is supplied by EPB and the Chattanooga Gas Company supplies gas needs. The city and/or Hamilton County handles resident sewer needs and Eastside Utility District handles water services.

=== Health & safety ===
The city utilizes Hamilton County Emergency Medical Services for emergency medical services and contracts fire & rescue services to the Tri-Community Volunteer Fire Department located in Collegedale. The local volunteer fire department, at Station 1, has 100 members and support staff and an ISO Class 2 rating. The Collegedale Police Department provides police services for the city.
