= Tennessee State Route 321 =

Highway in Tennessee, USA

State Route 321
- Ooltewah Ringgold Road
- SR 321 highlighted in red

Route information
- Maintained by TDOT
- Length: 7.1 mi (11.4 km)
- Existed: July 1, 1983–present

Major junctions
- South end: SR 151 at the Georgia state line near East Brainerd
- SR 320 in East Brainerd; SR 317 in Collegedale
- North end: US 11 / US 64 in Ooltewah

Location
- Country: United States
- State: Tennessee
- Counties: Hamilton

Highway system
- Tennessee State Routes; Interstate; US; State
← US 321	→ SR 322

State Route 321 (SR 321) is a north–south state highway located entirely in Hamilton County in southeastern Tennessee. It traverses mainly the eastern outskirts of Chattanooga, and its eastern suburbs.

== Route description ==
From the Georgia state line and the northern terminus of Georgia State Route 151, SR 321 begins a northerly course to intersect State Routes 320 and 317, the latter of which is located in Collegedale. Its northern terminus is at a junction with US 11/64 and SR 2 in Ooltewah. It is known as Ooltewah Ringgold Road for the entirety of its length.

== Major intersections ==
The entire route is in Hamilton County.

Location	mi	km	Destinations	Notes
	0.0	0.0	SR 151 south (Ooltewah Ringgold Road) – Ringgold	Southern terminus at the Georgia state line
East Brainerd			SR 320 west (East Brainerd Road) – Chattanooga	Eastern terminus of SR 320
Collegedale			SR 317 (Apison Pike) to I-75 – Chattanooga, Apison	
Ooltewah			US 11 / US 64 (SR 2) to I-75 – Chattanooga, Cleveland	Northern terminus
1.000 mi = 1.609 km; 1.000 km = 0.621 mi
