= Hinkles, Georgia =

Unincorporated community in Georgia, U.S.

Coordinates: 34°54′30″N 85°23′40″W

Hinkles is an unincorporated community in Walker County, in the U.S. state of Georgia.

== History ==
A post office called Hinkles was established in 1914 and remained in operation until discontinued in 1930. The community was named for the Hinkle family, the original landowners.
