= Apison, Tennessee =

- Census-designated place
- Location within Tennessee Location within the United States
- Coordinates: 35°01′26″N 85°01′26″W
- Country: United States
- State: Tennessee
- County: Hamilton

Area
  - Total: 16.19 sq mi (41.93 km^{2})
  - Land: 16.18 sq mi (41.91 km^{2})
  - Water: 0.0039 sq mi (0.01 km^{2})
- Elevation: 860 ft (260 m)

Population (2020)
  - Total: 4,428
  - Density: 273.6/sq mi (105.65/km^{2})
- Time zone: UTC-5 (Eastern (EST))
  - Summer (DST): UTC-4 (EDT)
- ZIP code: 37302
- Area code(s): 423 and 729
- GNIS feature ID: 1275817

Apison is an unincorporated community and census-designated place (CDP) in Hamilton County, Tennessee, United States. It is a rural area east of the city of Chattanooga, and it is near Ooltewah, Collegedale, and north Georgia to the south. It is part of the Chattanooga, TN–GA Metropolitan Statistical Area. As of the 2020 census, its population was 4,428.

Apison is fifteen miles (24 km) from Enterprise South Industrial Park, the location of Volkswagen North America.

== History ==
In 1881, the railroad came through a small settlement, now known as Apison, that had previously had its mail delivered by horse and buggy. The town then was known as O'Brian that was assigned by the railroad officials. The name was later changed because of another Tennessee town already having the same name. Due to the large deposits of Apison shale rock found along the railroad tracks, the town was renamed to its current name.

In 2001, the old Apison Elementary School was turned into a Tres Dias retreat center.

== Demographics ==
Historical population
| Census | Pop. | Note | %± |
|---|---|---|---|
| 2020 | 4,428 | | — |
U.S. Decennial Census

=== 2020 census ===
As of the 2020 census, Apison had a population of 4,428. The median age was 42.2 years. 25.1% of residents were under the age of 18 and 17.3% of residents were 65 years of age or older. For every 100 females there were 98.5 males, and for every 100 females age 18 and over there were 97.1 males age 18 and over.

6.6% of residents lived in urban areas, while 93.4% lived in rural areas.

There were 1,539 households in Apison, of which 38.5% had children under the age of 18 living in them. Of all households, 70.8% were married-couple households, 11.8% were households with a male householder and no spouse or partner present, and 15.9% were households with a female householder and no spouse or partner present. About 17.0% of all households were made up of individuals and 8.0% had someone living alone who was 65 years of age or older.

There were 1,648 housing units, of which 6.6% were vacant. The homeowner vacancy rate was 1.5% and the rental vacancy rate was 4.7%.

Apison racial composition
| Race | Number | Percentage |
|---|---|---|
| White (non-Hispanic) | 3,717 | 83.94% |
| Black or African American (non-Hispanic) | 99 | 2.24% |
| Native American | 9 | 0.2% |
| Asian | 84 | 1.9% |
| Pacific Islander | 4 | 0.09% |
| Other/Mixed | 228 | 5.15% |
| Hispanic or Latino | 287 | 6.48% |

== Popular culture ==
Apison was depicted in the X-Files episode "The Field Where I Died."

== Education ==
Apison itself currently has two public schools operated by Hamilton County Schools: Apison Elementary School located on 10433 East Brainerd Road, and East Hamilton Middle School located on 3550 Bentwood Cove Drive. Meanwhile, high school students that reside in Apison will attend East Hamilton High School located on Ooltewah-Ringgold Road in Ooltewah, Tennessee.
