= Battle of Davis's Cross Roads =

Battle of the American Civil War

Coordinates: 34.7557°N 85.3680°W

- Part of the American Civil War
Date	September 10, 1863 – September 11, 1863
Location	Dade County, Georgia and Walker County, Georgia
Result	Inconclusive

Belligerents
United States (Union)	(Confederate States of America) CSA (Confederacy)

Commanders and leaders
James S. Negley	Thomas C. Hindman; John C. Breckinridge

Strength
8,000	12,000

Casualties and losses
- Unknown

The Battle of Davis's Cross Roads, was fought September 10–11, 1863, in northwestern Georgia, as part of the Chickamauga Campaign of the American Civil War. It was more of a series of maneuvers and skirmishes than an actual battle and casualties were negligible.

== Background ==
In the initial stages of the campaign, Union Maj. Gen. William S. Rosecrans's Army of the Cumberland induced the Confederate Army of Tennessee under Gen. Braxton Bragg to evacuate the city of Chattanooga, Tennessee. Rosecrans dispatched three corps on three different roads toward northwestern Georgia. The corps on the center road was the XIV Corps under Maj. Gen. George H. Thomas, which moved just across the border to Trenton, Georgia, and prepared to move on to Lafayette in pursuit of Bragg. Lafayette was the present location of Bragg's army. Due to misinformation and poor intelligence, Rosecrans was convinced that Bragg was demoralized and was retreating to Dalton, Georgia, farther to the southeast. But once he realized that the Union forces had separated and were vulnerable, Bragg intended to attack Thomas, halt his advance, and defeat him.

== Battle ==
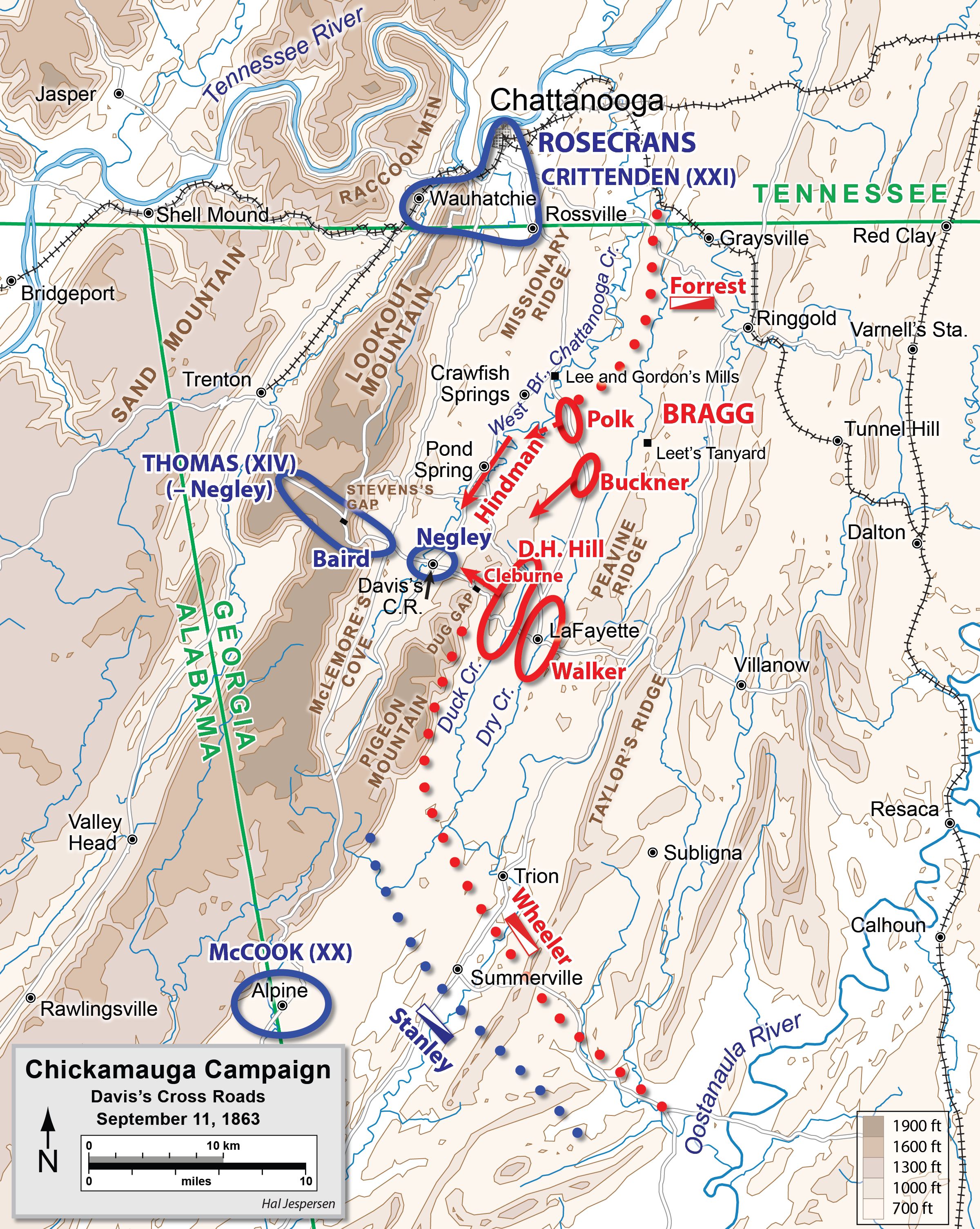
Situation, September 11, 1863. Confederate Union

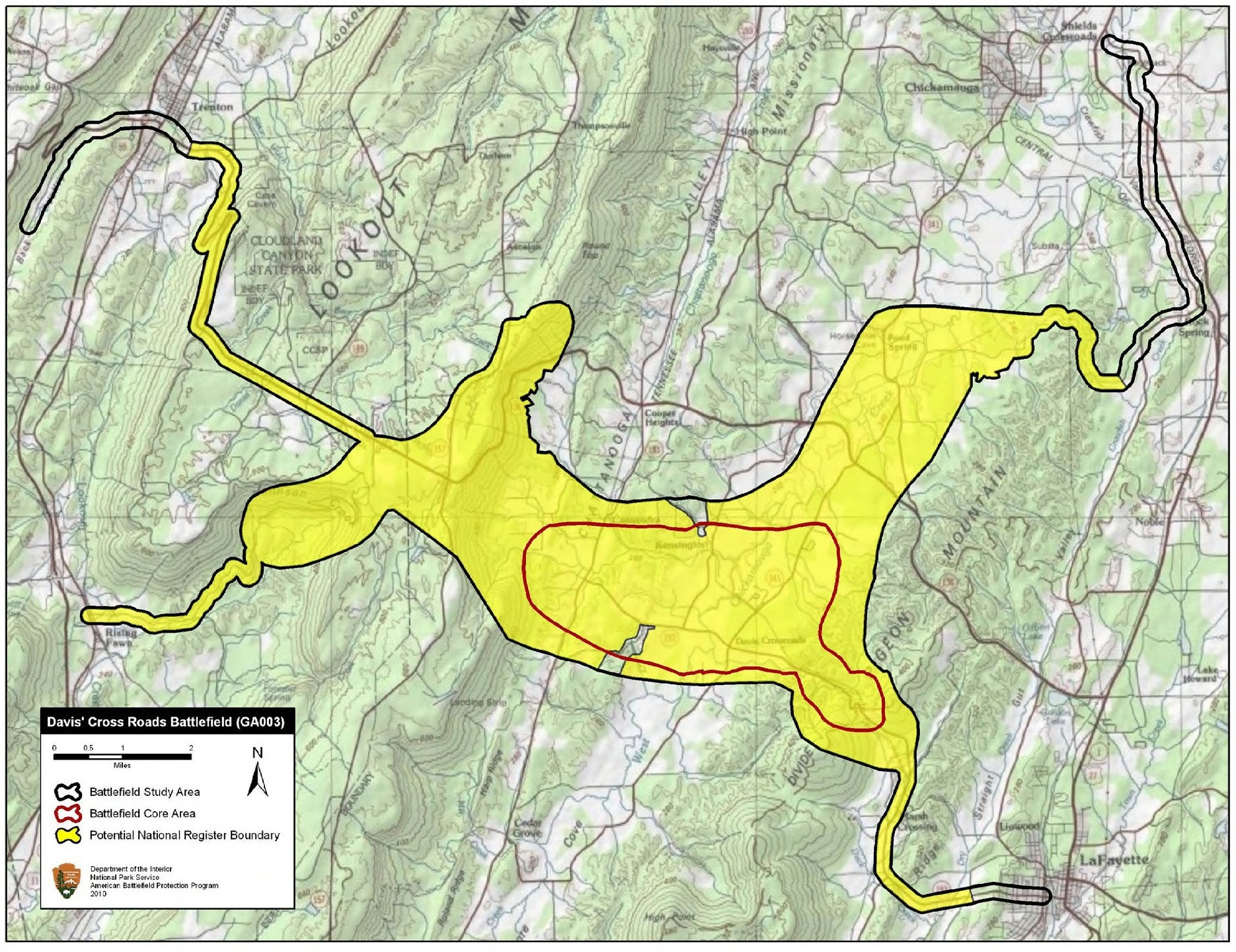
Map of Davis' Cross Roads Battlefield core and study areas by the American Battlefield Protection Program.

Thomas's corps raced forward, seized the important gaps in Lookout Mountain, and moved out into McLemore Cove. Maj. Gen. James S. Negley's division, supported by Brig. Gen. Absalom Baird's division, was moving across the mouth of the cove on the Dug Gap road when Negley learned that Confederate units were concentrating around Dug Gap. Moving through determined resistance, he closed on the gap, withdrawing to Davis' Cross Roads in the evening of September 10 to await the supporting division.

Bragg had ordered Maj. Gen. Thomas C. Hindman with his division to assault Negley in the flank at Davis's Cross Roads, while Maj. Gen. Patrick Cleburne's division forced its way through Dug Gap to strike Negley in front. Hindman was to receive reinforcements for this movement, but most of them did not arrive. The Confederate officers, therefore, met and decided that they could not attack in their present condition. The next morning, however, fresh troops did arrive, and the Confederates began to move on the Union line. The supporting Union division had by now joined Negley, and, hearing of a Confederate attack, the Union forces determined that a strategic withdrawal to Stevens Gap was in order. Negley first moved his division to the ridge east of West Chickamauga Creek, where it established a defensive line. The other division then moved through them to Stevens Gap and established a defensive line there. Both divisions awaited the rest of Thomas's corps. All of this was accomplished under constant pursuit and fire from the Confederates.

== Aftermath ==
After his abortive attempt to attack one isolated Union corps, Bragg turned his attention to the corps to his north, the XXI Corps under Maj. Gen. Thomas L. Crittenden, setting the stage for the bloody Battle of Chickamauga on September 19.
