= Pigeon Mountain (Georgia) =

Mountain in the US State of Georgia

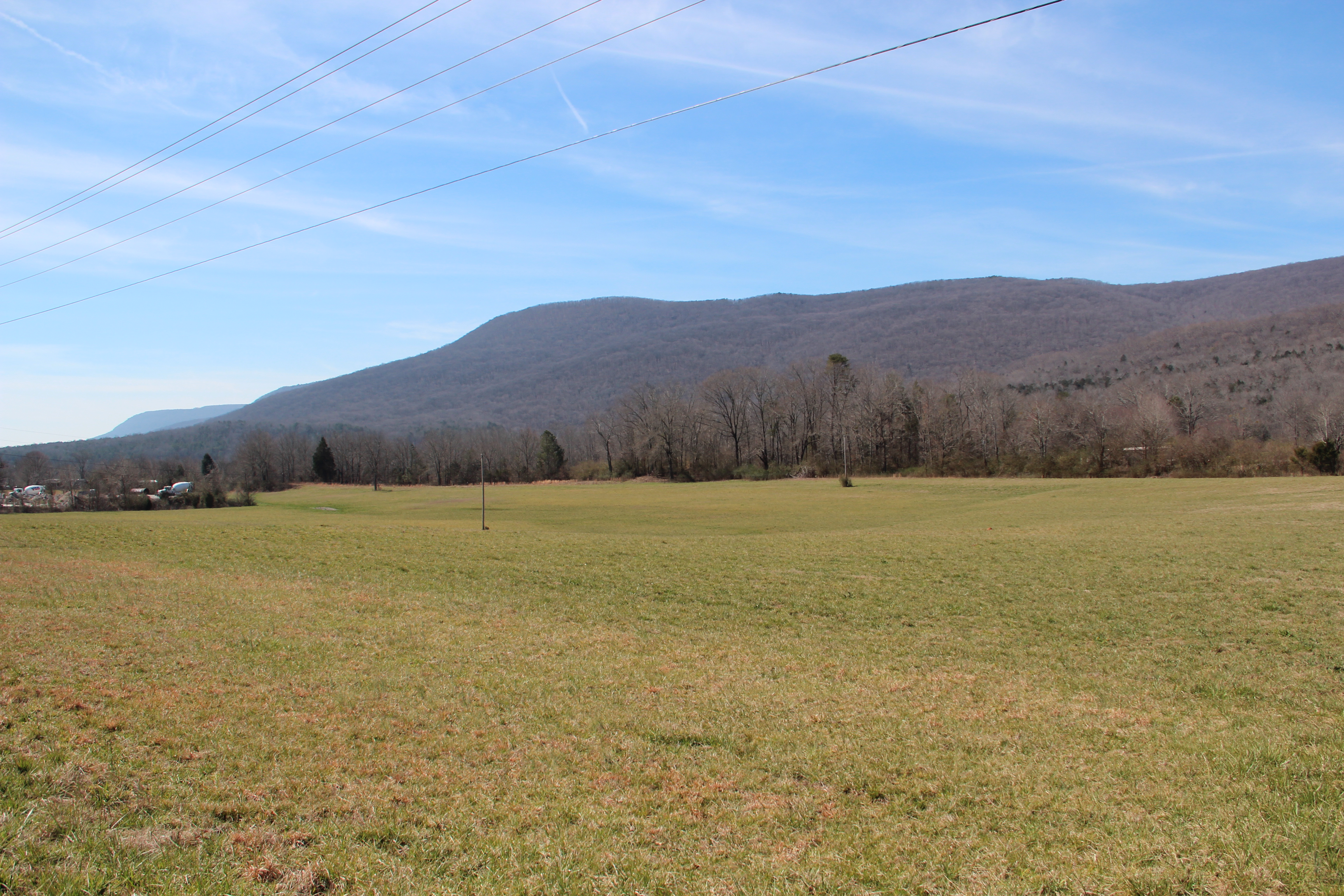
- Pigeon Mountain, viewed from Georgia State Route 193

Highest point
- Elevation: 2,330 ft (710 m)
- Coordinates: 34.698472°N 85.384326°W

Geography
- Location within Georgia
- Location: Walker County, Georgia, U.S.
- Parent range: Cumberland Plateau
- Topo map: USGS LaFayette

Geology
- Mountain type: Plateau

Climbing
- First ascent: Unknown
- Easiest route: Hike

Pigeon Mountain is a summit in Walker County, Georgia. At its highest point, the mountain has an elevation of around 2,330 feet (710 m). Ellison's Cave and Petty John's Cave are both located on the mountain. Most of the mountain is located inside the Crockford-Pigeon Mountain Wildlife Management Area.

== Name origin ==
The origin of the name is yet unknown. Pigeon Mountain may have been named because the peak's outline resembles a pigeon or because settlers saw a large flock of pigeons there.

== Geography ==
Pigeon Mountain is located to the west of LaFayette in the Cumberland Plateau. At its highest point, the mountain has an elevation of around 2,330 feet (710 m). The mountain runs in a northwest-southwest direction for about 10 miles, joining with Lookout Mountain on the southwestern end to form a V-shape. Between Pigeon and Lookout Mountains is a valley called the McLemore Cove. The Tennessee Valley Divide crosses the western side of the mountain. The Georgia Department of Natural Resources maintains the Crockford-Pigeon Mountain Wildlife Management Area, which includes most of Pigeon Mountain.

Several caves are located on Pigeon Mountain, including Ellison's Cave and Petty John's Cave. At the top of the mountain is Rocktown, a free face rock climbing area. Other features on Pigeon Mountain include the Dug Gap, Rape Gap and The Pocket.

== History ==
Part of the Battle of Davis's Cross Roads took place at Pigeon Mountain, fought on September 10 and 11 in 1863. During the battle, Union forces under James S. Negley intended to cross Pigeon Mountain to capture LaFayette. However, upon learning about how Confederate soldiers were concentrating at Dug Gap, Negley decided to withdraw his troops back to Davis’ Cross Roads.

During the 1920s and 1930s, Pigeon Mountain was home to about 30 families. Those families abandoned the mountain in the 1930s, when the water table was lowered. The Georgia Department of Natural Resources leased the mountain in 1969. The area eventually became the Crockford-Pigeon Mountain Wildlife Management Area. The WMA was named after Jack Crockford, the director of the Georgia Game and Fish Division in the 1970s who helped implement Georgia's white-tailed deer restoration program.

== See also ==
- List of mountains in Georgia (U.S. state)
