= High Point, Georgia =

Unincorporated community in Georgia, U.S.

Coordinates: 34°51′48″N 85°22′01″W

High Point is a CDP and unincorporated community in Walker County, in the U.S. state of Georgia.

== History ==
A post office called High Point was established in 1856, and remained in operation until it was discontinued in 1922. The community was named from its lofty elevation near Lookout Mountain.
