= Durham, Georgia =

Unincorporated community in Georgia, U.S.

Coordinates: 34°51′29″N 85°25′57″W

Durham is an unincorporated community in Walker County, in the U.S. state of Georgia.

== History ==
Durham was first called Pittsburg; the present name is after the Durham Coal and Coke Company. A post office called Pittsburg was in operation from 1900 until 1946.
