= McLemore Cove =

Valley in Georgia, United States

Coordinates: 34°44′45.99″N 85°23′13.50″W

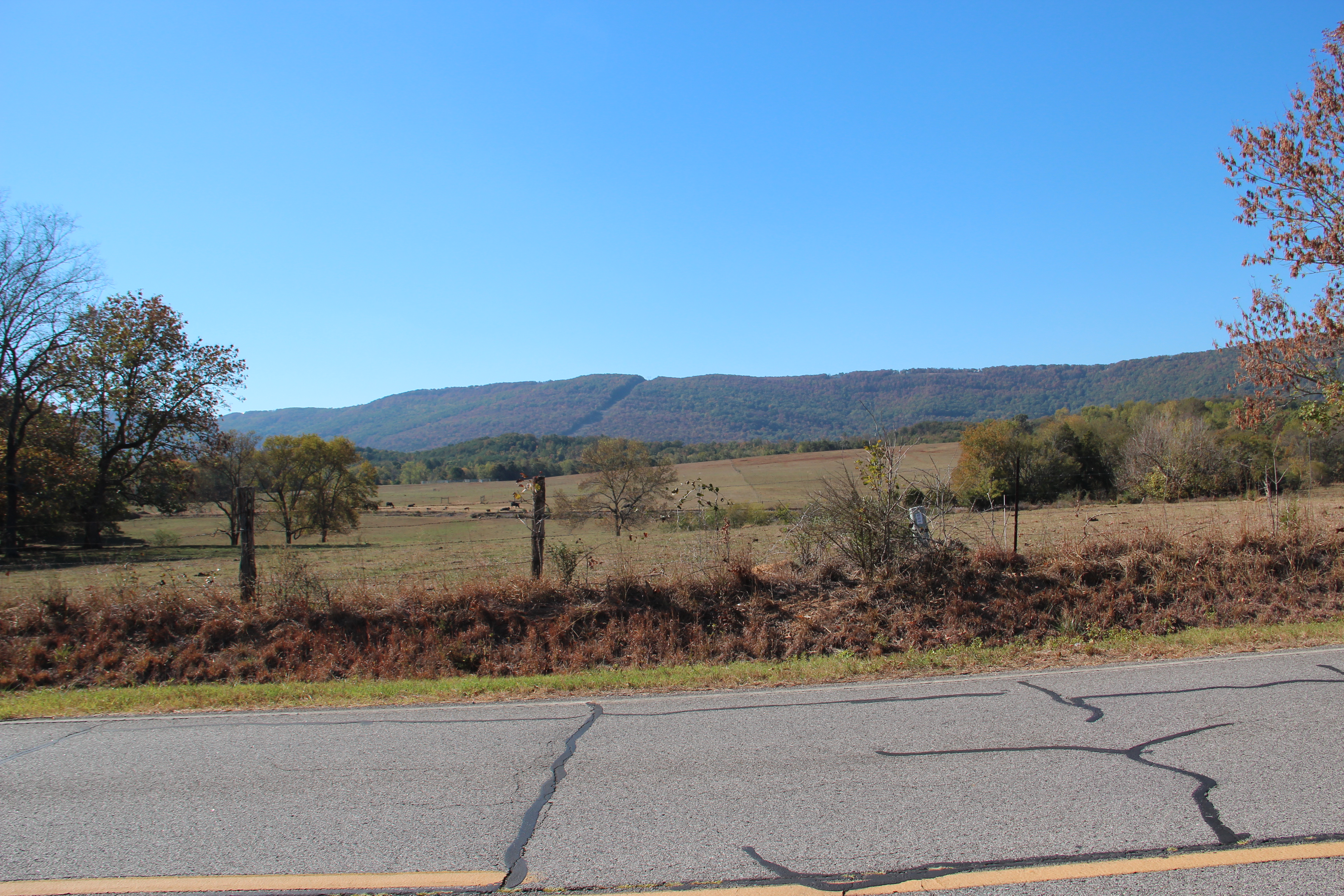
A field in McLemore Cove

McLemore Cove [elevation: 814 feet (248 m)] is a valley in Walker County, in the U.S. state of Georgia. The valley is located between Pigeon Mountain and Lookout Mountain.

McLemore Cove was named for John McLemore, chief of the Cherokee.
