= Naomi, Georgia =

Unincorporated community in Georgia, U.S.

Coordinates: 34°41′35″N 85°12′28″W

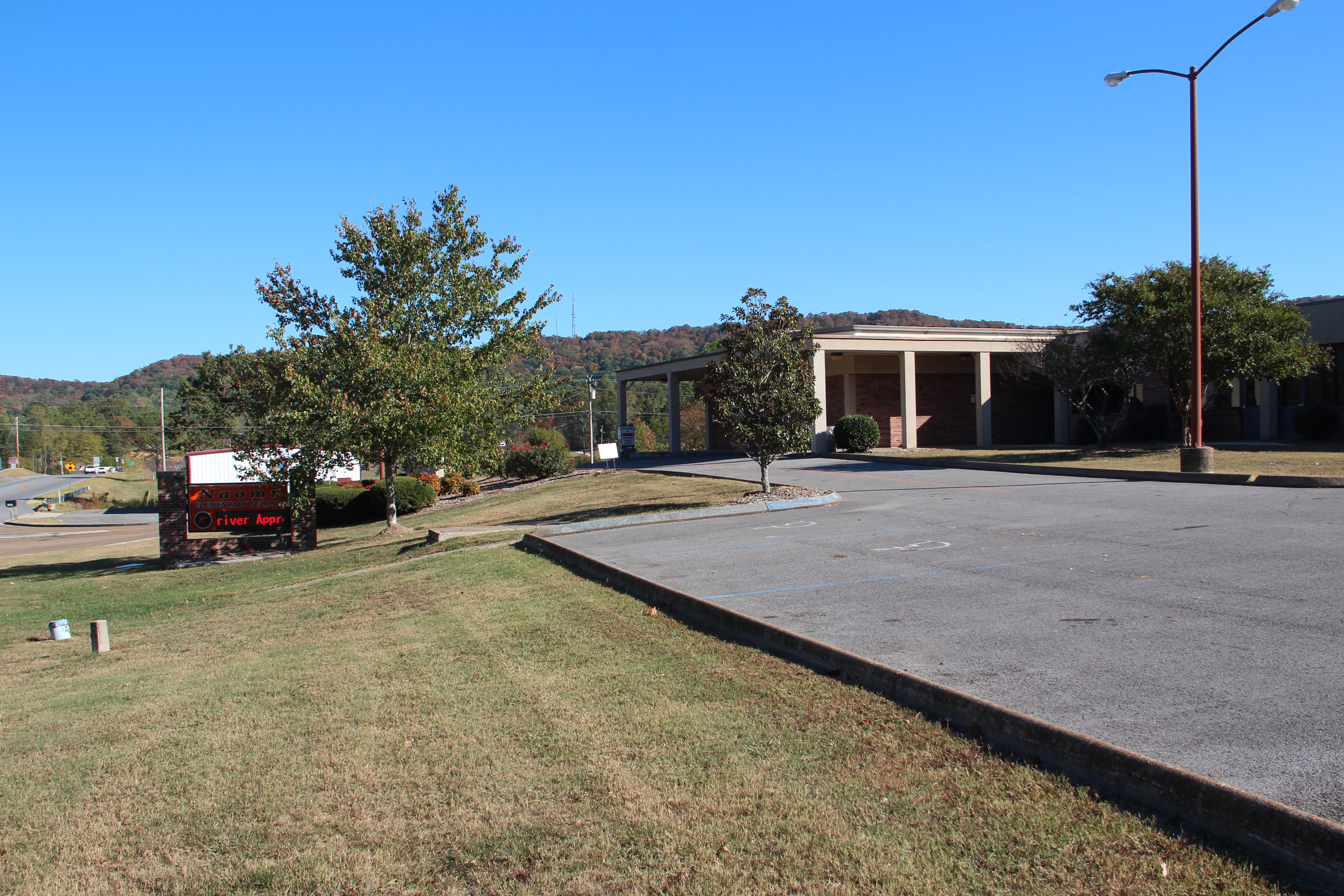
Naomi Elementary School

Naomi is an unincorporated community in Walker County, in the U.S. state of Georgia.

== History ==
A post office called Naomi was established in 1856, and remained in operation until it was discontinued in 1904. The community took its name after a local church which was named for the biblical Naomi.
