= Ellison's Cave =

Cave in Georgia (US)

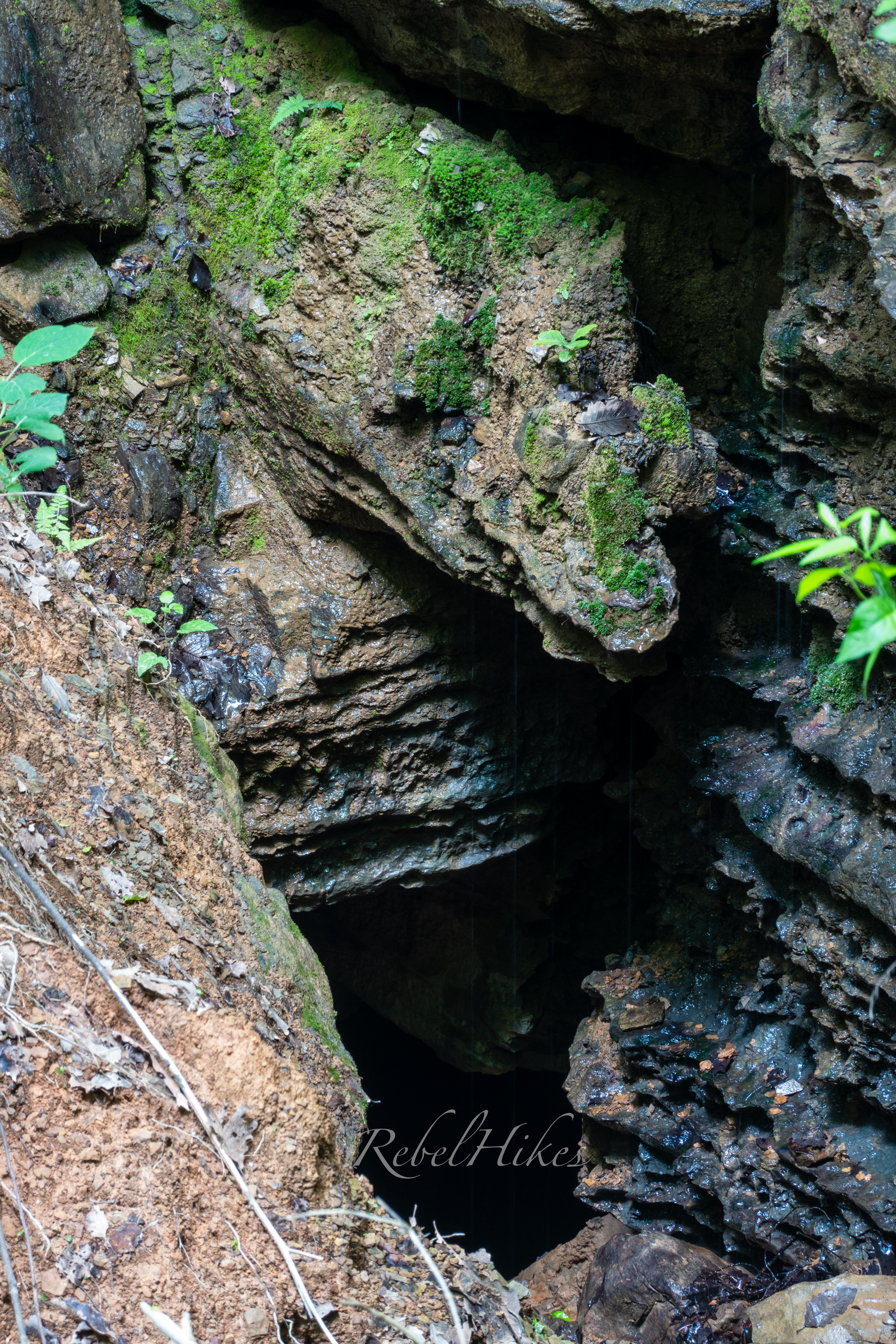
- Primary entrance to Ellison's Cave.
- Interactive map of Ellison's Cave
- Location: Walker County, Georgia
- Coordinates: USGS LaFayette, GA
- Depth: 1,063 feet (324 m)
- Length: 12.31 miles (19.81 km)
- Elevation: 1,666 feet (508 m) above sea level
- Geology: Mississippian Period carbonate formations (Bangor Limestone, Hartselle Formation, Monteagle Limestone)

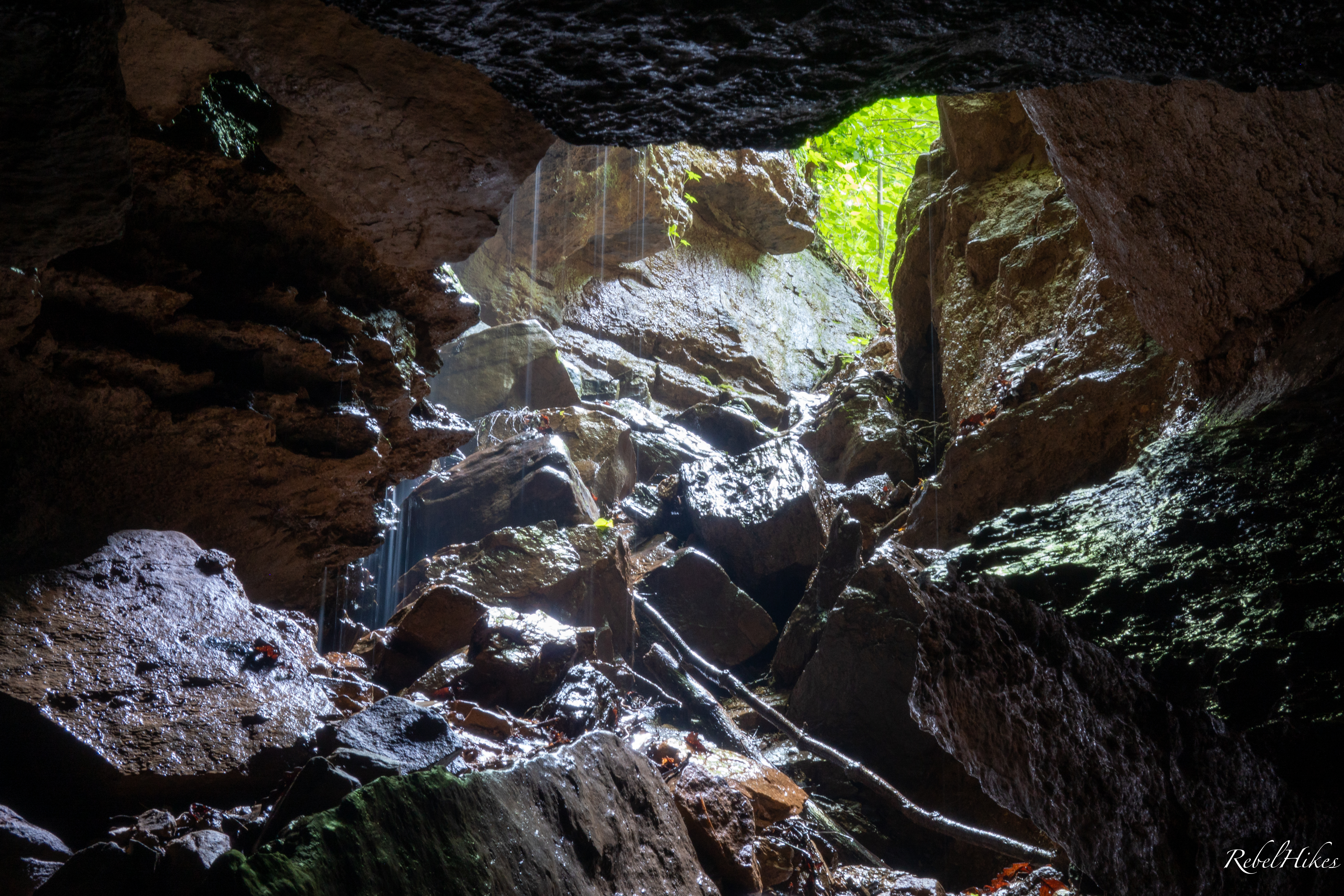
View out of the cave

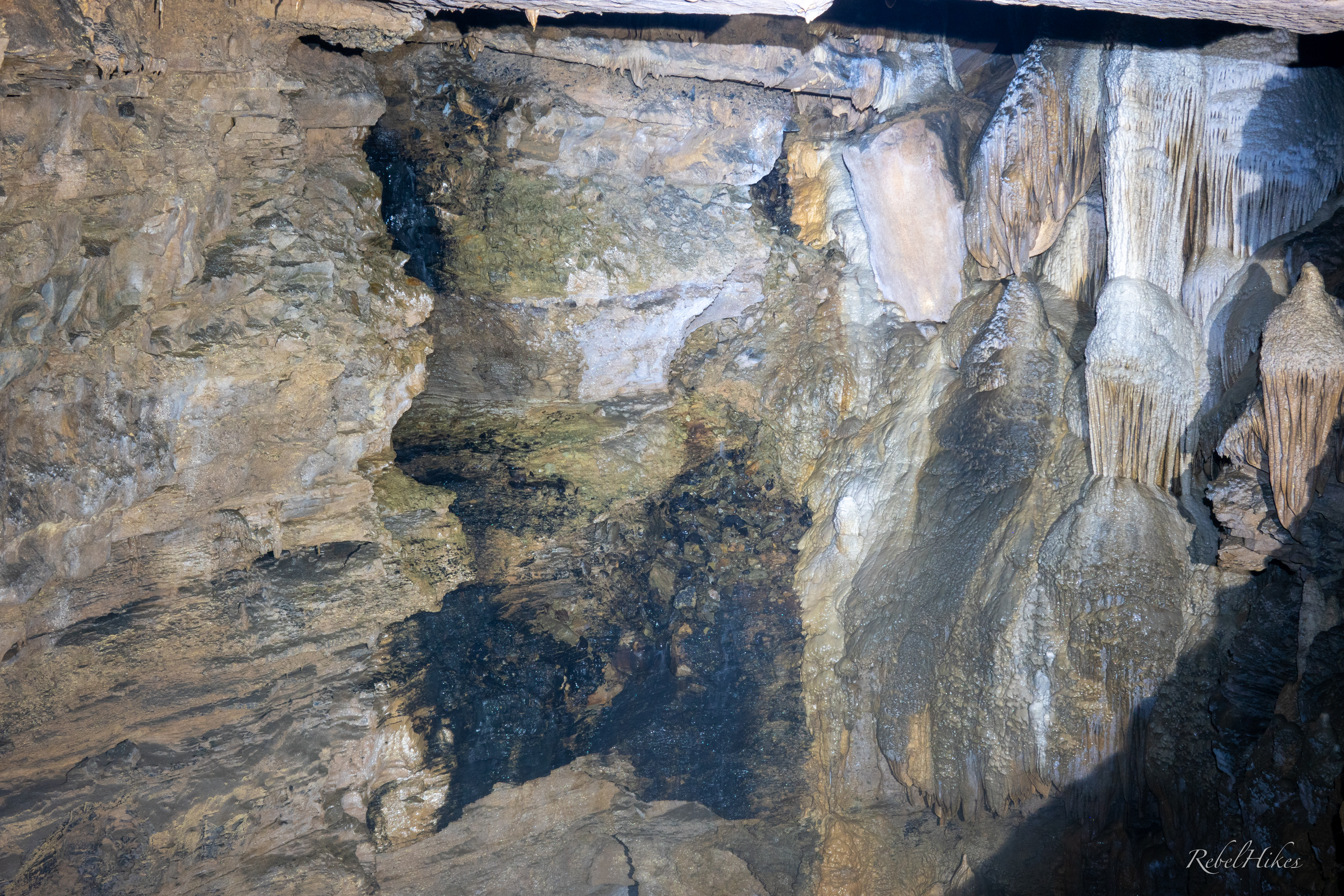

Ellison's Cave is an extensive cave system located in Walker County, on Pigeon Mountain in the Appalachian Plateaus of northwest Georgia. The cave is owned and managed by the Georgia Department of Natural Resources (GA DNR). It is the 19th deepest cave in the United States and features one of the deepest pits in the U.S., named Fantastic Pit (586 feet, 179 m). In total, the cave has over 12 miles (19 km) of known passage and a vertical extent of 1,063 feet (324 m) making it the 19th deepest cave in the United States. Water from the cave resurges from a natural spring at the foot of the mountain called the Blue Hole. The cave is well-known to cavers throughout the U.S. and it is frequently visited.

== Pits ==
Ellison's features many large pits, including two of the deepest pits in the contiguous United States: Fantastic (586 feet (179 m)) and Incredible (440 feet (130 m)). These two pits lie on opposite sides of the cave. Technically, the location named Fantastic is one of several rappel points into the massive TAG Hall canyon. Fantastic is the upstream end of TAG Hall and All-in-One (374 feet) is the furthest downstream. The Smokey I (500 feet) rig point is midway along the length of the canyon. Additional notable pits and domes elsewhere in the cave include New Pit (256 feet), Smokey II Pit (262 feet), Snowball Dome (265 feet), and Broken Dome (281 feet).

It is a common misconception that Ellison's has the deepest pits in the United States. However, Fantastic is the second deepest and Incredible is sixth deepest. On the global stage, no U.S. cave ranks in the top 50 for the deepest pits. Rather, that list is largely populated by caves in eastern Europe, China, Mexico, and Iran, and the deepest in the world being Vrtoglavica Cave in Slovenia.

== Geology ==
Ellison's is a solutional cave in the Ridge and Valley physiographic region of northwest Georgia and lies within a bedrock fault in Pigeon Mountain. During the Ordovician Period, tectonic subduction responsible for forming the Appalachians left a number of seismically active fault lines stretching from northern Alabama to eastern Tennessee. Continued orogeny created a large fault zone in the bedrock throughout the southern Appalachians and northern Georgia. This fracturing, along with the thick and uniform beds of limestone, contributes to the cave's notable depth.

== Incidents ==
- March 10, 1999 - A caver ascending the 440-ft tall Incredible Pit became tangled in a second parallel rope, which caused them to be stranded in the torrent of the waterfall some 140 feet above the cave floor. Unable to free himself and unable to adequately communicate for help, he eventually succumbed to hypothermia and harness-induced suspension trauma (commonly called "harness hang").
- February 12, 2011 - Two University of Florida students, who had no caving experience, died of hypothermia after becoming stranded on rope while hanging in the frigid waterfall of the 125-ft Warm-Up Pit. Post-accident evaluation determined the tragedy was completely avoidable and solely due to ill-preparation and lack of basic knowledge about the activity.
  The two individuals were visiting the cave with a group of eight others, who only planned to explore horizontal cave sections, from their University's church club. Between the two students intending to descend into the pit, there was only one harness and one set of ascenders which also lacked both the safety tethers and foot loops necessary for use. Each man rappelled using rock climbing belay devices that are not intended for caving ropework. One of the victims had neither a helmet, headlamp, or a flashlight of any kind, and the other victim had small handheld flashlight that he dropped.
  Overall, not only did they lack the bare minimum safety gear required to safely rappel and ascend the pit, but they also lacked the equipment necessary to assist in the event of an accident.
- May 26, 2013 - A caver was rescued and hospitalized after falling 40 feet while scrambling a large rock pile in the cave. It was reported in the American Caving Accidents publication that despite the complexity of the rescue, it took only 21 hours to evacuate the injured caver. During the rescue, a blood transfusion was performed by the attending medic while laying in the low crawlway stream that meanders through the lower cave. At the time, this was one of only a few known transfusions to have been performed in-cave. The man was hauled up Fantastic Pit and Warm-Up Pit by a large group of volunteer cave rescue personnel.
- March 26, 2016 - A 22-year-old man with improper ascending equipment was suffering from exhaustion and required rescuers to haul him up both Fantastic Pit and the Warm-Up Pit. Based on the post-accident reports, he and the group he was with lacked fundamental knowledge of adequate rope rigging which contributed to the situation. The man was otherwise unharmed, and once past the ropework, he was able to walk down the mountain without additional assistance.

== Visiting ==
The cave and surrounding area are managed by the Georgia Department of Natural Resources and the cave is open year-round except for special hunting weekends. Any person accessing DNR land must possess a land use permit or a sportsman's license (hunting, fishing, etc.) or they could be charged with trespassing.
