= Walker County, Georgia =

County in Georgia, United States

- County
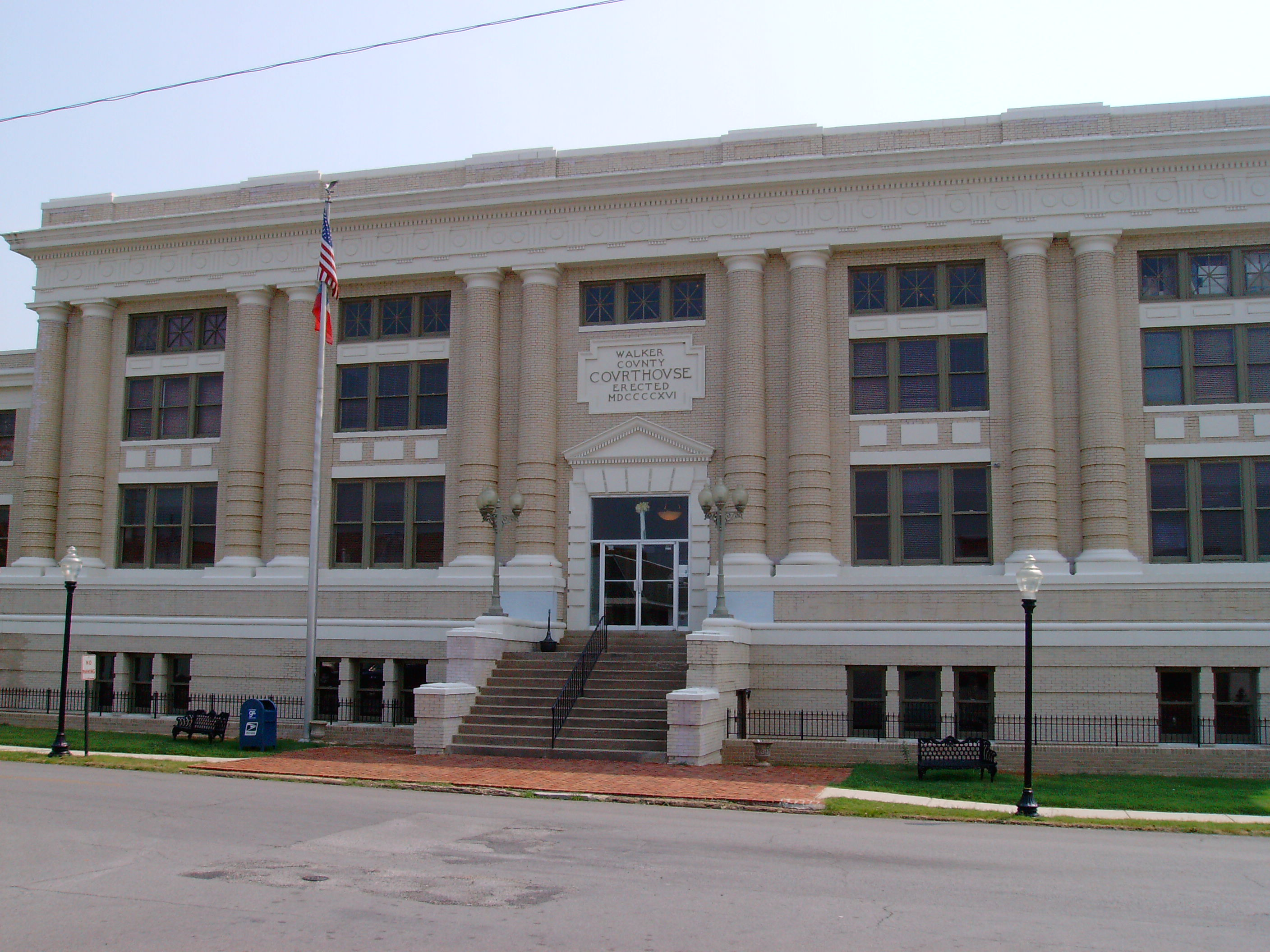
- Walker County Courthouse in LaFayette

- Seal

- Location within the U.S. state of Georgia
- Coordinates: 34°44′N 85°18′W
- Country: United States
- State: Georgia
- Founded: December 18, 1833; 192 years ago
- Named for: Freeman Walker
- Seat: LaFayette
- Largest city: LaFayette

Area
  - Total: 447 sq mi (1,160 km^{2})
  - Land: 446 sq mi (1,160 km^{2})
  - Water: 0.6 sq mi (1.6 km^{2}) 0.1%

Population (2020)
  - Total: 67,654
  - Estimate (2025): 70,250 ▲
  - Density: 152/sq mi (58.6/km^{2})
- Time zone: UTC−5 (Eastern)
  - Summer (DST): UTC−4 (EDT)
- Congressional district: 14th
- Website: walkercountyga.gov

Walker County is a county in the northwest region of the U.S. state of Georgia. As of the 2020 census, its population was 67,654, down from 68,756 in 2010. The county seat is LaFayette. The county was created on December 18, 1833, from land formerly belonging to the Cherokee Indian Nation. Walker County is part of the Chattanooga TN/GA metropolitan statistical area.

== History ==
Walker County was named after Georgia's U.S. Senator, Freeman Walker (1780–1827).

Civil War battles fought in Walker County were part of the Chickamauga Campaign fought between August 21 and September 20, 1863:

- Second Battle of Chattanooga, August 21
- Battle of Davis's Cross Roads, September 10–11
- Battle of Chickamauga, September 19–20

Another Civil War battle was fought during the Atlanta Campaign in 1864:

- Battle of LaFayette, June 24

In 2002, the Tri-State Crematory scandal in Noble came to national attention when 339 bodies that were consigned to be cremated were discovered on the property. The owner, Ray Brent Marsh, was convicted of several charges and sentenced to 12 years in prison.

== Geography ==
According to the U.S. Census Bureau, the county has a total area of 447 square miles (1,160 km^{2}), of which 0.6 sq mi (1.6 km^{2}) (0.1%) is covered by water. The northern two-thirds of Walker County is located in the Middle Tennessee-Chickamauga sub-basin of the Middle Tennessee-Hiwassee basin. Most of the southeastern portion of the county is located in the Oostanaula River sub-basin in the ACT River Basin (Coosa-Tallapoosa River Basin), with a very small southeastern sliver located in the Conasauga River sub-basin in the larger ACT River Basin. The rest of the southern portion of Walker County is located in the Upper Coosa River sub-basin in the ACT River Basin.

=== Adjacent counties ===
- Hamilton County, Tennessee - north
- Catoosa County - northeast
- Whitfield County - east
- Gordon County - southeast
- Floyd County - south
- Chattooga County - south
- DeKalb County, Alabama - southwest/CST Border
- Dade County - west

=== Natural attractions and features ===
- Chattahoochee National Forest (part)
- Chickamauga and Chattanooga National Military Park (part)
- Ellison's Cave (12th deepest cave in the United States)
- Lookout Mountain (part)
- McLemore Cove
- Petty John's Cave
- Pigeon Mountain
- Rocktown
- Rock City
- Lula Lake Land Trust

== Government ==
Until 2020, Walker County was one of only nine counties in the United States still employing the sole commissioner form of government. Georgia is the last remaining state that allows sole commissioners. In a 2018 referendum, Walker County voters approved with an 80% margin a transition to a five-member board of commissioners, consisting of four commissioners elected by district and a chairperson. The first members of the board were elected in November 2020 and took office in January 2021 with Districts 1 and 2 commissioners serving an initial two-year term and Districts 3 and 4 commissioners and the chairperson serving an initial four-year term. From 2022, every commissioner will serve four-year terms, therefore ensuring that half the commission is up for reelection every two years. The commission meets in LaFayette, the county seat.

The commissioners of each district represent these areas:

- District 1: Rossville
- District 2: Chickamauga
- District 3: LaFayette
- District 4: Lookout Mountain

== Transportation ==
=== Major highways ===
- U.S. Route 27 / State Route 1
  - U.S. Route 27 Business / State Route 1 Business
- State Route 2
- State Route 95
- State Route 136
- State Route 151
- State Route 157
- State Route 189
- State Route 193
- State Route 201
- State Route 337
- State Route 341

=== Railroads ===
==== Current ====
- Chattooga and Chickamauga Railway
- Tennessee Valley Railroad Museum (occasional tourist excursions)

==== Defunct ====
- Chattanooga Southern Railway (became Tennessee, Alabama and Georgia Railway)
- Tennessee, Alabama and Georgia Railway (merged into Southern Railway, then abandoned )
- Chickamauga and Durham Railroad (merged into Chattanooga & Durham)
- Chattanooga and Durham Railroad (merged by Chattanooga, Rome and Southern)
- Chattanooga, Rome and Southern Railroad (merged into Central of GA Railway)
- Central of Georgia Railway (merged into Southern Railway)
- Southern Railway (merged into Norfolk Southern, Walker County line transferred to State of Georgia, leased to Chattooga and Chickamauga Railway)

== Demographics ==
Historical population
Census	Pop.	Note	%±
1840	6,572		—
1850	13,109		99.5%
1860	10,082		−23.1%
1870	9,925		−1.6%
1880	11,056		11.4%
1890	13,282		20.1%
1900	15,661		17.9%
1910	18,692		19.4%
1920	23,370		25.0%
1930	26,206		12.1%
1940	31,024		18.4%
1950	38,198		23.1%
1960	45,264		18.5%
1970	50,691		12.0%
1980	56,470		11.4%
1990	58,340		3.3%
2000	61,053		4.7%
2010	68,756		12.6%
2020	67,654		−1.6%
2025 (est.)	70,250	▲	3.8%
U.S. Decennial Census; 1790-1880 1890-1910; 1920-1930 1930-1940; 1940-1950 1960-1980; 1980-2000 2010 2020

=== Racial and ethnic composition ===
Walker County, Georgia – Racial and ethnic composition Note: the US Census treats Hispanic/Latino as an ethnic category. This table excludes Latinos from the racial categories and assigns them to a separate category. Hispanics/Latinos may be of any race.
Race / Ethnicity (NH = Non-Hispanic)	Pop 1980	Pop 1990	Pop 2000	Pop 2010	Pop 2020	% 1980	% 1990	% 2000	% 2010	% 2020
White alone (NH)	53,792	55,624	57,336	63,343	59,654	95.26%	95.34%	93.91%	92.13%	88.18%
Black or African American alone (NH)	2,307	2,241	2,300	2,809	2,840	4.09%	3.84%	3.77%	4.09%	4.20%
Native American or Alaska Native alone (NH)	53	132	172	170	149	0.09%	0.23%	0.28%	0.25%	0.22%
Asian alone (NH)	59	124	165	291	293	0.10%	0.21%	0.27%	0.42%	0.43%
Native Hawaiian or Pacific Islander alone (NH)	x	x	13	30	25	x	x	0.02%	0.04%	0.04%
Other race alone (NH)	10	5	48	53	204	0.02%	0.01%	0.08%	0.08%	0.30%
Mixed race or Multiracial (NH)	x	x	454	947	2,804	x	x	0.74%	1.38%	4.14%
Hispanic or Latino (any race)	249	214	565	1,113	1,685	0.44%	0.37%	0.93%	1.62%	2.49%
Total	56,470	58,340	61,053	68,756	67,654	100.00%	100.00%	100.00%	100.00%	100.00%

=== 2020 census ===
As of the 2020 census, the county had a population of 67,654, 26,206 households, and 17,810 families residing in the county. The median age was 41.6 years, 22.0% of residents were under the age of 18, and 18.4% were 65 years of age or older. For every 100 females there were 97.9 males, and for every 100 females age 18 and over there were 95.7 males age 18 and over.

The racial makeup of the county was 88.9% White, 4.2% Black or African American, 0.3% American Indian and Alaska Native, 0.4% Asian, 0.1% Native Hawaiian and Pacific Islander, 1.1% from some other race, and 5.0% from two or more races. Hispanic or Latino residents of any race comprised 2.5% of the population.

49.0% of residents lived in urban areas, while 51.0% lived in rural areas.

There were 26,206 households in the county, of which 30.1% had children under the age of 18 living with them and 26.4% had a female householder with no spouse or partner present. About 25.7% of all households were made up of individuals and 12.1% had someone living alone who was 65 years of age or older.

There were 29,137 housing units, of which 10.1% were vacant. Among occupied housing units, 71.8% were owner-occupied and 28.2% were renter-occupied. The homeowner vacancy rate was 1.5% and the rental vacancy rate was 8.1%.

=== 2010 census ===
As of the 2010 United States census, 68,756 people, 26,497 households, and 18,898 families were living in the county. The population density was 154.0 inhabitants per square mile (59.5/km^{2}). The 30,100 housing units had an average density of 67.4/sq mi (26.0/km^{2}). The racial makeup of the county was 93.0% White, 4.1% African American, 0.4% Asian, 0.3% American Indian, 0.6% from other races, and 1.6% from two or more races. Those of Hispanic or Latino origin made up 1.6% of the population. In terms of ancestry, 25.9% were American, 15.3% were Irish, 11.2% were English, and 9.3% were German.

Of the 26,497 households, 33.8% had children under 18 living with them, 53.1% were married couples living together, 13.1% had a female householder with no husband present, and 28.7% were not families; 24.7% of all households were made up of individuals. The average household size was 2.54 and the average family size was 3.01. The median age was 39.7 years.

The county's age distribution was 23.6% under 18, 5.3% from 20 to 24, 25.8% from 25 to 44, 27.8% from 45 to 64, and 15% who were 65 or older. The gender ratio of the county's population was 50.9% female versus 49.1% male.

The median income for a household in the county was $38,723, and for a family was $46,307. Males had a median income of $38,297 versus $29,285 for females. The per capita income for the county was $19,440. About 11.6% of families and 15.1% of the population were below the poverty line, including 20.0% of those under 18 and 8.1% of those 65 or over.

=== 2000 census ===
As of the 2000 census, 61,053 people, 23,605 households, and 17,467 families were living in the county. The population density was 137 inhabitants per square mile (53/km^{2}). There were 25,577 housing units at an average density of 57 per square mile (22/km^{2}). The racial makeup of the county was 94.43% White, 3.78% African American, 0.29% Native American, 0.28% Asian, 0.02% Pacific Islander, 0.36% from other races, and 0.84% from two or more races. About 0.93% of the population were Hispanics or Latinos of any race.

Of the 23,605 households, 32.6% had children under 18 living with them, 57.8% were married couples living together, 12.0% had a female householder with no husband present, and 26.0% were not families. About 22.9% of all households were made up of individuals, and 10.4% had someone living alone who was 65 or older. The average household size was 2.54 and the average family size was 2.98. The median age was 37 years.

The county's age distribution was 24.8% under 18, 8.70% from 18 to 24, 28.80% from 25 to 44, 23.90% from 45 to 64, and 13.80% who were 65 or older. For every 100 females, there were 94.4 males. For every 100 females age 18 and over, there were 90.9 males.

The median income for a household in the county was $32,406, and for a family was $39,034. Males had a median income of $29,448 versus $21,583 for females. The per capita income for the county was $15,867. About 10.00% of families and 12.50% of the population were below the poverty line, including 17.10% of those under age 18 and 11.70% of those age 65 or over.

== Communities ==
=== Cities ===
- Chickamauga
- Fort Oglethorpe (small portion only)
- LaFayette (county seat)
- Lookout Mountain
- Rossville

=== Census-designated places ===
- Chattanooga Valley
- Fairview
- Lakeview
- Rock Spring

=== Unincorporated communities ===
- Durham
- Flintstone
- High Point
- Hinkles
- Kensington
- Naomi
- Villanow
- East Armuchee
- Noble

== Media ==
- Walker County Messenger

== Education ==
Walker County School District includes most areas, while areas in the Chickamauga city limits are in the Chickamauga City School District.

== Politics ==
As of the 2020s, Walker County is a strongly Republican voting county, voting 79% for Donald Trump in 2024. For elections to the United States House of Representatives, Walker County is part of Georgia's 14th congressional district, currently represented by Clay Fuller. For elections to the Georgia State Senate, Walker County is part of District 53. For elections to the Georgia House of Representatives, Walker County is divided by District 1 and District 2.

United States presidential election results for Walker County, Georgia
Year	Republican		Democratic		Third party(ies)	
Year	No.	%	No.	%	No.	%
1912	215	15.47%	771	55.47%	404	29.06%
1916	300	11.44%	1,883	71.82%	439	16.74%
1920	1,069	44.25%	1,347	55.75%	0	0.00%
1924	878	32.86%	1,740	65.12%	54	2.02%
1928	1,786	62.91%	1,053	37.09%	0	0.00%
1932	405	15.05%	2,255	83.80%	31	1.15%
1936	458	16.50%	2,313	83.32%	5	0.18%
1940	558	16.30%	2,859	83.50%	7	0.20%
1944	765	21.74%	2,753	78.23%	1	0.03%
1948	980	20.02%	3,418	69.83%	497	10.15%
1952	2,866	39.63%	4,366	60.37%	0	0.00%
1956	3,552	49.03%	3,693	50.97%	0	0.00%
1960	4,027	46.86%	4,566	53.14%	0	0.00%
1964	5,939	52.09%	5,454	47.84%	8	0.07%
1968	3,664	25.59%	1,930	13.48%	8,725	60.93%
1972	8,728	84.72%	1,574	15.28%	0	0.00%
1976	4,807	37.51%	8,007	62.49%	0	0.00%
1980	7,088	50.16%	6,809	48.18%	235	1.66%
1984	10,734	68.22%	5,000	31.78%	0	0.00%
1988	10,487	68.63%	4,753	31.11%	40	0.26%
1992	8,489	48.54%	6,217	35.55%	2,782	15.91%
1996	8,817	50.10%	6,743	38.32%	2,038	11.58%
2000	12,326	65.23%	6,341	33.56%	228	1.21%
2004	15,340	71.34%	5,986	27.84%	176	0.82%
2008	17,110	72.33%	6,095	25.77%	449	1.90%
2012	16,247	73.86%	5,274	23.98%	475	2.16%
2016	18,950	77.73%	4,215	17.29%	1,214	4.98%
2020	23,173	78.89%	5,770	19.64%	431	1.47%
2024	25,462	79.36%	6,436	20.06%	188	0.59%

United States Senate election results for Walker County, Georgia2
Year	Republican		Democratic		Third party(ies)	
Year	No.	%	No.	%	No.	%
2020	22,650	78.05%	5,435	18.73%	934	3.22%
2020	19,268	79.75%	4,891	20.25%	0	0.00%

United States Senate election results for Walker County, Georgia3
Year	Republican		Democratic		Third party(ies)	
Year	No.	%	No.	%	No.	%
2020	12,258	43.00%	2,113	7.41%	14,135	49.59%
2020	23,174	80.07%	5,769	19.93%	0	0.00%
2022	17,064	77.66%	4,377	19.92%	531	2.42%
2022	15,517	79.89%	3,905	20.11%	0	0.00%

Georgia Gubernatorial election results for Walker County
Year	Republican		Democratic		Third party(ies)	
Year	No.	%	No.	%	No.	%
2022	18,414	83.26%	3,505	15.85%	198	0.90%

== See also ==
- National Register of Historic Places listings in Walker County, Georgia
- Northwest Georgia Joint Development Authority
- List of counties in Georgia
