= Rocktown (Georgia) =

Rock-climbing area in Georgia, United States

Coordinates: 34°39′32″N 85°23′23″W

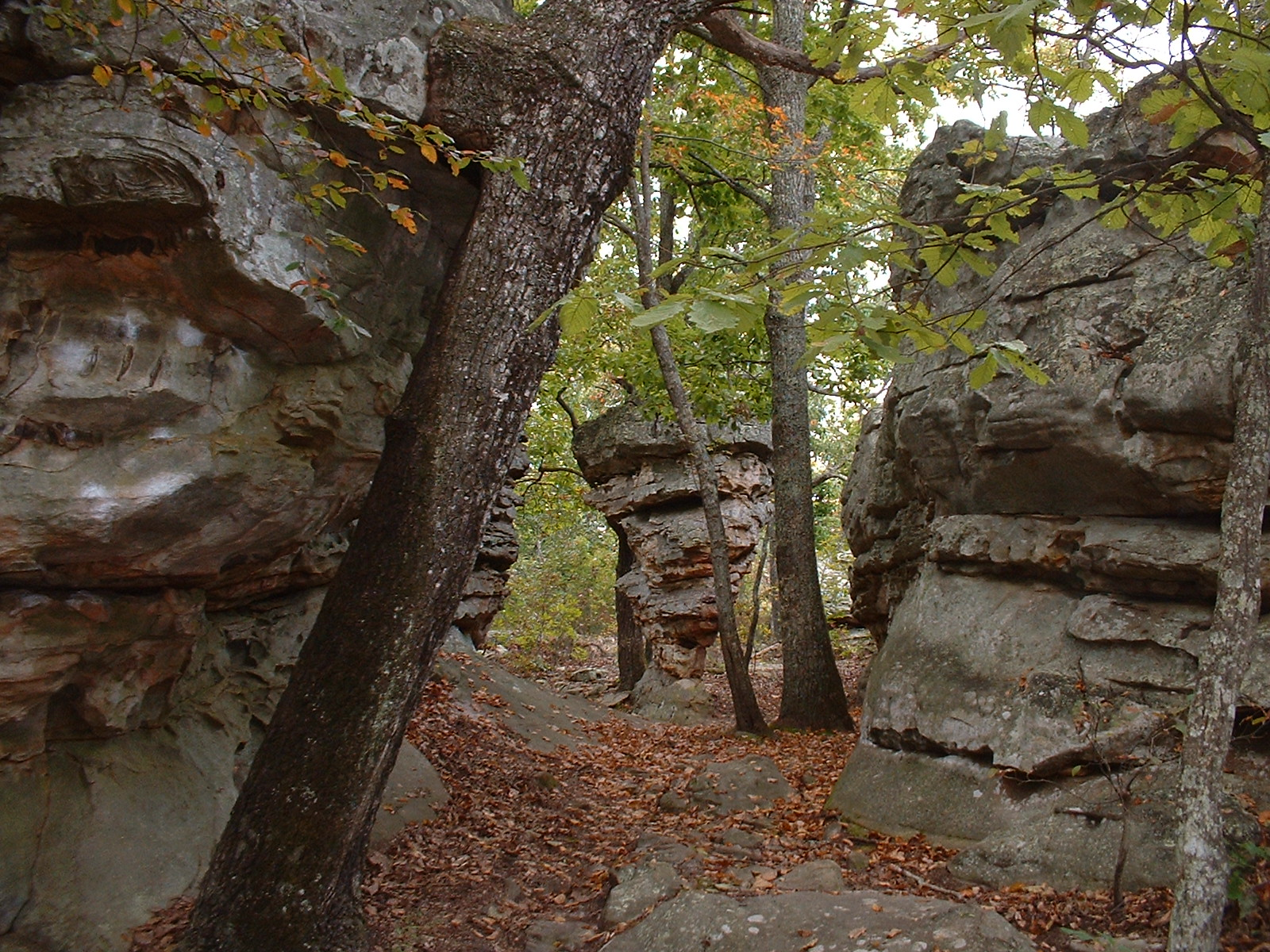
These formations are typical of those found in and around the Rocktown area

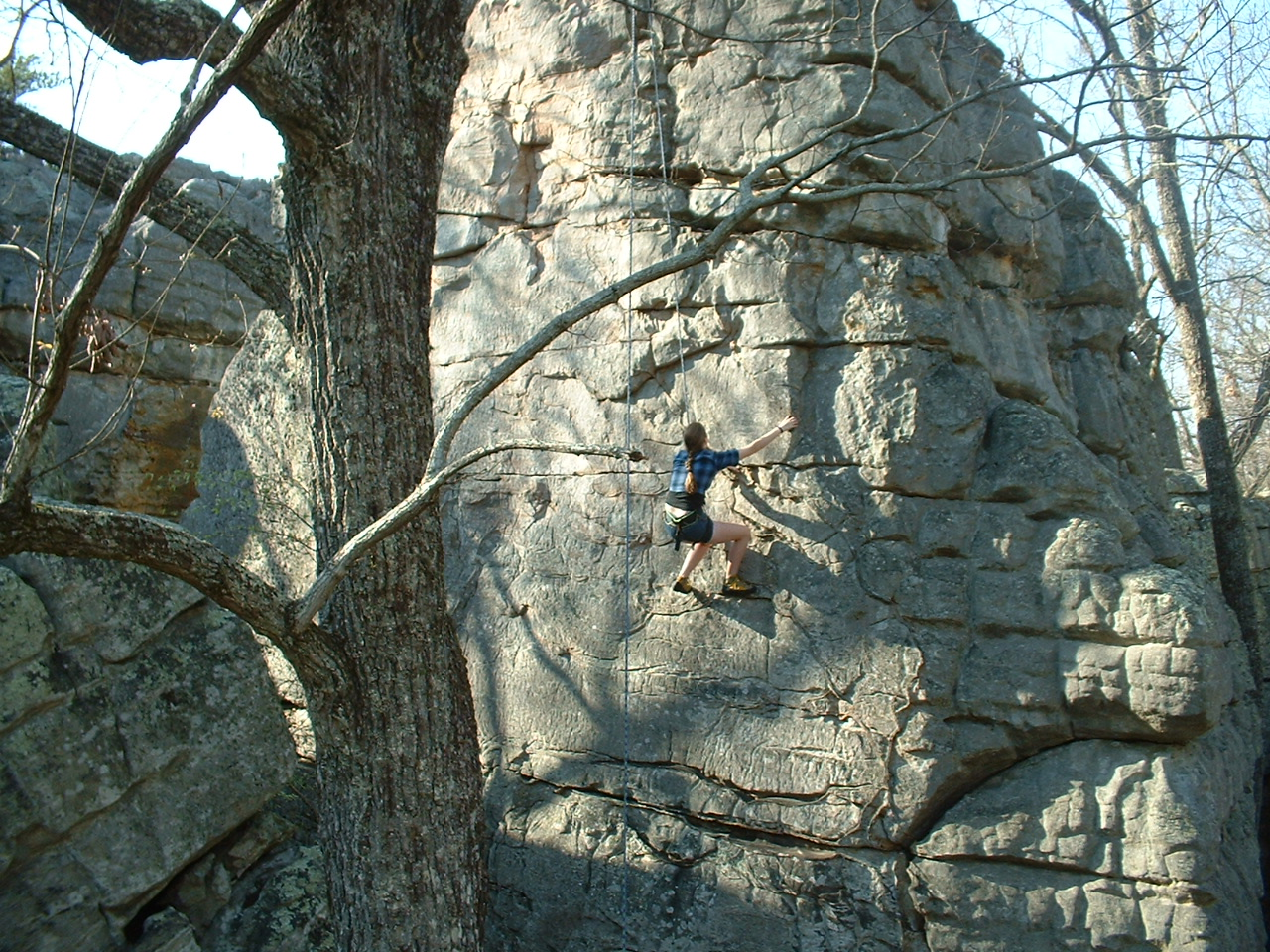
A young climber uses a top-rope safety rig at Rocktown

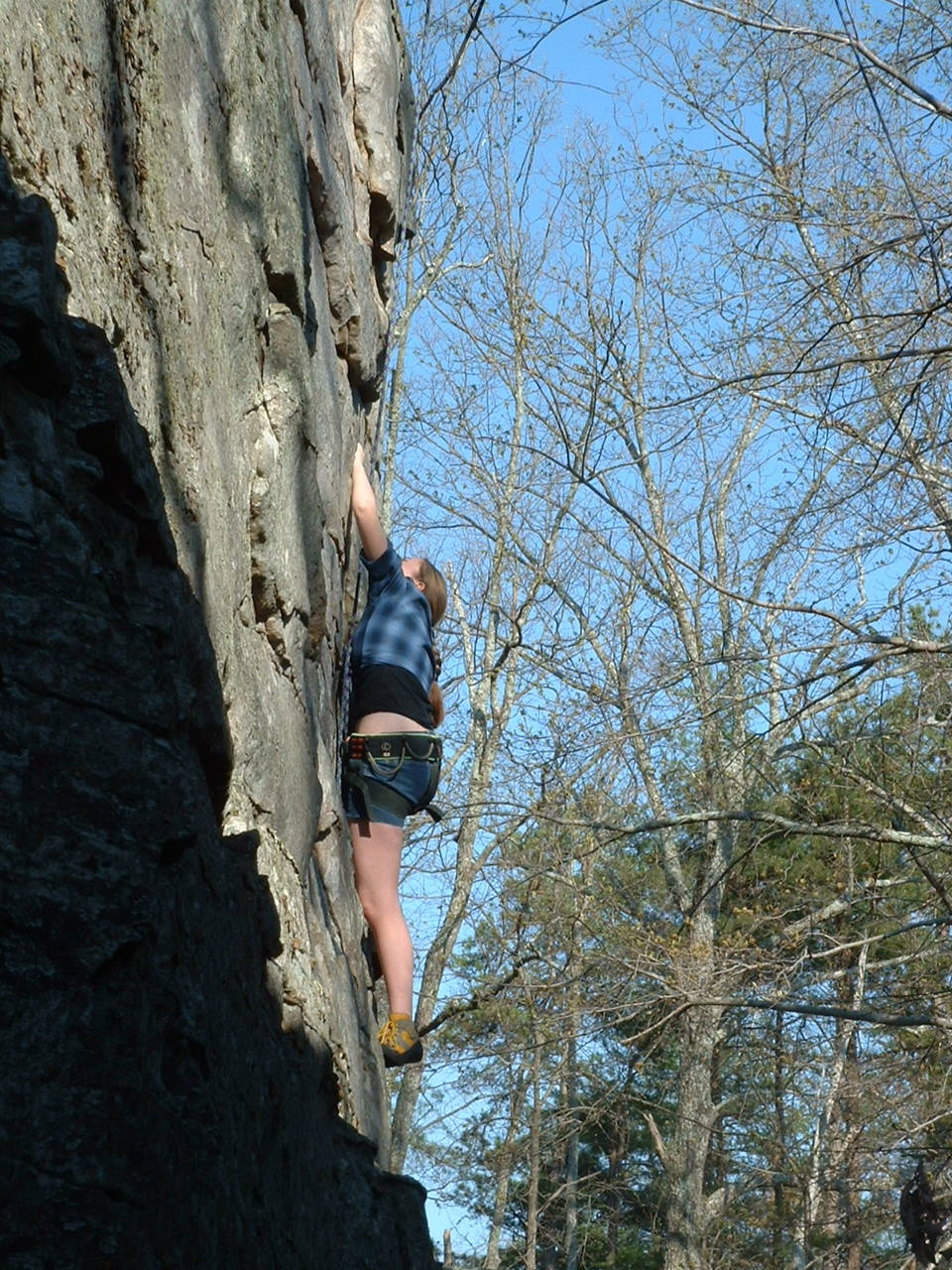
Ascending an unnamed wall at Rocktown, Georgia

Rocktown, Georgia is the colloquial name for an outcropping of sandstone boulders on the Appalachian Plateau in northwest Georgia. It consists of several acres of large sandstone boulders; the average size is 30 to 40 feet (9.1 to 12.2 m) high. Every boulder has its unique features, all with great foot and hand holds, and are very popular with climbers. The area presents challenges for all levels of climbers. There is a one-mile hike from the trailhead to get to the Rocktown area. Most of these boulders are untainted by pollution and graffiti because it is in a remote part of northwest Georgia. However, in recent years as the climbing community has become increasingly aware of the area it has become more common to see trash, human waste, damaged or abandoned climbing gear, and vandalism. Because it is located in a wildlife management area, it is possible to encounter wild animals in this area, including both venomous and non-venomous snakes, bobcats, deer, wild turkeys, and black bears. When climbing and exploring the boulders, caves, and grottoes, it is common to encounter wasps, yellow-jackets spiders, and even the occasional bat. "Rock Town" refers to the large outcropping approximately one(1) mile from the trailhead. Which opens into a large gallery with 5 main pathways. This area has hundreds of spectacular formations, the entrance to a large cave, and 2 natural springs.

The Rocktown trail and area are closed annually during scheduled deer hunts.

== Location ==
Once a preciously guarded secret among locals and a small collection of climbing enthusiasts, Rocktown trail is located on top of Pigeon Mountain in extreme Northwest Georgia. It is part of the Crockford Pigeon Mountain Wildlife Management Area and is administered by the Department of Natural Resources, Wildlife Resources Division of the State of Georgia. It is northwest of Atlanta Georgia, and just south of Chattanooga, Tennessee. The town closest to the trail is LaFayette, Georgia. To access Crockford Pigeon Mountain WMA, one must possess a hunting or fishing license or a Georgia Lands Pass.

== Activities ==
Although rock climbing is the most popular activity in Rocktown, other activities include hunting, hiking, bird watching and picnicking. Camping is prohibited at Rocktown but is permitted in designated areas on certain portions of the wildlife management area.
