= Chattanooga Valley, Georgia =

- Unincorporated community Census-designated place
- Location in Walker County and the state of Georgia
- Coordinates: 34°55′20″N 85°20′8″W
- Country: United States
- State: Georgia
- County: Walker

Area
  - Total: 7.42 sq mi (19.22 km^{2})
  - Land: 7.42 sq mi (19.22 km^{2})
  - Water: 0 sq mi (0.00 km^{2})
- Elevation: 715 ft (218 m)

Population (2020)
  - Total: 3,962
  - Density: 534.0/sq mi (206.17/km^{2})
- Time zone: UTC-5 (Eastern (EST))
  - Summer (DST): UTC-4 (EDT)
- Area codes: 706/762
- FIPS code: 13-15585
- GNIS feature ID: 2402766

Chattanooga Valley is an unincorporated community and census-designated place (CDP) in Walker County, Georgia, United States. The population was 3,962 at the 2020 census. It is part of the Chattanooga, TN–GA Metropolitan Statistical Area.

Chattanooga is a Muskogean-language name meaning "rock coming to a point".

== Geography ==
Chattanooga Valley is located at 34°55′20″N 85°20′8″W (34.922236, -85.335453).

According to the United States Census Bureau, the CDP has a total area of 7.5 square miles (19 km^{2}), all land.

== Demographics ==
Historical population
Census	Pop.	Note	%±
1990	4,088		—
2000	4,065		−0.6%
2010	3,846		−5.4%
2020	3,962		3.0%
U.S. Decennial Census; 1850-1870 1870-1880; 1890-1910 1920-1930; 1940 1950 1960; 1970 1980 1990; 2000 2010 2020

Chattanooga Valley first appeared as a census designated place in the 1990 U.S. census.

=== Racial and ethnic composition ===
Chattanooga Valley, Georgia – Racial and ethnic composition Note: the U.S. census treats Hispanic/Latino as an ethnic category. This table excludes Latinos from the racial categories and assigns them to a separate category. Hispanics/Latinos may be of any race.
Race / Ethnicity (NH = Non-Hispanic)	Pop 2000	Pop 2010	Pop 2020	% 2000	% 2010	% 2020
White alone (NH)	3,978	3,678	3,563	97.86%	95.63%	89.93%
Black or African American alone (NH)	21	36	77	0.52%	0.94%	1.94%
Native American or Alaska Native alone (NH)	12	18	6	0.30%	0.47%	0.15%
Asian alone (NH)	9	11	7	0.22%	0.29%	0.18%
Pacific Islander alone (NH)	0	1	2	0.00%	0.03%	0.05%
Some Other Race alone (NH)	0	0	6	0.00%	0.00%	0.15%
Mixed race or Multiracial (NH)	17	39	199	0.42%	1.01%	5.02%
Hispanic or Latino (any race)	28	63	102	0.69%	1.64%	2.57%
Total	4,065	3,846	3,962	100.00%	100.00%	100.00%

=== 2020 census ===
As of the 2020 census, Chattanooga Valley had a population of 3,962. The median age was 42.1 years. 22.2% of residents were under the age of 18 and 19.2% of residents were 65 years of age or older. For every 100 females there were 92.9 males, and for every 100 females age 18 and over there were 91.1 males age 18 and over.

56.0% of residents lived in urban areas, while 44.0% lived in rural areas.

There were 1,560 households in Chattanooga Valley, of which 28.4% had children under the age of 18 living in them. Of all households, 48.4% were married-couple households, 16.3% were households with a male householder and no spouse or partner present, and 27.1% were households with a female householder and no spouse or partner present. About 25.3% of all households were made up of individuals and 12.6% had someone living alone who was 65 years of age or older.

There were 1,709 housing units, of which 8.7% were vacant. The homeowner vacancy rate was 1.0% and the rental vacancy rate was 6.6%.

=== 2000 census ===
As of the census of 2000, there were 4,065 people, 1,588 households, and 1,225 families residing in the CDP. The population density was 539.3 inhabitants per square mile (208.2/km^{2}). There were 1,698 housing units at an average density of 225.3 per square mile (87.0/km^{2}). The racial makeup of the CDP was 98.18% White, 0.54% African American, 0.30% Native American, 0.22% Asian, 0.32% from other races, and 0.44% from two or more races. Hispanic or Latino of any race were 0.69% of the population.

There were 1,588 households, out of which 31.4% had children under the age of 18 living with them, 63.6% were married couples living together, 10.1% had a female householder with no husband present, and 22.8% were non-families. 20.4% of all households were made up of individuals, and 9.3% had someone living alone who was 65 years of age or older. The average household size was 2.56 and the average family size was 2.93.

In the CDP, the population was spread out, with 23.7% under the age of 18, 7.7% from 18 to 24, 29.2% from 25 to 44, 25.0% from 45 to 64, and 14.5% who were 65 years of age or older. The median age was 38 years. For every 100 females, there were 95.0 males. For every 100 females age 18 and over, there were 91.1 males.

The median income for a household in the CDP was $34,950, and the median income for a family was $40,720. Males had a median income of $32,250 versus $22,083 for females. The per capita income for the CDP was $17,415. About 6.9% of families and 9.5% of the population were below the poverty line, including 16.3% of those under age 18 and 6.9% of those age 65 or over.
