= Gordon County School District =

School district in Georgia (U.S. state)

Gordon County School System

Address
- 7300 Fairmount HWY SE Calhoun, Georgia, 30701-9266; United States
- Coordinates: 34.546439°N 84.901314°W

District information
- Grades: Pre-school – 12
- Superintendent: Alice Mashburn
- Accreditation(s): COGNIA; Georgia Accrediting Commission

Students and staff
- Enrollment: 6,259
- Faculty: 365

Other information
- Telephone: (706) 629-7366
- Fax: (706) 625-5671
- Website: www.gcbe.org

The Gordon County School District is a public school district in Gordon County, Georgia, United States, based in Calhoun. It serves the communities of Calhoun, Cash, Damascus, Fairmount, New Town, Plainville, Ranger, Red Bud, Resaca, Sonoraville, and Sugar Valley.

== Schools ==
The Gordon County School District has six elementary schools, two middle schools, and two high schools.

=== Elementary schools ===
- Belwood Elementary School
- Fairmount Elementary School
- Red Bud Elementary School
- Sonoraville Elementary School
- W. L. Swain Elementary School
- Max V. Tolbert Elementary School

=== Middle schools ===
- Ashworth Middle School
- Red Bud Middle School

=== High schools ===
- Gordon Central High School
- Sonoraville High School

=== Closed schools ===
- Sonoraville middle school
