= Tornado outbreak of April 8, 1957 =

Natural disaster in the southeastern United States

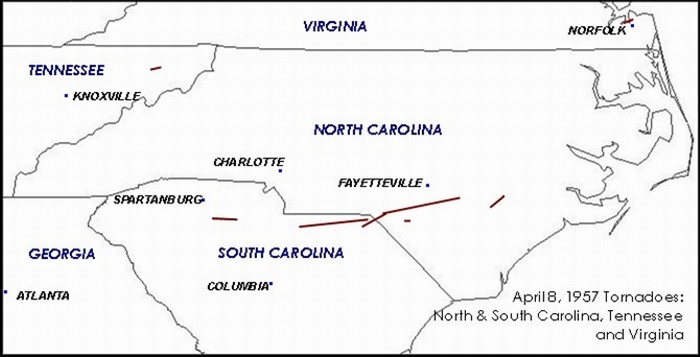
- Map of tornadoes

Tornado outbreak
- Tornadoes: 18
- Max. rating: F4 tornado
- Duration: April 8, 1957
- Highest winds: 65 kn (75 mph; 120 km/h)
- Largest hail: 4 in (10 cm)

Overall effects
- Fatalities: 7
- Injuries: 203
- Damage: ≥ $4.108 million ($47,090,000 in 2025 USD) (Note: All losses are in 1957 USD unless otherwise noted.)
- Areas affected: Southeastern United States
- Part of the tornadoes and tornado outbreaks of 1957

On Monday, April 8, 1957, a widespread tornado outbreak struck the Southeastern United States, particularly the Carolinas, and was responsible for seven deaths and 203 injuries across the region. Most of the activity occurred on either side of the Piedmont, including portions of the Cumberland Plateau. At least 18 tornadoes occurred, including several long-tracked tornado families, one of which included a violent tornado that was retroactively rated F4 on the Fujita scale; activity lasted 21 1/12 hours. Besides tornadoes, the outbreak also generated other severe weather phenomena such as large hail. (Note: An outbreak is generally defined as a group of at least six tornadoes (the number sometimes varies slightly according to local climatology) with no more than a six-hour gap between individual tornadoes. An outbreak sequence, prior to (after) the start of modern records in 1950, is defined as a period of no more than two (one) consecutive days without at least one significant (F2 or stronger) tornado.)

== Outbreak statistics ==
Impacts by region
Region	Locale	Deaths	Injuries	Damages	Source
United States	Alabama	2	95	$525,500	
United States	Arkansas	0	0	$2,500	
United States	Georgia	1	26	$550,000	
United States	Mississippi	0	0	≥ $25,000	
United States	North Carolina	4	64	$1,500,000	
United States	South Carolina	0	16	$775,000	
United States	Tennessee	0	0	$5,000	
United States	Virginia	0	2	$250,000	
Total		7	203	≥ $4,108,000	

== Confirmed tornadoes ==
Confirmed tornadoes by Fujita rating
FU	F0	F1	F2	F3	F4	F5	Total
0	0	3	8	5	2	0	≥ 18

Prior to 1990, there is a likely undercount of tornadoes, particularly E/F0–1, with reports of weaker tornadoes becoming more common as population increased. A sharp increase in the annual average E/F0–1 count by approximately 200 tornadoes was noted upon the implementation of NEXRAD Doppler weather radar in 1990–1991. (Note: Historically, the number of tornadoes globally and in the United States was and is likely underrepresented: research by Grazulis on annual tornado activity suggests that, as of 2001, only 53% of yearly U.S. tornadoes were officially recorded. Documentation of tornadoes outside the United States was historically less exhaustive, owing to the lack of monitors in many nations and, in some cases, to internal political controls on public information. Most countries only recorded tornadoes that produced severe damage or loss of life. Significant low biases in U.S. tornado counts likely occurred through the early 1990s, when advanced NEXRAD was first installed and the National Weather Service began comprehensively verifying tornado occurrences.) 1974 marked the first year where significant tornado (E/F2+) counts became homogenous with contemporary values, attributed to the consistent implementation of Fujita scale assessments. (Note: The Fujita scale was devised under the aegis of scientist T. Theodore Fujita in the early 1970s. Prior to the advent of the scale in 1971, tornadoes in the United States were officially unrated. Tornado ratings were retroactively applied to events prior to the formal adoption of the F-scale by the National Weather Service. While the Fujita scale has been superseded by the Enhanced Fujita scale in the U.S. since February 1, 2007, Canada used the old scale until April 1, 2013; nations elsewhere, like the United Kingdom, apply other classifications such as the TORRO scale.) Numerous discrepancies on the details of tornadoes in this outbreak exist between sources. The total count of tornadoes and ratings differs from various agencies accordingly. The list below documents information from the most contemporary official sources alongside assessments from tornado historian Thomas P. Grazulis.

=== April 8 event ===
List of confirmed tornadoes in the tornado outbreak of April 8, 1957 (Note: All dates are based on the local time zone where the tornado touched down; however, all times are in Coordinated Universal Time and dates are split at midnight CST/CDT for consistency.)
F#	Location	County / Parish	State	Start Coord. (Note: All starting coordinates are based on the NCEI database and may not reflect contemporary analyses)	Time (UTC)	Path length	Width (Note: The listed width values are primarily the average/mean width of the tornadoes, with those having known maximum widths denoted by ♯. From 1952 to 1994, reports largely list mean width whereas contemporary years list maximum width. Values provided by Grazulis are the average width, with estimates being rounded down (i.e. 0.5 mi (0.80 km) is rounded down from 880 yards to 800 yards.)	Damage
F2	Elm Park	Scott	AR	34.9°N 94.1°W	05:05–?	4.7 mi (7.6 km)	300 yd (270 m)	$2,500
F2	This tornado, attended by minor hail, damaged roofing and three barns. Tornado expert Thomas P. Grazulis did not rate it F2 or stronger.							
F2	Northeastern Red Bay	Franklin	AL	34.45°N 88.13°W	05:35–?	0.1 mi (0.16 km)	33 yd (30 m)	$25,000
F2	This low-end F2 tornado may have begun in Mississippi before entering Red Bay, Alabama, unroofing a home, tearing porches off other homes, and destroying garages and barns. Grazulis listed total damages as $12,000 and a 5-mile-long (8.0 km) path.							
F2	Old Union to S of Verona	Lee	MS	34.1°N 88.82°W	09:10–?	9 mi (14 km)	200 yd (180 m)	$250,000
F2	A tornado passed through the agricultural experiment station—now the North Mississippi Research and Extension Center—south of Verona, destroying, unroofing, or otherwise damaging several homes and other structures. Grazulis listed total damages as $100,000.							
F2	NNE of Plateau to NE of Isoline	Cumberland	TN	36.1°N 85.1°W	12:00–?	2.7 mi (4.3 km)	10 yd (9.1 m)	$2,500
F2	This tornado downed several trees and damaged a number of outbuildings. Five houses and three barns were damaged as well. Grazulis did not rate the tornado F2 or stronger.							
F1	ESE of Banner	Calhoun	MS	33.97°N 89.33°W	14:00–?	0.1 mi (0.16 km)	100 yd (91 m)	Unknown
F1	A tornado severely damaged or destroyed a few homes.							
F3	Southern Hamilton to NNW of Piney Grove	Marion, Winston, Lawrence	AL	34.12°N 87.98°W	15:46–?	51.4 mi (82.7 km)	100 yd (91 m)	$250,000
F3	A long-tracked tornado family leveled a few small houses near the end of its path. Trees were damaged along a 1-mile-wide (1.6 km) swath, and a car was lofted and rolled 1/4 mi (0.40 km). Five people were injured, and of the losses $150,000 were to timberland, mainly in the William B. Bankhead National Forest. The tornado family consisted of two segments with intermittent damage in between, passing south of Ashridge and Grayson.							
F3	ENE of Battleground to NNE of Cottonville	Morgan, Marshall	AL	34.32°N 86.98°W	16:15−?	38.8 mi (62.4 km)	200 yd (180 m)	$500
F3	2 deaths – A long-lived tornado hit between Florette and Oleander, destroying or damaging more than 150 homes in the small, rural communities of Rock Creek, Lawrence Cove, Briddle Mountain, and Cotaco Valley—all in southern Morgan County. At least 90—perhaps as many as 125—people were injured.							
F3	S of Hulaco to SE of Union Grove	Cullman, Morgan, Marshall	AL	34.3°N 86.6°W	16:30–?	16.3 mi (26.2 km)	33 yd (30 m)	$250,000
F3	This tornado, roughly paralleling the previous event, destroyed several barns and small homes. Grazulis rated it F2. The NCEI list the path as extending to near Warrenton and Mount Carmel.							
F2	SSE of Reeves to southern Calhoun to NNE of Crane Eater	Gordon	GA	34.43°N 85°W	19:00–?	10.3 mi (16.6 km)	200 yd (180 m)	$250,000
F2	A yellowish-appearing tornado destroyed or damaged 70 structures, including mobile homes in a trailer park. 20 people were injured.							
F2	Cross Keys to SSE of Santuc	Union	SC	34.63°N 81.78°W	21:00–21:30	15.2 mi (24.5 km)	100 yd (91 m)	$25,000
F2	A tornado destroyed or damaged approximately 60–63 homes and 67 other structures, injuring a few people. The Climatological Data National Summary and Grazulis listed a 20-mile-long (32 km) path length. The tornado may have begun as far west as Cross Anchor. Damage at Santuc and nearby Carlisle may have been downburst-related.							
F1	SE of Chula to eastern Douglas	Tift, Irwin, Coffee	GA	31.53°N 83.53°W	21:00–22:00	41.3 mi (66.5 km)	90 yd (82 m)	$250,000
F1	An intermittent, long-tracked tornado unroofed a large home and shifted other homes on their foundations. A lumber mill and a barn were destroyed as well. Damage occurred near Harding, Riverbend, Gladys, and Lax. Grazulis rated the tornado F2.							
F3	China Hill to ENE of Jacksonville	Telfair	GA	31.85°N 83.08°W	21:30–?	14.7 mi (23.7 km)	400 yd (370 m)	$25,000
F3	1 death – An intense tornado hurled a truck 100 yd (300 ft), the two occupants of which it killed and injured, respectively. A church and a pair of small homes were destroyed as well. A large refrigerator was moved 250 yd (750 ft). Four other people were injured.							
F2	SSW of Bowmantown to WNW of Fairview	Washington	TN	36.28°N 82.58°W	21:30–21:40	3 mi (4.8 km)	440 yd (400 m)	$2,500
F2	A short-tracked tornado unroofed a silo and felled approximately 20 large trees. A barn was shifted 3 ft (1.0 yd) off its foundation, and flying debris damaged a home. Grazulis did not rate the tornado F2 or stronger.							
F4	NNW of Pleasant Plain (SC) to Jefferson (SC) to Wallace (SC) to eastern Roseboro (NC)	Lancaster (SC), Chesterfield (SC), Marlboro (SC), Scotland (NC), Robeson (NC), Cumberland (NC), Sampson (NC)	SC, NC	34.63°N 80.58°W	22:00–?	121.4 mi (195.4 km)	150 yd (140 m)	$1,750,000
F4	4 deaths – See section on this tornado – 80 people were injured.							
F1	Northern Norfolk	Norfolk	VA	36.93°N 76.28°W	22:20–?	1 mi (1.6 km)	33 yd (30 m)	$250,000
F1	A brief tornado passed between Naval Station Norfolk and Forest Lawn Cemetery in Norfolk, southwest of Ocean View, wrecking signage, damaging an unfinished warehouse, shattering windows, unroofing structures, and splintering utility poles. Two people were injured.							
F2	ESE of Benevolence to SSW of Weston	Randolph	GA	31.87°N 84.7°W	23:30–?	5.2 mi (8.4 km)	200 yd (180 m)	$25,000
F2	A tornado destroyed or damaged a school, a church, a few barns, and three homes. One person was injured.							
F4	Downtown Pembroke	Robeson	NC	34.68°N 79.2°W	01:00–?	0.8 mi (1.3 km)	150 yd (140 m)	$250,000
F4	A brief-but-violent tornado parabolically tracked through Pembroke, where it damaged approximately 100 structures, of which it reportedly destroyed 25. Many small, poorly built homes were leveled as well. 21 people were injured. Grazulis rated the tornado F3, but noted "F4-appearing" damage to frail homes.							
F3	NE of Brices Crossroads	Duplin	NC	34.83°N 78.08°W	02:00–?	8 mi (13 km)	150 yd (140 m)	$250,000
F3	An intense tornado leveled nine homes in rural areas near Rose Hill and Magnolia. It also damaged a dozen other homes, scattering debris over many acres and tearing apart a concrete-block foundation. 29 people were injured. The tornado produced F4-like damage, but only hit flimsy, unreinforced houses.							

=== Flat Creek–Jefferson–Cheraw–Wallace–McColl, South Carolina/Johns–Maxton–Roseboro–Parkersburg, North Carolina ===
Flat Creek–Jefferson–Cheraw–Wallace–McColl, South Carolina/Johns–Maxton–Roseboro–Parkersburg, North Carolina
Meteorological history
- Formed: April 8, 1957, 6:00 p.m. EDT (UTC−04:00)

F4 tornado
- on the Fujita scale

Overall effects
- Fatalities: 4
- Injuries: 80
- Damage: $1 3/4 million ($20,060,000 in 2025 USD)

This long-lived tornado family comprised at least two separate tornadoes, both of which may have been tornado families themselves. The first member of the tornado family touched down near Flat Creek and moved into the town of Jefferson, where it destroyed or damaged 141 homes, along with 156 other structures. It also tore apart 23 of 25 buildings on Main Street. As it left Jefferson, the tornado generated a swath of near-continuous damage, indicative of F2 and F3 intensity, that extended from Jefferson to near Cheraw and Wallace. The tornado destroyed or damaged 25 homes in Wallace. Parts of a cotton gin were found 10 mi (16 km) distant. 16 injuries occurred in South Carolina, all in Chesterfield County, and losses statewide totaled $750,000 (Grazulis listed damages as $1 million). The second member of the tornado family, described as a wide funnel, touched down near McColl and crossed into North Carolina near Johns and east of Maxton. In this area the tornado destroyed several barns, a gas station, and small homes, but was not of violent intensity. The tornado later tracked near St. Pauls en route to Roseboro. Its only confirmable F4 damage occurred in a pair of small communities between Roseboro and Parkersburg, where four people died and approximately 20 homes were destroyed. More than 387 homes, businesses, and other structures were damaged or destroyed along the path, including more than 100 in Sampson County alone. In all, 80 people were injured and losses totaled $1 3/4 million.

== Other effects ==
Severe thunderstorm winds gusted to 75 mph (121 km/h) at Bristol, Virginia. Additionally, 4-inch-diameter (10 cm) hail was recorded in Anderson County, South Carolina.

== See also ==
- List of North American tornadoes and tornado outbreaks
- Tornado outbreak of April 1977

== Sources ==
- Agee, Ernest M.; Childs, Samuel (June 1, 2014). "Adjustments in Tornado Counts, F-Scale Intensity, and Path Width for Assessing Significant Tornado Destruction". Journal of Applied Meteorology and Climatology. 53 (6). American Meteorological Society: 1494–1505. Bibcode:2014JApMC..53.1494A. doi:10.1175/JAMC-D-13-0235.1.
- Brooks, Harold E. (April 2004). "On the Relationship of Tornado Path Length and Width to Intensity". Weather and Forecasting. 19 (2): 310–19. Bibcode:2004WtFor..19..310B. doi:10.1175/1520-0434(2004)019<0310:OTROTP>2.0.CO;2.
- Cook, A. R.; Schaefer, J. T. (August 2008). "The Relation of El Niño–Southern Oscillation (ENSO) to Winter Tornado Outbreaks". Monthly Weather Review. 136 (8): 3121–3137. Bibcode:2008MWRv..136.3121C. doi:10.1175/2007MWR2171.1.
- Edwards, Roger; LaDue, James G.; Ferree, John T.; Scharfenberg, Kevin; Maier, Chris; Coulbourne, William L. (May 1, 2013). "Tornado Intensity Estimation: Past, Present, and Future". Bulletin of the American Meteorological Society. 94 (5). American Meteorological Society: 641–653. Bibcode:2013BAMS...94..641E. doi:10.1175/BAMS-D-11-00006.1.
- Grazulis, Thomas P. (May 1984). Violent Tornado Climatography, 1880–1982. OSTI (Technical report). NUREG. Washington, D.C.: Nuclear Regulatory Commission. OSTI 7099491. CR-3670.
  - — (November 1990). Significant Tornadoes 1880–1989. Vol. 2. St. Johnsbury, Vermont: The Tornado Project of Environmental Films. ISBN 1-879362-02-3.
  - — (July 1993). Significant Tornadoes 1680–1991: A Chronology and Analysis of Events. St. Johnsbury, Vermont: The Tornado Project of Environmental Films. ISBN 1-879362-03-1.
  - — (2001a). The Tornado: Nature's Ultimate Windstorm. Norman: University of Oklahoma Press. ISBN 978-0-8061-3538-0.
  - — (2001b). F5-F6 Tornadoes. St. Johnsbury, Vermont: The Tornado Project of Environmental Films.
- National Weather Service (April 1957). Storm Data Publication (Report). National Centers for Environmental Information – via Storm Events Database.
- U.S. Weather Bureau (April 1957). "Storm data and unusual weather phenomena". Climatological Data National Summary. 8 (4). Asheville, North Carolina: National Climatic Data Center: 116–8.
