= Gordon High School =

Gordon High School can refer to:

- Gordon High School (Georgia) in Decatur, Georgia
- Gordon High School (Texas) in Gordon, Texas
- Gordon High School (Nebraska) in Gordon, Nebraska
- Gordon Central High School, Calhoun, Georgia
- Gordon Junior High School (former name of Rose L. Hardy Middle School) in Washington, DC
