= Ryo =

Ryo may refer to:

- Ryō, a gold currency unit in pre-Meiji Japan Shakkanhō system
- Ryō (actress) (born 1973), Japanese model, actress, and singer
- Ryō (given name), a unisex Japanese given name
- Ryo, Georgia, an unincorporated community in Gordon County, in the U.S. state of Georgia

== See also ==
- RYO (disambiguation)
