= McDaniel (disambiguation) =

McDaniel is a surname. It may also refer to:

- McDaniel, Maryland, an unincorporated community in the United States
- McDaniel Lake, Missouri
- McDaniel College, Westminster, Maryland
  - McDaniel College Budapest, the European campus of McDaniel College

== See also ==
- McDaniels, Georgia, United States, an unincorporated community
- McDaniels, Kentucky, United States, an unincorporated community
