= Lewis Corner =

Lewis Corner or Lewis Corners may refer to:

- Lewis Corner, Georgia, an unincorporated community
- Lewis Corner, Maryland, an unincorporated community
- Lewis Corners, New York, a hamlet in Oswego County, New York
- Lewis Corners, New York, a hamlet in Oneida County, New York

== See also ==
- Louis Corners, Wisconsin
