= Gordon County, Georgia =

County in Georgia, United States

- County
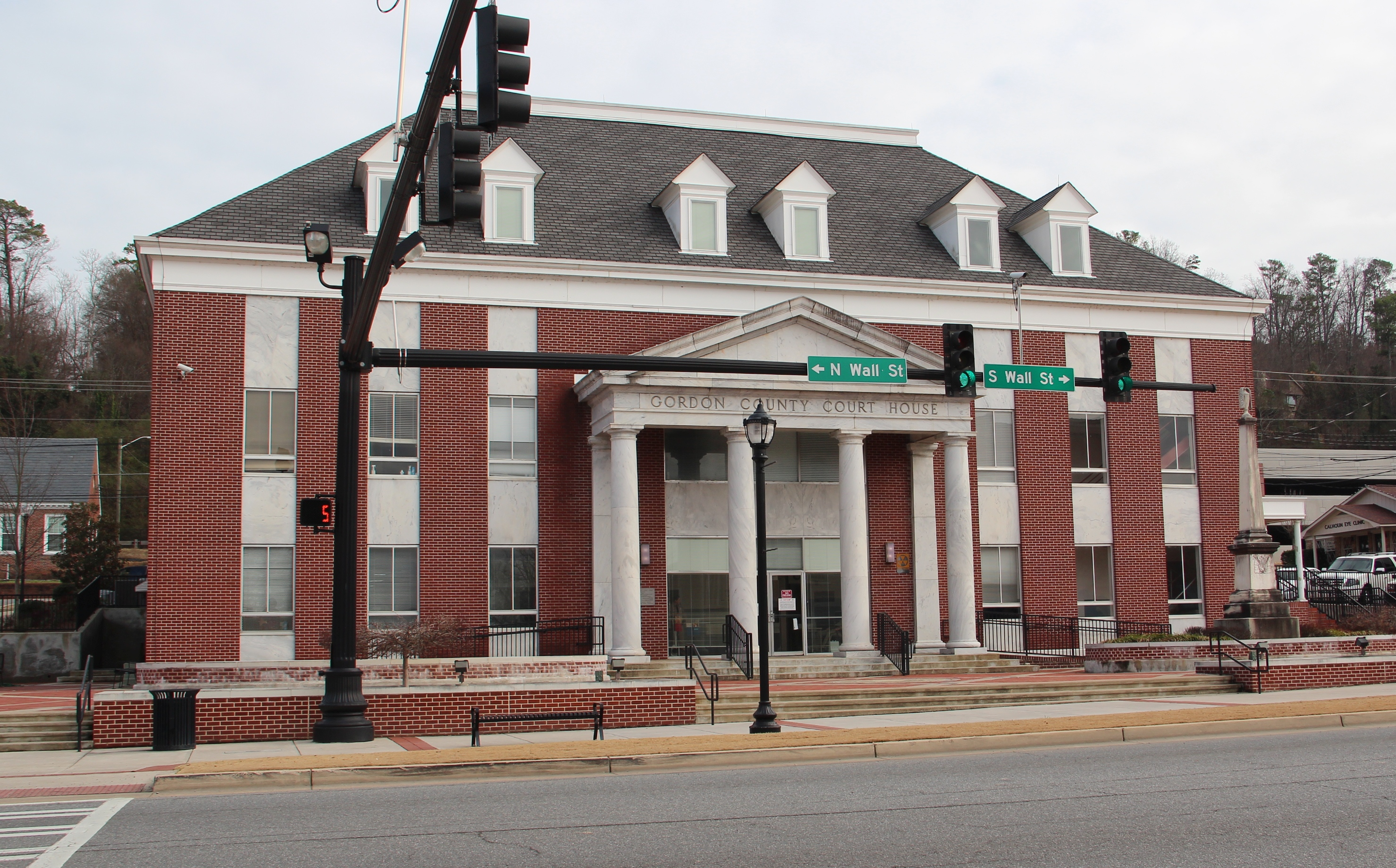
- Gordon County Courthouse

- Location within the U.S. state of Georgia
- Coordinates: 34°30′N 84°52′W
- Country: United States
- State: Georgia
- Founded: February 13, 1850; 176 years ago
- Named for: William Washington Gordon
- Seat: Calhoun
- Largest city: Calhoun

Area
  - Total: 358 sq mi (930 km^{2})
  - Land: 356 sq mi (920 km^{2})
  - Water: 2.2 sq mi (5.7 km^{2}) 0.6%

Population (2020)
  - Total: 57,544
  - Estimate (2025): 61,701 ▲
  - Density: 162/sq mi (62.4/km^{2})
- Time zone: UTC−5 (Eastern)
  - Summer (DST): UTC−4 (EDT)
- Congressional district: 11th
- Website: www.gordoncountyga.gov

Gordon County is a county in the Northwest region of the U.S. state of Georgia. As of the 2020 census, the population was 57,544. The county seat is Calhoun. Gordon County comprises the Calhoun, GA Micropolitan Statistical Area, which is included in the Atlanta–Athens-Clarke County–Sandy Springs, GA-AL CSA.

== History ==
Gordon County was created on February 13, 1850, by an act of the Georgia General Assembly. The new county was formed from portions of Cass (later renamed Bartow) and Floyd counties. All lands that would become Gordon County were originally occupied by the Cherokee Indians—and, in fact, the area was home of New Echota, the last seat of the Cherokee Nation. Even while Cherokees remained on their homeland, the General Assembly enacted legislation in December 1830 that provided for surveying the Cherokee Nation in Georgia and dividing it into sections, districts, and land lots. Subsequently, the legislature identified this entire area as "Cherokee County" (even though it never functioned as a county). An act of December 3, 1832, divided the Cherokee lands into ten new counties—Cass (later renamed Bartow), Cherokee, Cobb, Floyd, Forsyth, Gilmer, Lumpkin, Murray, Paulding, and Union. Cherokee lands were distributed to whites in a land lottery, but the legislature temporarily prohibited whites from taking possession of lots on which Cherokees still lived.

It was not until December 29, 1835, that Georgia had an official basis for claiming the unceded Cherokee lands that included the future location of Gordon County. In the Treaty of New Echota, a faction of the Cherokees agreed to give up all Cherokee claims to land in Georgia, Alabama, Tennessee, and North Carolina and move west in return for $5 million. Though a majority of Cherokees opposed the treaty and refused to leave, the U.S. and Georgia considered it binding. In 1838, U.S. Army troops rounded up the last of 15,000 Cherokees in Georgia and forced them to march west in what came to be known as the "Trail of Tears", making this area the starting point of the removal.

Gordon County's original 1850 boundaries were changed numerous times between 1852 and 1877, during which time the legislature transferred portions of Cass (Bartow), Floyd, Murray, Pickens, and Walker counties to Gordon County, while transferring land from Gordon to Floyd and Murray counties.

Georgia's 94th county was named for William Washington Gordon (1796–1842), the first Georgian to graduate from West Point and first president of the Central of Georgia Railroad.

== Geography ==
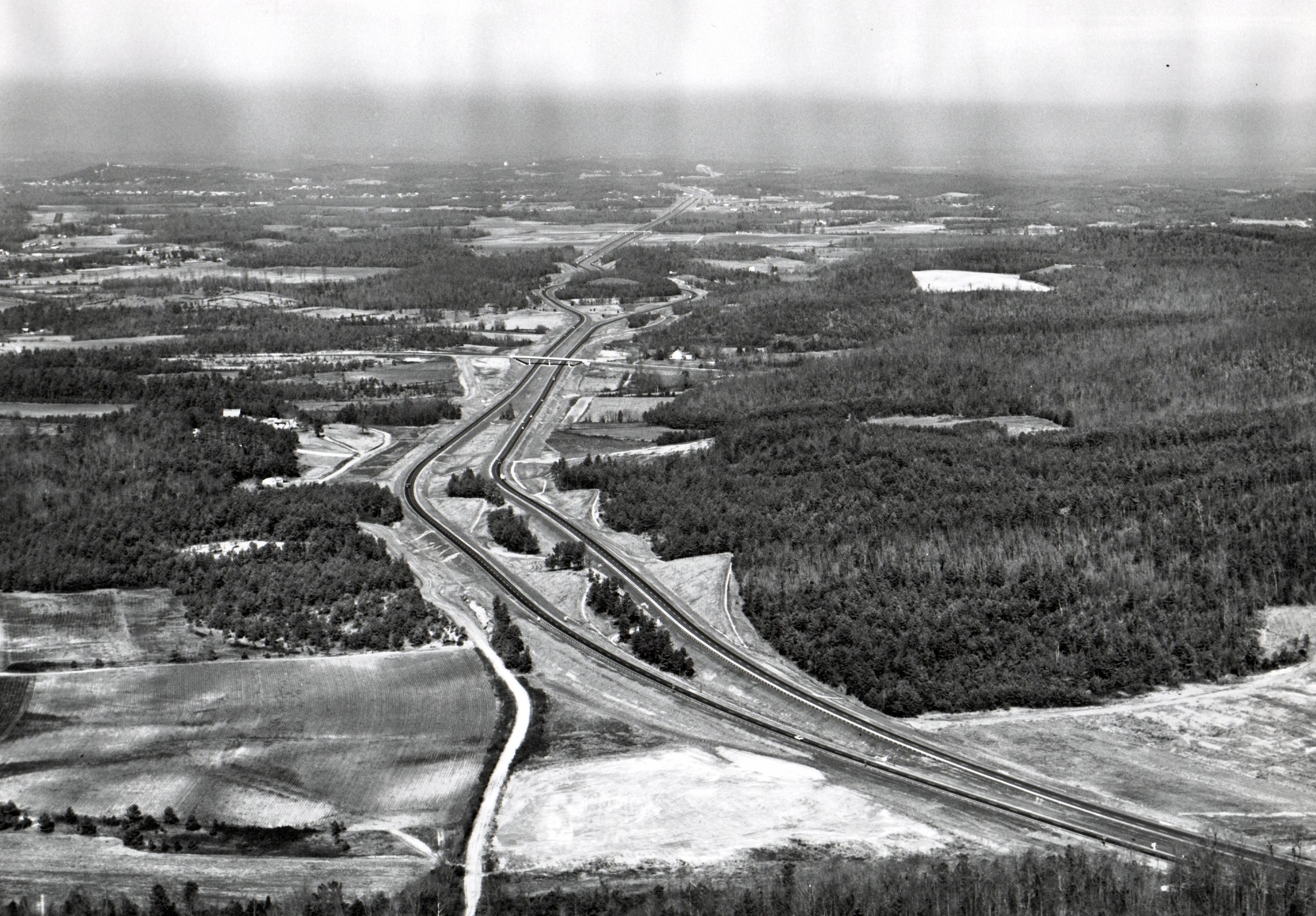
Aerial view of Interstate 75 between Adairsville and Calhoun, 1967

According to the U.S. Census Bureau, the county has a total area of 358 square miles (930 km^{2}), of which 356 square miles (920 km^{2}) is land and 2.2 square miles (5.7 km^{2}) (0.6%) is water.

Mountains in Gordon County include Baugh Mountain and Horn Mountain.

The eastern half of Gordon County is located in the Coosawattee River sub-basin of the ACT River Basin (Coosa-Tallapoosa River Basin). Most of the western half of the county is located in the Oostanaula River sub-basin of the same larger ACT River Basin, while a small northerly portion of the county, between Resaca and Industrial City, is in the Conasauga River sub-basin of the ACT River Basin.

Gordon County has the most interstate exits out of all of the counties in Georgia, because of its location in the middle of Interstate 75.

=== Major highways ===
- I-75 / SR 401 – SR 401 is the unsigned designation for I-75
- US 41 / SR 3
- US 411 / SR 61
- SR 53
  - SR 53 Spur (Calhoun)
- SR 136
  - SR 136 Conn. (Calhoun)
- SR 156
- SR 225

=== Adjacent counties ===
- Murray County - north
- Whitfield County - north
- Gilmer County - northeast
- Pickens County - east
- Cherokee County - southeast
- Bartow County - south
- Floyd County - west
- Walker County - northwest

=== National protected area ===
- Chattahoochee National Forest (part)

== Demographics ==
Historical population
| Census | Pop. | Note | %± |
|---|---|---|---|
| 1850 | 5,984 | | — |
| 1860 | 10,146 | | 69.6% |
| 1870 | 9,268 | | −8.7% |
| 1880 | 11,171 | | 20.5% |
| 1890 | 12,758 | | 14.2% |
| 1900 | 14,119 | | 10.7% |
| 1910 | 15,861 | | 12.3% |
| 1920 | 17,736 | | 11.8% |
| 1930 | 16,846 | | −5.0% |
| 1940 | 18,445 | | 9.5% |
| 1950 | 18,922 | | 2.6% |
| 1960 | 19,228 | | 1.6% |
| 1970 | 23,570 | | 22.6% |
| 1980 | 30,070 | | 27.6% |
| 1990 | 35,072 | | 16.6% |
| 2000 | 44,104 | | 25.8% |
| 2010 | 55,186 | | 25.1% |
| 2020 | 57,544 | | 4.3% |
| 2025 (est.) | 61,701 | ▲ | 7.2% |
U.S. Decennial Census; 1790-1880 1890-1910; 1920-1930 1930-1940; 1940-1950 1960-1980; 1980-2000 2010

=== Racial and ethnic composition ===
Gordon County, Georgia – racial and ethnic composition Note: the US Census treats Hispanic/Latino as an ethnic category. This table excludes Latinos from the racial categories and assigns them to a separate category. Hispanics/Latinos may be of any race.
| Race / ethnicity (NH = Non-Hispanic) | Pop 1980 | Pop 1990 | Pop 2000 | Pop 2010 | Pop 2020 | % 1980 | % 1990 | % 2000 | % 2010 | % 2020 |
|---|---|---|---|---|---|---|---|---|---|---|
| White alone (NH) | 28,561 | 33,350 | 38,642 | 44,107 | 43,317 | 94.98% | 95.09% | 87.62% | 79.92% | 75.28% |
| Black or African American alone (NH) | 1,310 | 1,314 | 1,511 | 1,945 | 2,075 | 4.36% | 3.75% | 3.43% | 3.52% | 3.61% |
| Native American or Alaska Native alone (NH) | 19 | 82 | 90 | 130 | 122 | 0.06% | 0.23% | 0.20% | 0.24% | 0.21% |
| Asian alone (NH) | 43 | 121 | 225 | 522 | 719 | 0.14% | 0.35% | 0.51% | 0.95% | 1.25% |
| Native Hawaiian or Pacific Islander alone (NH) | x | x | 11 | 49 | 15 | x | x | 0.02% | 0.09% | 0.03% |
| Other race alone (NH) | 9 | 5 | 23 | 44 | 123 | 0.03% | 0.01% | 0.05% | 0.08% | 0.21% |
| Mixed-race or multiracial (NH) | x | x | 334 | 651 | 2,216 | x | x | 0.76% | 1.18% | 3.85% |
| Hispanic or Latino (any race) | 128 | 200 | 3,268 | 7,738 | 8,957 | 0.43% | 0.57% | 7.41% | 14.02% | 15.57% |
| Total | 30,070 | 35,072 | 44,104 | 55,186 | 57,544 | 100.00% | 100.00% | 100.00% | 100.00% | 100.00% |

=== 2020 census ===
As of the 2020 census, there were 57,544 people, 21,210 households, and 15,002 families residing in the county.

The median age was 39.1 years; 24.4% of residents were under the age of 18 and 15.8% of residents were 65 years of age or older, and for every 100 females there were 96.5 males, with 93.4 males per 100 females age 18 and over.

40.1% of residents lived in urban areas, while 59.9% lived in rural areas.

The racial makeup of the county was 78.4% White, 3.7% Black or African American, 0.6% American Indian and Alaska Native, 1.3% Asian, 0.0% Native Hawaiian and Pacific Islander, 8.0% from some other race, and 8.0% from two or more races. Hispanic or Latino residents of any race comprised 15.6% of the population.

There were 21,210 households in the county, of which 34.3% had children under the age of 18 living with them and 25.4% had a female householder with no spouse or partner present. About 23.4% of all households were made up of individuals and 10.6% had someone living alone who was 65 years of age or older.

There were 22,736 housing units, of which 6.7% were vacant. Among occupied housing units, 67.7% were owner-occupied and 32.3% were renter-occupied. The homeowner vacancy rate was 1.3% and the rental vacancy rate was 5.5%.

=== 2010 census ===
As of the 2010 United States census, there were 55,186 people, 19,715 households, and 14,653 families living in the county. The population density was 155.1 inhabitants per square mile (59.9/km^{2}). There were 22,278 housing units at an average density of 62.6 units per square mile (24.2 units/km^{2}). The racial makeup of the county was 85.2% white, 3.6% black or African American, 1.0% Asian, 0.4% American Indian, 0.1% Pacific islander, 7.7% from other races, and 2.0% from two or more races. Those of Hispanic or Latino origin made up 14.0% of the population. In terms of ancestry, 14.6% were American, 9.8% were Irish, 6.9% were English, and 6.7% were German.

Of the 19,715 households, 39.3% had children under the age of 18 living with them, 55.8% were married couples living together, 12.9% had a female householder with no husband present, 25.7% were non-families, and 21.6% of all households were made up of individuals. The average household size was 2.77 and the average family size was 3.20. The median age was 36.0 years.

The median income for a household in the county was $40,916 and the median income for a family was $47,964. Males had a median income of $37,358 versus $28,394 for females. The per capita income for the county was $18,285. About 13.7% of families and 17.1% of the population were below the poverty line, including 22.7% of those under age 18 and 17.1% of those age 65 or over.

=== 2000 census ===
As of the census of 2000, there were 44,104 people, 16,173 households, and 12,259 families living in the county. The population density was 124 people per square mile (48 people/km^{2}). There were 17,145 housing units at an average density of 48 units per square mile (19 units/km^{2}). The racial makeup of the county was 89.69% White, 3.46% Black or African American, 0.27% Native American, 0.53% Asian, 0.05% Pacific Islander, 4.98% from other races, and 1.01% from two or more races. 7.41% of the population were Hispanic or Latino of any race.

There were 16,173 households, out of which 35.80% had children under the age of 18 living with them, 60.40% were married couples living together, 11.10% had a female householder with no husband present, and 24.20% were non-families. 20.30% of all households were made up of individuals, and 8.10% had someone living alone who was 65 years of age or older. The average household size was 2.70 and the average family size was 3.08.

In the county, the population was spread out, with 26.10% under the age of 18, 9.50% from 18 to 24, 31.40% from 25 to 44, 22.50% from 45 to 64, and 10.60% who were 65 years of age or older. The median age was 34 years. For every 100 females there were 99.00 males. For every 100 females age 18 and over, there were 97.10 males.

The median income for a household in the county was $38,831, and the median income for a family was $43,184. Males had a median income of $29,761 versus $22,256 for females. The per capita income for the county was $17,586. About 7.50% of families and 9.90% of the population were below the poverty line, including 12.10% of those under age 18 and 14.30% of those age 65 or over.

== Economy ==
In addition to service industries, the economy of Gordon County is rooted in manufacturing and both heavy and light industry. Mohawk Industries, a leading manufacturer of flooring, is headquartered in Gordon County. In addition, Shaw Industries, Beaulieu International Group, LG Chem, and Kobelco Construction Machinery America - a division of Kobe Steel - have significant presences in Gordon, County.

== Culture ==
Gordon County was the home of the Georgia Yellow Hammers, an old-time music group from the 1920s. The Yellow Hammers, chiefly composed of Bill Chitwood, Clyde Evans, Bud Landress, Charles Ernest Moody, and Phil Reeve were one of the most important bands during the heyday of old-time music. They have left their mark on the community. The Calhoun High School (Calhoun, Georgia) Yellow Jackets football team play in Phil Reeve Stadium. Moody was the author of songs which are today Southern gospel standards, including "Drifting Too Far From the Shore", which has been covered and recorded by artists including Jerry Garcia, Emmylou Harris, Phil Lesh, Hank Williams and many others.

== Rail accidents ==
Two fatal rail accidents took place in Gordon County in the late 20th century. The first one was in 1981 when Southern Railway train #160 collided with a log truck near the community of Oostanaula. The engineer and the driver of the log truck were fatally injured. In 1990, Train #188 ran a stop signal at the north end of the siding at Davis, Georgia and collided with Train #G38 on the same line. The engineer and conductor on #G38 and the conductor on #188 died in this collision. A monument stands at the site of the collision near the Georgia Highway 136 crossing.

== Politics ==
Bert Lance, an advisor to Jimmy Carter's successful presidential campaign, served as chairman of the Board of Calhoun First National Bank, later acquired by Trust Company of Georgia, forerunner of SunTrust; it is now part of Truist Financial. As of 2020, Carter is the final Democratic nominee to win Gordon County (1980).

Since 1980, Republicans have had a strong base in Gordon County. As of the 2020s, Gordon County is a strongly Republican voting county, voting 81% for Donald Trump in 2024. For elections to the United States House of Representatives, Gordon County is entirely within Georgia's 11th congressional district, currently represented by Barry Loudermilk. For elections to the Georgia State Senate, Gordon County is divided between districts 52 and 54. For elections to the Georgia House of Representatives, Gordon County is divided by District 5 and District 6.

United States presidential election results for Gordon County, Georgia
| Year | Republican | | Democratic | | Third party(ies) | |
| Year | No. | % | No. | % | No. | % |
|---|---|---|---|---|---|---|
| 1912 | 58 | 4.27% | 663 | 48.79% | 638 | 46.95% |
| 1916 | 190 | 13.18% | 1,010 | 70.04% | 242 | 16.78% |
| 1920 | 929 | 56.58% | 713 | 43.42% | 0 | 0.00% |
| 1924 | 397 | 29.63% | 875 | 65.30% | 68 | 5.07% |
| 1928 | 1,039 | 58.40% | 740 | 41.60% | 0 | 0.00% |
| 1932 | 122 | 6.60% | 1,708 | 92.42% | 18 | 0.97% |
| 1936 | 504 | 19.87% | 2,026 | 79.86% | 7 | 0.28% |
| 1940 | 527 | 24.41% | 1,623 | 75.17% | 9 | 0.42% |
| 1944 | 617 | 29.73% | 1,457 | 70.22% | 1 | 0.05% |
| 1948 | 377 | 18.26% | 1,523 | 73.75% | 165 | 7.99% |
| 1952 | 880 | 28.54% | 2,203 | 71.46% | 0 | 0.00% |
| 1956 | 1,024 | 34.20% | 1,970 | 65.80% | 0 | 0.00% |
| 1960 | 1,148 | 34.78% | 2,153 | 65.22% | 0 | 0.00% |
| 1964 | 2,317 | 41.55% | 3,260 | 58.45% | 0 | 0.00% |
| 1968 | 1,815 | 29.99% | 1,161 | 19.18% | 3,077 | 50.83% |
| 1972 | 4,344 | 83.31% | 870 | 16.69% | 0 | 0.00% |
| 1976 | 1,698 | 21.91% | 6,052 | 78.09% | 0 | 0.00% |
| 1980 | 3,107 | 36.37% | 5,199 | 60.86% | 236 | 2.76% |
| 1984 | 5,566 | 68.10% | 2,607 | 31.90% | 0 | 0.00% |
| 1988 | 6,051 | 71.65% | 2,369 | 28.05% | 25 | 0.30% |
| 1992 | 5,265 | 46.95% | 4,103 | 36.59% | 1,845 | 16.45% |
| 1996 | 5,232 | 48.35% | 4,239 | 39.18% | 1,349 | 12.47% |
| 2000 | 7,944 | 65.09% | 4,032 | 33.04% | 229 | 1.88% |
| 2004 | 11,671 | 73.88% | 4,028 | 25.50% | 98 | 0.62% |
| 2008 | 13,113 | 74.27% | 4,268 | 24.17% | 274 | 1.55% |
| 2012 | 13,197 | 77.91% | 3,440 | 20.31% | 302 | 1.78% |
| 2016 | 15,191 | 79.69% | 3,181 | 16.69% | 690 | 3.62% |
| 2020 | 19,405 | 80.71% | 4,384 | 18.23% | 255 | 1.06% |
| 2024 | 22,495 | 81.49% | 4,982 | 18.05% | 129 | 0.47% |

United States Senate election results for Gordon County, Georgia2
| Year | Republican | | Democratic | | Third party(ies) | |
| Year | No. | % | No. | % | No. | % |
|---|---|---|---|---|---|---|
| 2020 | 19,011 | 79.99% | 4,182 | 17.60% | 573 | 2.41% |
| 2020 | 16,471 | 80.93% | 3,881 | 19.07% | 0 | 0.00% |

United States Senate election results for Gordon County, Georgia3
| Year | Republican | | Democratic | | Third party(ies) | |
| Year | No. | % | No. | % | No. | % |
|---|---|---|---|---|---|---|
| 2020 | 9,539 | 40.64% | 2,619 | 11.16% | 11,312 | 48.20% |
| 2020 | 16,425 | 80.70% | 3,929 | 19.30% | 0 | 0.00% |
| 2022 | 14,955 | 79.60% | 3,357 | 17.87% | 475 | 2.53% |
| 2022 | 14,055 | 82.26% | 3,032 | 17.74% | 0 | 0.00% |

Georgia Gubernatorial election results for Gordon County
| Year | Republican | | Democratic | | Third party(ies) | |
| Year | No. | % | No. | % | No. | % |
|---|---|---|---|---|---|---|
| 2022 | 16,003 | 84.64% | 2,743 | 14.51% | 161 | 0.85% |

== Education ==
=== Gordon County School District ===
==== High schools ====
- Sonoraville High School
- Gordon Central High School

==== Middle schools ====
- Redbud Middle School
- Ashworth Middle School

==== Elementary schools ====
- Fairmount Elementary School
- Belwood Elementary School
- W.L. Swain Elementary School
- Max V. Tolbert Elementary School
- Red Bud Elementary School
- Sonoraville Elementary School

=== Private schools ===
- Georgia-Cumberland Academy
- John L. Coble Elementary School

=== Calhoun city schools ===
- Calhoun Primary School - formerly known as Eastside Primary School
- Calhoun Elementary School
- Calhoun Middle School
- Calhoun High School

== Communities ==
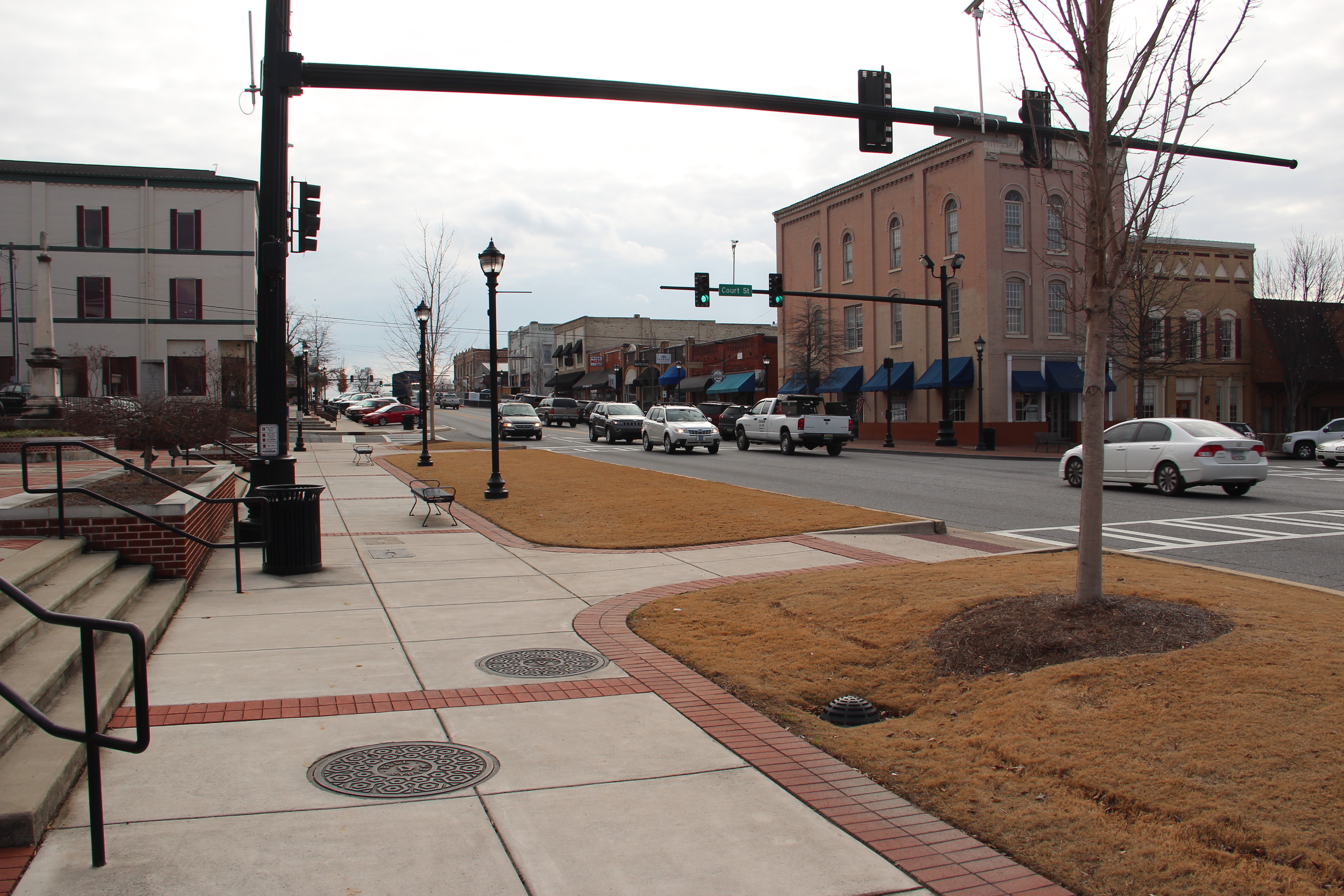
Downtown Calhoun

=== Cities ===
- Calhoun
- Fairmount
- Plainville

=== Towns ===
- Resaca

=== Unincorporated communities ===
- Audubon
- Blackwood
- Bobo
- Cash
- Colima
- Crane Eater
- Curryville
- Damascus
- Decora
- Farmville
- Fidelle
- Hill City
- Lewis Corner
- Lily Pond
- McDaniels
- New Town
- Nickelsville
- Oakman
- Oostanaula
- Petersburg
- Ranger
- Red Bud
- Reeves
- Ryo
- Sonoraville
- Soapstick
- Sugar Valley

== Media ==
- The Calhoun Times, formerly Calhoun Times and Gordon County News, is the official legal organ of Gordon County. Established in 1870, the newspaper is the oldest business in Calhoun and Gordon County. The paper is currently owned by Walker County Messenger's Times-Journal Inc., based in Marietta, Georgia.
- The Gordon Gazette publishes paywalled news and content online, since the fall of 2018.

== Recreational complexes ==
- Calhoun Recreation Department, Calhoun, Georgia
- The Sonoraville Recreational Complex in Sonoraville, Georgia

== See also ==
- National Register of Historic Places listings in Gordon County, Georgia
- Resaca Confederate Cemetery
- Gordon County, New South Wales
- List of counties in Georgia
