= Barry Hall (American football) =

American football player

No. 61, 72
- Position: Defensive end

Personal information
- Born: Fairmount, Georgia, U.S.
- Listed height: 6 ft 6 in (1.98 m)
- Listed weight: 311 lb (141 kg)

Career information
- High school: Gordon Central (Calhoun, Georgia)
- College: Middle Tennessee
- NFL draft: 2001: undrafted

Career history
- 2001–2002: Tennessee Titans
- 2002: Houston Texans
- 2003: Jacksonville Jaguars*
- * Offseason or practice squad member only

Barry Hall is an American former professional football player who was an offensive lineman for three seasons in the National Football League (NFL) with the Tennessee Titans, Houston Texans, and Jacksonville Jaguars. He played college football for the Middle Tennessee Blue Raiders.

== Career ==
Hall was born in Fairmount, Georgia, and he attended Gordon Central High School in Calhoun, Georgia. After a successful high school career, he committed to play college football at Middle Tennessee State University. After redshirting as a freshman, Hall started the remainder of his collegiate games, starting 42 games in a row, while receiving all-conference honors. Hall went undrafted in the 2001 NFL draft, before signing with the Tennessee Titans as an undrafted free agent. He made the initial 53-man roster, becoming one of the nine rookies to make the Titan's roster, however he was inactive during all 16 games. After an injury, Hall joined the Houston Texans practice squad before finishing his three-year career with the Jacksonville Jaguars.

== Personal life ==
After his playing career, Hall has become a high school football coach, and he is currently the offensive line coach at Calhoun High School. On August 15, 2017, he was inducted into the Calhoun-Gordon County Sports Hall of Fame. Hall is married and has two daughters.
