= Decora =

Decora may refer to:

- Decora, Georgia, a community in the United States
- Decora (rapper), an American hip hop artist
- a line of electrical and electronic products offered by Leviton
- Fruits (magazine), Japanese fashion magazine
- Decora (style), a Japanese street fashion seen in Harajuku, first documented by Fruits (magazine)
