= Petersburg, Gordon County, Georgia =

Unincorporated community in Georgia, U.S.

Coordinates: 34°35′12″N 84°42′56″W

Petersburg is an unincorporated community in Gordon County, in the U.S. state of Georgia.

== History ==
A post office called Petersburg was established in 1886, and remained in operation until being discontinued in 1908. According to tradition, an early German settler named Peter gave the community his first name. A school and distillery once stood at the site.
