= Ranger, Georgia =

- Unincorporated community
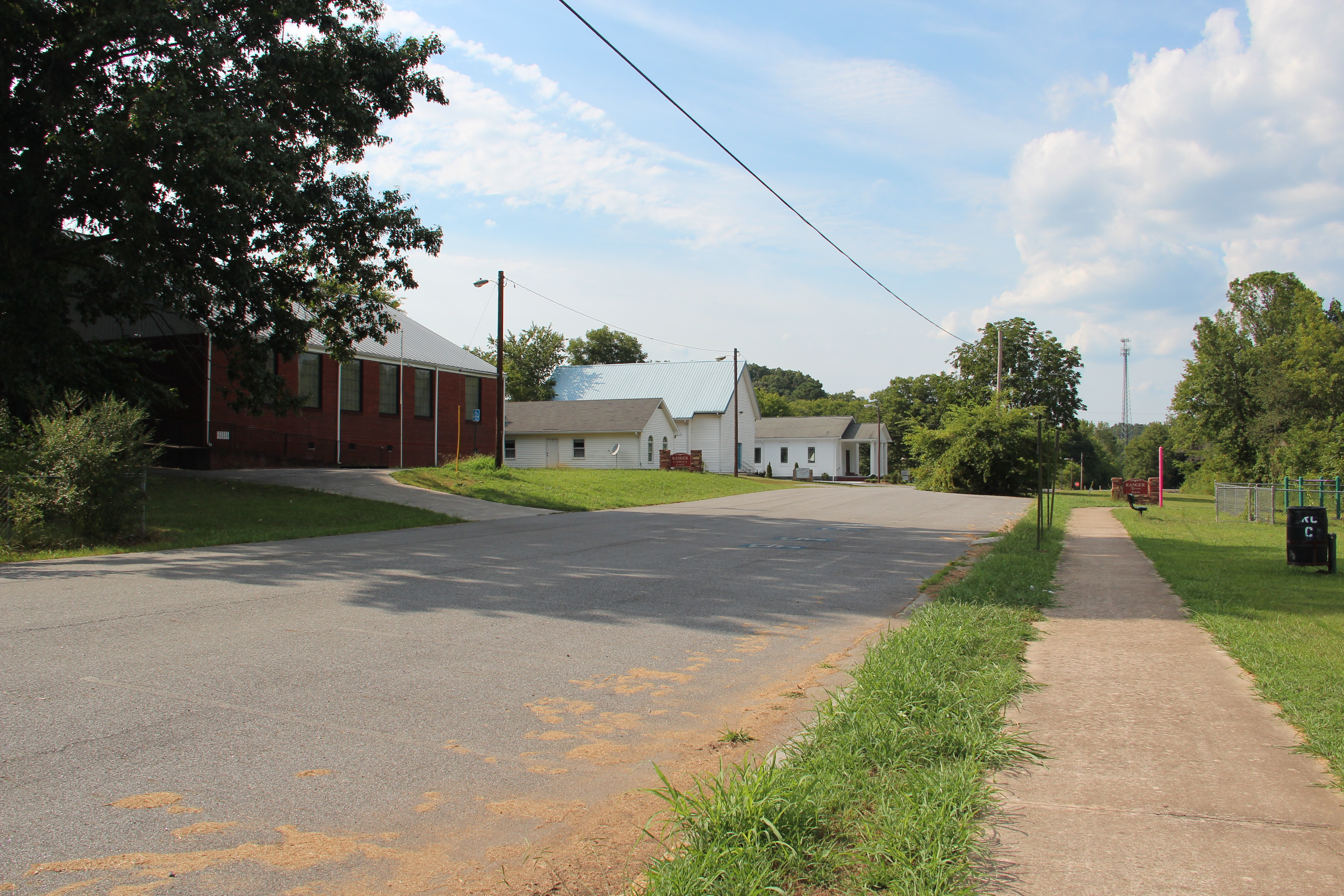
- Church Street

- Location in Gordon County and the state of Georgia
- Coordinates: 34°30′1″N 84°42′41″W
- Country: United States
- State: Georgia
- County: Gordon

Area
  - Total: 0.81 sq mi (2.11 km^{2})
  - Land: 0.81 sq mi (2.11 km^{2})
  - Water: 0 sq mi (0.00 km^{2})
- Elevation: 748 ft (228 m)

Population (2020)
  - Total: 107
  - Density: 131.1/sq mi (50.62/km^{2})
- Time zone: UTC-5 (Eastern (EST))
  - Summer (DST): UTC-4 (EDT)
- ZIP code: 30734
- Area codes: 706/762
- FIPS code: 13-63560
- GNIS feature ID: 0332791

Ranger is an unincorporated community in Gordon County, Georgia, United States. The population was 107 at the 2020 census, down from 131 in 2010.

== History ==
A post office called Ranger has been in operation since 1891. It is uncertain whether the town was named after Ranger, North Carolina, or the Confederate rangers.

The Georgia General Assembly incorporated Ranger as a town in 1910.

The town was dissolved on May 3, 2023, when Governor Brian Kemp signed HB 773, which passed in late March 2023, into law. It was a result of the town not providing police, utilities, business licenses, and in addition, not holding an election since 2005. Governmental services are now provided by Gordon County.

== Geography ==
Ranger is located in eastern Gordon County at 34°30′1″N 84°42′41″W (34.500175, -84.711392). U.S. Route 411 passes through the center of town, leading north 19 miles (31 km) to Chatsworth and south 5 miles (8 km) to Fairmount.

According to the United States Census Bureau, the town has a total area of 0.81 square miles (2.1 km^{2}), all land.

== Demographics ==
Historical population
Census	Pop.	Note	%±
1920	145		—
1930	143		−1.4%
1940	160		11.9%
1950	183		14.4%
1960	161		−12.0%
1970	140		−13.0%
1980	171		22.1%
1990	153		−10.5%
2000	85		−44.4%
2010	131		54.1%
2020	107		−18.3%
U.S. Decennial Census

As of the 2010 census there were 131 people, 46 households, and 39 families.

As of the census of 2000, there were 85 people, 33 households, and 23 families residing in the town. The population density was 104.2 inhabitants per square mile (40.2/km^{2}). There were 44 housing units at an average density of 53.9 units per square mile (20.8 units/km^{2}). The racial makeup of the town was 100.00% White. Hispanic or Latino people of any race were 2.35% of the population.

There were 33 households, out of which 18.2% had children under the age of 18 living with them, 54.5% were married couples living together, 12.1% had a female householder with no husband present, and 27.3% were non-families. 21.2% of all households were made up of individuals, and 6.1% had someone living alone who was 65 years of age or older. The average household size was 2.27 and the average family size was 2.58.

In the town, the population was spread out, with 12.9% under the age of 18, 5.9% from 18 to 24, 22.4% from 25 to 44, 30.6% from 45 to 64, and 28.2% who were 65 years of age or older. The median age was 50 years. For every 100 females, there were 97.7 males. For every 100 females age 18 and over, there were 94.7 males.

The median income for a household in the town was $26,875, and the median income for a family was $33,750. Males had a median income of $30,000 versus $23,750 for females. The per capita income for the town was $15,224. There were 13.3% of families and 8.8% of the population living below the poverty line, including no under eighteens and none of those over 64.

== Notable people ==
- Tom Graves, U.S. congressman
- Robert D. McTeer, economist
