= Fidelle, Georgia =

Unincorporated community in Georgia, United States

Coordinates: 34°36′15″N 84°49′14″W

Fidelle is an unincorporated community in Gordon County, in the U.S. state of Georgia.

== History ==
A post office called Fidelle was established in 1889, and remained in operation until being discontinued in 1908. The name is derived from Latin meaning "faithful".
