= Baugh Mountain =

Mountain in Georgia, United States

Coordinates: 34.5439744°N 85.0210568°W

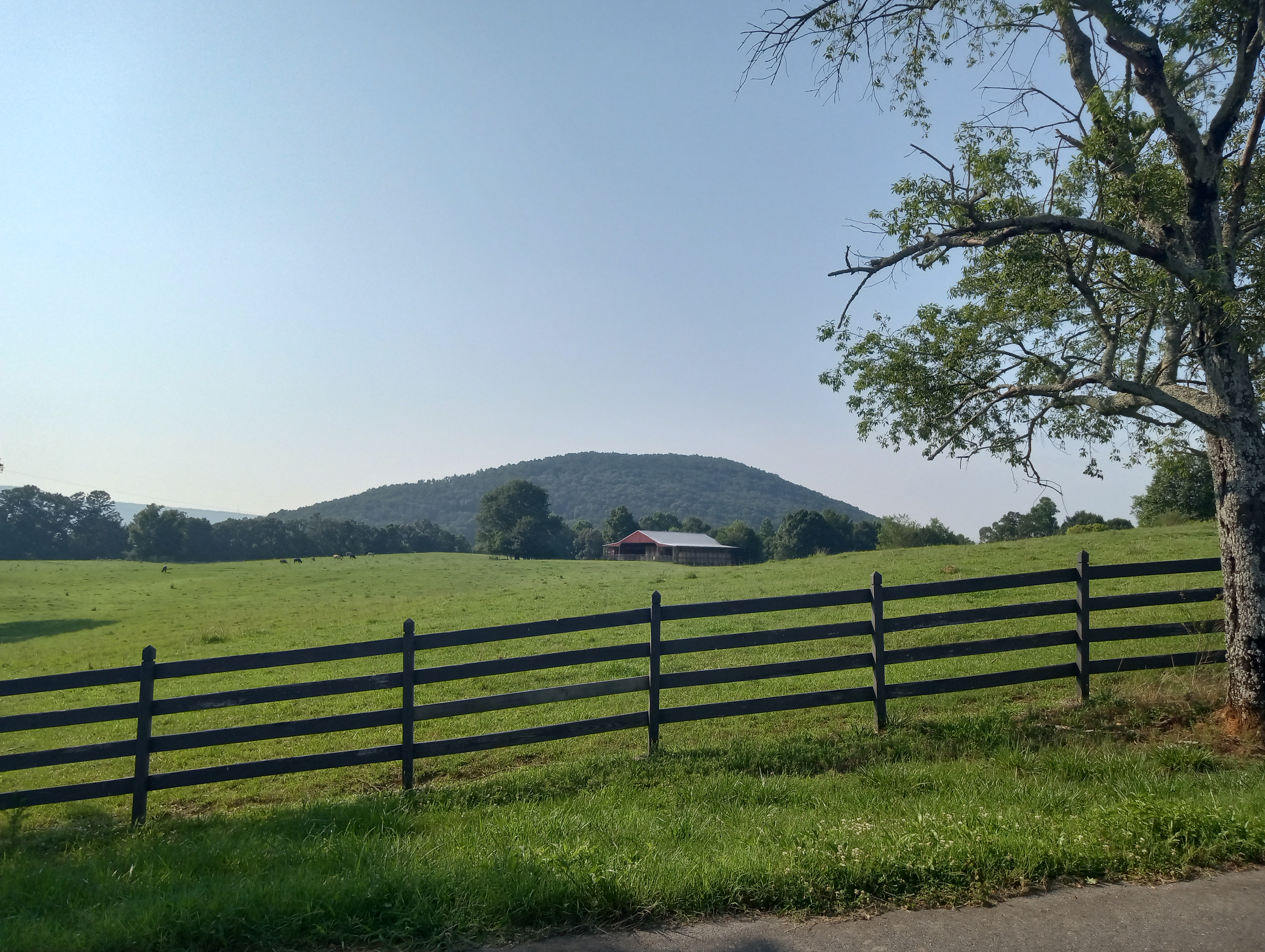
Baugh Mountain, viewed from the south

Baugh Mountain is a summit in Gordon County, Georgia. With an elevation of 1,138 feet (347 m), Baugh Mountain is the 802nd highest summit in the state of Georgia.

Baugh Mountain was named for John Baugh, the first white settler of Sugar Valley.
