= Farmville, Georgia =

Unincorporated community in Georgia, United States

Coordinates: 34°26′54″N 84°50′40″W

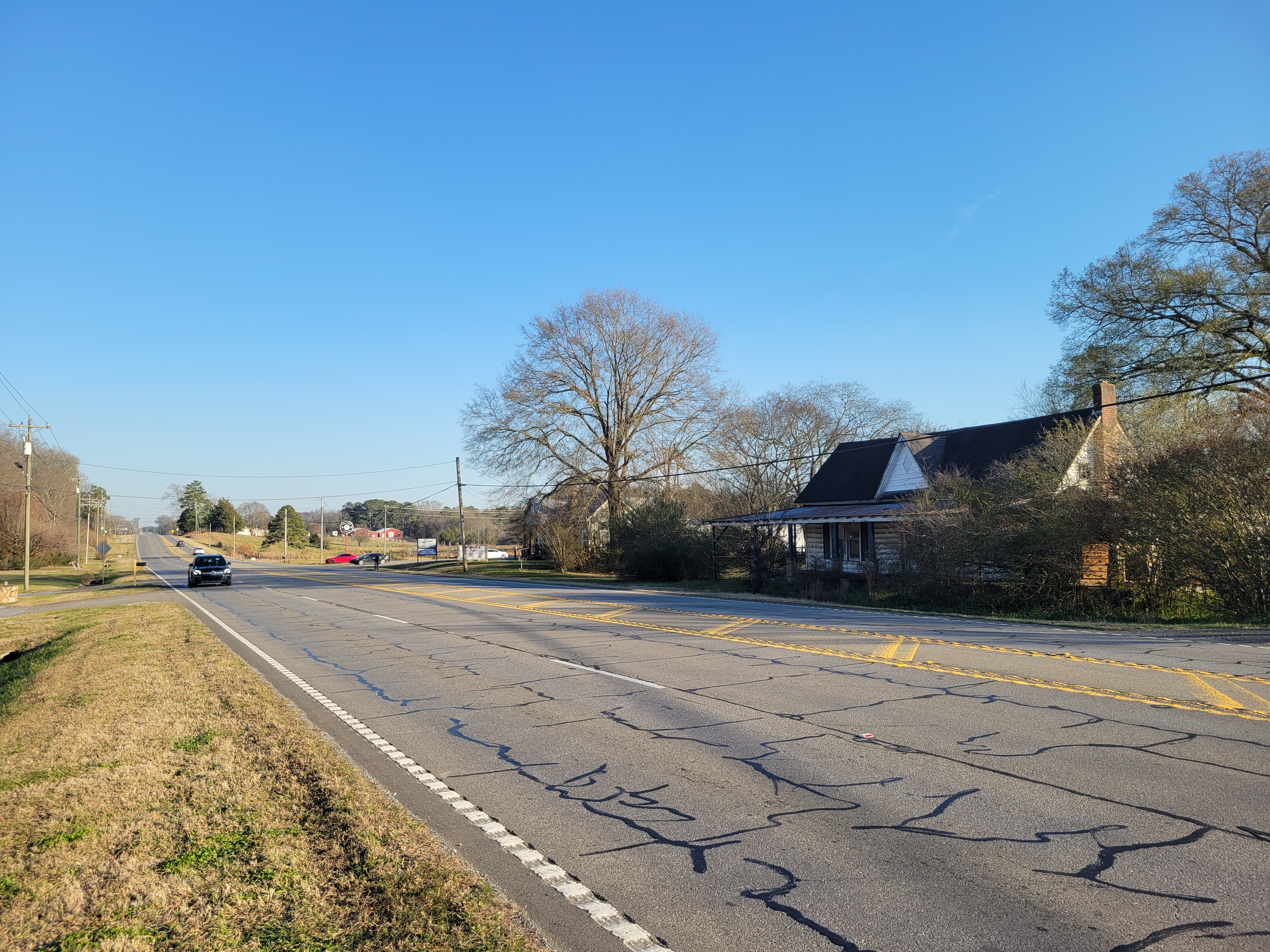
Georgia State Route 53

Farmville is an unincorporated community in Gordon County, in the U.S. state of Georgia.

== History ==
A post office called Farmville was established in 1889, and remained in operation until being discontinued in 1907. The name is probably descriptive.
