= Blackwood, Georgia =

Unincorporated community in Georgia, United States

Coordinates: 34°27′23″N 84°54′10″W

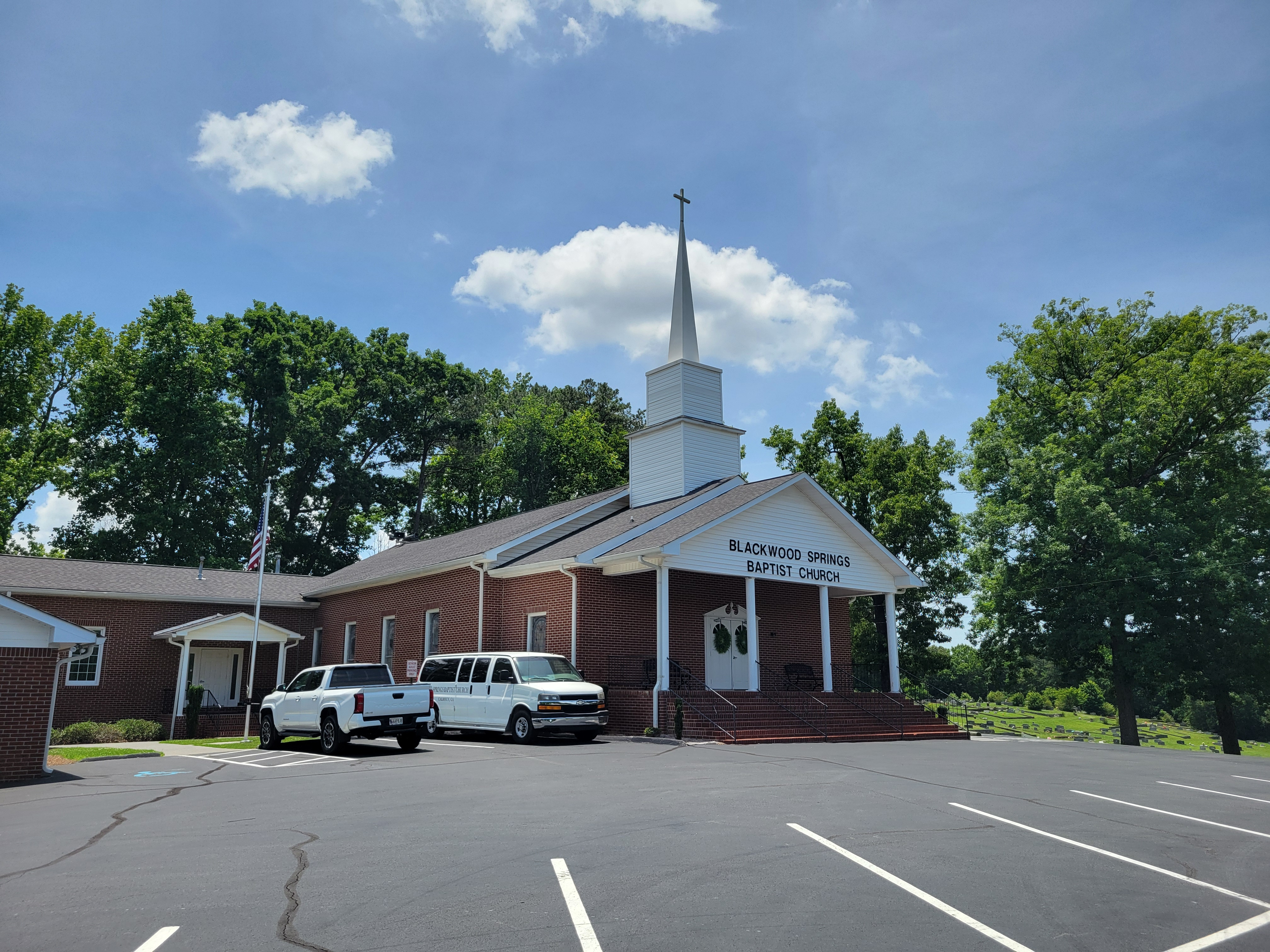
Blackwood Springs Baptist Church

Blackwood (also called Blackwood Springs) is an unincorporated community in Gordon County, in the U.S. state of Georgia.

== History ==
A post office called Blackwood was established in 1884, and remained in operation until being discontinued in 1901. Blackwood was named in honor of a Native American (Indian) chief.
