= Bobo, Georgia =

Unincorporated community in Georgia, United States

Coordinates: 34°28′36″N 84°40′31″W

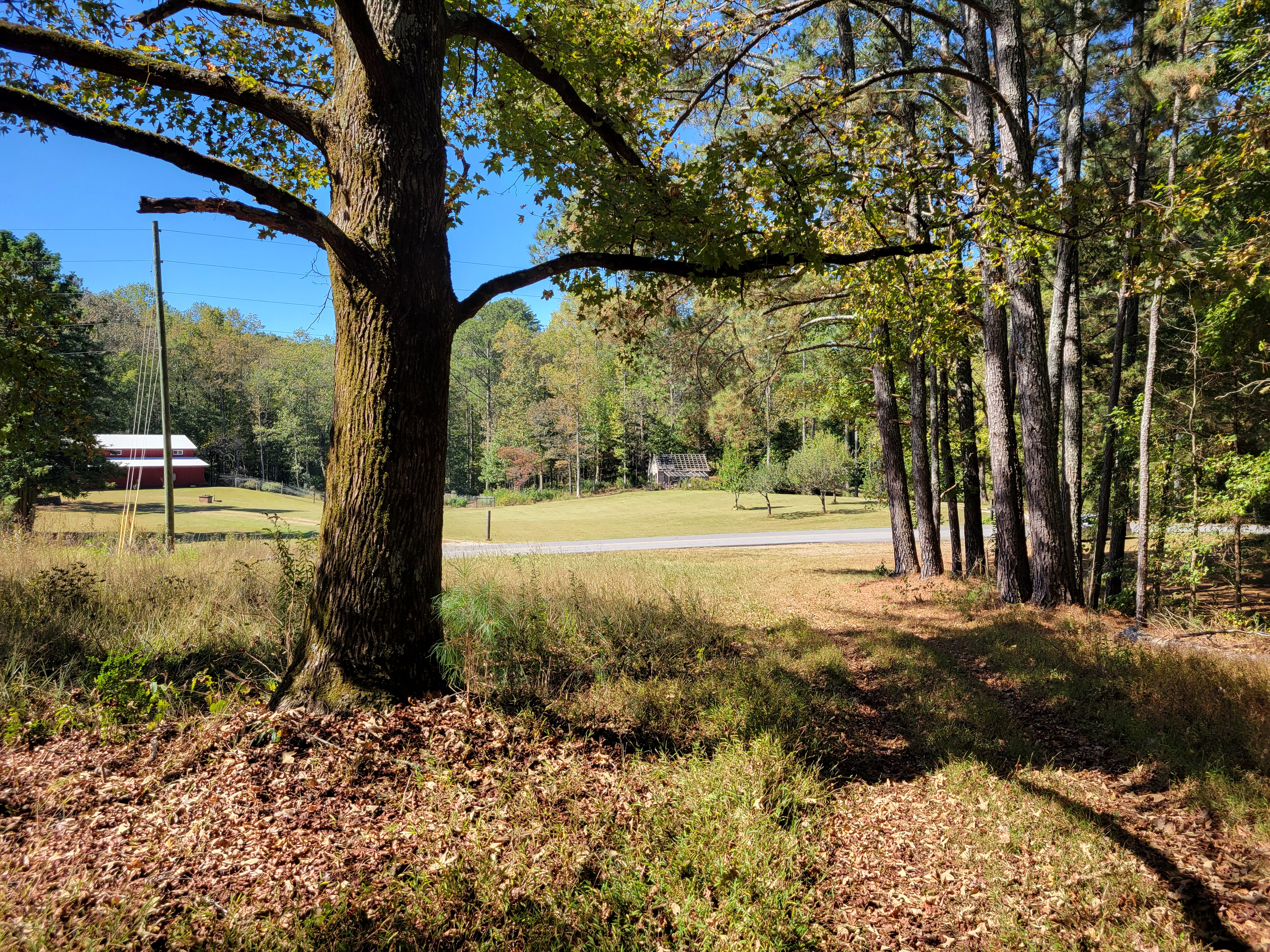
Old homestead (across the road)

Bobo is an unincorporated community in Gordon County, in the U.S. state of Georgia.

== History ==
A post office called Bobo was established in 1885, and remained in operation until it was discontinued in 1905. The name honors the Bobo family of settlers.
