= Lily Pond, Georgia =

Unincorporated community in Georgia, United States

Coordinates: 34°26′02″N 84°57′07″W

Lily Pond is an unincorporated community in Gordon County, in the U.S. state of Georgia.

== History ==
A post office called Lilly Pond was established in 1872, and remained in operation until being discontinued in 1910. The community was named after the lilly pads in a pond near the original town site.
