= Walker County Messenger =

- Type: Weekly Newspaper
- Format: Broadsheet
- Publisher: Times-Journal Inc.
- Founded: July 27, 1877
- Headquarters: LaFayette, Georgia
- Sister newspapers: Calhoun Times, Catoosa County News, Rome News, Polk Standard
- Website: www.northwestgeorgianews.com/catoosa_walker_news/

The Walker County Messenger is a weekly broadsheet newspaper published in LaFayette, Georgia, distributed throughout the greater Walker county area of northwest Georgia. It was the first newspaper to be published in LaFayette, Walker County, and was recently purchased by Times-Journal Inc., a Marietta, Georgia-based company which owns over five Georgia newspapers. The current president and editor of the newspaper is Don Stilwell.

== History ==
=== Beginnings ===
First published on July 27, 1877, the Walker County Messenger was the first newspaper to be established in LaFayette, Walker County, Georgia. Captain Augustus McHan and son E.A. McHan served as the primary editors of the original newspaper, making E.A. McHan, aged 16, the youngest southern editor at the time. Yearly subscriptions to the Messenger, six-columns and four-pages at the time, began at one dollar. The paper also served the Chattooga, Catoosa, and Dade counties until newspapers were created within the counties.

=== Change in ownership ===
The McHans sold the paper to Nathan Campbell Napier in 1880, but E.A. McHan continued to work as the editor-in-chief, before eventually retiring. Napier continued to run the newspaper for 21 years before relinquishing ownership to his son in 1902. E.P. Hall Junior bought the newspaper in 1915, retaining ownership until 1973 when it was bought by Boone Publishing Co. On September 22, 1988, the paper was bought by News Publishing Co., before eventually being bought by the present owner, Times-Journal Inc., based in Marietta, Georgia.

=== Digitization ===
In December 2017, over 16,000 pages of the Walker County Messenger were added to the Georgia Historic Newspapers (GHN) website. The funding for the digitization was provided by Georgia HomePLACE, a project of the Digital Library of Georgia (DLG) dedicated to encouraging public library participation in other DLG programs.

== Sister publications ==
- Rome News-Tribune
- Polk Standard Journal
- Calhoun Times, formerly Calhoun Times and Gordon County News, is the official legal organ of Gordon County. Established in 1870, the newspaper is the oldest business in Calhoun and Gordon County.
- Catoosa County News, Catoosa County, Georgia

== Accomplishments ==
- In 2003, the newspaper won five awards presented by the Georgia Press Association in their 'Better Newspaper' contest. This included a 3rd place award for community service and a second place award for headlines. The photography and sports section also received praise in the contest.

== See also ==
- List of newspapers in Georgia
