= RYO =

RYO may refer to:

- Rio Turbio Airport, Argentina (by IATA code)
- Reading Youth Orchestra, an orchestra from Reading, UK
- Roll-your-own cigarette, cigarettes that are hand made
- Roll your own (poker), a term in poker jargon

== See also ==
- Ryo (disambiguation)
