= Audubon, Georgia =

Unincorporated community in Georgia, United States

Coordinates: 34°33′58″N 84°49′09″W

Audubon is an unincorporated community in Gordon County, in the U.S. state of Georgia. The community lies about 10 miles (16 km) northeast of the county seat at Calhoun.

== History ==
A post office called Audubon was in operation from 1900 until 1911. The community was likely named for John James Audubon, the American ornithologist, naturalist, and painter.
