= Colima, Georgia =

Unincorporated community in Georgia, United States

Coordinates: 34°32′35″N 84°42′26″W

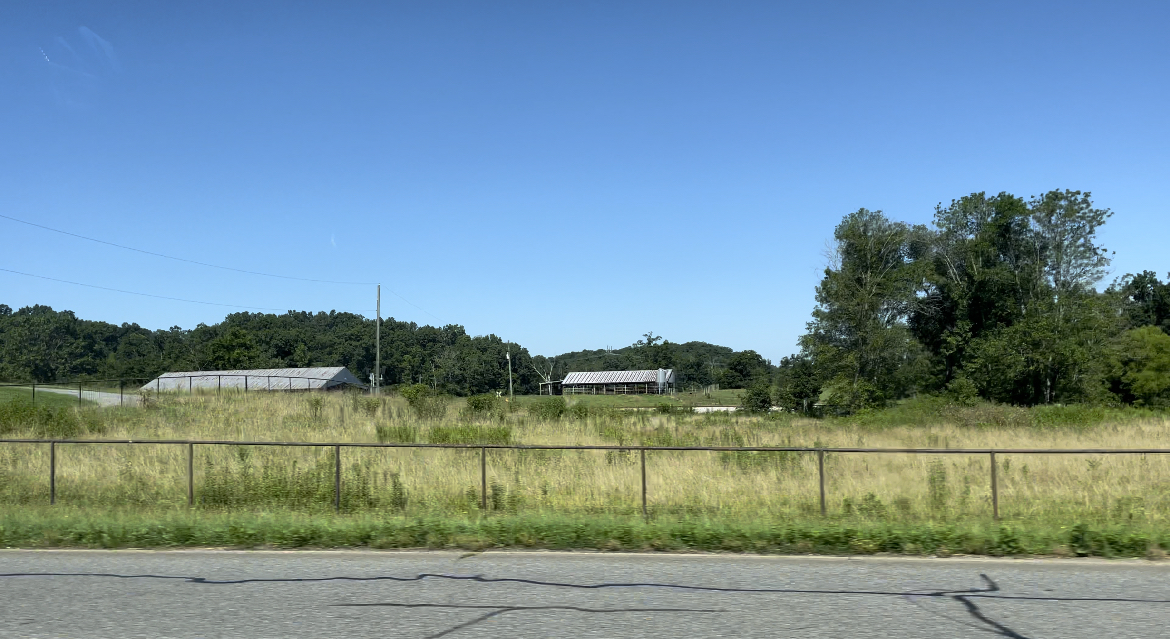
Colima, Georgia

Colima is an unincorporated community in Gordon County, in the U.S. state of Georgia.

== History ==
A post office called Colima was established in 1886, and remained in operation until being discontinued in 1909. The community was probably named after Colima, in commemoration of the Mexican–American War.
