= New Town, Georgia =

- Unincorporated community
- Location within Georgia Location within the United States
- Coordinates: 34°31′50″N 84°54′21″W
- Country: United States
- State: Georgia
- County: Gordon
- Elevation: 669 ft (204 m)
- Time zone: UTC-5 (Eastern (EST))
  - Summer (DST): UTC-4 (EDT)
- Area codes: 706/762
- GNIS feature ID: 332494

New Town (Cherokee: ᎤᏍᏔᎾᎵ, romanized: Ustanali) is an unincorporated community in Gordon County, Georgia, United States, located northeast of Calhoun. New Town is near the New Echota historic site, which was formerly part of the Cherokee Nation. Ashworth Middle School and Gordon Central High School are located in the New Town community.

New Town is the English translation of the historic Cherokee name, Ꭴꮝꮤꮎꮅ Ustanali.

== Geography ==
Alan Creek is a small stream located in New Town. It is a tributary of the Oostanaula River, part of the Coosa-Alabama-Mobile River watershed, and is located near the New Echota Historic Site.
