= Soapstick, Georgia =

Unincorporated community in Georgia, United States

Coordinates: 34°34′50″N 84°52′47″W

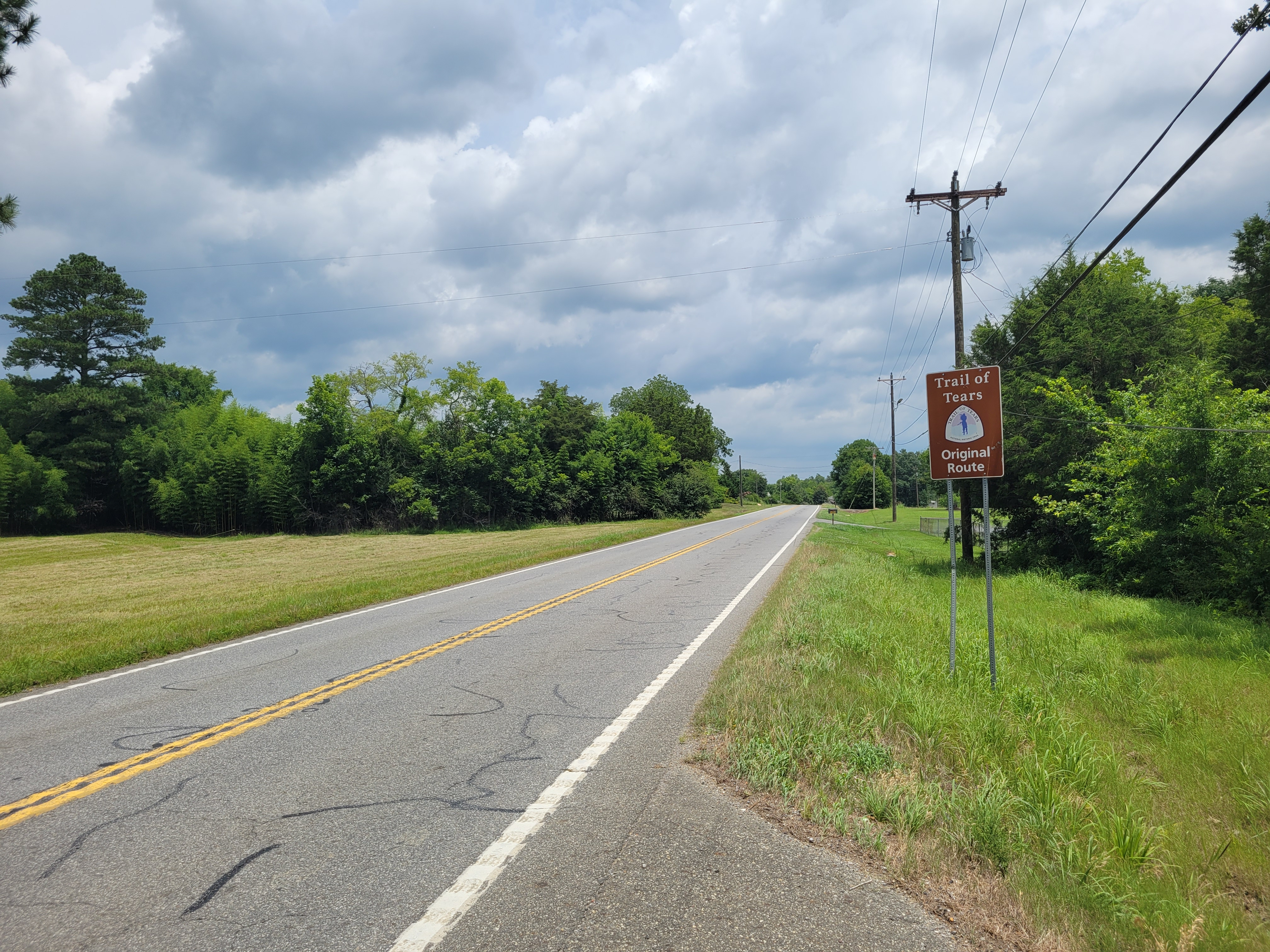
Trail of Tears Original Route

Soapstick is an unincorporated community in Gordon County, in the U.S. state of Georgia.

== History ==
Soapstick was named from the fact many of the early settlers stirred homemade batches of soap with a stick.
