= Oostanaula, Georgia =

Human settlement in Gordon County, Georgia, US

Coordinates: 34°28′53″N 85°00′52″W

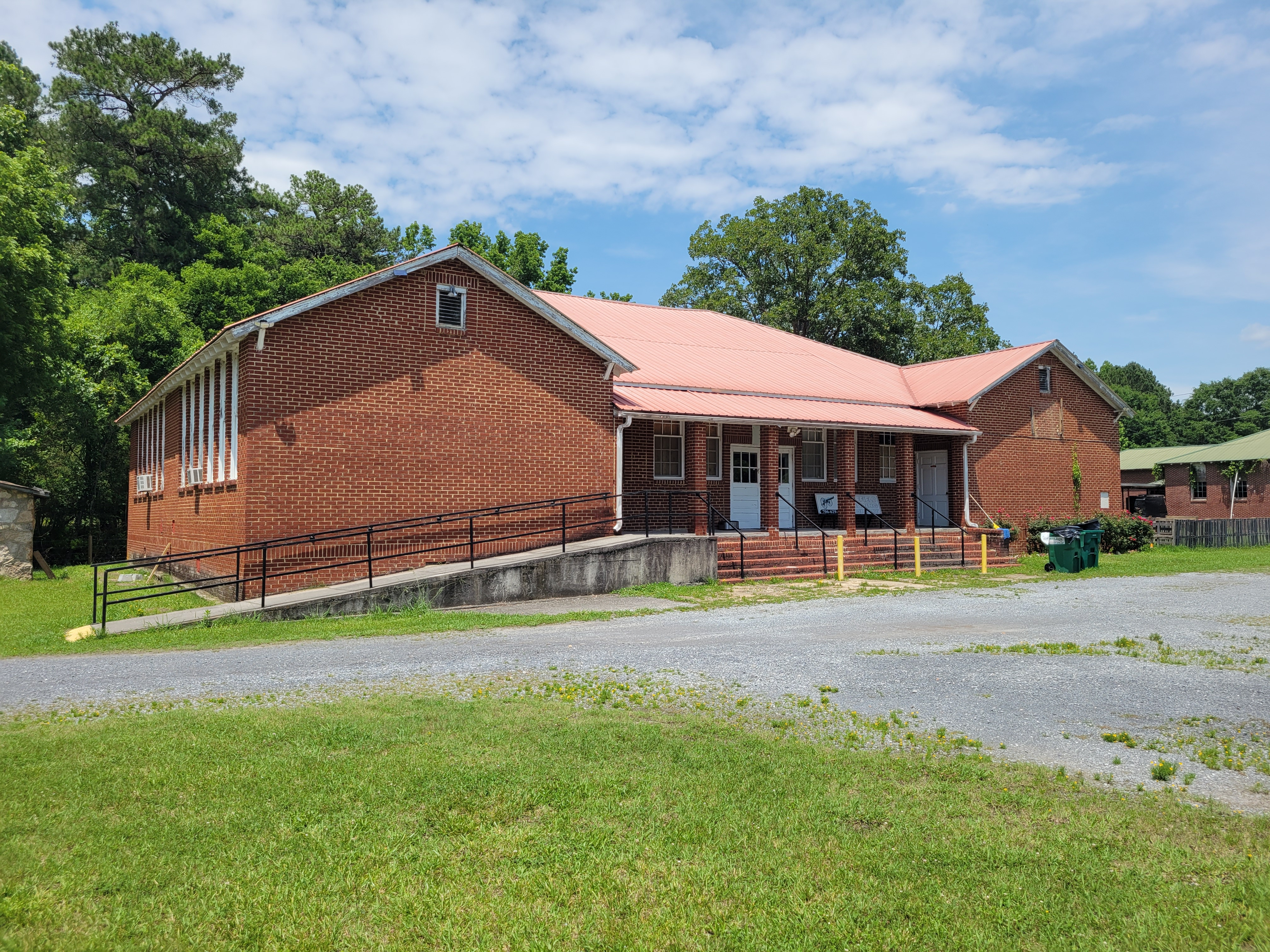
Oostanaula School

Oostanaula is an unincorporated community in Gordon County, in the U.S. state of Georgia.

== History ==
A post office called Oostanaula was established in 1881, and remained in operation until being discontinued in 1920. Oostanaula is a name derived from the Cherokee language meaning "shoally river".
