= Plainville, Georgia =

- City
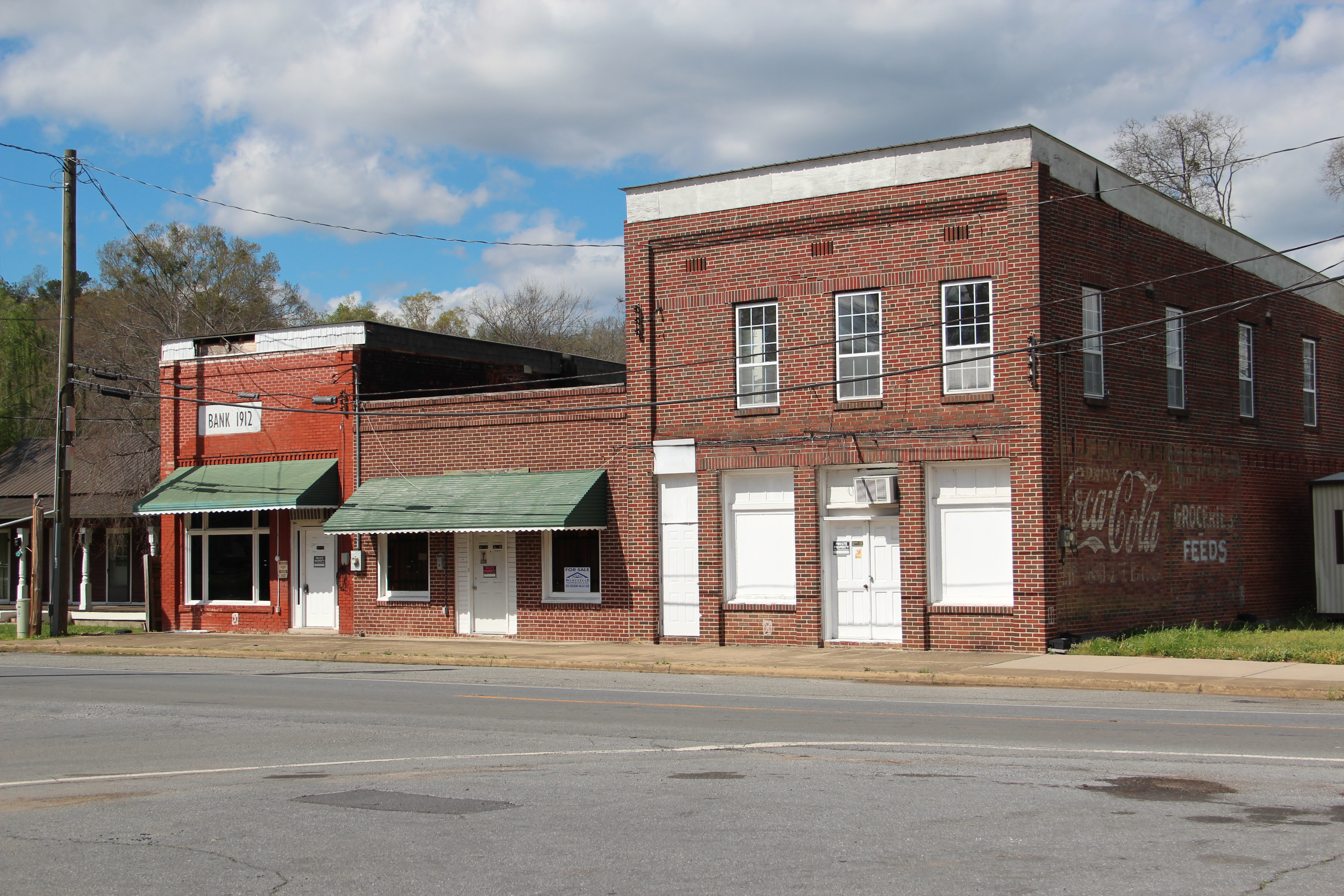
- Historic buildings in Plainville

- Location in Gordon County and the state of Georgia
- Coordinates: 34°24′15″N 85°2′15″W
- Country: United States
- State: Georgia
- County: Gordon
- Incorporated (city): January 1, 1960

Government
  - Mayor: Greg Martin

Area
  - Total: 0.72 sq mi (1.87 km^{2})
  - Land: 0.72 sq mi (1.87 km^{2})
  - Water: 0 sq mi (0.00 km^{2})
- Elevation: 679 ft (207 m)

Population (2020)
  - Total: 356
  - Density: 492.9/sq mi (190.32/km^{2})
- Time zone: UTC-5 (Eastern (EST))
  - Summer (DST): UTC-4 (EDT)
- ZIP code: 30733
- Area codes: 706/762
- FIPS code: 13-61684
- GNIS feature ID: 0332706
- Website: plainvillega.com

Plainville is a city located in Gordon County, Georgia. As of the 2020 census, Plainville had a population of 356.

== History ==
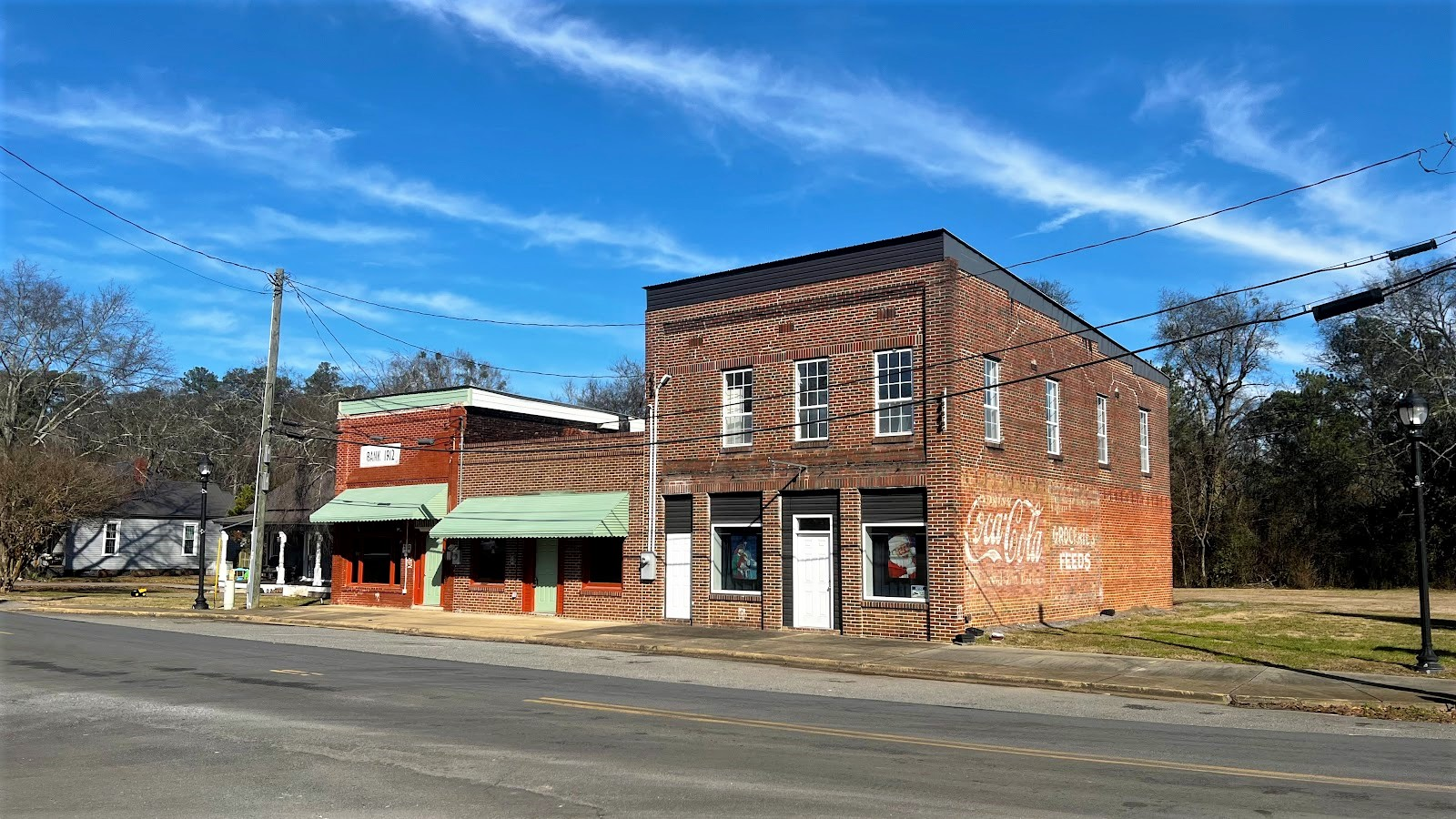
Plainville, GA Bank and General Store across from City Hall

Plainville was incorporated in 1903. The name is a transfer from Plainville, Connecticut.

== Geography ==
Plainville is located in southwestern Gordon County at 34°24′15″N 85°2′15″W (34.404212, -85.037404). The southern border of the town is the Floyd County line. Georgia State Highway 53 passes 1.5 miles (2.4 km) east of the city, leading northeast 8 miles (13 km) to Calhoun, the Gordon County seat, and southwest 14 miles (23 km) to Rome.

Plainville has an area of 0.72 square miles (1.87 km^{2}), all land.

Plainville is situated in the Ridge-and-Valley region of northwest Georgia, about 3 miles (5 km) east of a bend in the Oostanaula River, an area known as "the Bend".

== Demographics ==
Historical population
Census	Pop.	Note	%±
1910	148		—
1920	91		−38.5%
1930	124		36.3%
1940	132		6.5%
1950	142		7.6%
1960	161		13.4%
1970	192		19.3%
1980	281		46.4%
1990	231		−17.8%
2000	257		11.3%
2010	313		21.8%
2020	356		13.7%
U.S. Decennial Census

As of the census of 2000, there were 257 people, 98 households, and 68 families residing in the city. The population density was 435.5 inhabitants per square mile (168.1/km^{2}). There were 102 housing units at an average density of 172.8 per square mile (66.7/km^{2}). The racial makeup of the city was 97.67% White, 0.39% Native American, and 1.95% from two or more races. Hispanic or Latino people of any race were 1.17% of the population.

There were 98 households, out of which 37.8% had children under the age of 18 living with them, 55.1% were married couples living together, 13.3% had a female householder with no husband present, and 29.6% were non-families. 21.4% of all households were made up of individuals, and 7.1% had someone living alone who was 65 years of age or older. The average household size was 2.62 and the average family size was 3.14.

In the city, the population was spread out, with 26.8% under the age of 18, 11.3% from 18 to 24, 30.7% from 25 to 44, 19.1% from 45 to 64, and 12.1% who were 65 years of age or older. The median age was 35 years. For every 100 females, there were 107.3 males. For every 100 females age 18 and over, there were 97.9 males.

The median income for a household in the city was $28,654, and the median income for a family was $30,000. Males had a median income of $25,625 versus $20,875 for females. The per capita income for the city was $14,046. About 16.3% of families and 18.1% of the population were below the poverty line, including 31.6% of those under the age of eighteen and 16.7% of those 65 or over.
