= Hill City, Georgia =

Unincorporated community in Georgia, United States

Coordinates: 34°35′56″N 85°00′20″W

Hill City is an unincorporated community in Gordon County, in the U.S. state of Georgia.

== History ==
Variant names were "Blue Spring", "Blue Springs", and "Miller". The present name is after the hilly terrain of the area. A post office called Blue Spring was established in 1870, the name was changed to Hill City in 1909, and the post office closed in 1956.
