= Reeves, Georgia =

Unincorporated community in Georgia, United States

Coordinates: 34°27′41″N 85°00′46″W

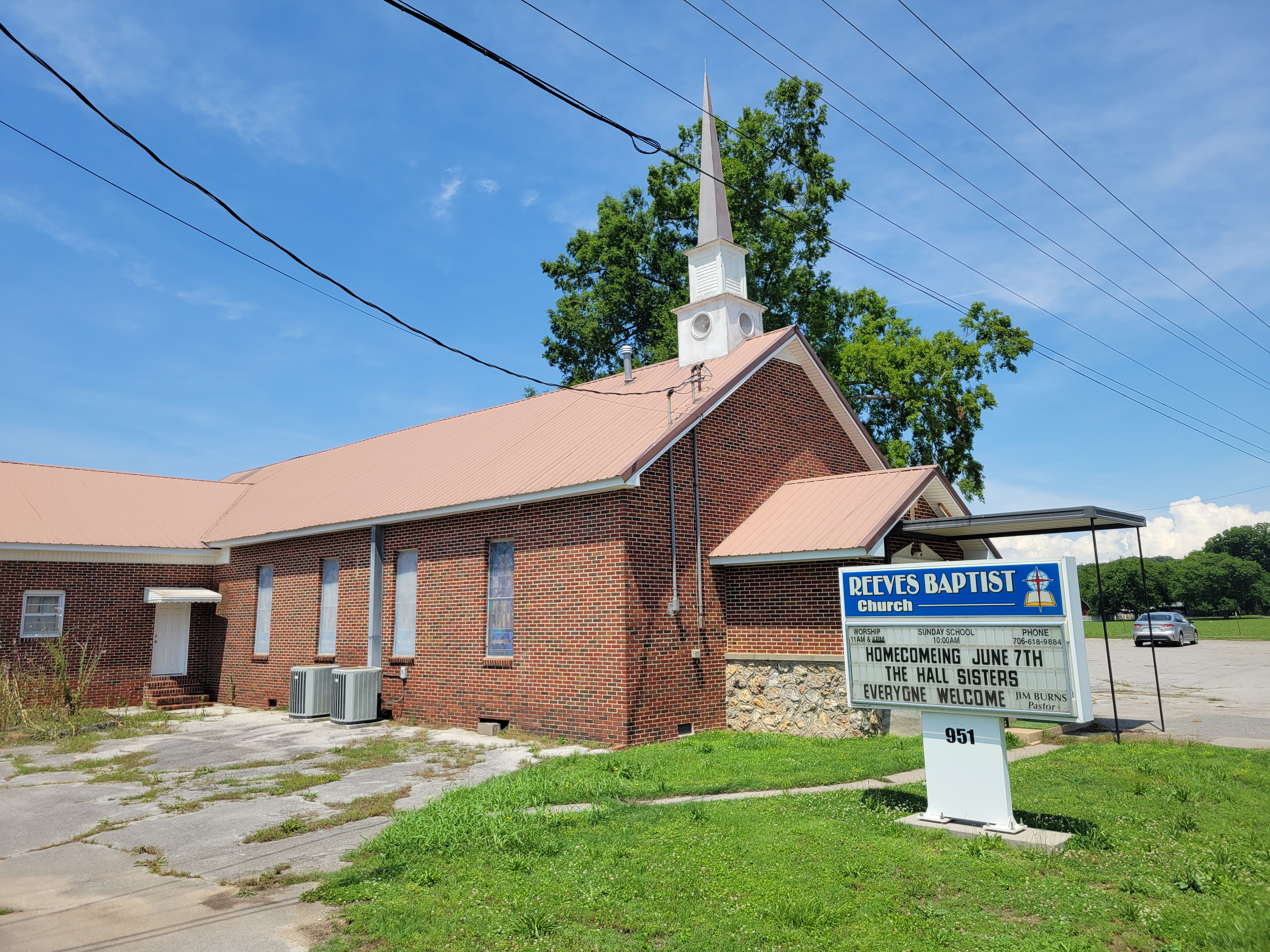
Reeves Baptist Church

Reeves (formerly Reeves Station) is an unincorporated community in Gordon County, in the U.S. state of Georgia.

Map of Reeves, GA

== History ==
A post office called Reeves Station was established in 1870, renamed Reeves in 1903, and closed in 1954. The community was named for Osborn Reeves, the original owner of the town site.
