= Ryo, Georgia =

Unincorporated community in Georgia, United States

Coordinates: 34°27′14″N 84°40′26″W

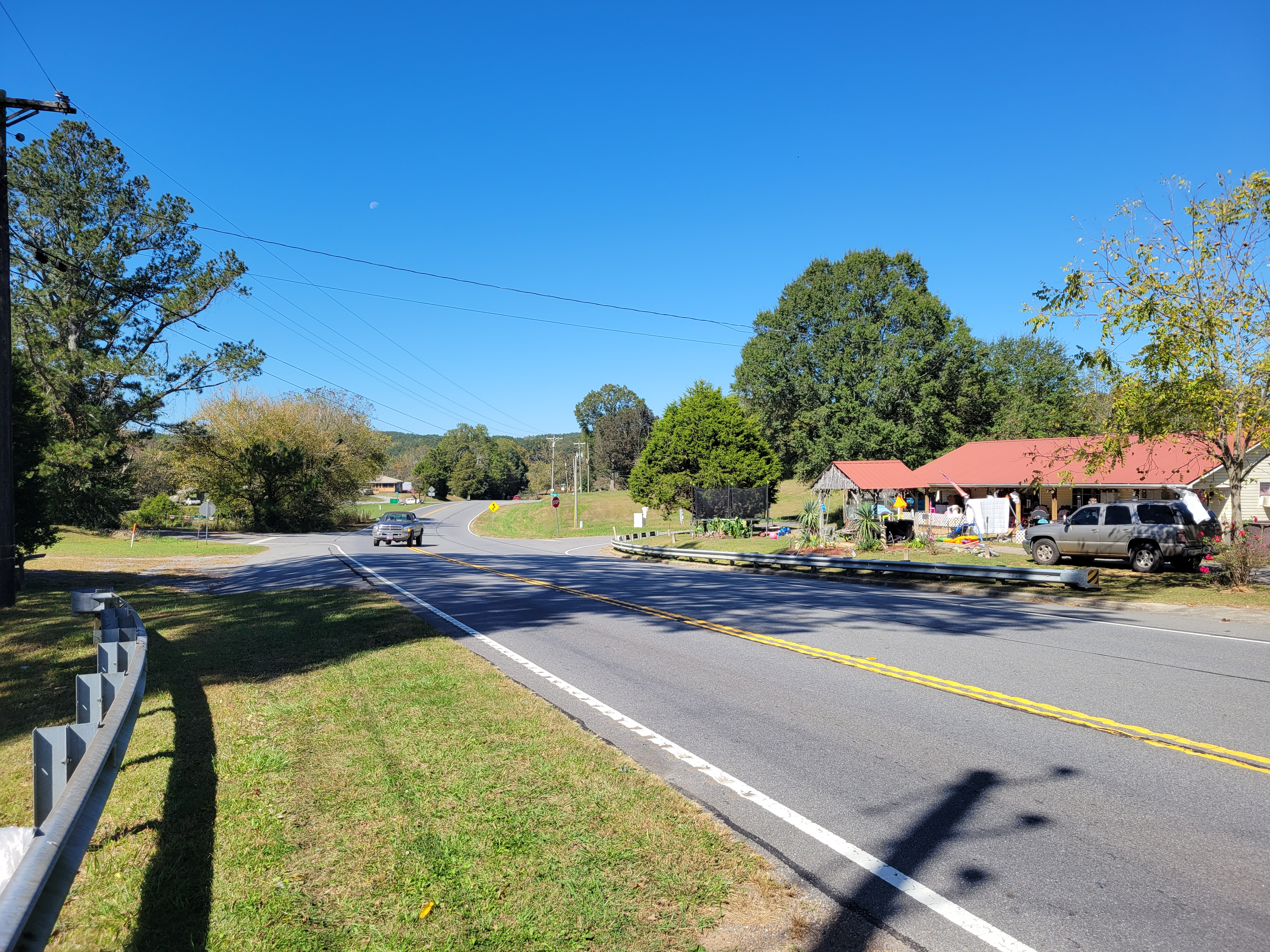
Highway 53 through Ryo

Ryo is an unincorporated community in Gordon County, in the U.S. state of Georgia.

== History ==
A post office called Ryo was in operation from 1894 until 1904. The name may be derived from Spanish, meaning "river".
