= Damascus, Gordon County, Georgia =

Damascus, Georgia
- Unincorporated community
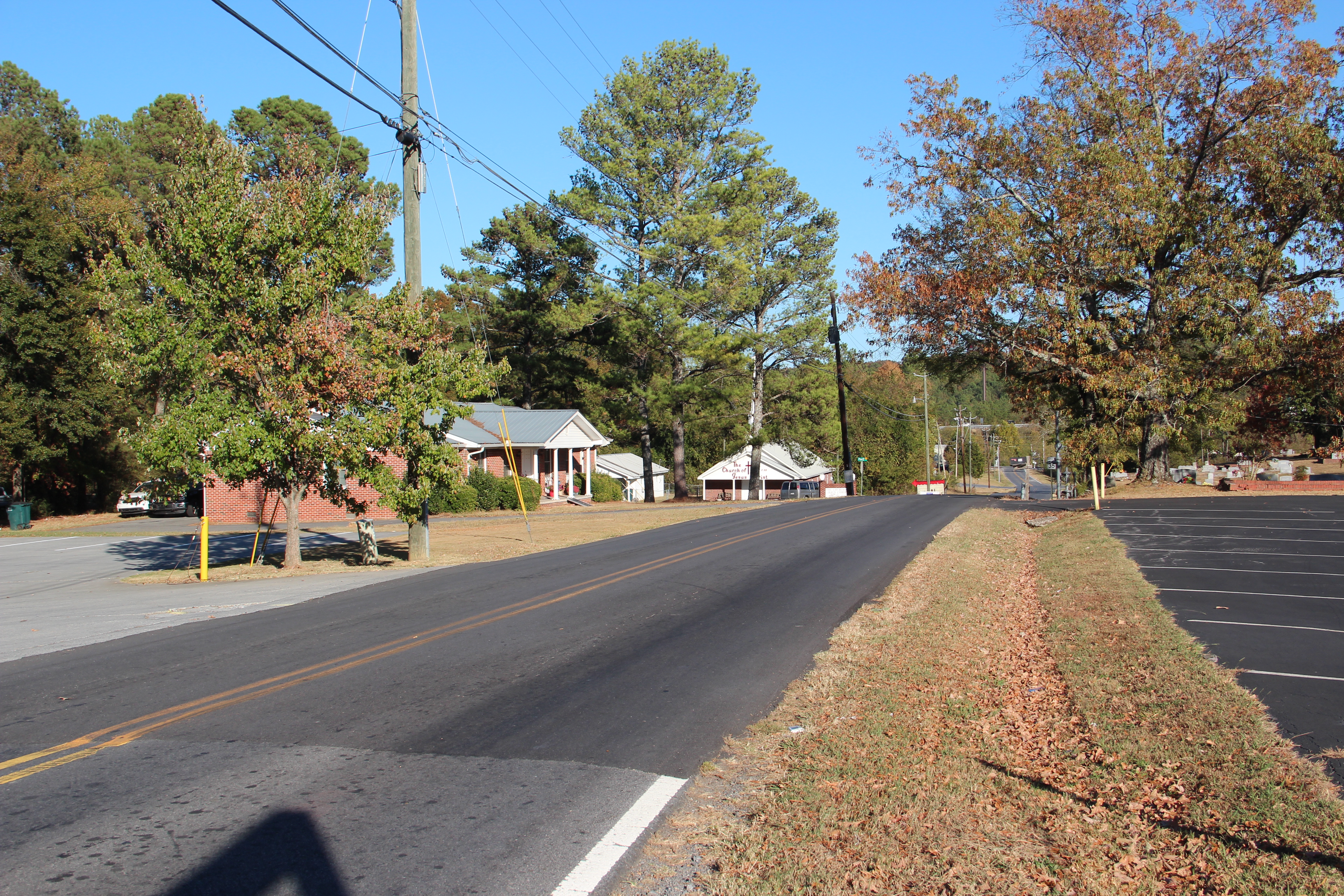
- Damascus Road in Damascus

- Location within Georgia Location within the United States
- Coordinates: 34°33′00″N 84°56′09″W
- Country: United States
- State: Georgia
- County: Gordon
- Elevation: 709 ft (216 m)
- Time zone: UTC-5 (Eastern (EST))
  - Summer (DST): UTC-4 (EDT)
- Area codes: 706/762
- GNIS feature ID: 331508

Damascus is an unincorporated community in Gordon County, Georgia, United States. Damascus is located at the intersection of I-75/SR 401 and US 41/SR 3 north of Calhoun.

It was named after the ancient city of Damascus.
