= Crane Eater, Georgia =

Crane Eater
- Unincorporated community
- Location within Georgia Location within the United States
- Coordinates: 34°13′30″N 84°52′21″W
- Country: United States
- State: Georgia
- County: Gordon
- Time zone: UTC-5 (Eastern (EST))
  - Summer (DST): UTC-4 (EDT)

Crane Eater is an unincorporated community in Gordon County, Georgia, United States.

== History ==
A post office called Crane-Eater was established in 1880, and remained in operation until being discontinued in 1906. The community was named in honor of a Cherokee chief.
