= Red Bud, Georgia =

- Unincorporated community
- Allen's Red Bud Express
- Interactive map of Red Bud, Georgia
- Coordinates: 34°31′58″N 84°48′59″W
- Country: United States
- State: Georgia
- County: Gordon
- Elevation: 669 ft (204 m)
- Time zone: UTC-5 (Eastern (EST))
  - Summer (DST): UTC-4 (EDT)
- Area codes: 706/762
- GNIS feature ID: 356490
- Other names: Redbud

Red Bud is an unincorporated community in Gordon County, Georgia, United States.

== History ==
A post office called Red Bud was established in 1852 and remained in operation until being discontinued in 1928. The community was named for a grove of red bud trees near the original town site.

On June 3, 1850, Red Bud hosted the election to determine the county seat of Gordon County. Calhoun was selected over Big Spring.
