= Oostanaula River =

River in Georgia, US

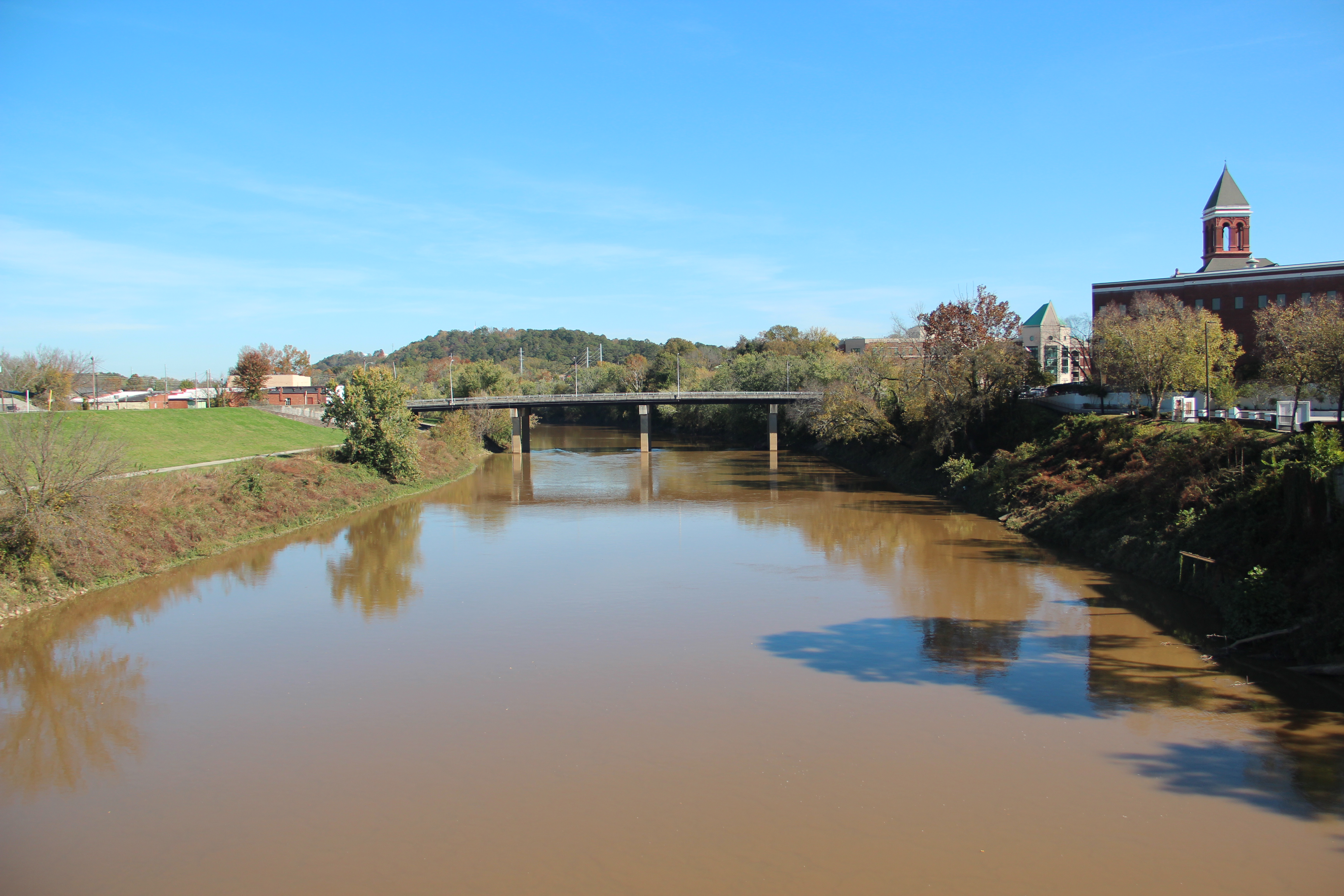
- The Oostanaula River in Rome, Georgia

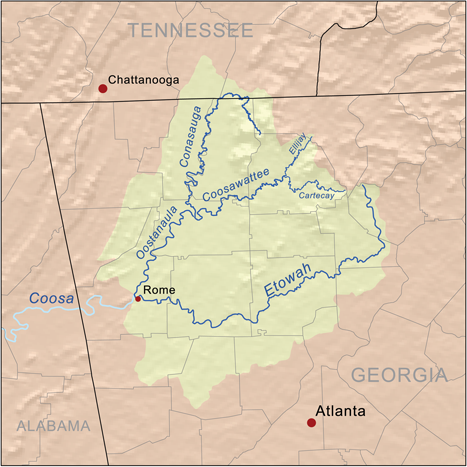

Physical characteristics
- Source
  - coordinates: 34°32′36″N 84°54′11″W
  - elevation: ~ 730 feet (220 m)
- Mouth
  - location: Rome, Georgia
  - coordinates: 34°15′15″N 85°10′36″W
  - elevation: 564 ft (172 m)
- Length: 93 miles (150 km)
- Basin size: 772 sq mi (2,000 km^{2})

The Oostanaula River (pronounced "oo-stuh-NA-luh") is a principal tributary of the Coosa River, about 49 miles (79 km) long, formed by the confluence of the Conasauga and Coosawattee in northwestern Georgia in the United States. Via the Coosa and Alabama rivers, it is part of the watershed of the Mobile River, which flows to the Gulf of Mexico.

== Etymology ==
Folklore explanations for its name state that Oostanaula is derived from a Cherokee language term meaning "rock that bars the way". Other similar explanations include "shoally river", and "a rock ledge across a stream".

== Course ==
The Oostanaula River is formed in northern Gordon County, Georgia, by the confluence of the Conasauga and Coosawattee rivers, and flows generally south-southwestwardly through Gordon and Floyd counties, past the towns of Resaca and Calhoun. It joins the Etowah River in Downtown Rome to form the Coosa River.

== Tributaries ==
- Alan Creek
- Conasauga River
- Coosawattee River
- Johns Creek
- Oothkalooga Creek

== Variant names ==
According to the GNIS, the river has also been known as:

- Estanola River
- Estanole River
- Oostenauleh River
- Oostennallah River
- Oostinawley River
- Oustanale River
- Oustanalee River
- Ustanali River

On this 1796 map the river is labelled "Eastanallee R."

== See also ==
- List of Georgia rivers
