= Sonoraville High School =

Location
- 7340 Fairmount Highway; Calhoun, Georgia 30701; United States; 34°27′01″N 84°49′47″W

Information
- Type: Public
- Established: 2005
- School district: Gordon County School District
- Principal: Amy Stewart
- Staff: 67.60 (FTE)
- Grades: 9-12
- Enrollment: 1,130 (2023–2024)
- Student to teacher ratio: 16.72
- Colors: Red and black
- Mascot: Phoenix
- Website: Sonoraville High School

Sonoraville High School is a high school located outside of Calhoun, Georgia, United States, in the unincorporated community of Sonoraville. It serves grades 9-12 and is part of the Gordon County School District. Sonoraville High School has 971 students. The school opened in 2005; it originally only served grades 9 and 10, but expanded to include all four grades over the next two years.

== Athletics ==
Sonoraville High School participates in athletics as a member of Georgia High School Association Class AA Region 7. Its mascot is the Phoenix.
