= Lewis Corner, Georgia =

Unincorporated community in Georgia, United States

Coordinates: 34°30′54″N 84°48′37″W

Lewis Corner is an unincorporated community in Gordon County, in the U.S. state of Georgia.

== History ==
The community was named in honor of the Lewis family of settlers.
