= Cash, Georgia =

- Unincorporated community
- Dews Lake

- Location within Georgia Location within the United States
- Coordinates: 34°29′23″N 84°49′07″W
- Country: United States
- State: Georgia
- County: Gordon
- Elevation: 663 ft (202 m)
- Time zone: UTC-5 (Eastern (EST))
  - Summer (DST): UTC-4 (EDT)
- Area code: 706
- GNIS feature ID: 331340

Cash is an unincorporated community in Gordon County, Georgia, United States. Cash is located on County Road 373 east of Calhoun, and between Sonoraville and Red Bud.

== History ==
A post office called Cash was established in 1889, and remained in operation until being discontinued in 1903. The community took its name from a sign at the general store that read "Cash or nothing."
