= Sonoraville, Georgia =

- Unincorporated community
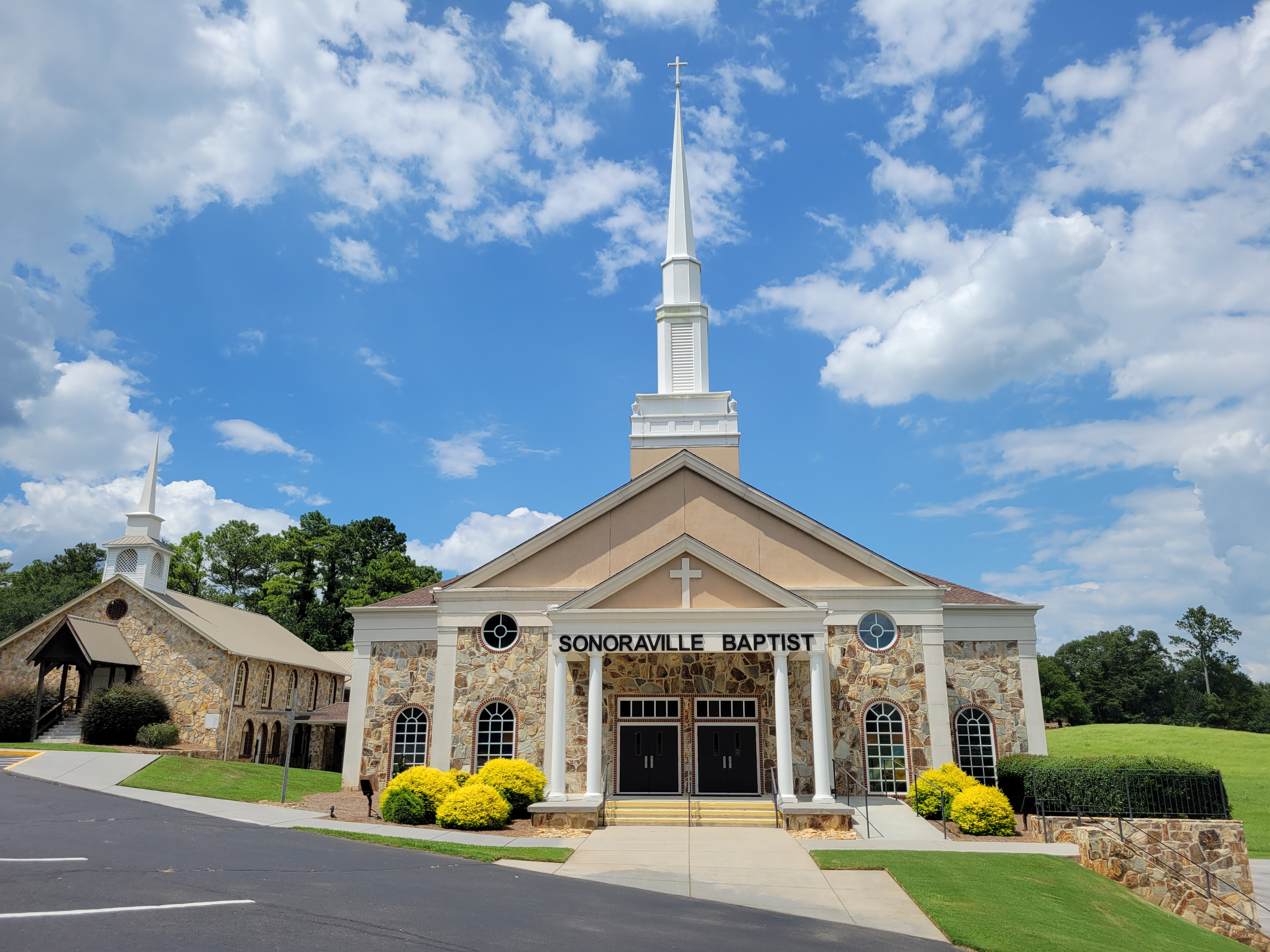
- Sonoraville Baptist Church

- Location within Georgia Location within the United States
- Coordinates: 34°26′53″N 84°48′32″W
- Country: United States
- State: Georgia
- County: Gordon
- Elevation: 718 ft (219 m)
- Time zone: UTC-5 (Eastern (EST))
  - Summer (DST): UTC-4 (EDT)
- Area codes: 706/762
- GNIS feature ID: 323220

Sonoraville is an unincorporated community in Gordon County, Georgia, United States, located seven miles outside Calhoun.

== History ==
A post office called Sonoraville was established in 1854, and remained in operation until being discontinued in 1909. The community was probably named after Sonora, in commemoration of the Mexican–American War.

== Education ==
Sonoraville High School is the community's high school; it was created in 2005 for grades 9 and 10. Within the next two years, Sonoraville became a normal high school with all grades 9–12. Amy Stewart has served as principal since 2021. The mascot is a phoenix, and the colors are red, black and white.
