= Decora, Georgia =

Unincorporated community in Georgia, United States

Coordinates: 34°34′45″N 84°51′46″W

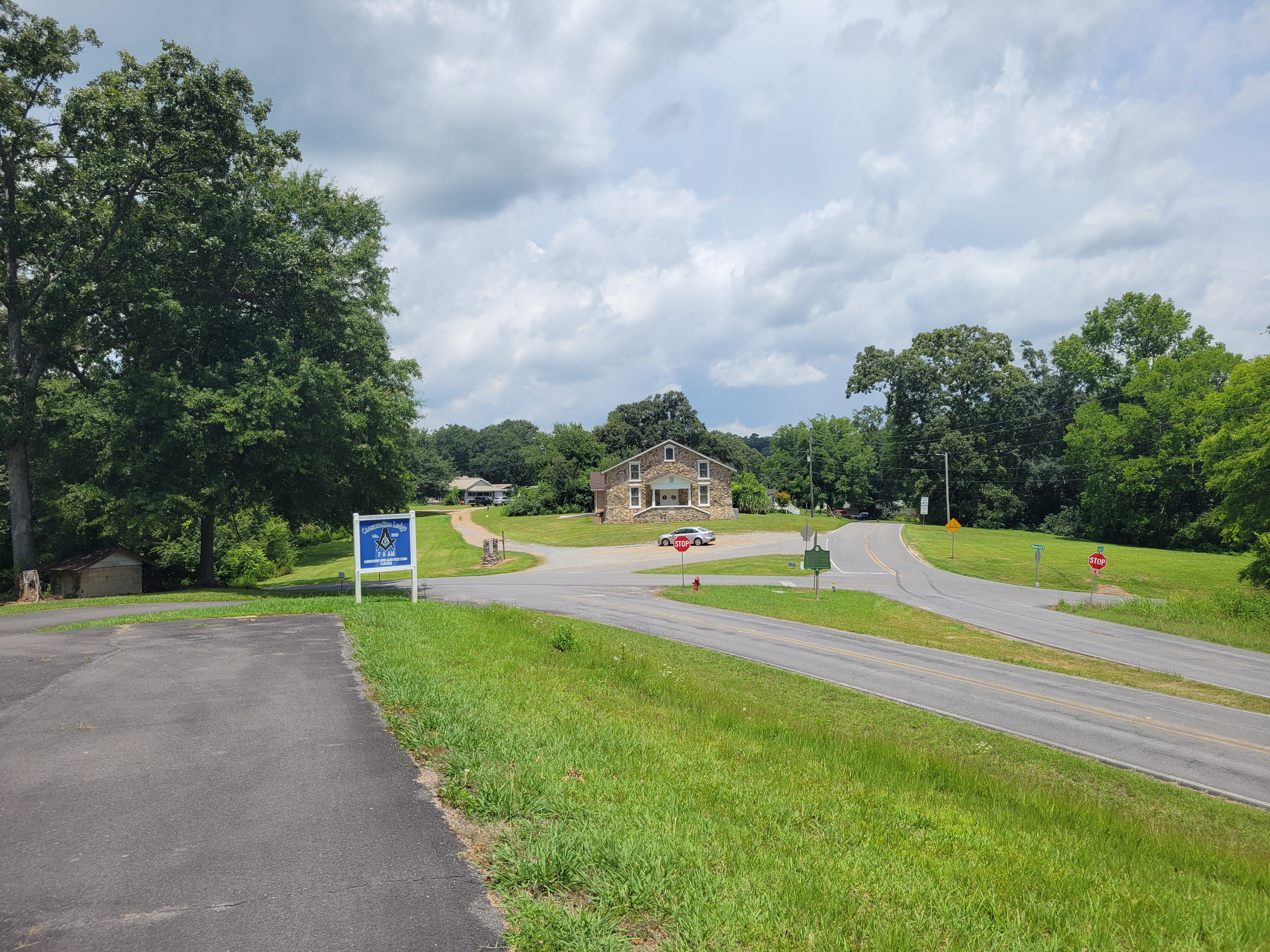
View of Decora

Decora is an unincorporated community in Gordon County, in the U.S. state of Georgia.

== History ==
A post office called Decora was established in 1888, and remained in operation until being discontinued in 1905. Decora is a name derived from Latin, meaning "good behavior".
