= McDaniels, Georgia =

Unincorporated community in Georgia, United States

Coordinates: 34°27′18″N 84°56′48″W

Abandoned house

McDaniels is an unincorporated community in Pickens County, in the U.S. state of Georgia.

== History ==
The community was named after P. E. McDaniel, the original owner of the town site. The community post office was called "McHenry". This "McHenry" post office was in operation from 1888 until 1907.
