= Fairmount, Georgia =

- City
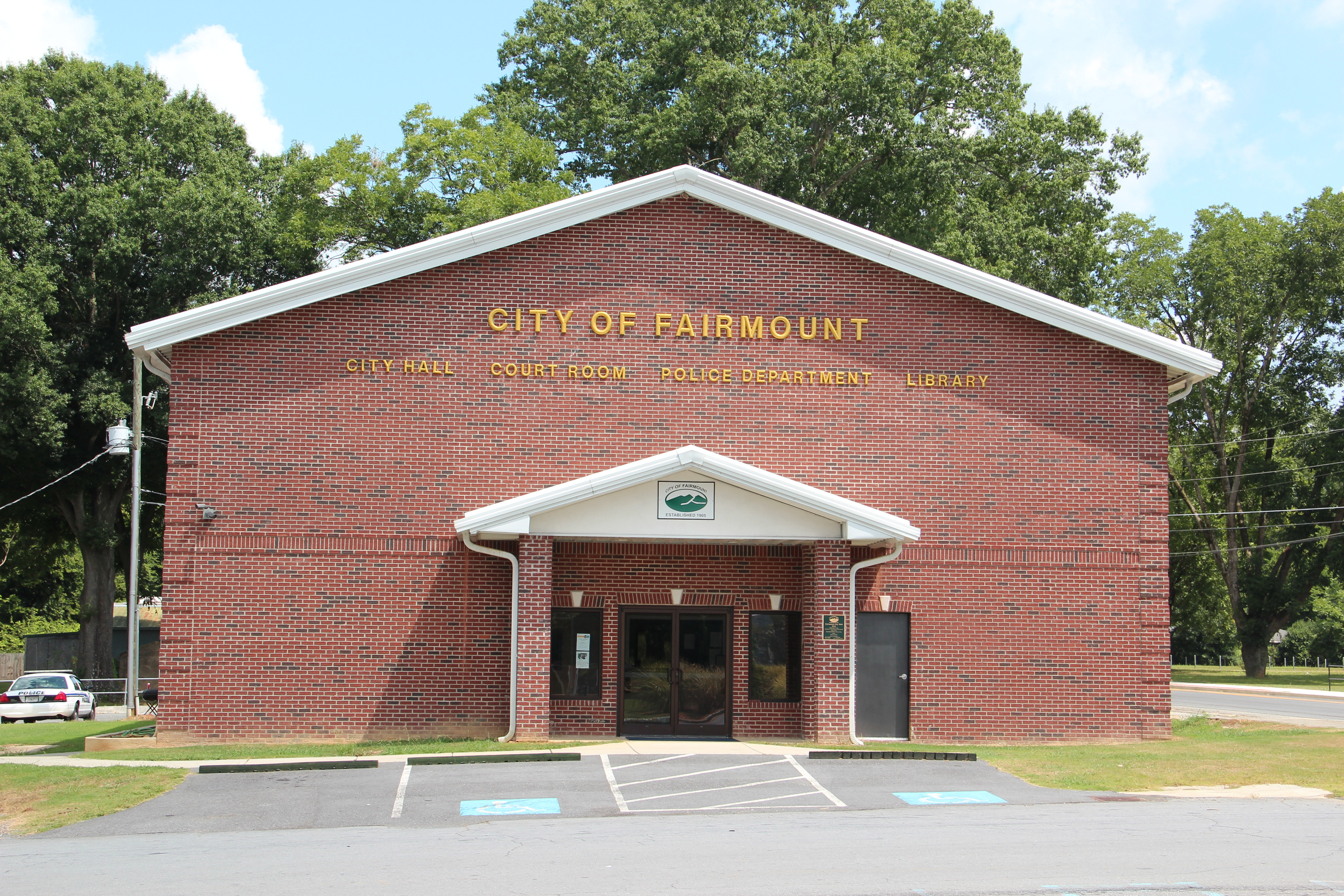
- Fairmount City Hall

- Location in Gordon County and the state of Georgia
- Coordinates: 34°26′19″N 84°41′58″W
- Country: United States
- State: Georgia
- County: Gordon
- Incorporated (town): January 1, 1897
- Incorporated (city): 1927

Area
  - Total: 1.83 sq mi (4.73 km^{2})
  - Land: 1.83 sq mi (4.73 km^{2})
  - Water: 0 sq mi (0.00 km^{2})
- Elevation: 745 ft (227 m)

Population (2020)
  - Total: 772
  - Density: 422.7/sq mi (163.22/km^{2})
- Time zone: UTC-5 (Eastern (EST))
  - Summer (DST): UTC-4 (EDT)
- ZIP code: 30139
- Area codes: 706/762 and 770/678/470
- FIPS code: 13-28492
- GNIS feature ID: 0355758
- Website: fairmountga.gov

Fairmount is a city in Gordon County, Georgia, United States. As of the 2020 census, Fairmount had a population of 772. Gordon County is home to New Echota, which was once the Cherokee Nation's capital. It was the origin of the Cherokee written language and newspaper, the Cherokee Phoenix.

The city is located near the southern end of the Blue Ridge Mountains and Chattahoochee National Forest.

== History ==
A post office called Fairmount has been in operation since 1850. The city was named after Fairmont, West Virginia.

== Geography ==
Fairmount is located in southeastern Gordon County at 34°26′19″N 84°41′58″W (34.438510, -84.699371), in the valley of Salacoa Creek, a northwest-flowing tributary of the Coosawattee River. U.S. Route 411 runs through the center of town as Salacoa Avenue, leading north 24 miles (39 km) to Chatsworth and south 21 miles (34 km) to Cartersville. Georgia State Route 53 crosses US 411 in Fairmount, leading east 18 miles (29 km) to Jasper and west 17 miles (27 km) to Calhoun, the Gordon County seat.

According to the United States Census Bureau, Fairmount has a total area of 1.8 square miles (4.6 km^{2}), all land.

== Demographics ==
Historical population
| Census | Pop. | Note | %± |
|---|---|---|---|
| 1880 | 92 | | — |
| 1900 | 191 | | — |
| 1910 | 326 | | 70.7% |
| 1920 | 497 | | 52.5% |
| 1930 | 504 | | 1.4% |
| 1940 | 474 | | −6.0% |
| 1950 | 573 | | 20.9% |
| 1960 | 619 | | 8.0% |
| 1970 | 623 | | 0.6% |
| 1980 | 842 | | 35.2% |
| 1990 | 657 | | −22.0% |
| 2000 | 745 | | 13.4% |
| 2010 | 720 | | −3.4% |
| 2020 | 772 | | 7.2% |
U.S. Decennial Census

As of the census of 2000, there were 745 people, 307 households, and 220 families residing in the city. The population density was 619.9 inhabitants per square mile (239.3/km^{2}). There were 334 housing units at an average density of 277.9 per square mile (107.3/km^{2}). The racial makeup of the city was 95.70% White, 3.22% African American, 0.27% from other races, and 0.81% from two or more races. Hispanic or Latino people of any race were 1.21% of the population.

There were 307 households, out of which 30.0% had children under the age of 18 living with them, 57.3% were married couples living together, 10.4% had a female householder with no husband present, and 28.3% were non-families. 26.1% of all households were made up of individuals, and 13.7% had someone living alone who was 65 years of age or older. The average household size was 2.43 and the average family size was 2.91.

In the city, the population was spread out, with 23.2% under the age of 18, 9.1% from 18 to 24, 26.3% from 25 to 44, 26.7% from 45 to 64, and 14.6% who were 65 years of age or older. The median age was 39 years. For every 100 females, there were 94.0 males. For every 100 females age 18 and over, there were 94.6 males.

The median income for a household in the city was $35,893, and the median income for a family was $40,568. Males had a median income of $25,833 versus $22,083 for females. The per capita income for the city was $16,508. About 5.2% of families and 7.4% of the population were below the poverty line, including 9.0% of those under age 18 and 12.8% of those age 65 or over.

== Government ==
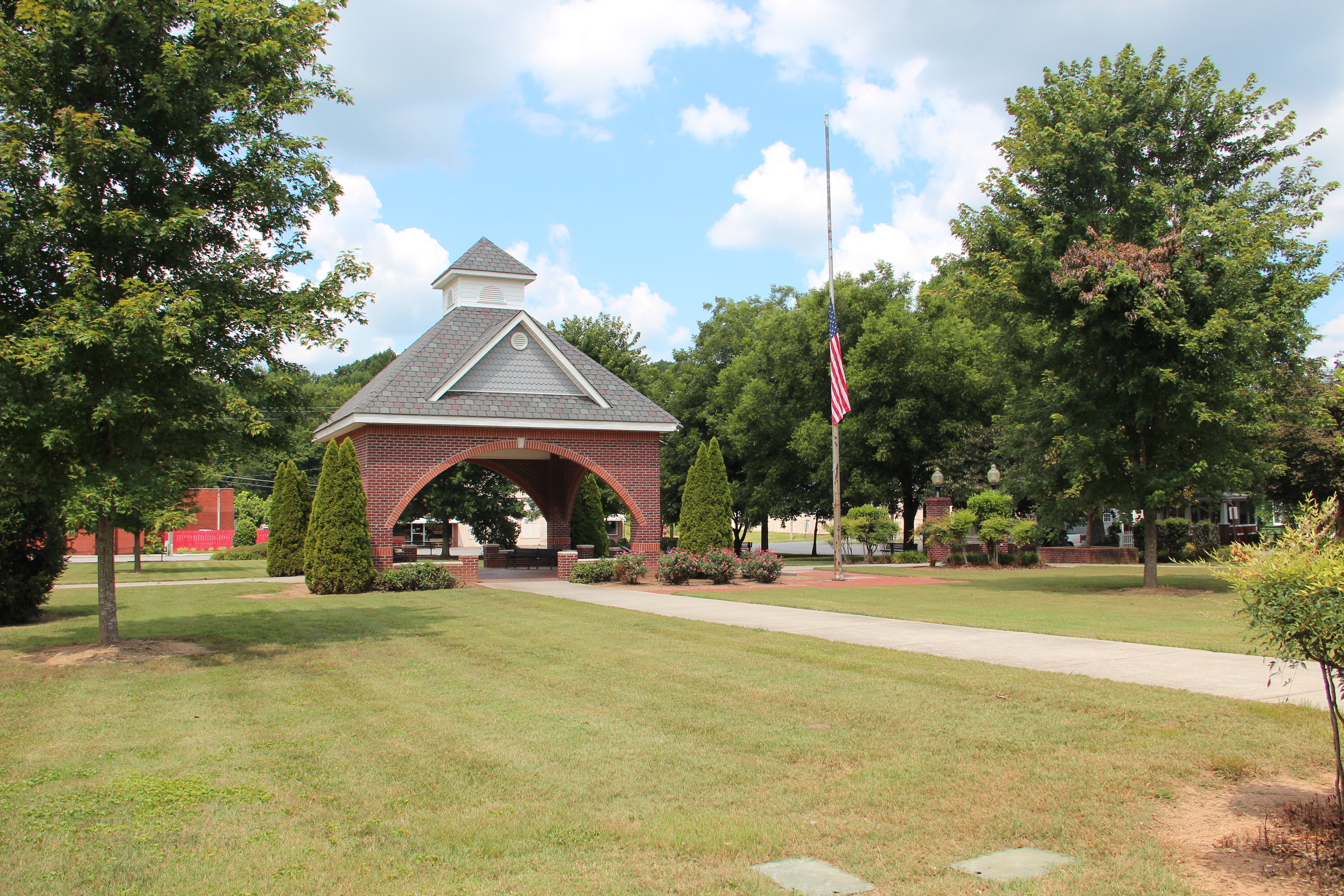
Tate Park

As of 2020, the mayor of the city of Fairmount is Steven Brannon. The city council is made up of Billy Mauldin, Steve Fain, and Junior Holsomback.

== Schools ==
- Fairmount Elementary School
- Red Bud Middle School
- Sonoraville High School
- Gordon Central High School (located in Calhoun, GA)
