= Gordon Central High School =

Location
- 335 Warrior Path NE; Calhoun, Gordon County, Georgia 30701; United States; 34°31′05″N 84°55′27″W

Information
- School district: Gordon County School District
- Principal: Dr. Amy Parker
- Teaching staff: 54.80 (on an FTE basis)
- Grades: 9–12
- Enrollment: 875 (2024–2025)
- Student to teacher ratio: 15.97
- Colors: Blue, Silver, and Black
- Nickname: Warriors
- Website: https://www.gcbe.org/o/gchs

Gordon Central High School is a grade 9–12 public high school in Calhoun, Georgia, Gordon County, United States. It enrolls approximately 850 students yearly.

== Athletics ==
Gordon Central competes in sports including football, baseball, basketball, tennis, track and field, cheerleading, golf, wrestling, soccer, softball, and cross country.

== Fine arts ==
Gordon Central has an outstanding fine arts program.

The marching band (the Blue Wave Band) regularly finishes first at competitions.

The Chorus Department is known for its award-winning history.

The school participates in literary, one-act, and academic bowl competitions.

== Notable alumni ==
- Barry Hall - NFL player; offensive lineman for the Tennessee Titans and Middle Tennessee State University
