= Interstate 59 in Georgia =

Interstate Highway in Georgia, United States

Interstate 59
- Korean War Veterans Memorial Highway
- I-59 highlighted in red

Route information
- Maintained by GDOT
- Length: 20.98 mi (33.76 km)
- Existed: August 14, 1957–present
- History: Completed in 1971
- NHS: Entire route

Major junctions
- South end: I-59 at the Alabama state line south of Rising Fawn
- SR 136 in Trenton
- North end: I-24 near Wildwood

Location
- Country: United States
- State: Georgia
- Counties: Dade

Highway system
- Interstate Highway System; Main; Auxiliary; Suffixed; Business; Future; Georgia State Highway System; Interstate; US; State; Special
← SR 58	→ SR 59
← SR 405	SR 406	→ SR 407

Interstate 59 (I-59) is part of the Interstate Highway System that runs 445.23 miles (716.53 km) from Slidell, Louisiana, to near Wildwood, Georgia, just outside Chattanooga, Tennessee. In the U.S. state of Georgia, I-59 travels 20.98 miles (33.76 km) from the Alabama state line south of Rising Fawn to its northern terminus at I-24 near Wildwood, entirely within Dade County in the far northwest corner of the state. Most of I-59's route passes through rural and mountainous terrain, with the only city it serves being Trenton. However, it is an important highway in the Chattanooga metropolitan area, being close to Chattanooga. I-59 parallels the older U.S. Route 11 (US 11) corridor with indirect access via interchanges. Beyond I-59's northern terminus into Tennessee, I-81 takes over its role as the parallel Interstate Highway for US 11, and is connected to I-59 via I-24, I-75, and I-40. For internal Georgia Department of Transportation (GDOT) purposes, I-59 carries the hidden designation of State Route 406 (SR 406). The entire route of I-59 in Georgia is known as Korean War Veterans Memorial Highway.

Of the four states which I-59 traverses, the segment in Georgia is the second-shortest, behind the Louisiana segment. I-59 was an original Interstate Highway allocated to Georgia by the Federal-Aid Highway Act of 1956. Initially conceptualized to continue a short distance into Tennessee, I-59's northern terminus was ultimately truncated south of the state lane due to mountainous terrain to the north. The first segment of I-59 in Georgia was an 8.1-mile (13.0 km) segment from Trenton to I-24, opened in 1968. The second and final segment, with a length of 11.8 miles (19.0 km), connected Trenton to the Alabama state line and was finished in 1971.

== Route description ==
Like all other Interstate Highways in Georgia, I-59 is a part of the National Highway System for its entire length in the state. It is maintained by the Georgia Department of Transportation (GDOT), along with all Interstate, U.S., and state highways in Georgia. GDOT assigns I-59 the unsigned State Route 406 (SR 406) designation for departmental purposes. The Federal Highway Administration tabulates the length in Georgia as 20.98 miles (33.76 km), and the Bureau of Transportation Statistics states that the length is 20.15 miles (32.43 km). Despite its location near a large city, I-59 carries some of the lowest volumes of traffic on any Interstate Highway in Georgia, with the highest annual average daily traffic in 2025 being approximately 25,000 vehicles at the I-24 interchange. The lowest amount was approximately 15,600 vehicles near the Alabama state line.

In Georgia, I-59 runs entirely in Dade County, which is the northwestern-most county in Georgia, in the Cumberland Plateau region and the Chattanooga metropolitan area. It is situated in a deep valley between Sand Mountain to the west and Lookout Mountain to the east. I-59 enters Georgia from DeKalb County, Alabama, into the Eastern Time Zone, running in a northeastward trajectory. Here, it parallels U.S. Route 11 (US 11). Unlike most Interstates, I-59 does not have a rest area or welcome center for travelers coming into the state. Skirting along the foothills of the mountains, I-59 makes a gradual curve to the north and runs along the slopes of Fox Mountain. It then curves slightly northwest and reaches its first interchange with Deer Head Cove Road at milepost 4. This exit provides access to the unincorporated community of Rising Fawn and a small sprinkle of development. Turning back north and then to the northeast, I-59 crosses Crawfish Creek before curving slightly northeast and then north again. The Interstate passes the Southeast Lineman Training Center as it enters the city of Trenton. Entering small amounts of development again, I-59 reaches its next interchange with SR 136 (White Oak Gap Road) for downtown Trenton, which also provides access to a local welcome center and Cloudland Canyon State Park. The Interstate then bypasses Trenton to the west and immediately crosses Town Creek.

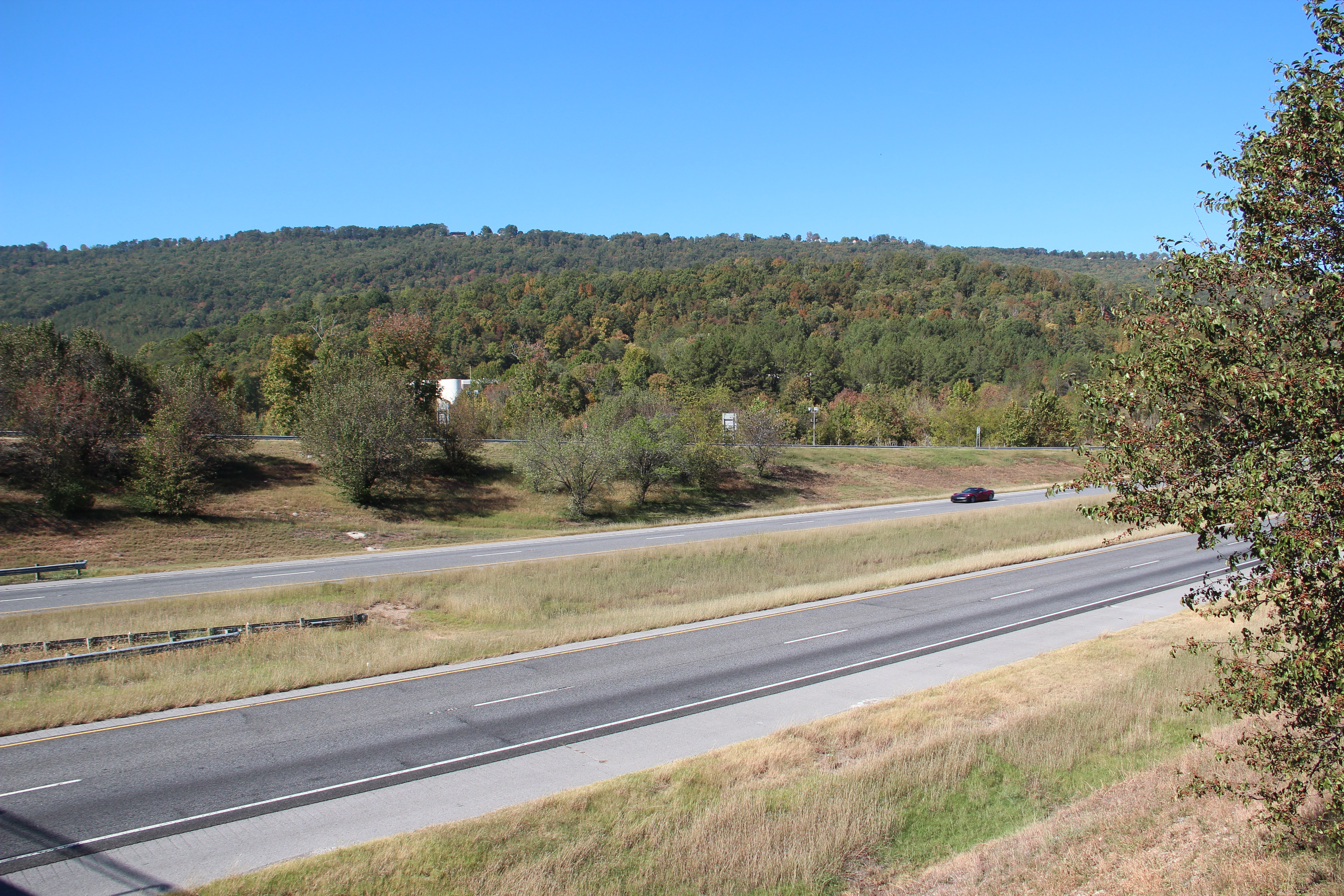
I-59 passing below Sand Mountain near Trenton

From here, I-59 turns northeast again, leaving Trenton and entering rural areas once more. It makes a brief curve north and slightly descends an incline. It crosses two streams in brief succession before turning northeast once again, curving along the slopes of Sand Mountain, and reaching its final interchange with Slygo Road, which provides access to the unincorporated community of New England. Continuing in the northeast direction, I-59 approaches Slygo Valley, paralleling Slygo Road to the east for a couple more miles whilst passing underneath Dugan Loop Road. Before long, I-59 slowly descends once again into the bottom of Lookout Valley and the foothills of Lookout Mountain. Here, it reaches its northern terminus at a full wye interchange with I-24 at the southern base of Raccoon Mountain near the Wildwood community. This interchange is also located about one mile (1.6 km) south of the Tennessee state line where I-24 briefly forays into Georgia, and is about 10 miles (16 km) southwest of downtown Chattanooga, Tennessee.

== History ==
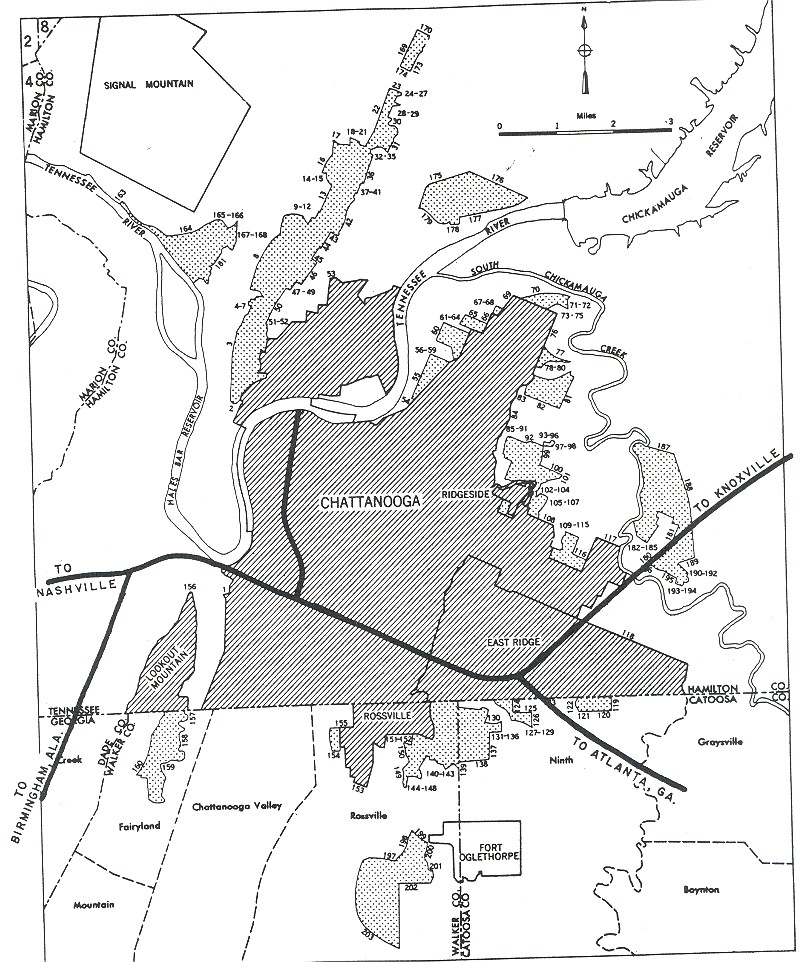
1955 proposed routing for the Interstate Highways through Chattanooga. I-59 (bottom left) continues into Tennessee and terminates with I-24 west of downtown Chattanooga in this map.

A series of trails in the valley through Dade County originating with Native Americans evolved into the road that became US 11 in 1926. Due to the mountainous terrain, the area was isolated from the rest of Georgia until 1939, when Cloudland Canyon State Park was established. A freeway between Birmingham, Alabama, and Chattanooga, Tennessee, first appeared in a 1947 plan produced by the Public Roads Administration of the now-defunct Federal Works Agency. I-59 was authorized by the Federal-Aid Highway Act of 1956, the program that created the Interstate Highway System. Its numbering was approved by the American Association of State Highway Officials on August 14, 1957.

Early concepts had the highway that became I-59 continue into Tennessee to meet what became I-24 in Chattanooga. By January 1957, Georgia and Tennessee highway officials reached an agreement for I-24 to dip into Georgia to follow a natural mountain pass and avoid traversing Raccoon Mountain or the landslide-plagued Tennessee River Gorge to the north, and for I-59 to terminate with I-24 here. This allowed I-59 to reach I-24 without crossing Lookout Mountain or continuing into Chattanooga. On January 17, 1963, the federal government announced an allocation of approximately $94 million (equivalent to $756 million in 2025) for Interstate Highway projects in Georgia. One of these projects was the stretch of I-59 from the Alabama state line to Trenton, approximately 11.38 miles (18.31 km) long. This stretch had a cost of approximately $6.3 million (equivalent to $50.7 million in 2025) and was planned to be under construction by 1965.

In July 1964, a contract was awarded to build the I-24/59 interchange. The contract for the 8.1-mile (13.0 km) section between SR 143 (now SR 136) in Trenton and I-24 was let in late October 1965. On September 10, 1968, this section opened to traffic, along with the interchange with I-24 and the section of I-24 east of this interchange into Tennessee. This raised the number of miles in Georgia's Interstate system to 612 miles (985 km) that were open to traffic. In late February 1968, a contract for the 11.38-mile (18.31 km) section between the Alabama state line and SR 143 was awarded. Emory C. Parrish, executive assistant to the state highway director, said that the section was less important than other Interstate Highways, but that they chose to build it at the time due to pressure from the Bureau of Public Roads. A contract for final work was let in late May 1970, and the section was completed and opened to traffic by January 1971, completing I-59 in Georgia. This completed I-59 between Birmingham and its northern terminus.

From January 2001 to June 2002, the interchange with SR 136 was expanded with additional turn lanes and a wider bridge. The interchange with I-24 was modified in a project between February 2002 and August 2004 that replaced the bridges and extended the auxiliary lanes to reduce merging hazards. In 2012, the Georgia General Assembly designated I-59 in the state as "Korean War Veterans Memorial Highway".

== Exit list ==
The entire route is in Dade County.

Location	mi	km	Old exit	New exit	Destinations	Notes
	0.00	0.00			I-59 south – Gadsden, Birmingham	Continuation into Alabama; southern end of unsigned SR 406 concurrency
	4.27	6.87	1	4	Rising Fawn	Access via Deer Head Cove Road; road name is unsigned
Trenton	11.43	18.39	2	11	SR 136 (White Oak Gap Road) – Trenton	To the Georgia Welcome Center and to the Cloudland Canyon State Park
	17.31	27.86	3	17	Slygo Road – New England	
	19.27– 20.15	31.01– 32.43	4	–	I-24 – Nashville, Chattanooga	Northern terminus; full wye interchange; northern end of unsigned SR 406 concurrency; old exit 4 was I-24 west; I-24 exit 167
1.000 mi = 1.609 km; 1.000 km = 0.621 mi: Concurrency terminus
