= U.S. Route 11 in Georgia =

U.S. highway in Georgia

U.S. Highway 11
- State Route 58
- US 11 highlighted in red

Route information
- Maintained by GDOT
- Length: 22.8 mi (36.7 km)

Major junctions
- South end: US 11 at the Alabama state line near Rising Fawn
- SR 136 in Trenton; SR 299 northeast of Wildwood
- North end: US 11 / SR 38 at the Tennessee state line in Chattanooga, TN

Location
- Country: United States
- State: Georgia
- County: Dade

Highway system
- United States Numbered Highway System; List; Special; Divided; Georgia State Highway System; Interstate; US; State; Special
| ← SR 10 | → SR 11 |
| ← SR 57 | SR 58 | → I-59 |

U.S. Highway 11 (US 11) in the U.S. state of Georgia is a 22.8-mile-long (36.7 km) United States Numbered Highway that travels north–south through Dade County in the northwestern part of the state. It runs concurrently with State Route 58 (SR 58) for its entire length. In Georgia, the southern end is at the Alabama state line near Rising Fawn, and the northern end at the Tennessee state line at Chattanooga, Tennessee.

== Route description ==
US 11 in the state of Georgia begins at the Alabama state line south-southwest of Rising Fawn. Here, US 11 continues into Alabama, where it is internally designated as State Route 7. It travels to the north-northeast. Almost immediately, it crosses over Red River Branch. It curves to the northeast and begins to parallel Interstate 59 (I-59). It curves back to the north-northeast and crosses over a tributary of Lookout Creek. It passes Hanna Cemetery and then travels through Rising Fawn. While there, it curves to the north-northwest and begins to parallel some railroad tracks of Norfolk Southern Railway for a short distance. It crosses over Allison Creek. It curves to the northeast and crosses over Crawfish Creek. The highway curves to the north-northeast and passes Southeast Lineman Training Center just before passing the Dade County Sports Complex. It then enters Trenton. It has a brief concurrency with SR 136. Here, it begins to parallel some railroad tracks of Norfolk Southern Railway. Then, it crosses over Town Creek. In the main part of the city, the southbound and northbound lanes go around the Dade County Courthouse. It passes Trenton Cemetery and then Primary Health Care Center – Lookout Mountain. Just after crossing over McClain Branch, it leaves Trenton. It travels through New England. Just before crossing over Squirrel Town Creek, it separates from I-59 and curve to the northeast. After curving to the east-northeast, it crosses over Pope Creek. After traveling just north of Wildwood, it crosses over the Wauhatchie Creek. After intersecting the southern terminus of SR 299, the highway travels under a railroad bridge that carries railroad tracks of CSX Transportation. It then reaches the Tennessee state line, where SR 58 ends. US 11 continues into Tennessee, where it is internally designated as State Route 38.

== History ==
The roadway that would eventually become US 11 in Georgia was established by at least 1920 as part of SR 1 from Trenton to the Tennessee state line. This was just a dirt path. By the third quarter of 1921, the roadway had been redesignated as SR 58 and extended to the Alabama state line. By the end of 1926, a segment near Rising Fawn and a segment near Wildwood had a "completed hard surface". Also, a segment from about Rising Fawn to Trenton had a "sand clay or top soil" surface. By the end of 1929, the entire highway had been designated as part of US 11. By the middle of 1930, the entire highway had a "completed hard surface".

By 1940, SR 2 was built in the Trenton area. It connected Trenton to areas to its southeast. By the end of 1946, SR 2 had been extended to the Alabama state line, thus having a concurrency with US 11/SR 58. By the end of the decade, all of SR 2 in the Trenton area had been redesignated as SR 143. By 1953, a roadway had been built to connect US 11/SR 58 with the areas west of Chattanooga. This intersection was placed near Wildwood. By the middle of 1955, this roadway had been designated as SR 299.

By 1979, SR 143 had been redesignated as SR 136.

== Major intersections ==
The entire route is in Dade County.

| Location | mi | km | Destinations | Notes |
|---|---|---|---|---|
| | 0.00 | 0.00 | US 11 south (SR 7) / SR 58 begins – Fort Payne | Alabama state line; Southern end of SR 58 concurrency, southern terminus of SR 58 |
| Trenton | 12.00 | 19.31 | SR 136 east (Lafayette Street) – LaFayette | Southern end of SR 136 concurrency |
| Trenton | 12.13 | 19.52 | SR 136 west (White Oak Gap Road) to I-59 – Chattanooga, Scottsboro | Northern end of SR 136 concurrency |
| | 21.99 | 35.39 | SR 299 north to I-24 – Jasper | Southern terminus of SR 299 |
| | 22.75 | 36.61 | US 11 north (Birmingham Highway / SR 38) / SR 58 ends – Chattanooga | Tennessee state line; Northern end of SR 58 concurrency, northern terminus of SR 58 |
1.000 mi = 1.609 km; 1.000 km = 0.621 mi: Concurrency terminus

== See also ==
U.S. Route 11
| Previous state: Alabama | Georgia | Next state: Tennessee |
