= Interstate 59 =

Interstate Highway in the southeastern US

Interstate 59
- I-59 highlighted in red

Route information
- Length: 445.23 mi (716.53 km)
- Existed: August 14, 1957–present
- NHS: Entire route

Major junctions
- South end: I-10 / I-12 in Slidell, LA
- US 49 / US 98 in Hattiesburg, MS; US 84 in Laurel, MS; I-20 from Meridian, MS to Birmingham, AL; I-359 in Tuscaloosa, AL; US 82 in Tuscaloosa, AL; I-459 near Bessemer, AL; I-65 in Birmingham, AL; I-459 at Birmingham, AL and Trussville, AL line; US 278 / US 431 in Gadsden, AL
- North end: I-24 near Wildwood, GA

Location
- Country: United States
- States: Louisiana, Mississippi, Alabama, Georgia

Highway system
- Interstate Highway System; Main; Auxiliary; Suffixed; Business; Future

Interstate 59 (I-59) is an Interstate Highway in the Southeastern United States. It is a north–south route that spans 445.23 miles (716.53 km) from a junction with I-10 and I-12 at Slidell, Louisiana, to a junction with I-24 near Wildwood, Georgia. Running a northeast–to–southwest alignment, I-59 passes through the states of Louisiana, Mississippi, Alabama, and Georgia, with slightly over half the length in Alabama.

The highway connects the metropolitan areas of New Orleans, Louisiana; Birmingham, Alabama; and Chattanooga, Tennessee, running closely parallel to the older U.S. Route 11 (US 11) corridor for the entire distance. Approximately one-third of the route, spanning 153 miles (246 km) from Meridian, Mississippi, to Birmingham, Alabama, overlaps that of the east–west I-20.

I-59 is a four-lane freeway along its entire route, other than a short stretch from Tuscaloosa, Alabama to the southern terminus of I-459 and in Birmingham, where it widens to six lanes or more. Aside from the metropolitan areas it passes through, the I-59 corridor is mainly rural in nature, although the Georgia segment is near Chattanooga, Tennessee.

== Route description ==
Lengths
	mi	km
LA	11.48	18.48
MS	171.72	276.36
AL	241.36	388.43
GA	20.67	33.27
Total	445.23	716.53

=== Louisiana ===
I-59 spans 11.48 miles (18.48 km) in Louisiana, the shortest distance in the four states through which it travels. The route begins at a partial cloverleaf interchange with I-10 (exit 267) and I-12 (exit 85) at the northeastern corner of Slidell, a city in St. Tammany Parish. From this interchange, connections are made to New Orleans and Hammond, as well as Bay St. Louis, Mississippi. Heading north, I-59 has two exits serving the town of Pearl River, where it begins a concurrency with US 11. Immediately afterward, the highway crosses the West Pearl River and passes through an interchange with Old US 11, a portion of the pre-Interstate alignment serving the Pearl River Wildlife Management Area. I-59 then travels through the Honey Island Swamp for six miles (9.7 km) before crossing the main branch of the Pearl River into Mississippi.

=== Mississippi ===
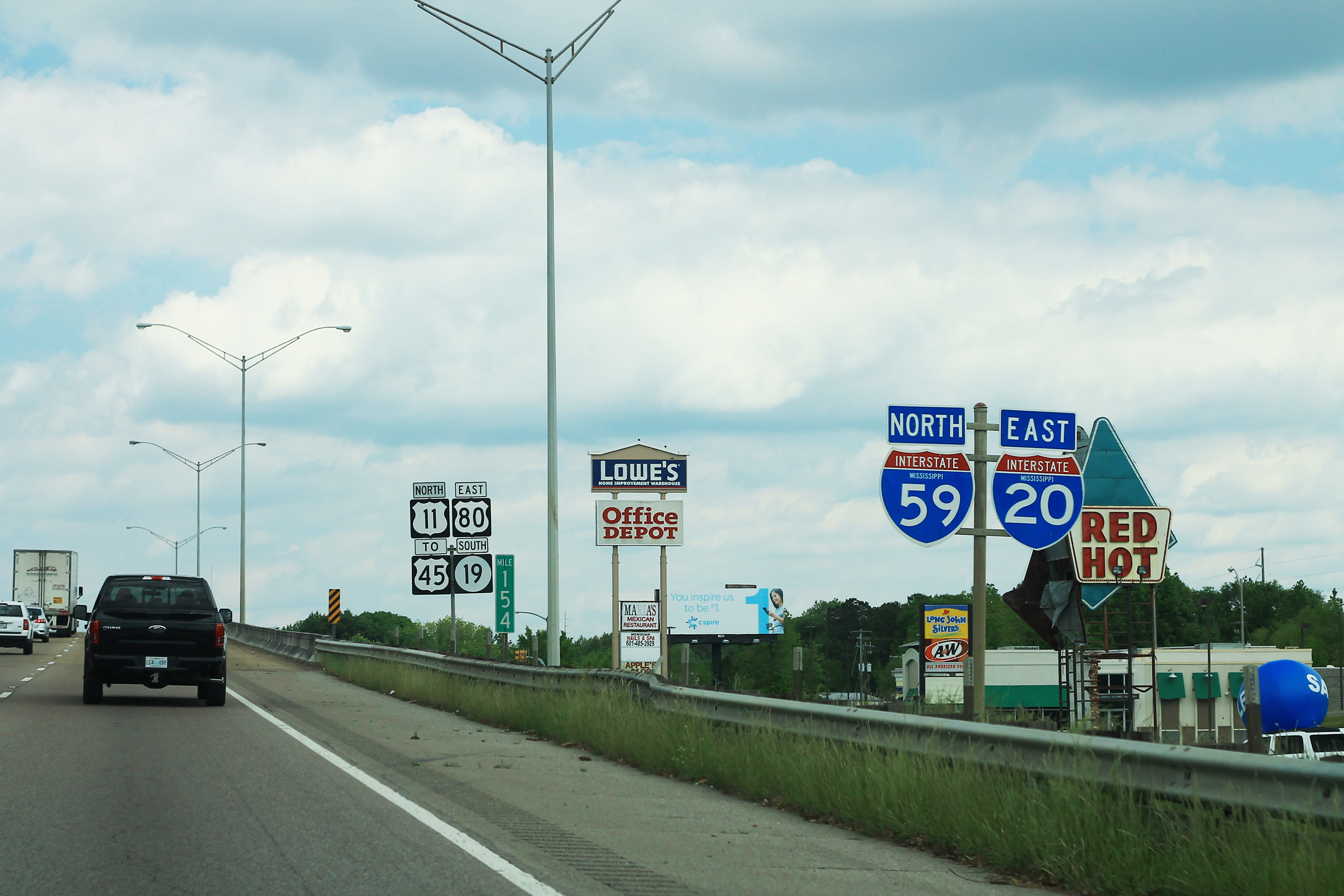
I-59 cosigned with I-20 in Meridian; other cosigned routes are listed on the shields of the next sign

In Mississippi, I-59 continues to run parallel with US 11, traversing mainly rural areas but going through or bypassing the towns of Picayune, Poplarville, Hattiesburg, Moselle, Ellisville, Laurel, and Meridian.

For its length in Mississippi, I-59 either runs concurrently with, or runs close to, US 11. Between the towns of Pearl River and Picayune, US 11 travels concurrent with I-59. The highway also has concurrencies with US 98 in Hattiesburg; Mississippi Highway 42 (MS 42) just north of Hattiesburg; US 84 and MS 15 in Laurel; and US 80, US 11, and MS 19 in the Meridian area.

Just west of Meridian, I-20 joins I-59 and these two highways continue together for 153 miles (246 km), across the border with Alabama to and through Birmingham. The exit numbers are given as those of I-59.

=== Alabama ===
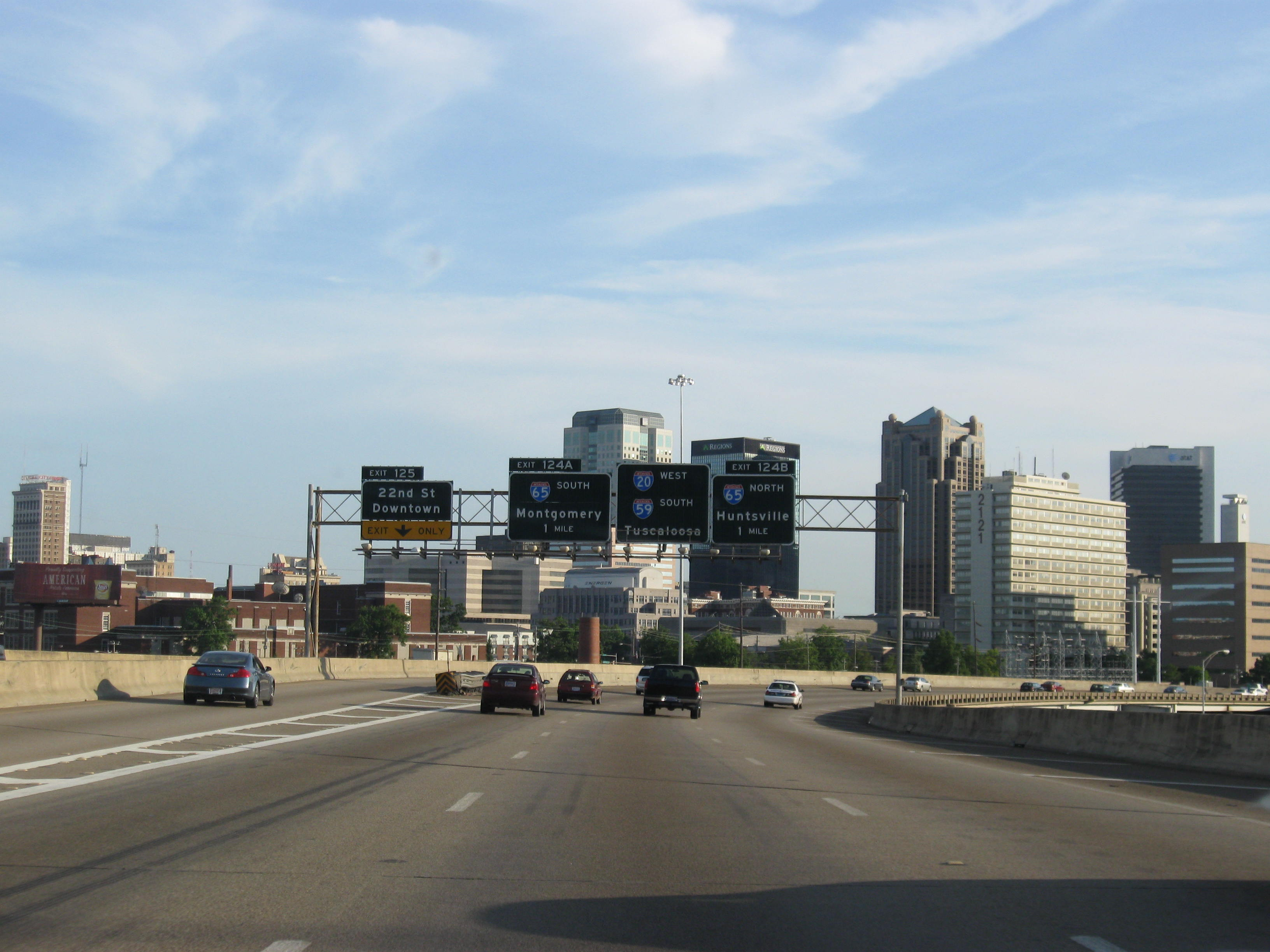
I-59/I-20 approaching I-65 in downtown Birmingham

I-59 and I-20 travel together for about 40 percent of their route through Alabama, passing northeast through Tuscaloosa before finally parting ways in eastern Birmingham. A little over half of I-59's entire length is in Alabama.

I-59/20 enter Alabama near Cuba, Alabama, passing through a rural area consisting of mostly woodlands. The first major city they meet is Tuscaloosa, where they turn eastward and have a short spur, I-359. The routes then shift northeast once again to enter the Birmingham metropolitan area, where they first pass through several suburbs of Birmingham. Here, I-59 has an auxiliary route, I-459, which serves as a bypass around Birmingham. In downtown Birmingham, the routes meet I-65 at a crossover interchange commonly known as "Malfunction Junction". Several miles later, I-20 splits off to the west near Birmingham–Shuttlesworth International Airport. Leaving Birmingham, I-59 continues northeast into the Cumberland Plateau region of the state. Access to Gadsden is provided via another spur, I-759. For the remainder of its length in Alabama, I-59 travels through rural areas in a mountain valley before entering Georgia.

=== Georgia ===
I-59 has a short trek through the northwest corner of Georgia, with only three exits before ending at I-24 several miles west of Chattanooga, Tennessee, in Wildwood. The entire route of I-59 in Georgia is named Korean War Veterans Memorial Highway. I-59's southbound control city is marked Birmingham instead of Gadsden in Georgia. For services, I-59 has no direct access to a welcome center or rest area; instead, I-59's Georgia Welcome Center is in Trenton, accessible via an interchange. Within Georgia, I-59 carries the unsigned designated State Route 406 (SR 406) for internal Georgia Department of Transportation (GDOT) purposes.

== History ==
The full length of the freeway that became I-59 was first proposed in a preliminary plan for the Interstate Highway System in 1947. It was first authorized by the Federal Aid Highway Act of 1956, which created the Interstate system. Early concepts had the freeway continue a short distance from Georgia into Tennessee to terminate in Chattanooga with the freeway between this city and Nashville, Tennessee. Due to the mountainous terrain in the area, the decision was made by early 1957 for the Chattanooga-Nashville freeway, which became I-24, to briefly dip into northwest Georgia and for I-59 to end here. The numbering was approved on August 14, 1957, along with most of the rest of the system.

Within Louisiana, I-59 was first constructed across the Pearl River as the replacement route for US 11 at St. Rose starting in 1958. The stretch southward into Slidell along with I-10 south to the Twin Bridges opened in 1965-66. I-59 in Mississippi opened initially from the Louisiana state line toward Picayune and from Hattiesburg to Laurel in 1963. The last segment in Mississippi opened on August 29, 1968. In Georgia, I-59 was completed in 1971. The last section of I-59, located in the Birmingham area, opened on June 2, 1980.

The stretch of I-59/20 running through downtown Birmingham was completed in 1973. This stretch was completely reconstructed starting in January 2019 and ending in early-2020, and was closed to all traffic during this project.

== Junction list ==
Louisiana
I-10 / I-12 in Slidell
US 11 in Pearl River. The highways travel concurrently to Nicholson, Mississippi.
Mississippi
US 98 in Hattiesburg. The highways travel concurrently through the city.
US 11 in Hattiesburg
US 49 in Hattiesburg
US 11 three times in Laurel
US 84 in Laurel. The highways travel concurrently through the city.
I-20 / US 80 in Meridian. I-20/I-59 travels concurrently to Birmingham, Alabama. I-59/US 80 travels concurrently through Meridian.
US 11 in Meridian. The highways travel concurrently through the city.
US 45 in Meridian
US 11 / US 80 near Kewanee
Alabama
Future I-85 near Cuba
US 11 / US 43 in Knoxville
I-359 / SR 69 in Tuscaloosa
US 82 in Tuscaloosa
US 11 twice in Tuscaloosa
US 11 near Tuscaloosa. The highways travel concurrently to Bessemer.
I-459 near Bessemer
US 78 in Birmingham
I-65 in Birmingham
US 31 / US 280 in Birmingham
US 11 in Birmingham
I-459 in Trussville
US 231 in Ashville
I-759 in Gadsden
US 278 / US 431 in Attalla
US 11 in Fort Payne
Georgia
I-24 near Wildwood

== Auxiliary routes ==
- I-359 in Tuscaloosa, Alabama
- I-459 in Birmingham, Alabama
- I-759 in Gadsden, Alabama
