= Dade County School District =

School district in Georgia (U.S. state)

Address
- 52 Tradition Lane Trenton, Georgia, 30752; United States
- Coordinates: 34.867201°N 85.512471°W

District information
- Grades: Pre-Kindergarten – 12
- Superintendent: Josh Ingle
- Accreditation(s): Southern Association of Colleges and Schools; Georgia Accrediting Commission
- NCES District ID: 1301590

Students and staff
- Enrollment: 2,063 (2022–23)
- Teachers: 141.40 (FTE)
- Staff: 156.50 (FTE)
- Student–teacher ratio: 14.59

Other information
- Telephone: (706) 657-4361
- Fax: (706) 657-4572
- Website: dadecountyschools.org

The Dade County School District is a public school district in Dade County, Georgia, United States, based in Trenton. It serves the communities of Trenton, Rising Fawn, and Wildwood.

== Schools ==
The Dade County School District has two elementary schools, one middle school, and one high school, all but one of which are located in downtown Trenton, Georgia in the valley, with Davis Elementary being located on Sand Mountain.

=== Elementary schools ===
- Dade Elementary School
- Davis Elementary School

=== Middle school ===
- Dade Middle School

=== High school ===
- Dade County High School
