= Georgia State Route 143 =

Highway in northern Georgia, United States

State Route 143

Route information
- Maintained by the State Highway Department of Georgia
- Length: 61.044 mi (98.241 km)
- Existed: 1937–1977

Major junctions
- West end: SR 71 at the Alabama state line west of Trenton
- I-59 / SR 406 in Trenton; US 11 / SR 58 in Trenton; US 27 / SR 1 / SR 193 in LaFayette; SR 143 Conn. northwest of Sugar Valley; US 41 / SR 3 / SR 156 / SR 53 Spur in Calhoun; SR 53 from Calhoun to Hinton; I-75 / SR 401 in Calhoun; US 411 / SR 61 in Fairmount; SR 156 from Hinton to northeast of Sharp Top; SR 108 west of Tate
- East end: SR 5 / SR 53 in Tate

Location
- Country: United States
- State: Georgia
- Counties: Dade, Walker, Gordon, Pickens

Highway system
- Georgia State Highway System; Interstate; US; State; Special
← SR 142	→ SR 144

State Route 143 (SR 143) was a state highway in the northern part of the U.S. state of Georgia. It traversed through Dade, Walker, Gordon, and Pickens counties and barely missed Whitfield County. SR 143 traversed along modern-day SR 136, SR 136 Connector (SR 136 Conn.), SR 53, Henderson Mountain Road, and SR 108. Major cities along the former route include Trenton, LaFayette, Calhoun, and Fairmount.

== Route description ==
=== Dade and Walker counties ===
SR 143 began at the Alabama state line where the roadway continued as SR 71 in that state. It then had an intersection with SR 301 in Gass in Dade County, which is located in the extreme northwest corner of the state of Georgia. After passing the unincorporated community of Gass, the route descended from about 1,600 feet (500 m) feet down to under 1,000 feet (300 m) feet above sea level via two switchback turns as it approached Trenton, the county seat of Dade County. In Trenton, the highway then met Interstate 59 (I-59) and U.S. Route 11/SR 58 (US 11/SR 58). As it passed through Trenton, SR 136 then ascended Lookout Mountain via switchbacks outside of Trenton in a southerly direction up to an elevation of about 2,000 feet (600 m) near the western border of Cloudland Canyon State Park, and cut around the state park and across the mountain into Walker County.

Just after crossing into Walker County, the route made a sharp turn to the north and descended yet again down to an elevation of about 1,000 feet (300 m), then headed back east. This section of the road is also called the Lookout Mountain Scenic Highway. SR 143 meandered in a southeasterly direction, then intersected US 27/SR 1 in LaFayette was co-signed with these two routes south through LaFayette, then split off from off and ran east in the direction of the unincorporated community of Villanow, briefly turning north and forming part of the western border of the Chattahoochee National Forest, then heading south to find passable valleys, before cutting east through the national forest area. Just west of the county line with Whitfield County, the route turned sharply south through the Johns Mountain Wildlife Management Area, then entered Gordon County in its extreme northwestern corner.

=== Gordon and Pickens counties ===
After entering Gordon County, SR 143 met the western terminus of its only special route northwest of Sugar Valley. The route then passed through the town of Sugar Valley. SR 143 crossed the Oostanaula River into Calhoun.

SR 136 entered the city of Calhoun after crossing the Oostanaula River. After entering the city, it then had an intersection with SR 156 (W Line Street). It then briefly ran concurrently with SR 53 Spur (Court Street). It then turned right onto US 41 (SR 3, Wall Street). In southern Calhoun, SR 136 ended its concurrency with US 41 and began its very long concurrency with SR 53 (Fairmount Highway) to southwest of Ludville.

After leaving SR 156 west-southwest of Cagle, it crossed Cagle Branch and turned north toward Cagle. After turning north, it passed through the unincorporated community of Cagle. After Cagle, it turned to the northeast an had an intersection wit SR 108 west of Tate. After SR 108, it turned east toward Tate. After turning east, it then met its eastern terminus at an intersection with SR 5 and SR 53 at Tate.

== History ==
=== 1920s–1940s ===
The roadway that would eventually become SR 143 was established at least as early as 1919 as part of SR 1 from LaFayette to Trenton. By the end of 1921, SR 1 west of LaFayette was shifted to the east and off its former alignment. SR 53 was indicated to be a "contingent road" from LaFayette to Calhoun, with a concurrency with SR 1 in LaFayette. By the end of 1926, a portion of SR 53 northwest of Calhoun had a "completed semi hard surface". The decade ended with SR 53's path west of Calhoun being shifted farther to the south. The segment of SR 53 that had existed from LaFayette to Villanow was redesignated as part of SR 2.

In 1930, the portion of SR 2 from approximately Naomi to Villanow had a completed semi hard surface. In February 1932, this segment's eastern end was shifted slightly to the north. In 1934, SR 2 was extended to an undetermined point northwest of LaFayette. A few years later, SR 143 was established on SR 53's former path from Vilanow to Calhoun. Later that year, SR 2 was extended farther to the northwest. Its southeast part (northwest of LaFayette) was under construction, while its northwest part had completed grading, but was not surfaced. By the middle of 1939, SR 2 was extended northwest to its intersection with SR 157. The western two-thirds of its length in this area had completed grading, but was not surfaced. Near the end of the year, SR 2 was extended north-northwest to an intersection with US 11/SR 58 in Trenton. The eastern part of this extension was under construction.

In early 1940, this last extension of SR 2 had completed grading, but was not surfaced. Around the middle of the year, the portions of SR 2 both north-northwest and east-southeast of the SR 157 intersection had a "completed hard surface". The next year, nearly the entire portion of SR 2 from just south-southeast of Trenton to just southeast of Cooper Heights had a completed hard surface. Later that year, SR 143 was designated on an eastern alignment from SR 53 east of Fairmount to SR 5 and SR 53 in Tate. By the end of 1946, SR 2 was extended to the Alabama state line. Also, its segment from LaFayette to Villanow was hard surfaced. By early 1948, all of SR 2 west-southwest of Trenton, the entire western segment of SR 143, and the eastern half of the eastern segment of SR 143, had a "sand clay, top soil, or stabilized earth" surface. The western half of its eastern segment was indicated to be "projected mileage". By the middle of 1949, SR 2 was shifted much farther to the north. Its former alignment from the Alabama state line to Villanow was redesignated as a western extension of the western segment of SR 143. A portion northwest of LaFayette was hard surfaced.

=== 1950s–1970s ===
By the middle of 1950, a portion just east-southeast of Trenton was hard surfaced. In 1953, the portion west-southwest of Trenton and the portion from Sugar Valley to Calhoun were hard surfaced. The eastern segment's portion east of the SR 156 intersection had completed grading, but was not surfaced. The next year, this last segment was hard surfaced. By mid-1955, the Gordon County segment of the western segment (from Villanow to Sugar Valley) and the portion of the eastern segment (west of the SR 156 intersection) had completed grading, but was not surfaced.

By the end of 1960, the entire western segment was hard surfaced. Nearly the entire part of the eastern segment west of the SR 156 intersection was decommissioned. By the end of 1963, the decommissioned part of the eastern segment was re-instated. In 1970, a portion of the eastern segment southeast of the SR 53 intersection was hard surfaced. In 1973, the portion of the eastern segment was decommissioned was indicated to be "under construction or projected mileage". In 1977, all of the western segment from the Alabama state line to northwest of Sugar Valley was redesignated as part of SR 136. All of the western segment from northwest of Sugar Valley to Calhoun was redesignated as SR 136 Conn. The eastern segment from its western terminus to northeast of Sharp Top was redesignated as SR 379; northeast of this point to west of Tate was redesignated as part of SR 108; and from there to Tate was redesignated as SR 108 Conn.

== Major intersections ==
This table represents SR 143's junctions in 1973.

County	Location	mi	km	Destinations	Notes
Jackson		0.000	0.000	SR 71 south – Higdon, Ala	Continuation into Alabama
Dade	Gass	2.115	3.404	SR 301 – Ider, Ala, Bryant, Ala	
Dade	Trenton	5.211	8.386	I-59 (SR 406) – Birmingham, Chattanooga	I-59 exit 2
Dade	Trenton	5.454	8.777	US 11 north (SR 58 north / Main Street) – Chattanooga	Western end of US 11 concurrency
Dade	Trenton	5.587	8.991	US 11 south (SR 58 south / Main Street) – Fort Payne	Eastern end of US 11 concurrency
Dade		12.444	20.027	SR 157 north – Lookout Mountain	Western end of SR 157 concurrency; now SR 189 north
Dade				SR 189 south – Rising Fawn	Northern terminus of SR 189
Walker				SR 157 south / Lula Lake Road north	Eastern end of SR 157 concurrency
Walker				SR 193	
Walker				SR 341 (Cove Road)	
Walker				US 27 north (SR 1 north / Main Street) – Chickamauga	Western end of US 27/SR 1 concurrency
Walker	LaFayette			US 27 south (SR 1 south) / SR 193 north – Trion, Summerville	Eastern end of US 27/SR 1 concurrency
Walker				SR 151 north – Ringgold	Northern terminus of SR 151
Walker	Villanow			SR 201 north – Tunnel Hill	Southern terminus of SR 201
Gordon				SR 143 Conn. east – Resaca	Western terminus of SR 143 Connector
Gordon	Calhoun			SR 156 (W Line Street)	
Gordon	Calhoun			SR 53 Spur south	Western end of SR 53 Spur concurrency
Gordon	Calhoun			US 41 north (SR 3 / Wall Street) / SR 53 Spur ends (Court Street ends) – Resaca	Eastern end of SR 53 Spur concurrency; western end of US 41/SR 3 concurrency; northern terminus of SR 53 Spur
Gordon	Calhoun			US 41 north (SR 3 / Wall Street) – Adairsville SR 53 north (Fairmount Highway begins/ W Belmont Drive/ E Belmont Drive) – Rome	Eastern end of US 41/SR 3 concurrency; western end of SR 53 Spur concurrency
Gordon	Calhoun			I-75 (SR 401) – Atlanta, Chattanooga	I-75 exit 129
Gordon	Sonoraville			SR 373 west – Cash, Redbud	Eastern terminus of SR 373
Gordon	Fairmount			US 411 south – Cartersville	Western end of US 411/SR 61 concurrency
Gordon	Fairmount			US 411 north – Chatsworth	Eastern end of US 411/SR 61 concurrency
Pickens	Hinton			SR 53 west / SR 156 north – Ludville, Jasper	Eastern end of SR 53 concurrency; western end of SR 136 concurrency
Pickens				SR 156 south – Sharp Top, Waleska	Eastern end of SR 156 concurrency; now SR 108 south
Pickens				SR 108 north – Jasper	Southern terminus of SR 108
Pickens	Tate			SR 5 / SR 53	Eastern terminus
1.000 mi = 1.609 km; 1.000 km = 0.621 mi: Concurrency terminus

== State Route 143 Connector ==
State Route 143 Connector
- Location: Northwest of Sugar Valley–Resaca
- Length: 6.982 mi (11.236 km)
- Existed: 1972–1977

State Route 143 Connector (SR 143 Conn.) was a connector route in Gordon County, Georgia, United States. It spanned from SR 143 northwest of Sugar Valley to US 41/SR 3 in Resaca. Today, it is known as SR 136.

The roadway that would eventually become SR 143 Conn. was established between 1963 and 1966 as an unnumbered road from SR 143 northwest of Sugar Valley to Resaca. In 1972 it was designated as SR 143 Conn., ending at US 41/SR 3. In 1977, all of SR 143 west of a point northwest of Sugar Valley and all of SR 143 Conn. were redesignated as parts of SR 136.

Major intersections
The entire route was in Gordon County.

Location	mi	km	Destinations	Notes
	0.000	0.000	SR 143 – Calhoun, Villanow, LaFayette	Western terminus
Resaca	6.527	10.504	I-75 (SR 401) – Atlanta, Chattanooga	I-75 exit 133
Resaca	6.982	11.236	US 41 (SR 3 / Battlefield Parkway) – Calhoun, Dalton	Eastern terminus
1.000 mi = 1.609 km; 1.000 km = 0.621 mi: Incomplete access
