= Crawfish Creek =

Crawfish Creek may refer to:

- Crawfish Creek (Chickamauga Creek tributary), a stream in Georgia
- Crawfish Creek (Wyoming)

== See also ==
- Crayfish Creek
