= Georgia State Route 108 =

State highway in Georgia, United States

State Route 108
- SR 108 highlighted in red

Route information
- Maintained by GDOT
- Length: 22.236 mi (35.785 km)

Major junctions
- South end: SR 20 in Sutallee
- North end: SR 53 / SR 53 Bus. in Tate

Location
- Country: United States
- State: Georgia
- Counties: Cherokee, Pickens

Highway system
- Georgia State Highway System; Interstate; US; State; Special
← SR 107	→ SR 109

State Route 108 (SR 108) is a state highway running through northwestern Cherokee County and southern Pickens County in northwestern Georgia. The route begins at SR 20 in Sutallee and ends at the intersection of SR 53 and SR 53 Business in Tate.

== Route description ==
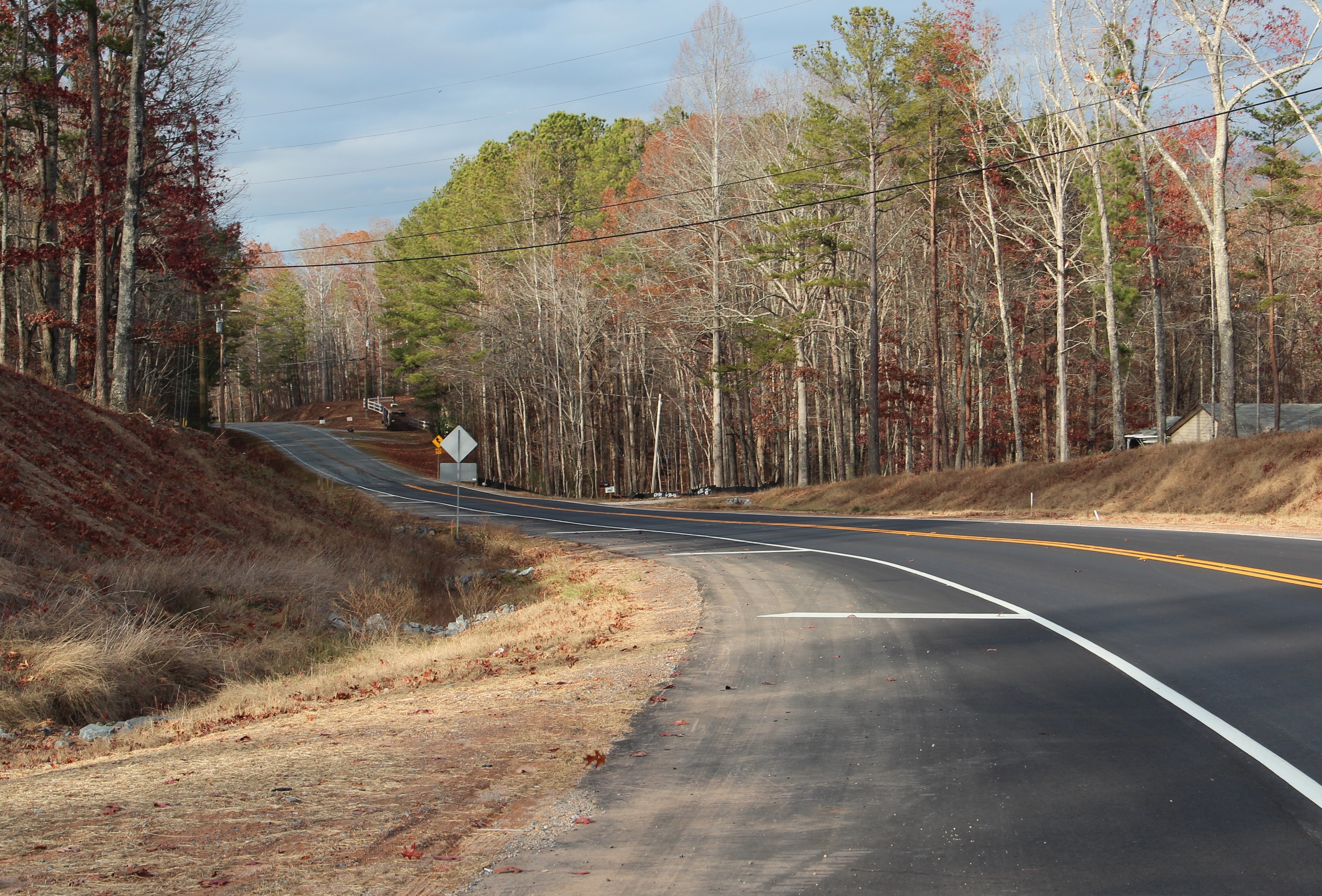
Georgia State Route 108 in Cherokee County

SR 108 begins at its intersection with SR 20 in Sutallee in west-central Cherokee County, west of Canton and north of Lake Allatoona, and right in between I-75 and I-575. The route heads north, locally known as Fincher Road, in the direction of Lake Arrowhead, before angling slightly to the northeast to pass the lake to its east, and runs into Waleska, just northeast of the Lake Arrowhead. In Waleska, SR 108 crosses SR 140 and passes Reinhardt College, which is located at the intersection of the two routes, before continuing northeast through northern Cherokee County and into south-central Pickens County, paralleling I-575 to this point.

Just inside Pickens County, the route makes a sudden turn to the southeast at its intersection with Henderson Mountain Road, nearly crosses back into Cherokee County, and then curves sharply to the north to run through the community of Cagle. In Cagle, SR 108 turns to the northeast and crosses SR 5/SR 53/SR 515, just north of where I-575 ends and these routes continue north as the Appalachian Highway. East of SR 5, the route, known as Waleska Highway in Pickens County, picks up a concurrency with SR 53 and runs east into Tate, where SR 108 terminates at its intersection with SR 53 Business, and where SR 53 continues east in the direction of Dawson County.

=== Traffic ===
The Georgia Department of Transportation average annual daily traffic (AADT) numbers for the year 2011 show a steady increase of the daily average vehicle load as SR 108 travel south to north. From its southern terminus, the average load increases from 1,380 vehicles to 1,630 vehicles per day as the route approaches Waleska, then increases more rapidly to just under 3,000 vehicles north of Waleska, with 10% of those vehicles being trucks. Number decrease just slightly again in northern Cherokee County and southern Pickens County, with averages hovering around 2,700 vehicles, then jump sharply to stay around 5,000 vehicles both west and east of SR 5.

== History ==
The first portion of the roadway that is signed as SR 108 today makes its appearance on Georgia state road maps in the middle of 1933, when a route signed as SR 108, and measuring 19.6 miles (31.5 km), ran from Jasper, at the intersection of SR 5 and SR 53 at the time, north into Cartecay in Lumpkin County, to what was then signed as SR 43, and which corresponds to SR 52 today. This route took vehicle traffic from Atlanta via SR 5 and SR 108 to the community of Tate Mountain Estates, a summer retreat planned by Colonel Sam Tate for wealthy Atlantans.

In the middle of 1941, the first roadway corresponding to today's routing of SR 108 appears, with the construction of a stretch of road, designated as SR 154, and measuring 9.2 miles (14.8 km), which ran north from what was then signed as SR 20 (and today is SR 140) in Waleska. It merged with a roadway to the south of SR 53, what is today called Henderson Mountain Road, which was designated as SR 143 at the time. SR 143 covered the portion of today's SR 108 from this intersection to Tate, the present northern terminus. From there, using SR 5 northbound for 5.0 miles (8.0 km), travelers were then able to connect to what was actually designated as SR 108 at the time.

By 1946, no additional roadway had been added to this picture; however, the route which had been designated SR 154 from Waleska, had been re-signed as SR 156, and the road intersecting what had been SR 154, and forming the southern terminus of that route, had been changed from a designation of SR 20 to the present designation of SR 140. It was 1963 before the next significant change on this route took place, when a connecting route, signed SR 108, was constructed from its intersection with SR 143 west of Tate, to Jasper, picking up and extending the original roadway signed as SR 108. This new stretch of roadway would eventually end up being removed from the state route system, and is named Refuge Road/South Main Street.

In 1969, about 6 years later, the missing portion of today's routing, from SR 20 to Waleska, was first indicated as a connecting county route on Georgia state highway maps. This county route connected to SR 156 in Waleska, which connected to SR 143, which in turn connected to SR 108, and ran through Jasper to SR 52 in Cartecay. It was then 1972 before this missing piece was integrated into the state route system, when this portion was designated as part of SR 156.

In 1979, the parts of the route that had been signed as SR 156 were re-designated as SR 108, which extended this designation from SR 20 all the way up to SR 52 in Lumkpin County. The one remaining portion of SR 143, from SR 108 to Tate, was renumbered as SR 108 Connector. At the start of 1983, SR 108 had assumed its present routing. This meant that the former SR 108 Connector had been made part of the main route, and the entire portion north of Tate into Jasper and on into Lumkin County had been removed from the state route system. Finally, until 2007, the main route of SR 53 ran through downtown Jasper, following what is today signed as SR 53 Business. In 2006–2007, this route was realigned to follow SR 5/515 south, and is then concurrent with SR 108 running east to its northern terminus in Tate.

== Major intersections ==
County	Location	mi	km	Destinations	Notes
Cherokee	Sutallee	0.00	0.00	SR 20 (Knox Bridge Road) – Cartersville, Canton	Southern terminus
Cherokee	Waleska	9.177	14.769	SR 140 (Reinhardt College Parkway) – Adairsville, Canton	
Pickens		20.042	32.254	SR 5 / SR 53 west / SR 515 (Appalachian Highway) – Canton, Ellijay, Fairmount	West end of SR 53 concurrency
Pickens	Tate	22.236	35.785	SR 53 east / SR 53 Bus. north – Dawsonville, Jasper	Northern terminus; east end of SR 53 concurrency
1.000 mi = 1.609 km; 1.000 km = 0.621 mi: Concurrency terminus

== Connector route ==
State Route 108 Connector
- Location: Cagle–Tate
- Length: 1.8 mi (2.9 km)
- Existed: 1977–1982

State Route 108 Connector (SR 108 Conn.) was a short-lived connector route of SR 108 that existed in the south-central part of Pickens County, in the north-central part of the state. The roadway that would eventually become SR 108 Conn. was established in 1941 as part of an eastern segment of SR 143 from SR 53 east of Fairmount to SR 5 and SR 53 in Tate. By the end of 1946, the eastern half of this segment had a "sand clay, top soil, or stabilized earth" surface.

In 1977, all of SR 143 from its western terminus to northeast of Sharp Top was redesignated as SR 379; northeast of this point to west of Tate was redesignated as part of SR 108; and from there to Tate was redesignated as SR 108 Conn. In 1981, SR 379 was decommissioned. In 1981, SR 5 was shifted west. Its former alignment was redesignated as SR 53 Bus./SR 53. The next year, SR 108 was shifted east, replacing SR 108 Conn.

Major intersections

The entire route was in Pickens County.

Location	mi	km	Destinations	Notes
	0.0	0.0	SR 108 – Jasper, Waleska	Western terminus
	1.8	2.9	SR 5 / SR 53	Eastern terminus
1.000 mi = 1.609 km; 1.000 km = 0.621 mi
