= Dade County High School =

Public high school in Trenton, Georgia, United States

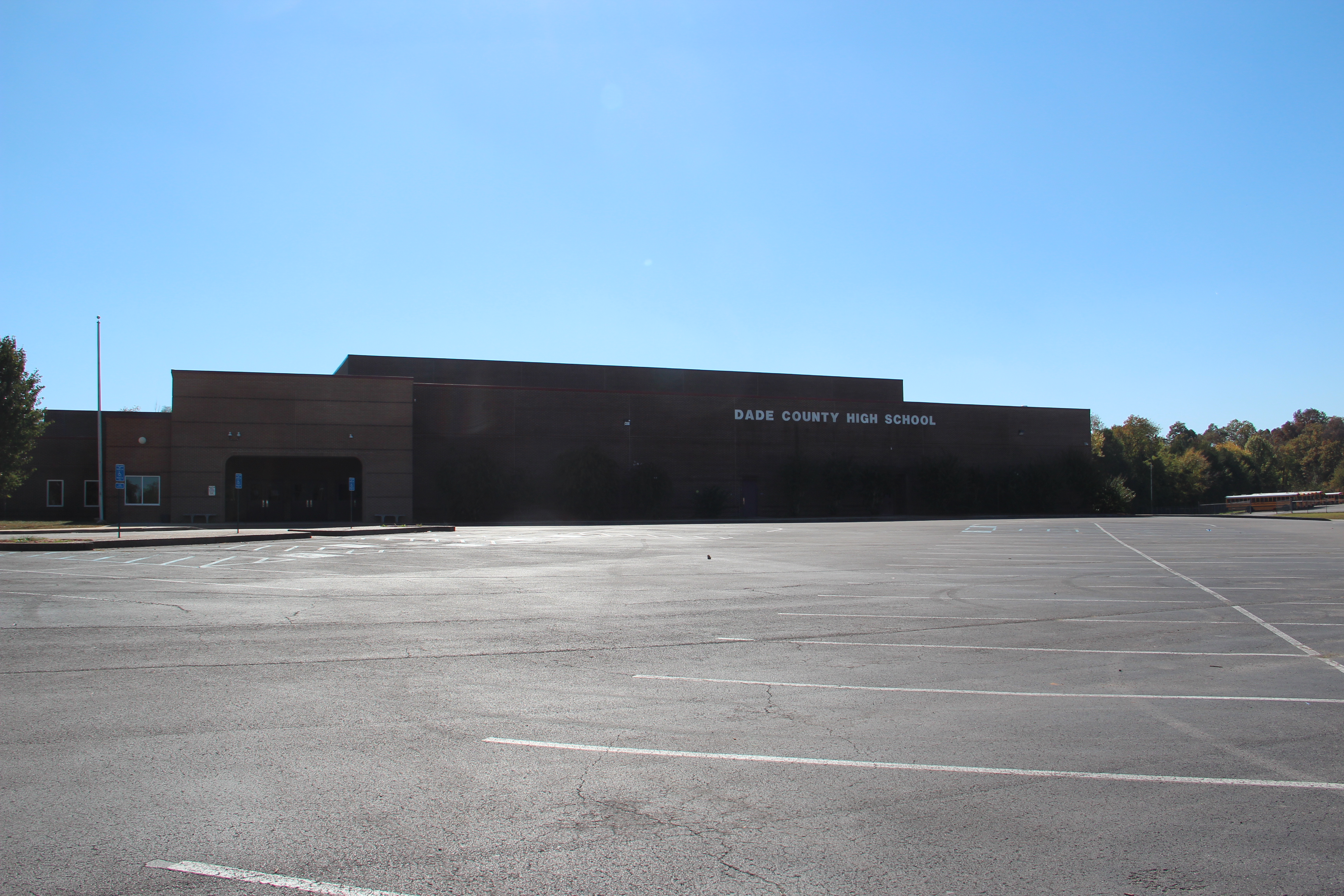
- Dade County High School in 2016

Location
- 300 Tradition Lane; Trenton, Georgia 30752; United States; 34°51′35″N 85°30′26″W

Information
- Type: Public high school
- Motto: Seeing Beyond The Mountains
- School district: Dade County School District
- NCES School ID: 130159000775
- Principal: Brent Cooper
- Teaching staff: 41.10 (FTE)
- Grades: 9–12
- Enrollment: 577 (2023–2024)
- Student to teacher ratio: 14.04
- Colors: Maroon and Gold
- Athletics conference: GHSA Class A Division I Region 7
- Mascot: Wolverine
- Nickname: Wolverines
- Website: dchs.dadecountyschools.org

Dade County High School (DCHS) is a public high school in Trenton, Georgia, United States. It is part of the Dade County School District.

Mason Weathers RC- PGA Tour
