= Slygo Valley =

Valley in Dade County, Georgia, USA

Coordinates: 34°55′45.36″N 85°29′2.24″W

Slygo Valley is a valley in Dade County, Georgia, located approximately 10 miles north of Trenton, Georgia It is at an elevation of approximately 705 feet above mean sea level. The valley is drained by Squirrel Town Creek.

Slygo Valley was named after a Native American chieftain.
