= Lineworker =

Skilled worker

Lineman
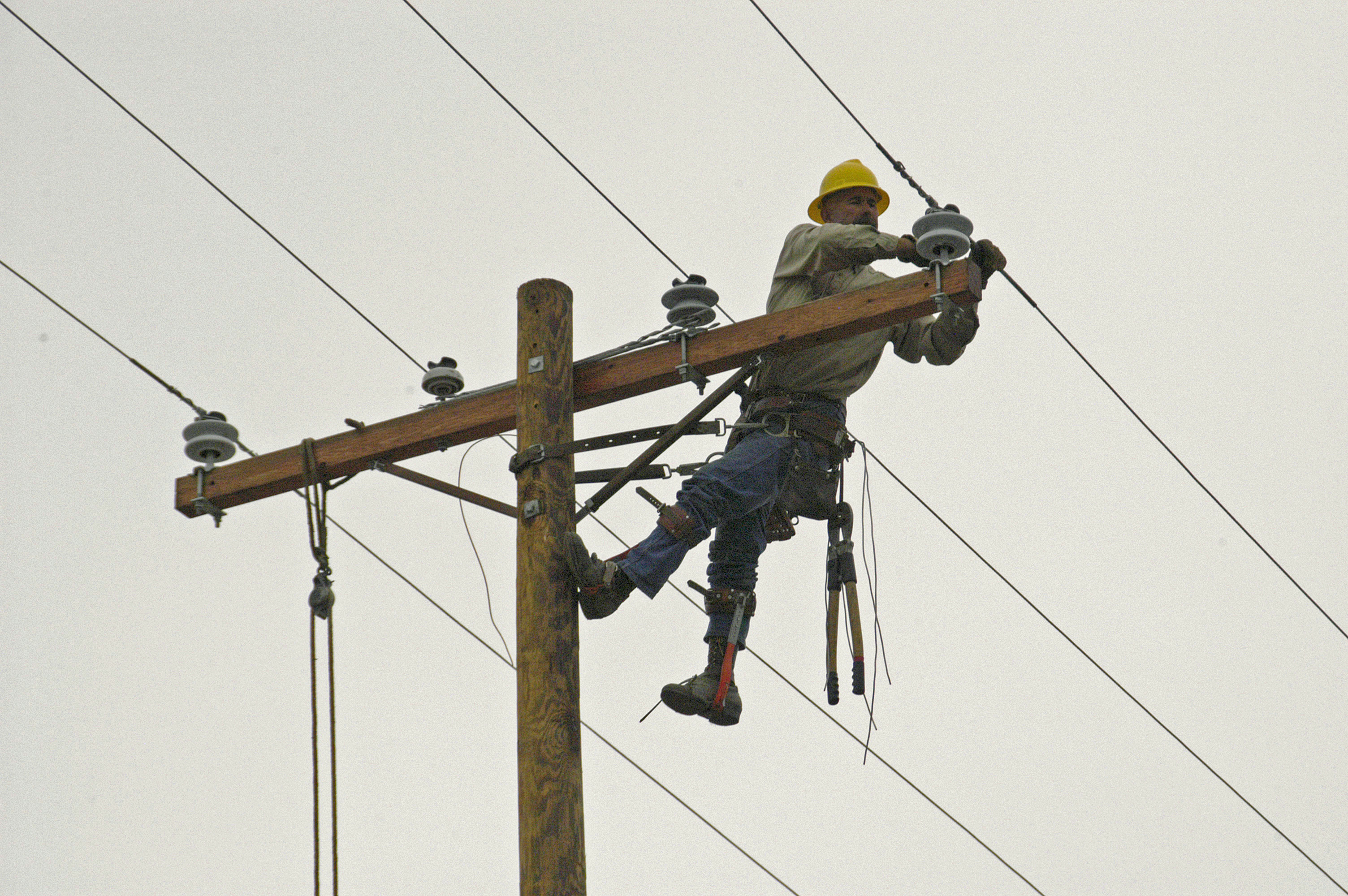
- A lineman repairing a damaged power line

Occupation
- Names: Lineworker, powerline worker
- Occupation type: Profession

Description
- Education required: Apprenticeship
- Related jobs: Electrician

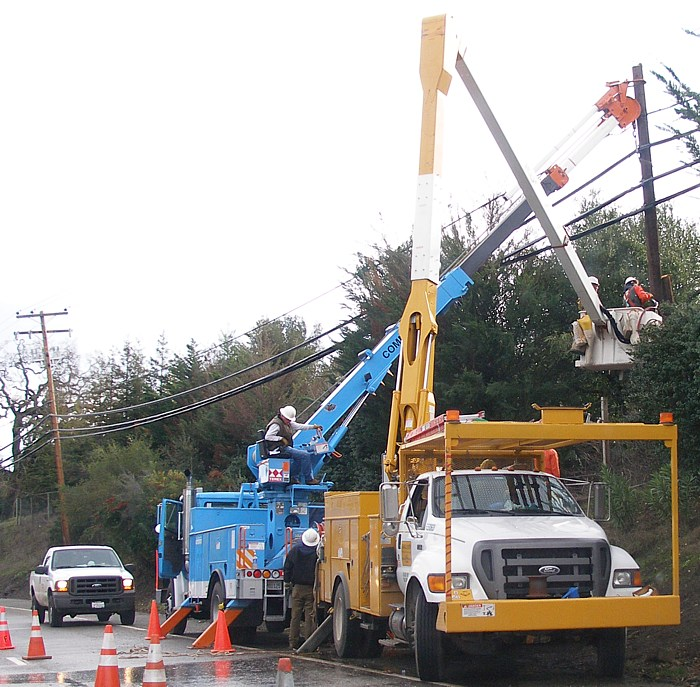
Lineworkers repairing electricity distribution lines that supply power to homes

A lineworker, also known as a lineman, powerline worker, or, in the United Kingdom, a linesman, builds and maintains the electric power transmission and electricity distribution systems that deliver electrical energy to industrial, commercial, and residential locations. A lineworker installs, maintains, and performs emergency repairs on electrical lines during events like thunderstorms, high winds, ice storms, or ground disruptions. In contrast, those who install and maintain electrical wiring inside buildings are electricians; lineworkers generally work on outdoor installations.

== History ==
The occupation had begun in 1844 when the first telegraph wires were strung between Washington, D.C., and Baltimore, Maryland, carrying the famous message of Samuel Morse, "What hath God wrought?" The first telegraph station was built in Chicago, Illinois, in 1848, by 1861 a web of lines spanned the United States and in 1868 the first permanent telegraph cable was successfully laid across the Atlantic Ocean. Telegraph lines could be strung on trees, but wooden poles were quickly adopted as the preferred method. The term lineworker was used for those who set wooden poles and strung wire. The term continued in use with the invention of the telephone in the 1870s and the beginning of electrification in the 1890s.

This new electrical power work was more hazardous than telegraph or telephone work because of the risk of electrocution. Between the 1890s and the 1930s, line work was considered one of the most hazardous jobs. This led to the formation of labor organizations to represent the workers and advocate for their safety. This also led to the establishment of apprenticeship programs and more stringent safety standards, starting in the late 1930s. The union movement in the United States was led by lineworker Henry Miller, who in 1890 was elected president of the Electrical Wiremen and Linemen's Union No. 5221 of the American Federation of Labor.

=== United States ===
The rural electrification drive during the New Deal led to a wide expansion in the number of jobs in the electric power industry. Many powerline workers during that period traveled around the country following jobs as they became available in tower construction, electrical substation construction, and wire stringing. They often lived in temporary camps set up near the project they were working on, or in boarding houses if the work was in a town or city, and relocated every few weeks or months. The occupation was lucrative at the time, but the hazards and the extensive travel limited its appeal.

A brief drive to electrify some railroads on the East Coast of the United States led to the development of specialization of powerline workers who installed and maintained catenary overhead lines. Growth in this branch of linework declined after most railroads favored diesel over electric engines for replacement of steam engines.

The occupation evolved during the 1940s and 1950s with the expansion of residential electrification. This led to an increase in the number of powerline workers needed to maintain power distribution circuits and provide emergency repairs. Maintenance powerline workers mostly stayed in one place, although sometimes they were called to travel to assist with repairs. During the 1950s, some electric lines began to be installed in tunnels, expanding the scope of the work.

== Duties ==
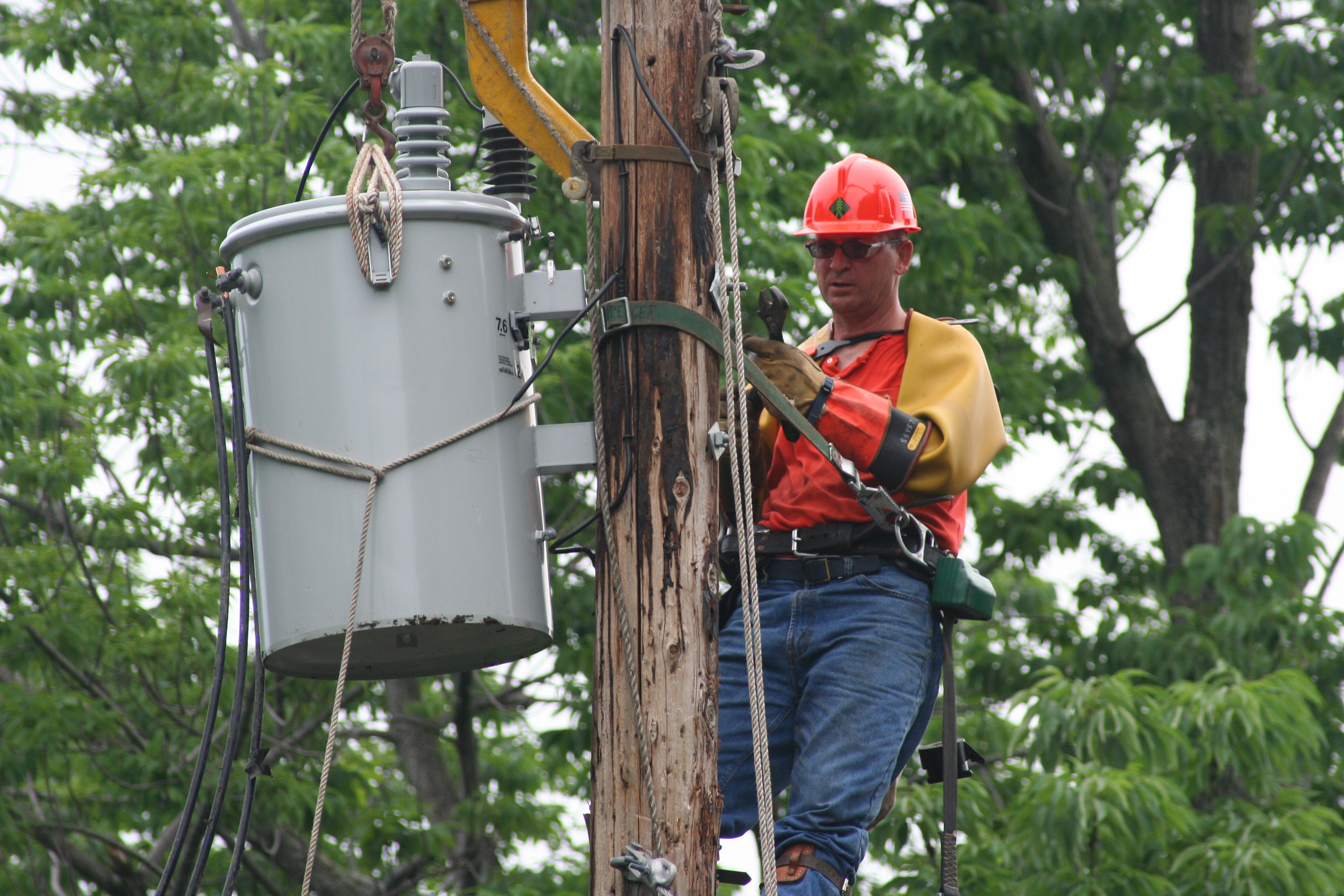
Lineworker replacing a transformer, wearing protective gear, including rubber gloves and sleeves

Powerline workers work on electrically energized (live) and de-energized (dead) power lines. They may perform several tasks associated with power lines, including installation or replacement of distribution equipment such as capacitor banks, distribution transformers on poles, insulators and fuses. These duties include the use of ropes, knots, and lifting equipment. These tasks may have to be performed with primitive manual tools where accessibility is limited. Such conditions are common in rural or mountainous areas that are inaccessible to trucks.

High-voltage transmission lines can be worked on live with proper setups. The lineworker must be isolated from the ground. The lineworker wears special conductive clothing that is connected to the live power line, at which point the line and the lineworker are at the same potential, allowing the lineworker to handle the wire. The lineworker may still be electrocuted if they complete an electrical circuit, for example by handling both ends of a broken conductor. Such work is often done by helicopter-trained power line workers. Isolated line work is only used for transmission-level voltages and sometimes for the higher distribution voltages. Live-wire work is common on low-voltage distribution systems in the UK and Australia, as all linesmen are trained to work "live". Live-wire work on high-voltage distribution systems in the UK and Australia is carried out by specialist teams.

== Training ==
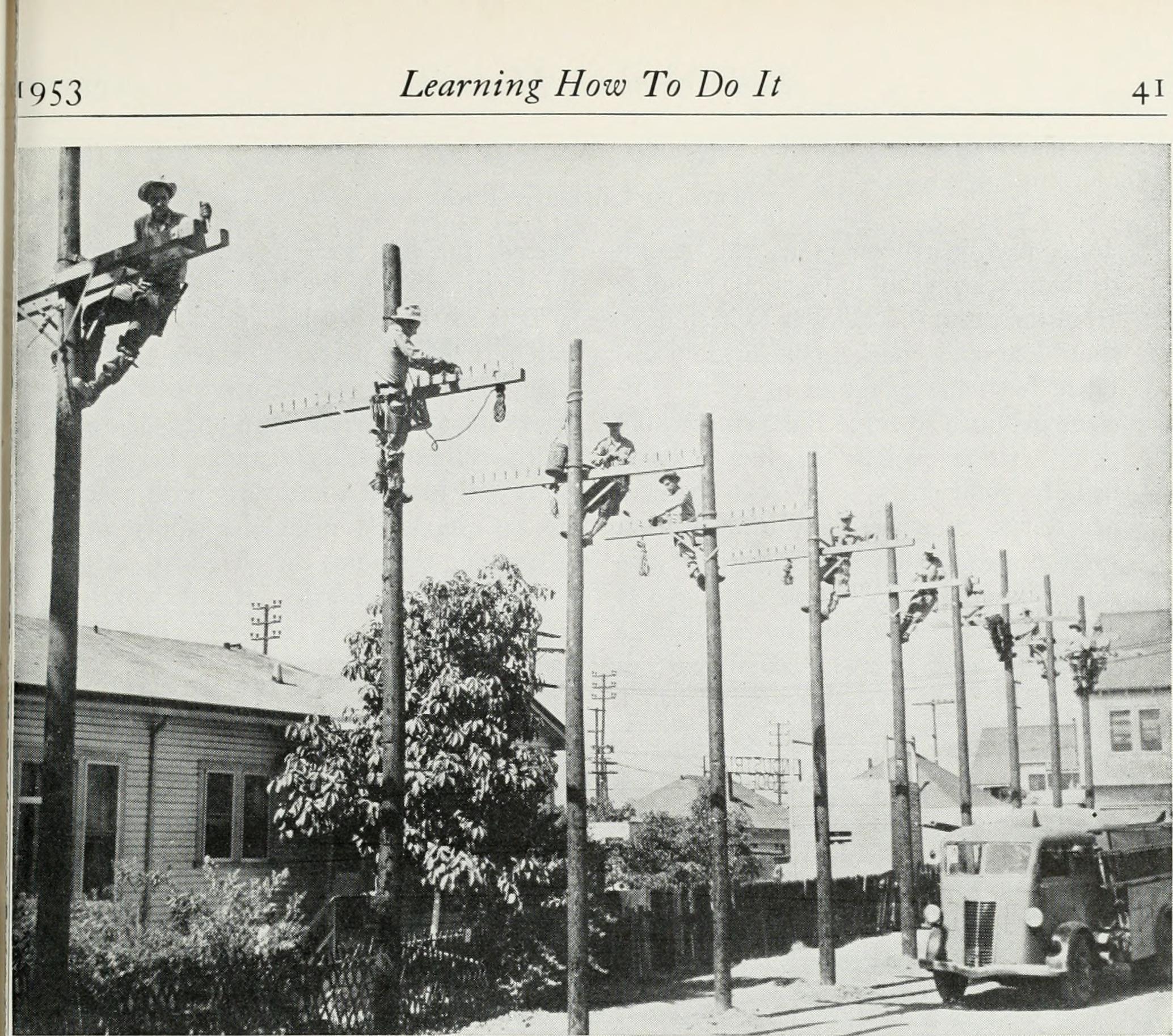
Lineworker training (1922)

Becoming a lineworker usually involves starting as an apprentice and a four-year training program before becoming a "Journey Lineworker". Apprentice powerline workers are trained in all types of work from operating equipment and climbing to proper techniques and safety standards. Schools throughout the United States offer a pre-apprentice lineworker training program such as Southeast Lineman Training Center and Northwest Lineman College.

== Safety ==
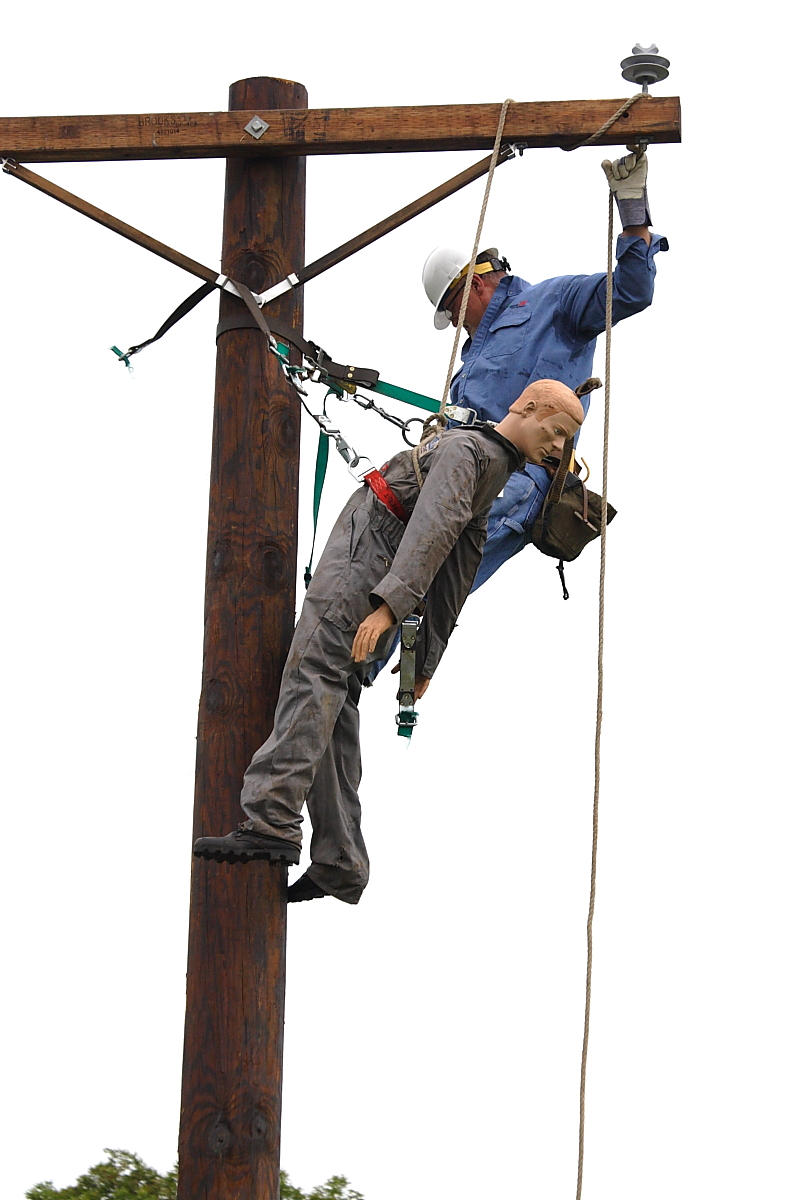
Ameren lineworker practicing a utility pole rescue

Lineworkers, especially those who work with live electrical apparatus, use personal protective equipment (PPE) to protect against inadvertent contact. This includes rubber gloves, rubber sleeves, bucket liners, and protective blankets.

When working with energized power lines, power line workers must use protection to prevent contact with the energized line. The requirements for PPE and associated permissible voltages depend on applicable regulations in the jurisdiction and company policy. Voltages higher than those that can be worked on with gloves are handled with special sticks known as hot-line tools or hot sticks, which allow power lines to be safely handled from a distance. Power line workers must also wear special rubber insulating gear when working with live wires to protect against accidental contact. The buckets power line workers sometimes work from are also insulated with fiberglass.

De-energized power lines can be hazardous, as they may still be energized from another source, such as interconnection or interaction with another circuit, even when they appear to be shut off. For example, a higher-voltage distribution-level circuit may feed several lower-voltage distribution circuits via transformers. If the higher-voltage circuit is de-energized but lower-voltage circuits connected remain energized, the higher-voltage circuit will remain energized. Another problem can arise when de-energized wires become energized by electrostatic or electromagnetic induction from nearby energized wires.

All live-line work PPE must be kept free of contaminants and regularly tested for dielectric integrity. This is done using high-voltage electrical testing equipment.

Other general items of PPE such as helmets are usually replaced at regular intervals.

== See also ==
- Overhead cable
- Wichita Lineman
