= Northwest Lineman College =

Vocational college in the United States

Coordinates: 43°32′09″N 116°23′34″W

- Type: Technical College, Private
- Established: 1993
- Parent institution: Quanta Services
- Location: Meridian, Idaho; Oroville, California; Denton, Texas; Edgewater, Florida
- Colors: Burgundy, White, Black, Gold and Grey
- Nickname: NLC
- Website: http://www.lineman.edu

Northwest Lineman College, founded in 1993, is a private vocational technical college offering training programs with a concentration on careers in the power delivery industry. The main campus is located in Meridian, Idaho and branch campuses are located in Oroville, California, Denton, Texas and Edgewater, Florida.

Northwest Lineman College offers technical certificate training programs for those seeking a career in the power delivery industry, and also for people working in the industry seeking trade-specific certifications.

== History ==
1993 - Northwest Lineman College founded in Meridian, Idaho in a leased lumberyard.

1996 - Campus moved to outskirts of town on Highway 69; equal distances from Meridian and Kuna, Idaho. Five acres of land purchased and new 6,000-square-foot (560 m^{2}) facilities constructed.

1998 - Northwest Lineman College begins researching and authoring a comprehensive curriculum composed of topics related to the power delivery industry. The project would continue until 2002.

2000 - Northwest Lineman College earns national accreditation through the Accrediting Commission of Career Schools and Colleges of Technology (ACCSCT).

2002 - Lineworker Certification Program established for power companies seeking journey-level certification for their lineworkers.

2003 - Campus expansion project increases facility square footage from 6,000 square feet (560 m^{2}) to 24,000 square feet (2,200 m^{2}). Lab facility is added.

2006 - Acreage purchased increasing land space from 14 acres (57,000 m^{2}) to 31.

2006 - First branch campus is opened in Oroville, California.

2007 - Utility Training Services department established providing customized training programs for utility companies worldwide.

2010 - Second branch campus is opened in Denton, Texas.

2016 - Third branch campus is opened in Edgewater, Florida.

2018- In January 2018, Northwest Lineman College was acquired by Quanta Services.
