= Bella French Swisher =

American writer (1837–1893)

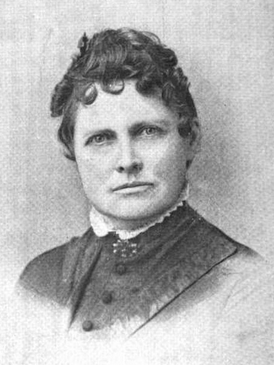
- Born: Isabella French; December 1837; Trenton, Georgia, U.S.
- Died: September 28, 1893 (aged 55); Sausalito, California, U.S.
- Resting place: Mountain View Cemetery, Oakland, California, U.S.
- Other name: "Bella"
- Occupations: author, editor, litterateur
- Spouse: John Milton Swisher (m. 1878–1891)
- Writing career
- Language: English
- Genres: non-fiction, novels, poetry, journalism
- Notable work: American Sketch Book

Signature
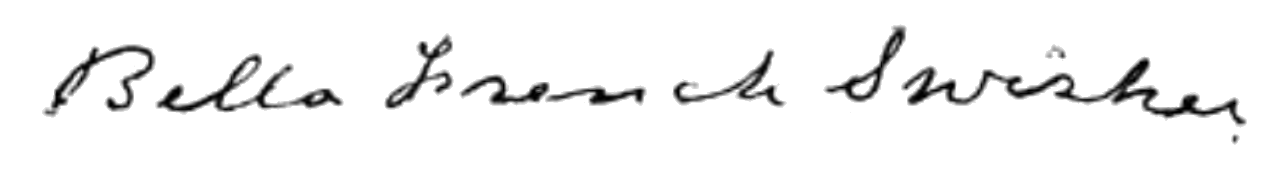

Bella French Swisher (née, French; December 1837 – September 28, 1893) was a 19th-century American author, editor, and litterateur. She was also the founder, publisher, and owner of a newspaper (The Western Progress) and a magazine (American Sketch Book). Swisher was connected with the Daily La Crosse Democrat, The Western Progress, Pioneer Press, and the St. Paul Chronotype. Besides her journalistic writings, she published several books of non-fiction, novels, and poetry. Some of them included, History of Brown County, Wisconsin, in several volumes, Struggling up to the Lights, Homeless Thought at Home, Cassie, The Story of a Woman's Love, and Rocks and Shoals. Swisher died in 1893.

== Early life and education ==
Isabella (nickname, "Bella") French was born December 1837, at Trenton, Georgia. On her mother's side, she was related to Generals Jacob Brown and Henry Lee III, of Revolutionary era. Her grandfather, Capt. William Lee, commanded the first passenger boat that made the tour of the Great Lakes. Her father was an architect and inventor, of considerable renown, who was unfortunately stripped of quite a fortune by the great overflow of the Mississippi River in 1851; and three years later, he started for England to recover some portion of his mother's estate, but was lost at sea, or supposed to have been, as he was never heard of thereafter. Then came, for the family, weary years of battle with want.

Before Bella was fourteen, she sewed from early morning till lights grew dim, at shirt making, to keep herself and family from starvation. Being obliged to leave school, she pursued her studies at night, with her books open before her while she worked. It is said "she made rhymes before she could speak plain, and played at writing stories before she could form a letter."

== Career ==
After she went north with relatives, a sister died, then a brother during the Civil War, fighting for the Union, and a few months later the mother died. Swisher taught a little school, and saved enough money to enable her to attend a course at the University of Iowa, which fitted her for her destined work to be a poet.

In 1867, Brick Pomeroy, recognizing her genius in a short story that she sent him, employed her on the Daily LaCrosse Democrat. Two years later, she started The Western Progress, a weekly newspaper at Brownsville, Minnesota, which she owned, and edited for two years, and then sold to take a position on the editorial staff of the St. Paul Pioneer Press. She was editor of the first literary magazine in Minnesota, The Busy West, also editor of the St. Paul Chronotype. In 1874, she started the American Sketch Book, an eighty-page historical magazine, at La Crosse, Wisconsin, which, on account of ill health, she removed to Texas in 1877, when she was forty years of age. During the same year, 1877, she was associate editor of the Texas New Yorker published at Galveston, and editor of the Sketch Book in Austin, Texas.

In October, 1878, she married Col. John Milton Swisher (1819–1891), of Austin, a man sympathetic in his literary tastes, and abundant in his material wealth. (Note: According to McLean (1988), Col. Swisher married "Mrs. Bella French". Either her maiden name was Russell, and she had previously married a Mr. French; or "Mrs. Bella French" was a pen name.)

Two years later, she established a health spa, the "Thermo Water Cure or Hot Air Bath and Hygienic Institute", for those who suffered from neuralgia, paralysis, and rheumatism. In 1882, on account of family cares and sickness, she was obliged to suspend the Sketch Book. Among her published works were the History of Brown County, Wisconsin, in several volumes, Struggling up to the Lights, Homeless Thought at Home, Cassie, The Story of a Woman's Love, and Rocks and Shoals. Her obituary in The Austin Weekly Statesman (1893) mentioned that two posthumous volumes would be published, one a work on the symbology of the Bible, the other a collection of poems.

Swisher and her husband were both members of the Texas Esoteric Society. She studied painting under some of the best artists in the United States, and painted landscapes and portraits that commanded admiration. She was remembered as a sort of universal genius: she cooked a dinner, made a dress, nailed up a broken fence, harnessed her horses for a drive, edited a paper, wrote a story, and then entertained with her verses in the afternoon. She was at one time a prominent lecturer.

== Personal life ==
The couple resided in Austin until the husband died in 1891, when she removed to Sausalito, California. She died September 28, 1893, at her residence in Sausalito, (Note: According to Herringshaw (1914), Swisher died in 1894 in Texas.) and was buried at Mountain View Cemetery, Oakland, California.

== Selected works ==
- We shall meet and love in heaven, 1873
- Menomonie and Dunn County, Wisconsin., 1875
- Struggling up to the light : the story of a woman's life 1876
- The American sketch book : an historical and home magazine (1878–1882)
- History of Austin, Travis County, Texas, with a description of its resources., 1880
- Why editors and authors go insane, 1881
- History of San Antonio, Texas : with a description of its resources, 1881
- Rocks and shoals in the river of life, 1889
- Florecita, 1899
- The sin of Edith Dean, 1890
