= Rising Fawn, Georgia =

- Unincorporated community
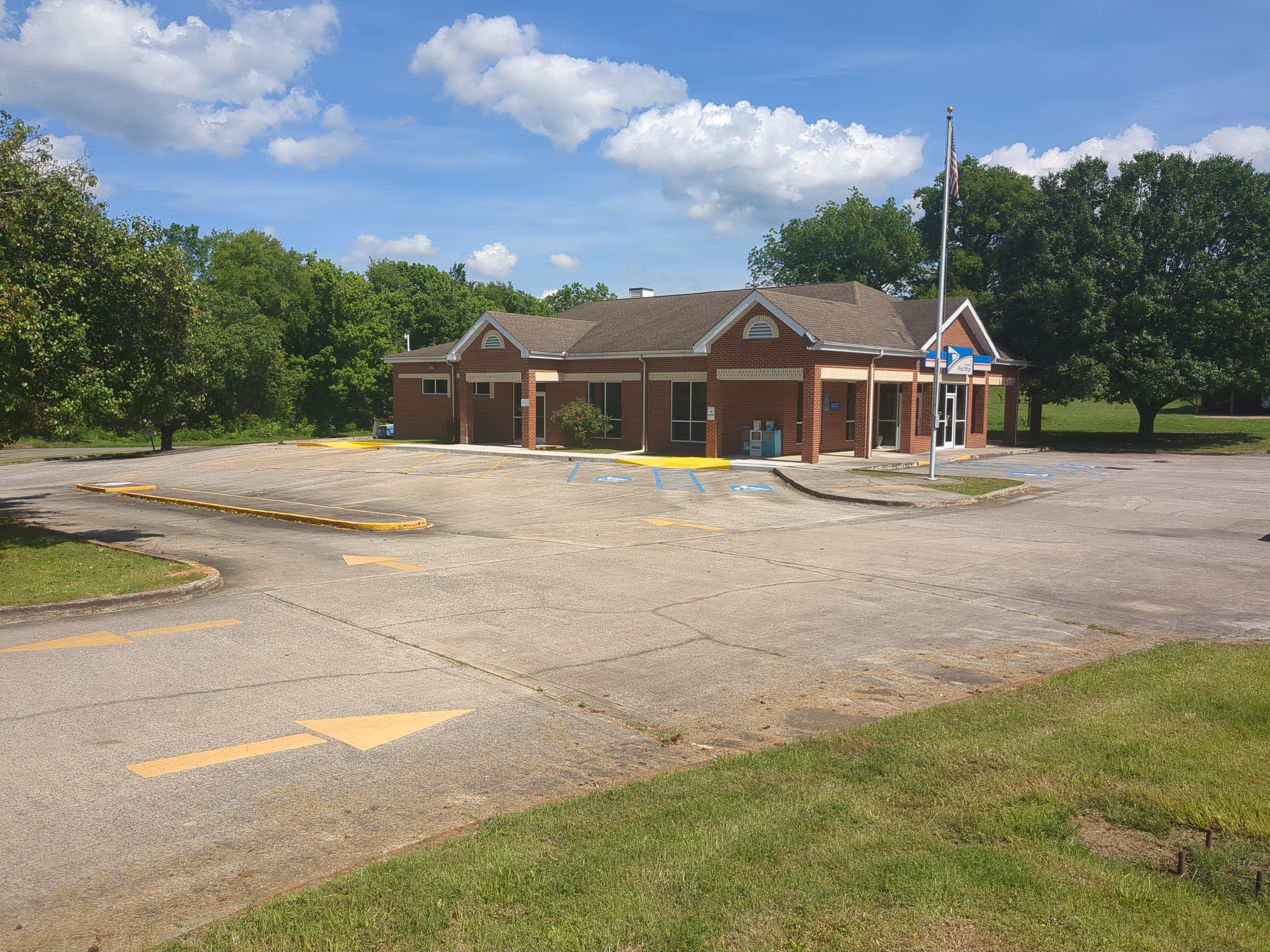
- U.S. post office (2026)

- Location within the state of Georgia Rising Fawn (the United States)
- Coordinates: 34°45′36″N 85°31′52″W
- Country: United States
- State: Georgia
- County: Dade
- Time zone: UTC-5 (Eastern (EST))
  - Summer (DST): UTC-4 (EDT)
- ZIP code: 30738
- Area codes: 706/762

Rising Fawn is an unincorporated community in the southern part of Dade County, Georgia, United States. It is the location of Cloudland Canyon State Park.

== History ==
Rising Fawn was named after the child of a Cherokee Indian chieftain. The custom was to name the child after the first thing seen. On the following dawn, the chief saw a fawn rise from its bed and thought that he hadn't seen anything more beautiful. He then named his child Rising Fawn.

== Geography ==
Rising Fawn is located in the northwestern part of Georgia, very close to the Alabama state line. Interstate 59 runs from southwest to northeast to the west of the community, leading northeast 28 mi (45 km) to Chattanooga, Tennessee (via I-59 to I-24), and southwest 120 mi (190 km) to Birmingham, Alabama. U.S. Route 11 also runs through the community, leading north 8 mi (13 km) to Trenton, the county seat of Dade County, and southwest 14 mi (23 km) to Hammondville, Alabama.

== Demographics ==
Rising Fawn is part of the Chattanooga, TN–GA Metropolitan Statistical Area.

== Notable people ==
- May Allison, silent film actress, was born here in 1890.
- Norman Blake, famed for his folk music, some of which was heard on the O Brother, Where Art Thou? soundtrack, resides in Rising Fawn.
- Desmond Doss, Medal of Honor recipient from World War II portrayed in the 2016 film Hacksaw Ridge, resided in Rising Fawn for most of his life after the war.
- Colton Moore, was the youngest politician ever elected in Dade County and grew up in Rising Fawn.
- Rick West, MCPON in U.S. Navy.
- Forester Sisters, Country Music Association's Vocal Group of the Year, from Rising Fawn.
