= Sutallee, Georgia =

Unincorporated community in Georgia, U.S.

Coordinates: 34°13′22″N 84°37′05″W

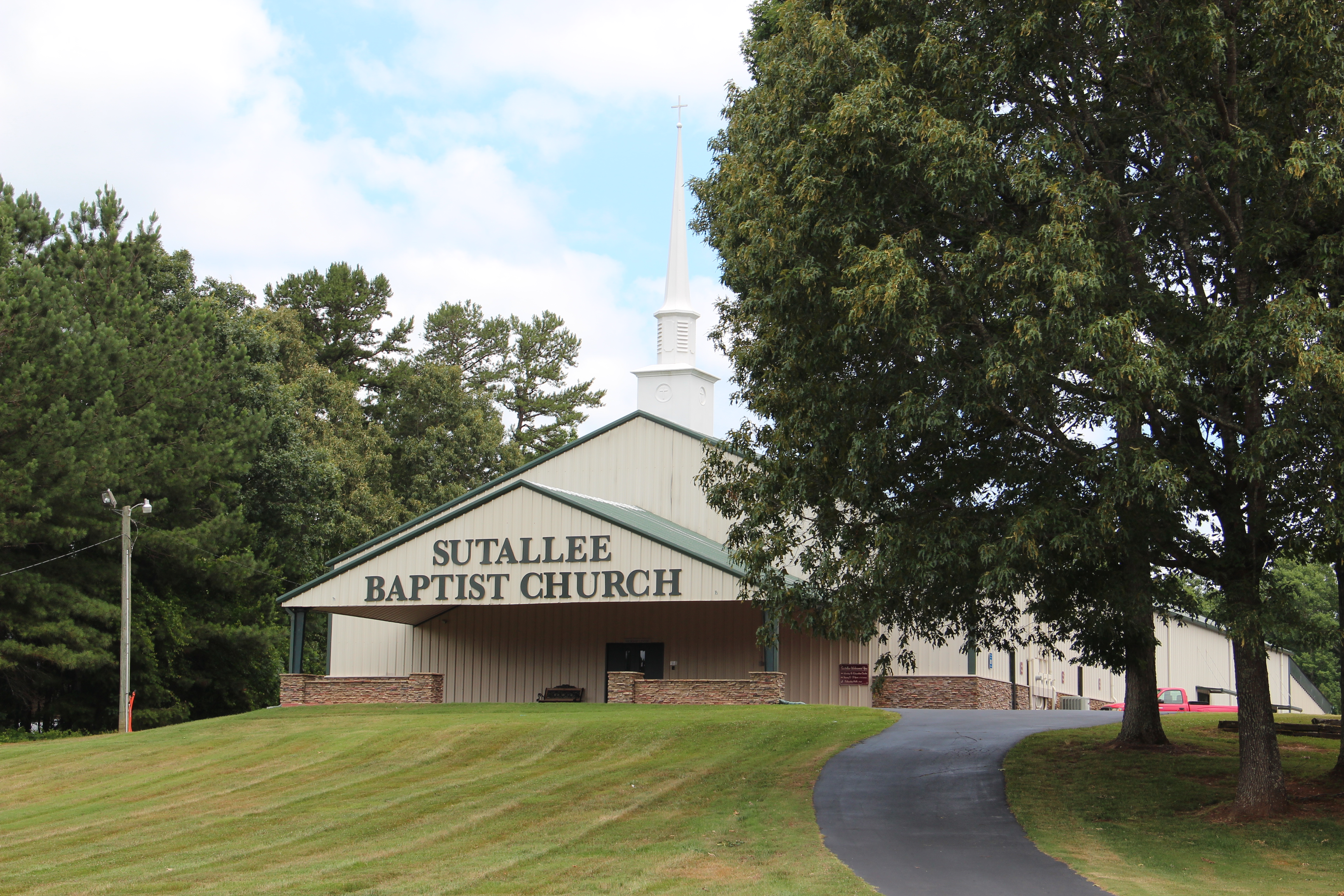
Sutallee Baptist Church

Sutallee is an unincorporated community in western Cherokee County, Georgia, United States. Located about two miles northwest of current-day Lake Allatoona, it is one of the county's earliest white settlements. It is believed that former Georgia Governor and U.S. Senator Joseph E. Brown maintained a farm in the area, on lowlands near the Etowah River (now Lake Allatoona), and was there harvesting wheat when told of the surprising news that he had been nominated for governor. Sutallee derives its unique name, which is often spelled "Sutalee" or "Suttallee", from an old Cherokee village that was located near the Etowah River named "Sutali" — the Cherokee word for the number six. Sixes, a community that sits on the eastern side of Lake Allatoona, also derives its name from this Native American village. Today, Sutallee is traversed by Georgia Highway 20 and remains mostly rural.

The Sutallee area sits at the crossroads between Bartow and Cherokee county
