= Southeast Lineman Training Center =

Location
- 9481 HWY 11 Trenton, GA 30752; Trenton, Georgia; United States; 34°50′30.8″N 85°31′47.5″W

Information
- Type: Vocational School
- Motto: "Put it all on the line", "Towards the Storm"
- Established: 1999
- Founder: George Nelson / Co-Founder: David Powell
- Chaplain: Eddie Cantrell
- Enrollment: 400
- Website: www.lineworker.com

Southeast Lineman Training Center, founded in 1999, is a vocational school offering training programs for people wanting to enter the linework industry. They offer two different programs, the Electrical Lineworker Program (ELP) and the Communications Lineworker Program (CLP), that are offered multiple times each year. The ELP is a 15-week training program for individuals desiring to become electrical lineworkers, and the CLP is an 8-week program for those wishing to enter the telecommunications field. SLTC is located in Trenton, Georgia approximately 20 miles (32 km) south of Chattanooga, Tennessee.

SLTC currently administers training to nearly 1,100 students per year in its Electrical Lineworker Program and is one of the largest lineworker training schools in the United States.

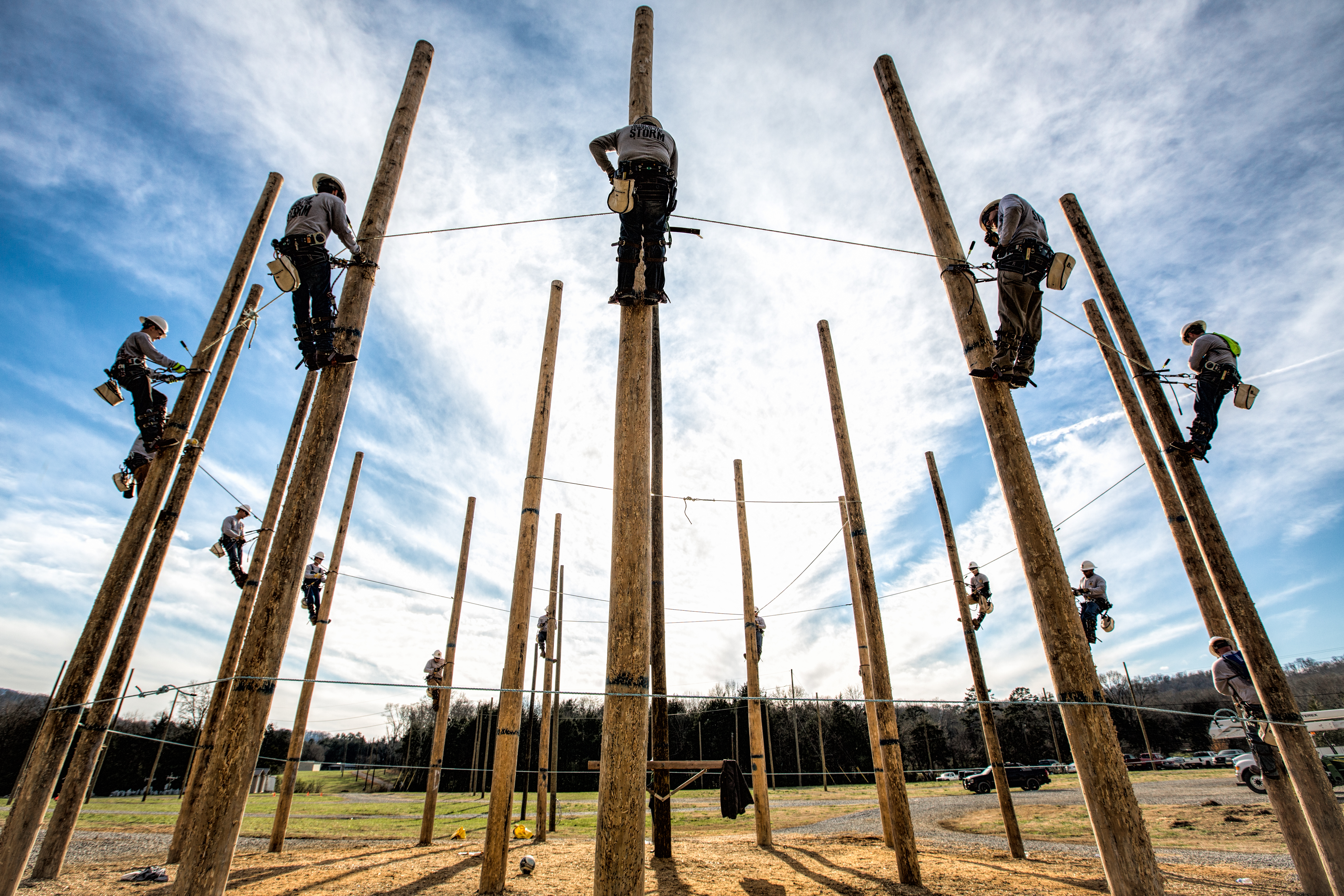
Students around pole circle at Southeast Lineman Training Center in Trenton, GA.

== History ==
Southeast Lineman Training Center (SLTC) was conceived in 1999 when George Nelson, an entrepreneur from Florida, was approached about the need for quality-trained apprentice lineworkers in the electric utility industry. So, like any visionary that sees a need, he purchased 19 acres (77,000 m^{2}) and started putting the pieces together. SLTC's first class was delivered on February 1, 2000, to 15 students. Two other classes were delivered that year to 19 other individuals. During that time, SLTC's office was a trailer with one pole circle in the training yard. In 2002, SLTC added its first administration building, which contained an office, classrooms, and lab areas. This building is still on campus but is now home to SLTC's marketing team. Since those first few years, SLTC has expanded its footprint nearly every year. The first and most significant expansion was the construction of their current corporate headquarters. This building is approximately 17,000-square-foot (1,600 m^{2}) and sits on the property of the main campus. Their next big expansion was purchasing an additional 21 acres (85,000 m^{2}) to allow the ELP to accommodate up to 220 students per class. This property is referred to as the extension campus and advanced underground lab area. Their most recent project has been the creation and development of SLTC Global. The SLTC Global campus allows them to conduct simulated and energized training for companies all over the world. They conduct training on-site and have staff that travels to administer training abroad.

=== Timeline ===
1999 - Southeast Lineman Training Center (founded in Trenton, Georgia on 19 acres (77,000 m^{2})).

2000 - February 1, 2000, first class was delivered to 13 students.

2002 - Electrical Lineworker Program training building was constructed.

2003 - Expansion of training yard to include transmission training.

2004 - Construction of 12,000-square-foot (1,100 m^{2}) administration building and classrooms.

2007 - Additional land purchased to increase training yard to 25 acres (100,000 m^{2}). CDL training grounds were added.

2008 - Expansion of training yard to include substation training.

2012 - Purchase of 21 acres (85,000 m^{2}) to expand ELP training facilities. Construction of a 6,000-square-foot building for classrooms and offices.

2011 - Expansion of training yard and increased enrollment to 140 students per term.

2014 - Additional land purchased, bringing all campuses' to approximately 75 acres (300,000 m^{2}) for the new SLTC Global campus. School increases to 200 students per term.

2015 - Construction beings on the new SLTC Global and Communications campus.

2016 - Communications Lineworker Program begins.

2017 - Live Line Training is now possible due to the addition of a Timpson Training Unit and an additional 30 acres purchased for the SLTC Global campus.
