= New England, Georgia =

- Unincorporated community Census-designated place
- Location within the state of Georgia New England, Georgia (the United States)
- Coordinates: 34°54′29″N 85°29′17″W
- Country: United States
- State: Georgia
- County: Dade
- Elevation: 761 ft (232 m)

Population (2020)
  - Total: 546
- Time zone: UTC-5 (Eastern (EST))
  - Summer (DST): UTC-4 (EDT)
- Area code: 706
- GNIS ID: 2812678

New England is an unincorporated community and census-designated place (CDP) in Dade County, in the U.S. state of Georgia. The 2020 census listed a population of 546.

== History ==
An early variant name was "Morrisons Station". The present name, adopted in 1889, is after the northeastern region of New England, the native home of the town's founders. A post office called New England City was established in 1889, and remained in operation until 1907.

The Georgia General Assembly incorporated the place as the "Town of New England City" in 1891. The town's municipal charter was repealed in 1995.

== Demographics ==
Historical population
Census	Pop.	Note	%±
2020	546		—
U.S. Decennial Census; 2020

New England was first listed as a census designated place in the 2020 United States census.

=== 2020 census ===
New England CDP, Georgia Racial and ethnic composition Note: the US Census treats Hispanic/Latino as an ethnic category. This table excludes Latinos from the racial categories and assigns them to a separate category. Hispanics/Latinos may be of any race.
Race / Ethnicity (NH = Non-Hispanic)	Pop 2020	% 2020
White alone (NH)	480	87.91%
Black or African American alone (NH)	1	0.18%
Native American or Alaska Native alone (NH)	10	1.38%
Asian alone (NH)	3	0.55%
Pacific Islander alone (NH)	0	0.00%
Some Other Race alone (NH)	3	0.55%
Mixed Race or Multi-Racial (NH)	32	5.86%
Hispanic or Latino (any race)	17	3.11%
Total	546	100.00%
