= Wildwood, Georgia =

- Unincorporated community Census-designated place
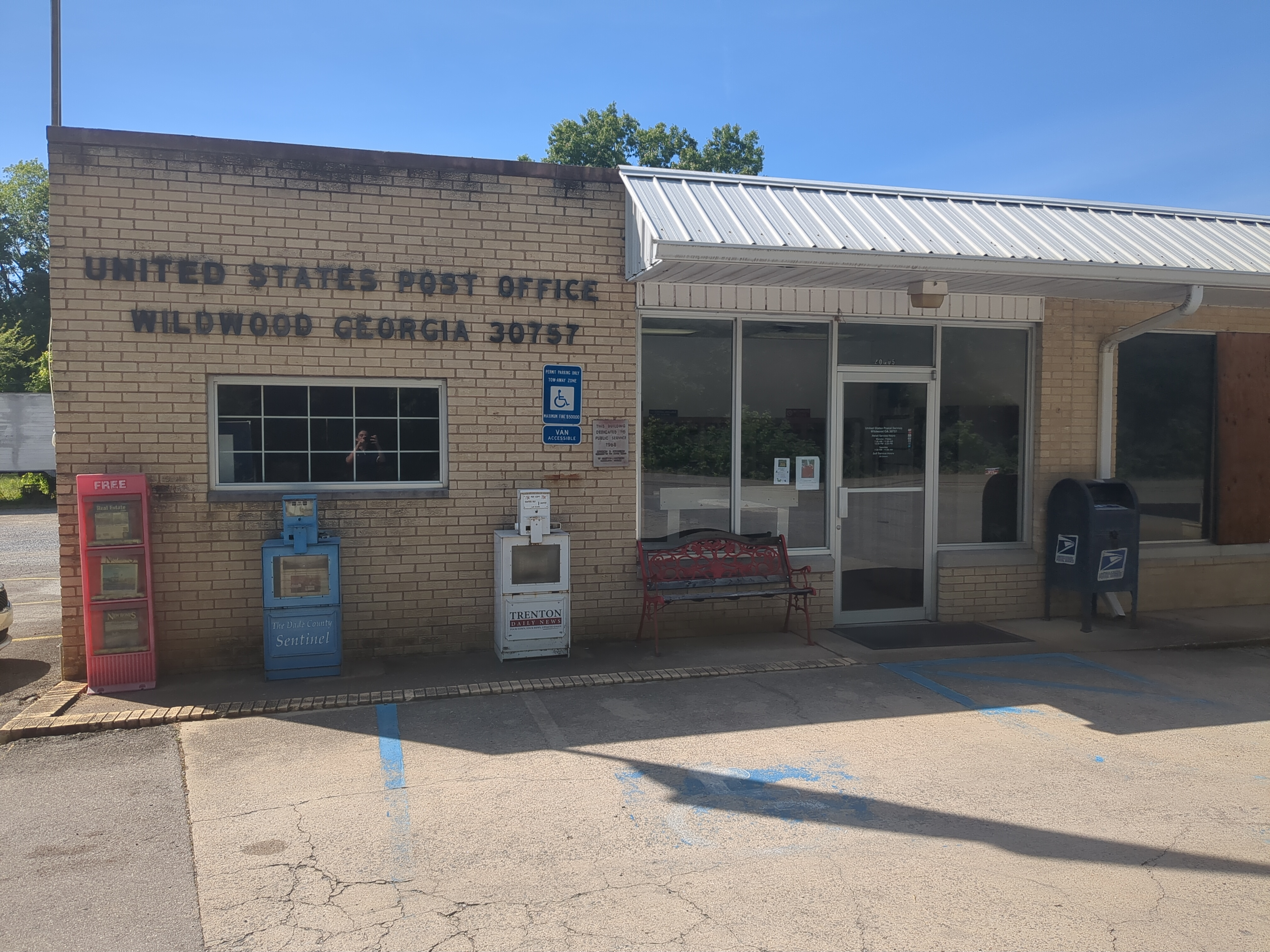
- U.S. Post Office in Wildwood, June 2026

- Location within Georgia
- Coordinates: 34°57′48.03″N 85°24′41.37″W
- Country: United States
- State: Georgia
- County: Dade

Population (2020)
  - Total: 382
- Time zone: UTC-5 (EST)
  - Summer (DST): UTC-4 (EDT)
- ZIP codes: 30757
- Area code: 706
- GNIS feature ID: 333427

Wildwood is an unincorporated community and census-designated place (CDP) located in the northeastern corner of Dade County, Georgia, United States. The 2020 census listed a population of 382.

== Description ==
The community is close to the Tennessee state line and the Chattanooga city limits, and is considered part of the Chattanooga metropolitan area. It sits in the diagonal valley between Sand Mountain and Lookout Mountain, which runs through all of Dade County and is home to most of its population. According to the 2000 Census, the 30757 Zip Code Tabulation Area had a population of 1,923—accounting for approximately 12% of Dade County's population of 16,040. The noted Southern humorist George Washington Harris (1814–1869) is buried in the Brock Cemetery in Wildwood, GA. Although he was considered one of the seminal writers of Southern humor and greatly influenced the literary works of Mark Twain, William Faulkner, and Flannery O'Connor, his grave was not officially identified and marked with a monument until 2008. Across the street from Brock Cemetery in Wildwood is Belvedere Plantation c. 1835, the oldest of the few remaining antebellum homes in the metro-Chattanooga area.

The northern terminus of Interstate 59 with Interstate 24 is found in the community. Via I-24, downtown Chattanooga is 11 mi (18 km) northeast, and Nashville, Tennessee, is 127 mi (204 km) northwest. Via I-59, Birmingham, Alabama, is 138 mi (222 km) southwest.

== Demographics ==
Historical population
Census	Pop.	Note	%±
2020	382		—
U.S. Decennial Census; 2020

Wildwood was first listed as a census designated place in the 2020 census.

=== 2020 census ===
Wildwood CDP, Georgia – Racial and ethnic composition Note: the US Census treats Hispanic/Latino as an ethnic category. This table excludes Latinos from the racial categories and assigns them to a separate category. Hispanics/Latinos may be of any race.
Race / Ethnicity (NH = Non-Hispanic)	Pop 2020	% 2020
White alone (NH)	320	83.77%
Black or African American alone (NH)	7	1.83%
Native American or Alaska Native alone (NH)	0	0.00%
Asian alone (NH)	15	3.93%
Pacific Islander alone (NH)	2	0.52%
Some Other Race alone (NH)	0	0.00%
Mixed Race or Multi-Racial (NH)	16	4.19%
Hispanic or Latino (any race)	22	5.76%
Total	382	100.00%
