= Crawfish Creek (Chickamauga Creek tributary) =

Stream in Georgia, U.S.

Coordinates: 34°51′08″N 85°16′02″W

Crawfish Creek is a stream in the U.S. state of Georgia. It is a tributary to West Chickamauga Creek.

Crawfish Creek received its name from the Cherokee Indians of the area, who saw crayfish in its water. A variant name is "Crayfish Creek".
