= Trenton, Georgia =

City in Georgia, United States

- City
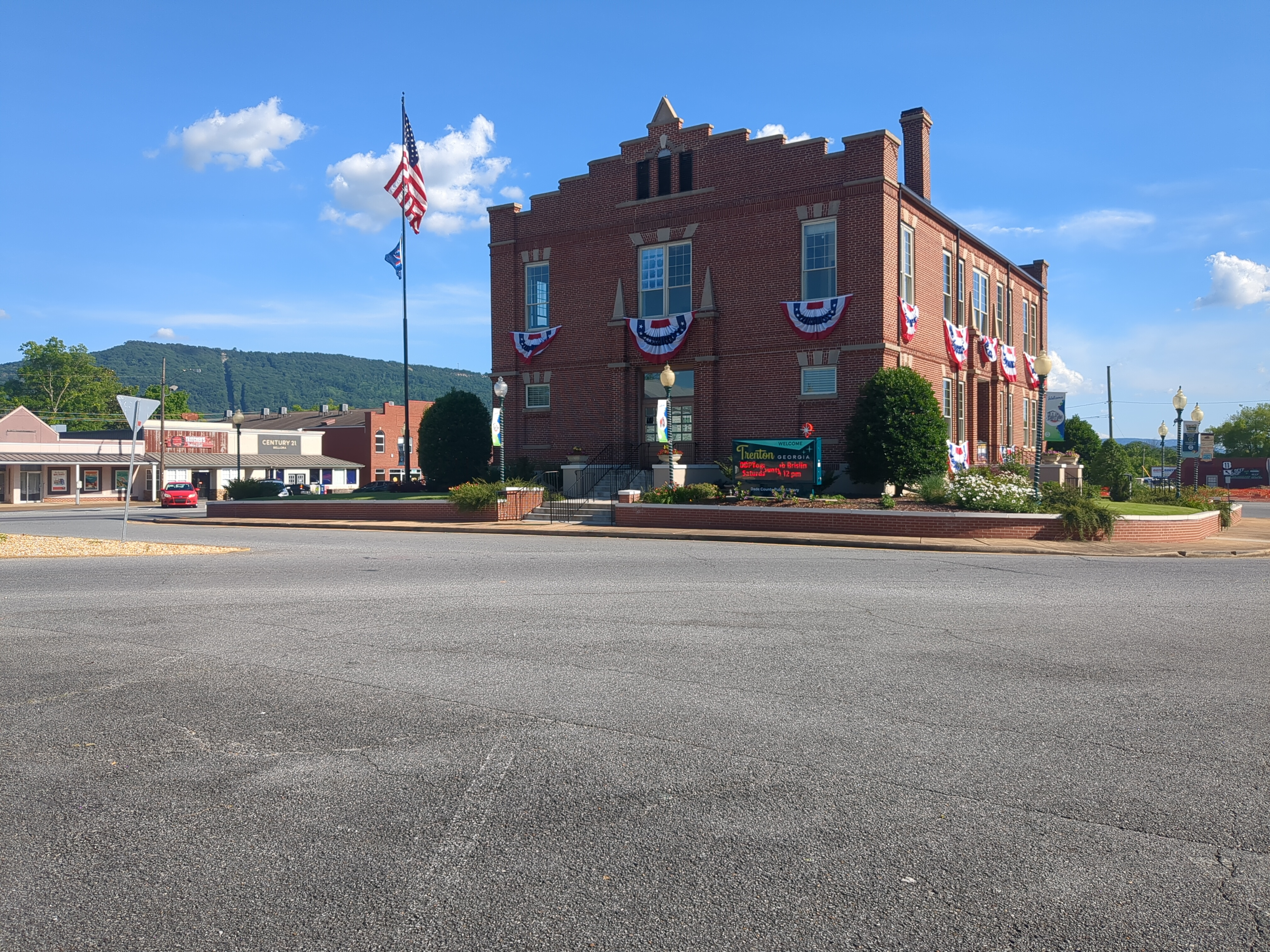
- Dade County Courthouse, Trenton, 2026

- Flag Seal

- Location in Dade County and the state of Georgia

- Location within the contiguous United States of America
- Coordinates: 34°52′32″N 85°30′31″W
- Country: United States
- State: (Georgia (U.S. state)) Georgia
- County: Dade
- Founded: 1830s
- Incorporated: February 18, 1854
- Named for: Trenton, New Jersey

Government
  - Type: Mayor-Council
  - Mayor: Alex Case (R)

Area
  - Total: 3.22 sq mi (8.33 km^{2})
  - Land: 3.22 sq mi (8.33 km^{2})
  - Water: 0 sq mi (0.00 km^{2})
- Elevation: 758 ft (231 m)

Population (2020)
  - Total: 2,195
  - Density: 682.6/sq mi (263.56/km^{2})
- Time zone: UTC-5 (EST)
  - Summer (DST): UTC-4 (EDT)
- ZIP code(s): 30752
- Area codes: 706, 762
- FIPS code: 13-77372
- GNIS feature ID: 0333261
- Website: trentonga.gov

Trenton (/trɛntɪn/) is a city and the only incorporated municipality in Dade County, Georgia, United States—and as such, it serves as the county seat. The population was 2,195 at the 2020 census. Trenton is part of the Chattanooga metropolitan area.

== History ==
Founded in the 1830s, the area was originally known as Salem. In 1839 Salem was designated the seat of the newly formed Dade County. It was renamed Trenton in 1841. The present name is a transfer from Trenton, the state capital of New Jersey.

== Geography ==
Trenton is located at 34°52′32″N 85°30′31″W (34.875609, −85.508644).

The city is located in the northwestern part of the state along Interstate 59, which runs from southwest to northeast to the west of the city, leading northeast 20 mi (32 km) to Chattanooga, Tennessee (via I-59 to I-24), and southwest 128 mi (206 km) to Birmingham, Alabama. U.S. Route 11 and Georgia State Route 136 are the main roads through the center of the city, with U.S. 11 leading northeast to Chattanooga and southwest 35 mi (56 km) to Fort Payne, Alabama. GA-136 leads southeast 27 mi (43 km) to LaFayette and west 6 mi (9.7 km) to the Alabama state line.

According to the United States Census Bureau, the city has a total area of 3.1 square miles (8.0 km^{2}), all land.

== Demographics ==
Historical population
Census	Pop.	Note	%±
1870	223		—
1880	255		14.3%
1890	378		48.2%
1900	349		−7.7%
1910	302		−13.5%
1920	295		−2.3%
1930	370		25.4%
1940	570		54.1%
1950	755		32.5%
1960	1,301		72.3%
1970	1,523		17.1%
1980	1,682		10.4%
1990	1,994		18.5%
2000	1,942		−2.6%
2010	2,301		18.5%
2020	2,195		−4.6%
U.S. Decennial Census; 1850-1870 1870-1880; 1890-1910 1920-1930; 1940 1950 1960; 1970 1980 1990; 2000 2010

=== 2020 census ===
As of the 2020 census, Trenton had a population of 2,195. The median age was 37.6 years. 23.3% of residents were under the age of 18 and 19.0% of residents were 65 years of age or older. For every 100 females there were 90.4 males, and for every 100 females age 18 and over there were 85.3 males age 18 and over.

0.0% of residents lived in urban areas, while 100.0% lived in rural areas.

There were 914 households in Trenton, of which 32.7% had children under the age of 18 living in them. Of all households, 41.0% were married-couple households, 16.5% were households with a male householder and no spouse or partner present, and 36.4% were households with a female householder and no spouse or partner present. About 31.8% of all households were made up of individuals and 16.6% had someone living alone who was 65 years of age or older.

There were 1,014 housing units, of which 9.9% were vacant. The homeowner vacancy rate was 1.9% and the rental vacancy rate was 6.1%.

Racial composition as of the 2020 census
Race	Number	Percent
White	2,003	91.3%
Black or African American	18	0.8%
American Indian and Alaska Native	9	0.4%
Asian	18	0.8%
Native Hawaiian and Other Pacific Islander	0	0.0%
Some other race	29	1.3%
Two or more races	118	5.4%
Hispanic or Latino (of any race)	63	2.9%

=== 2010 census ===
As of the census of 2010, there were 2,301 people, 904 households, and 599 families residing in the city. The population density was 742.25 inhabitants per square mile (286.58/km^{2}). There were 1,012 housing units at an average density of 326.45 per square mile (126.04/km^{2}). The racial makeup of the city was 95.5% White, 0.7% African American, 0.3% Native American, 0.8% Asian, 0.2% Pacific Islander, 0.9% from other races, and 1.7% from two or more races. Hispanic or Latino of any race were 3.2% of the population.

There were 904 households, out of which 31.6% had children under the age of 18 living with them, 46.9% were married couples living together, 14.5% had a female householder with no husband present, and 33.7% were non-families. 29.2% of all households were made up of individuals who lived alone, and 12.9% of those were someone living alone who was 65 years of age or older. The average household size was 2.40 and the average family size was 2.94.

In the city, the population was spread out, with 27.0% under the age of 18, 15.3% from 20 to 29, 12.7.2% from 30 to 39, 31.0% from 40 to 64, and 13.7% who were 65 years of age or older. The median age was 35.9 years. For every 100 females, there were 98.36 males. For every 100 females age 18 and over, there were 94.18 males in the same age group.

The median income for a household in the city was $34,612, and the median income for a family was $40,450. Males had a median income of $31,354 versus $22,104 for females. The per capita income for the city was $16,336. About 10.5% of families and 13.4% of the population were below the poverty line, including 17.5% of those under age 18 and 11.4% of those age 65 or over.

== Flag ==
In 2001, Georgia replaced its state flag, as some citizens had objected that its design incorporated the Confederate battle flag. That year, Trenton city officials adopted the old state flag as a city flag. The city had already used it from 1956 to 2001 as an official city banner. (That followed the 1954 United States Supreme Court ruling in Brown v. Board of Education that racially segregated public education was unconstitutional.) After adopting the former state flag for the city in 2001, Trenton City Council also voted to post a plaque bearing the Ten Commandments at city hall. The city flies the flag outside the city hall and police department building and in the city park next to the courthouse and the library. In addition, many local businesses fly it.

The city also flies one of the historic flags of the Confederate States of America, the Blood-Stained Banner, in the city park.

== Education ==
The Dade County School District administers grades pre-school to grade twelve. It operates two elementary schools, a middle school, and a high school, all of which are located within the city of Trenton except for Davis Elementary.

- Dade Elementary School
- Davis Elementary School
- Dade Middle School
- Dade County High School

As well as Southeast Lineman Training Center

== Attractions ==
- Cloudland Canyon State Park
- Dade County Courthouse is listed on the National Register of Historic Places listings in Georgia (National Register of Historic Places).

== Major roads and travel ==
- Interstate 59: I-59 runs north and south and connects Birmingham to Chattanooga
- U.S. Route 11 runs north and south, parallel to Interstate 59
- State Route 136: Hwy 136 runs west and east and connects Dade County to Walker County.
- Norfolk Southern Railway

== Media ==
- Dade County Sentinel (weekly newspaper)
- Discover Dade (Local media portal and news service)
- WKWN AM 1420, FM 106.1, and FM 101.3 (A mix of local and syndicated content, including local weather and traffic)

== Notable people ==
- Bella French Swisher (1837–1893), writer

== See also ==
- List of municipalities in Georgia (U.S. state)
- National Register of Historic Places listings in Dade County, Georgia
