= History of Rome, Georgia =

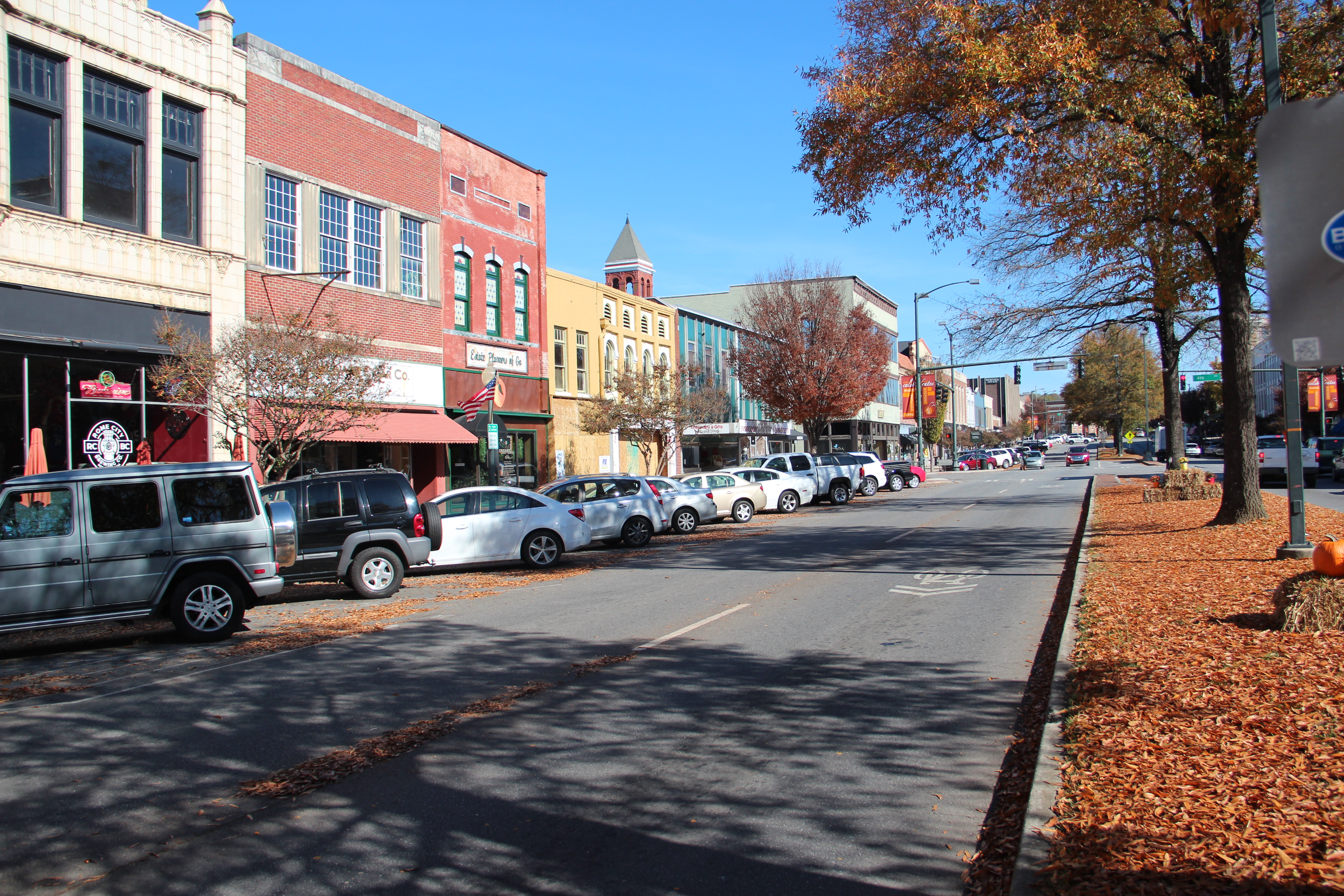
Broad Street in downtown Rome, Georgia

The history of Rome, Georgia extends to thousands of years of human settlement by ancient Native Americans. Spanish explorers recorded reaching the area in the later 16th century, and European Americans of the United States founded the city named Rome in 1834, when the residents of the area were still primarily Cherokee, before their removal on the Trail of Tears to Indian Territory. The competition for resources among its diverse inhabitants led to both innovation and strife. Its location at the confluence of three rivers enabled Rome to develop as a crossroads for trade and transportation. The city was later designated as the county seat of Floyd County, Georgia. Today, Rome is the largest city in Northwest Georgia, and is a regional center of healthcare, education, and manufacturing.

== Native American era ==
Preceded by numerous other cultures, the people of the Mississippian culture inhabited the area from about 1000 CE. These people are believed to have suffered high mortality rates and mostly died off in the late 16th century due to exposure to new infectious diseases carried by the Spanish expeditions. Specific information about events in the area of Rome before the Spanish expeditions in the 16th century is unknown, due to the native inhabitants' lack of written records; archeological excavations and linguistics have provided insight to the cultures.

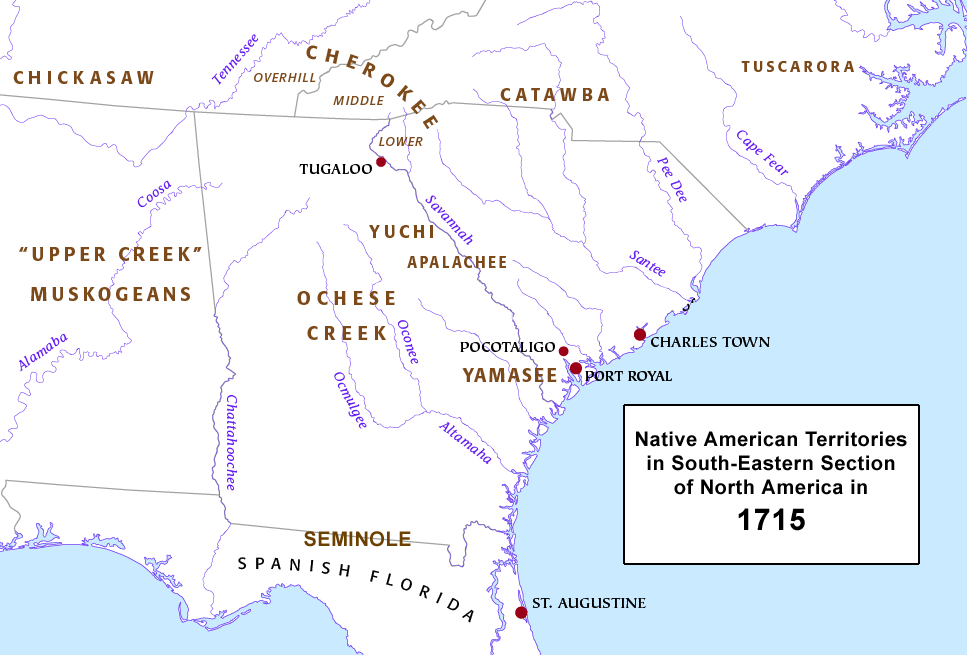
Native American territories in the Southeastern area of North America in 1715. State outlines are from later times.

Historians debate whether Hernando de Soto was the first Spanish explorer to encounter Native Americans in the area now known as Rome, but they widely agree that he passed through the region with his expedition in 1540. In 1560, Tristán de Luna sent a detachment of 140 soldiers and two Dominican friars north along de Soto's route. This group established relations with the Coosa chiefdom and assisted the Coosa in a raid against the rebellious province of Napochín, in what is now known as Tennessee. Exposed to unfamiliar European diseases, within 20 years these mound builders were gone, replaced by the Creek.

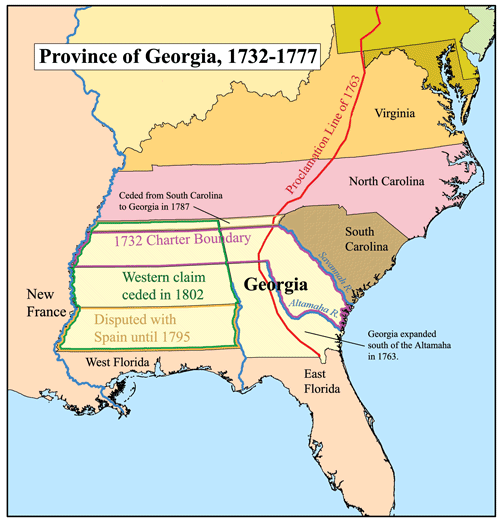
Georgia colony, 1732–1777, and the Proclamation Line of 1763

The Abihka tribe of Creek in the area of Rome later became part of the Upper Creek, and merged with other tribes to become the Ulibahalis. They later migrated westward into Alabama, settling in the general region of Gadsden, By the mid-18th century, the Cherokee people had moved into the area, pushed by European-American encroachment.

In the 18th century, a high demand in Europe for American deer skins had led to a brisk trade between Creek and later Cherokee hunters and white traders. A Cherokee village named Chatuga was established near the confluence of the Coosa River after their migration westward during the Cherokee–American wars (1776-1794). The Cherokee referred to this area as "Head of Coosa." Several Cherokee leaders settled here, developing plantations, including chiefs Major Ridge and John Ross. In the mid-20th century, the Junior League bought Ridge's house for preservation and in 1971 adapted it as a museum known as the Chieftains House. It is now officially the Chieftains Museum (Major Ridge Home) and has been designated by the Department of Interior as a National Historic Landmark.

The Head of Coosa Cherokee allowed a few white traders and some settlers (primarily from the British Colonies of Georgia and Carolina) to trade here. They were later joined by missionaries and more settlers. After the American War of Independence, most new settlers came from the area of the U.S. state of Georgia east of the Proclamation Line of 1763, by which Britain had tried to preserve the territory west of the Appalachian Mountains for Native Americans. When the American War for Independence ended, the Proclamation Line of 1763 became effectively obsolete in the new United States, when the Treaty of Paris (1783) ceded all British territory east of the Mississippi River to the U.S., including the lands that were previously designated as the "Indian Reserve" by the Proclamation of 1763.

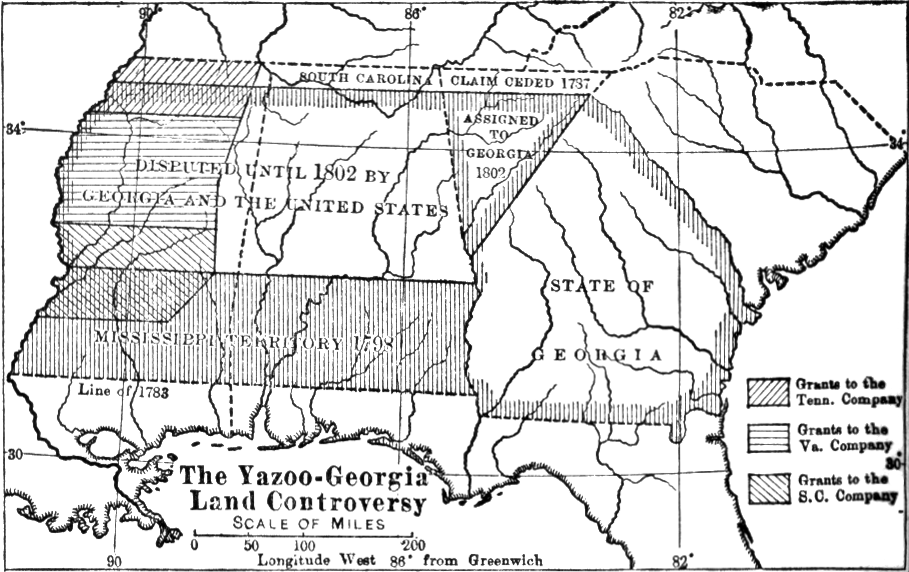
1802 map of Georgia-Yazoo lands. The triangular section labeled "Assigned to Georgia 1802" was Cherokee land claimed as part of the Compact of 1802 between Georgia and the United States

Encroachment soon began on these Cherokee lands by European Americans. The United States and Georgia executed the Compact of 1802, in which Georgia sold its claimed Western lands to the United States. (In colonial times, it claimed territory extending west to the Mississippi from its coastal colony.) In exchange, the United States agreed to ignore Cherokee land titles and remove all Cherokee from Georgia. The commitment to evict the Cherokee was not immediately enforced, however. Through the 1820s and 1830s, chiefs Major Ridge and John Ross led efforts to stop their removal, including several Federal lawsuits.

During the 1813 Creek Civil War, most Cherokee took the side of the Upper Creek Indians against the more traditional Red Stick Creek Indians. Before they moved to Head of Coosa, Chief Ridge commanded a company of Cherokee warriors as a unit of the Tennessee militia, with Chief Ross as adjutant. This unit was under the overall command of Major Andrew Jackson, and supported the Upper Creek.

In 1829, gold was discovered near Dahlonega, Georgia, which began the United States' second major gold rush. The Indian Removal Act of 1830, which fulfilled the Compact of 1802, was prompted by the gold discovery as well as President Andrew Jackson's already stated strong support for removal. In 1831 Georgia's General Assembly quickly passed legislation claiming all Cherokee land in Northwest Georgia, prior to their vacating it. This entire territory was called Cherokee County until additional legislation in 1832 divided the territory into the nine counties that exist today.

== City founding period ==
In 1834, the city of Rome was founded by Col. Henry Thomas McCool, Col. Zachariah Branscome Hargrove, Maj. Philip Hemphill, Col. William Smith, and Mr. John Lumpkin (nephew of Governor Lumpkin), who determined the name for the new city by holding a drawing. Each put his choice in a hat, with Col. Mitchell submitting the name of Rome in reference to the area's hills and rivers. Mitchell's submission was selected, and the Georgia Legislature made Rome an official city in 1835. The county seat was subsequently moved east from the village of Livingston to Rome.

== Civil War period ==
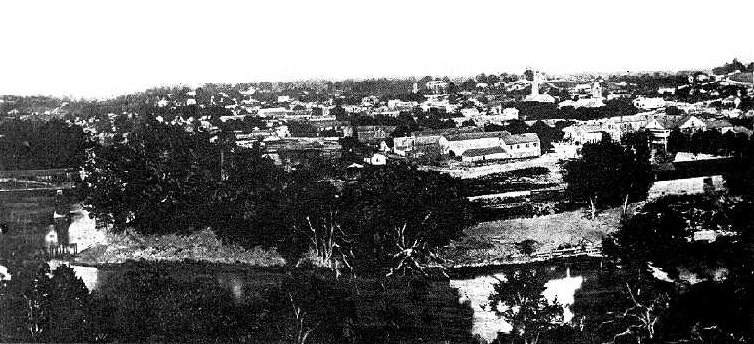
Rome in 1864, during the occupation by Union forces

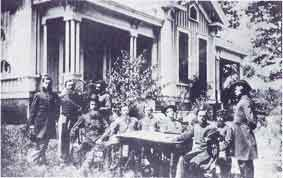
Vandever and his officers in Rome (1864, on East 4th Ave)

In April 1863, during the U.S. Civil War, the city was defended by Confederate General Nathan Bedford Forrest against Union Colonel Abel Streight's "lightning mule" raid from the area east of modern-day Cedar Bluff, Alabama. General Forrest tricked Colonel Streight into surrendering just a few miles shy of Rome. Realizing their vulnerability, Rome's city council allocated $3,000 to build three fortifications. Although these became operational by October 1863, efforts to strengthen the forts continued as the war progressed. These forts were named after Romans who had been killed in action: Fort Attaway was on the western bank of the Oostanaula River, Fort Norton was on the eastern bank of the Oostanaula, and Fort Stovall was on the southern bank of the Etowah River. At least one other fort was later built on the northern side of the Coosa River.

In May 1864, Union General Jefferson C. Davis, under the command of Major General William Tecumseh Sherman, attacked and captured Rome when the outflanked Confederate defenders retreated under command of Major General Samuel Gibbs French. Union General William Vandever was stationed in Rome, and is depicted with his staff in a picture taken there. Due to Rome's forts and iron works, which included the manufacture of cannons, Rome was an important military target. Davis's forces occupied Rome for several months, making repairs to the damaged forts and briefly quartering General Sherman. On November 11, 1864, in accordance with Sherman's Special Field Orders, No. 120, Union forces destroyed Rome's forts, iron works, the rail line to Kingston, and any other material that could be useful to the South's war effort as they withdrew from Rome to participate in Sherman's March to the Sea.

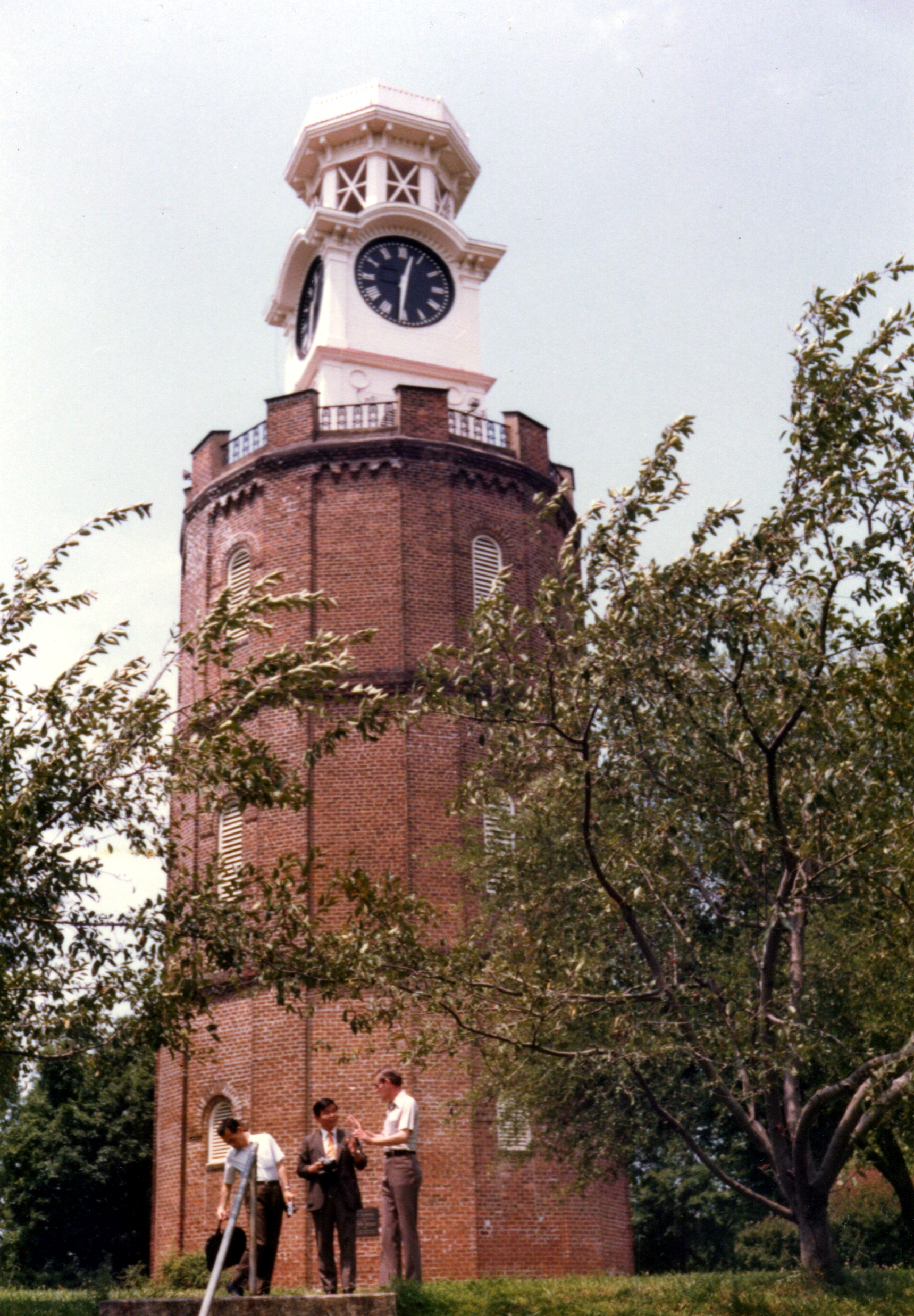
The clock tower, circa 1980

== Reconstruction period ==
In 1871, Rome constructed a water tank on Neely Hill, which overlooks the downtown district. This later became a clock tower, and has served as the town's iconic landmark ever since, appearing in the city's crest and local business logos. As a result, Neely Hill is also referred to as Clock Tower Hill.

With two rivers merging to form a third, Rome has occasionally been subjected to serious flooding. The first severe flood after Rome became a city was the flood of 1886, which inundated the city and allowed a steamboat to travel down Broad Street. In 1891, upon recommendation of the United States Army Corps of Engineers, the Georgia State Legislature amended Rome's charter to create a commission to oversee the construction of river levees to protect the town against future floods. In the late 1890s, additional flood control measures were instituted, including raising the height of Broad Street by about 15 feet. As a result, many of the current basements of Rome's historic buildings were originally ground level entrances.

== See also ==
- Rome sit-ins
