= Floyd County Courthouse (Georgia) =

Courthouse in Floyd County, Georgia, US

- U.S. National Register of Historic Places
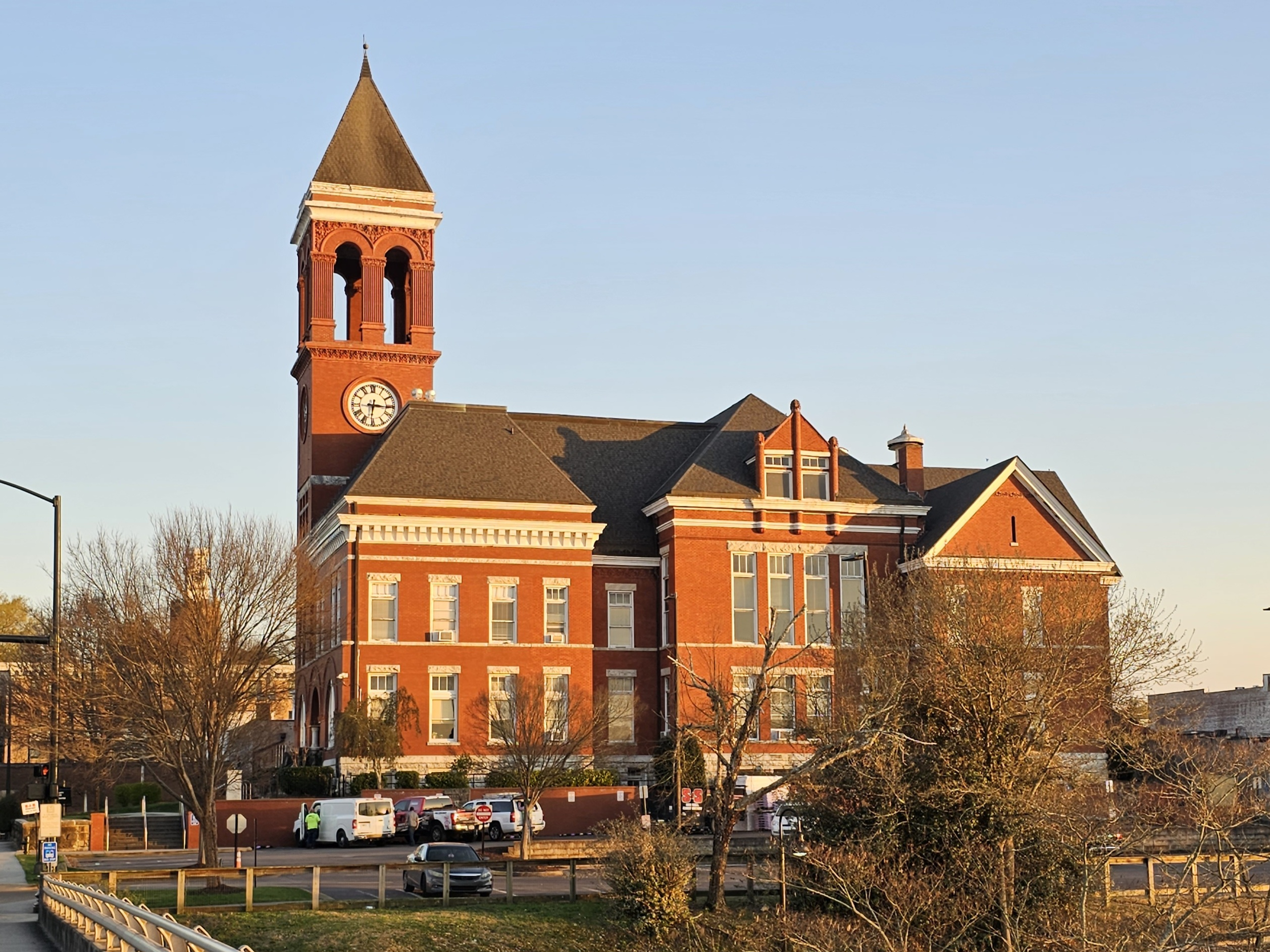
- The historic courthouse in March 2023

- Location within Georgia Location within the United States
- The location of the courthouse within the city of Rome
- Location: 4 Government Plaza, Rome, Georgia.
- Coordinates: 34°15′21.1″N 85°10′16.9″W
- Area: less than 1 acre
- Built: 1892–1893
- Architect: Bruce & Morgan
- Architectural style: Romanesque Revival
- NRHP reference No.: 80001067
- Added to NRHP: February 2, 1980

The Floyd County Courthouse in Rome, Georgia, was constructed in between 1892 and 1893. Designed by the Bruce & Morgan architectural firm in the Romanesque Revival style, the courthouse was in use from 1892 until the construction of the new courthouse in 1975, which remains in use as of March 2026. On February 2, 1980, it was added to the National Register of Historic Places under the reference number 80001067.

On March 23, 2026, a fire broke out while the courthouse was undergoing renovations. Everyone inside of the building at the time of the fire was evacuated safely, although the building itself was severely damaged. The cause of the fire remains unknown.

== History ==
=== Background ===
The first Floyd County courthouse was a small log cabin located in the original county seat of Livingston. It was in use from its designation in 1833 until the construction of a second, brick courthouse in 1835. The second courthouse would be the first to be constructed in the city of Rome after the county seat was moved. It would remain in use until 1858 when it was replaced by the third courthouse, another brick building. The third courthouse is unique in being one of the few buildings that wasn't destroyed when the Union invaded the city in 1864.

=== Design and construction ===
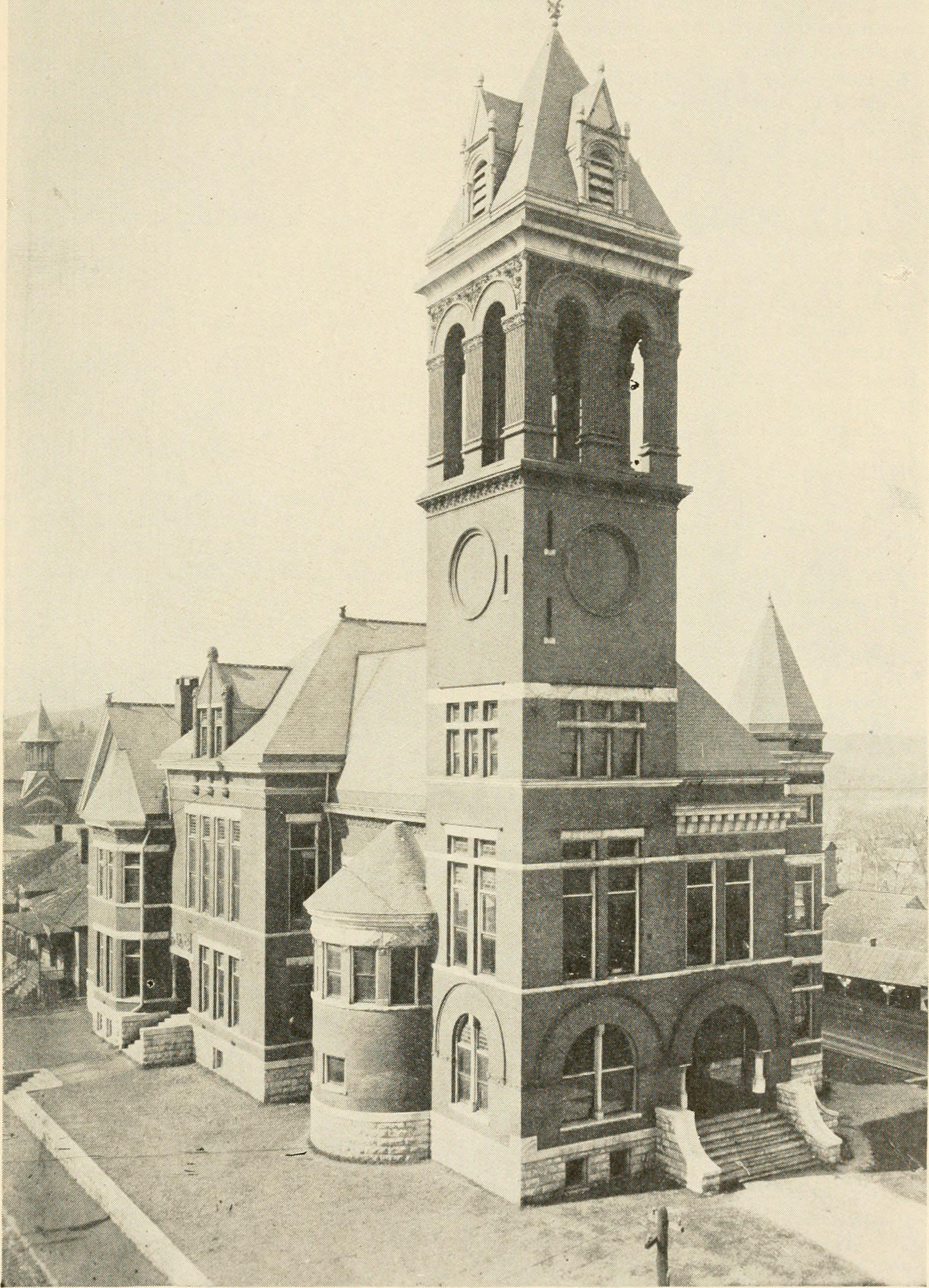
The courthouse as it appeared in 1922

The fourth courthouse was to be located near the banks of the Oostanaula river in downtown Rome. Construction lasted from 1892 to 1893. Upon completion, the third courthouse was torn down to make way for a new road while court proceedings were moved into the new building.

The building was designed by Bruce & Morgan, an architectural firm based out of Atlanta that frequently incorporated Romanesque Revival architecture into their designs: a large bell tower was located on the northeastern corner of the building, featuring an open belfry and four clocks (one on each side). Multiple round bays were featured along each side of the exterior, and a smaller, rounded tower with a pointed roof was included on the side of the building facing toward the river. On the facade near the main entrance were three arches, with the rightmost arch framing the entrance and the other two framing large windows at the base of the bell tower. The interior of the building featured offices, a law library, and storage spaces as well as the main courtroom, which was located on the second floor.

In the 1920s, the building's floorplan was expanded to the right of the main entrance, removing the smaller circular tower and adding another arched window.

=== Addition to the National Register of Historic Places ===
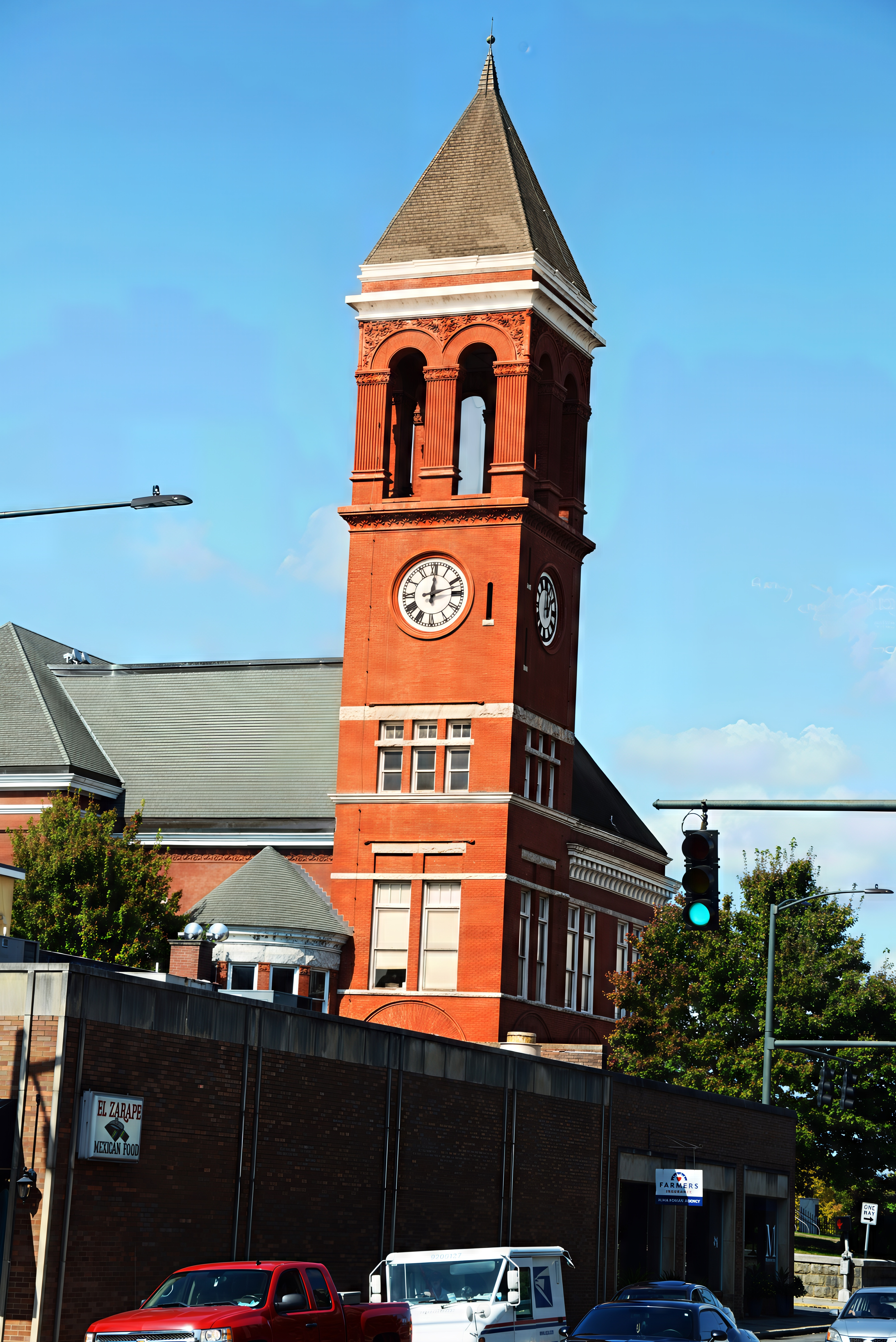
Clock tower

The courthouse remained in use from its construction until 1975, when proceedings were moved to the new courthouse located just behind the historic building. On February 2, 1980, the courthouse would be added to the National Register of Historic Places under the reference number 80001067. Because it was no longer in use for court proceedings, it was classified as an endangered building, although some of the offices on the lower floors had since been occupied by the Rome Police Department.

Although the roof had been damaged and was in need of repairs, most of the structure was noted to be in fair condition. The interior was found to be largely unchanged since its initial construction. The building would eventually become the Floyd County tax commissioners and tag office, and would remain as such until the 2026 fire.

== Fire in 2026 ==
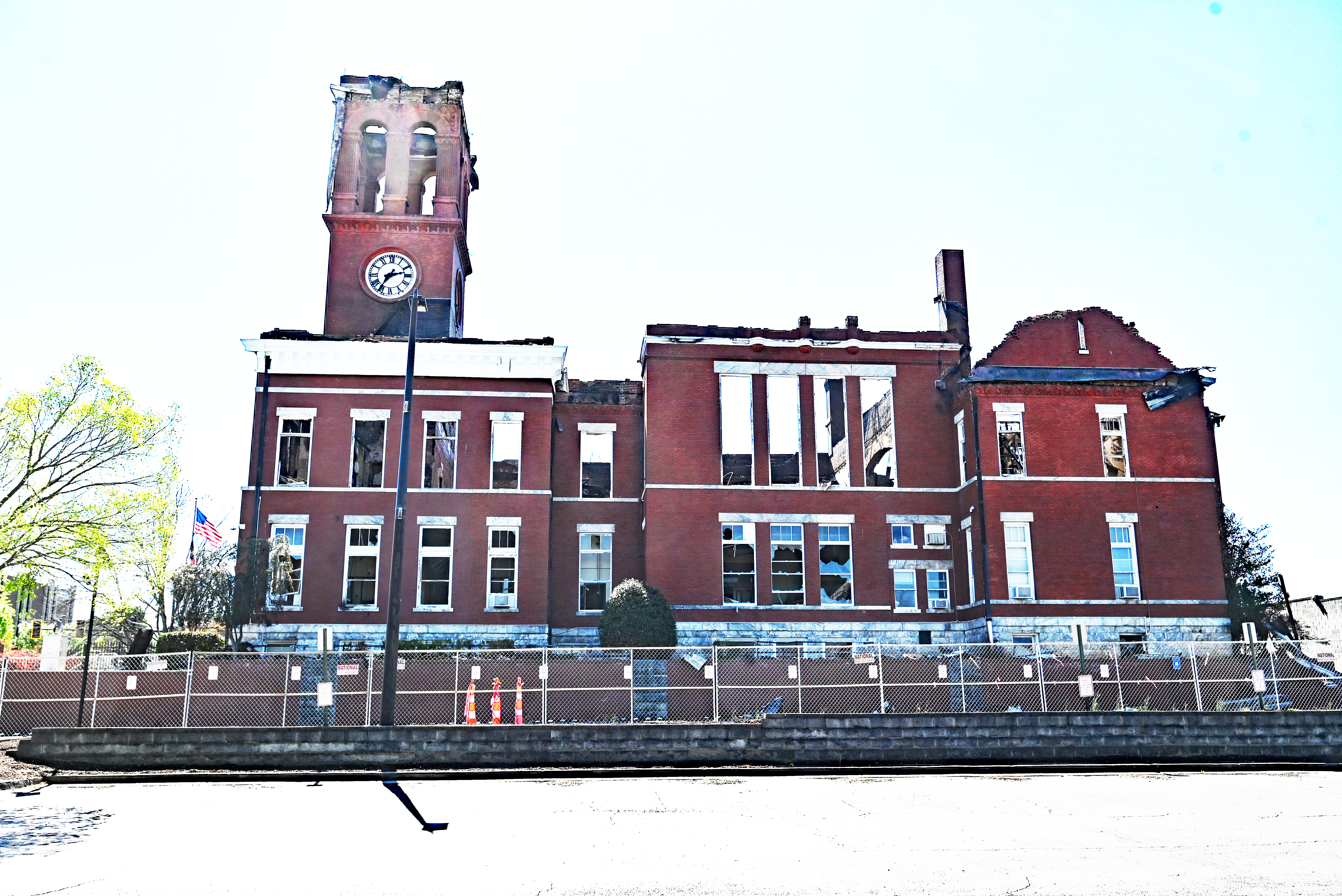
The ruins of the courthouse five days after the fire

At approximately 2:12 PM EDT on March 23, 2026, a fire broke out inside the courthouse while it was undergoing renovations. All employees within the building were safely evacuated by 2:20 PM with no reported injuries, although the fire continued to spread rapidly, fueled by the dry wood that had made up the interior and framework of the courthouse for 133 years. Eventually, fire crews were able to mostly extinguish the flames by 3:20 PM.

The roof and interior had completely collapsed during the fire, leaving only the brick facade on the exterior standing. The building would continue smoldering for up to a day afterwards. The area around the courthouse has since been evacuated and closed off out of fear of a collapse while the building itself is undergoing inspections to determine whether it poses a significant hazard or can be restored.

The courthouse currently in use (located just behind the historic courthouse) was undamaged by the fire, although it would be temporarily closed later that day. The day after the fire, Floyd County would approve emergency funding to relocate the tax and tag offices that were housed within the courthouse.
