= Blossom Hill =

Blossom Hill can mean:

- Blossom Hill (wine), a wine brand owned by Treasury Wine Estates
- Blossom Hill (VTA), a station in California
- Blossom Hill (Caltrain station), a station in San Jose, California
- Blossom Hill (Georgia), a summit in Georgia
- Blossom Hill Road, a road in California
- Blossom Hill (plantation), a plantation in Kentucky
- a school in Los Gatos Union School District, California
