= Saint Mary's Catholic Church (Rome, Georgia) =

Coordinates: 34°15′29″N 85°9′50″W

Saint Mary's Catholic Church is a parish of the Roman Catholic Archdiocese of Atlanta. The church is located at 911 North Broad Street in downtown Rome, Georgia, US.

== History ==
The first church was built in 1874 on East First Street. It was a simple wooden building with a small steeple that served the congregation for 45 years.

The church had no resident priest and was served by a visiting priest from the Atlanta Archdiocese. By the 1900s, the Catholic population outgrew the building and the congregation started seeking a new site. The present church was built in 1930 on North Broad Street at a cost of thirty thousand dollars. Designed by a Benedictine monk and architect from Belmont Abbey in North Carolina, it is inspired by Gothic forms and monastic simplicity.

== Architecture ==
The present church was designed by a Benedictine monk and architect from Belmont Abbey in North Carolina.

He chose a Gothic style with a plain stucco finish and two large wooden front doors. Over the front doors, there is a large crucifix and the coat of arms of the Archbishop of Atlanta inscribed with the words, Venite Adoremus ("O Come Let Us Adore").

The church went through a large expansion in 1998 and the original plans that called for the tall steeple and large stained glass windows were finally completed. Transepts were added to the church to double its seating capacity, a new Parish Center was constructed which contains administrative and religious education offices, and a new organ was installed.

The sanctuary was completed with the addition of the high altar. The high altar was designed and constructed in Italy in 1930 for the student chapel of Campion Jesuit High School in Prairie du Chien, Wisconsin. However, this original chapel was closed, and the altar was saved from destruction when it was purchased by St. Mary's in 1995. It was dismantled and cataloged for shipment to Saint Mary's, and in 1998, it was brought to Rome and installed by artisans specializing in marble reconstruction. The Last Supper is intricately carved in the lower half of the high altar.
