= Chieftains Museum =

House in Rome, Georgia, US that is a National Historic Landmark

- U.S. National Register of Historic Places
- U.S. National Historic Landmark
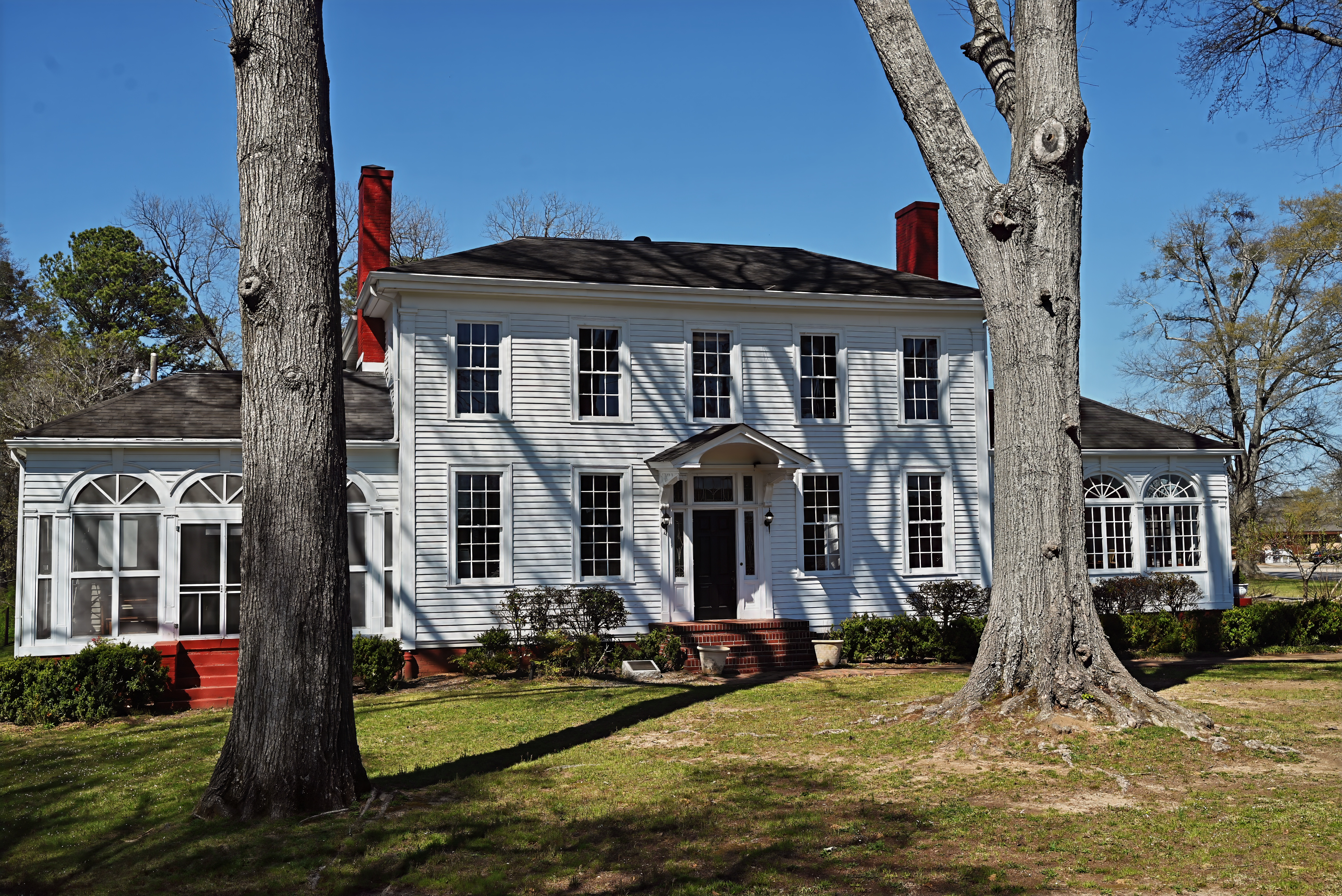
- Chieftain House

- Location within Georgia Location within the United States
- Location: 501 Riverside Pkwy NE, Rome, Georgia
- Coordinates: 34.27710°N 85.17019°W
- Built: 1819
- Architect: Major Ridge
- NRHP reference No.: 71000273

Significant dates
- Added to NRHP: April 7, 1971
- Designated NHL: November 7, 1973

Chieftains Museum, also known as the Major Ridge Home, is a two-story white frame house built around a log house of 1819 in Cherokee country (it is within present-day Rome, Georgia, US). It was the home of the Cherokee leader Major Ridge. He was notable for his role in negotiating and signing the Treaty of New Echota of 1835, which ceded the remainder of Cherokee lands in the Southeast to the United States. He was part of a minority group known as the Treaty Party, who believed that relocation was inevitable and wanted to negotiate the best deal with the United States for their people.

The chiefs had agreed they could not go to war against the United States on the removal issue, but most other Cherokee opposed Ridge and the Treaty Party. He and some other members of the Treaty Party were assassinated after most of the tribe was removed to what became the Cherokee Nation in Indian Territory, for having ceded the tribe's communal lands, as this was considered a capital crime.

== Description ==
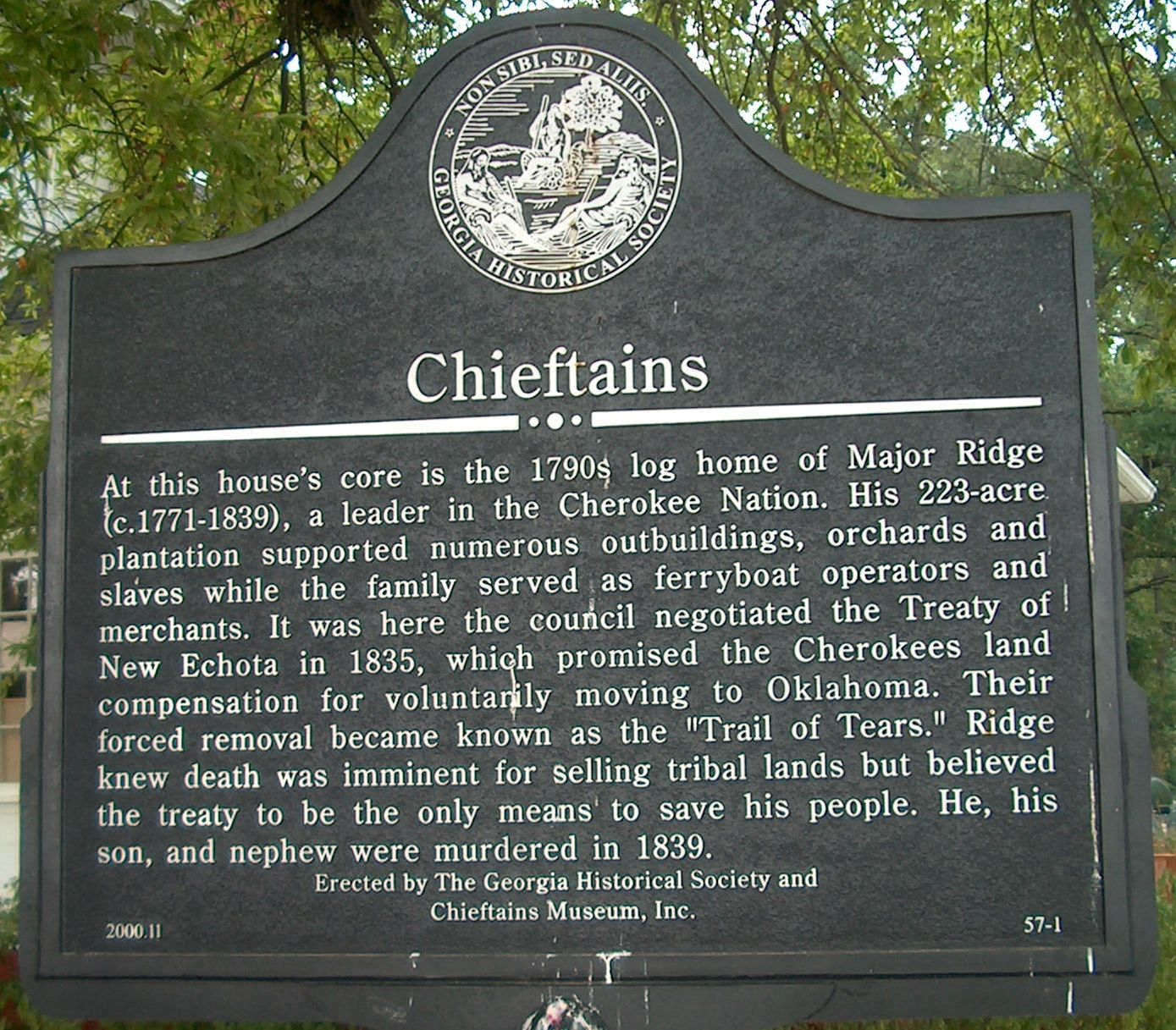
Historical marker

Major Ridge's first house here was small and built of hand-hewn logs, in the dogtrot style. He made later additions to formally enclose the dogtrot and added extensions at each side, creating a white wood-frame two-story house. This was the "Big House" of his busy 223-acre plantation, the property of which extended to the banks of the Oostanaula River, upstream of its confluence with the Etowah River, which forms the Coosa River. The house was declared a National Historic Landmark in 1973.

The Major Ridge Home was purchased for preservation by the Junior League of Rome. In 1971 it was adapted for use as a historic house museum, known as the "Chieftains Museum". In 2002 the museum was designated by the National Park Service as an official site on the "Cherokee Trail of Tears National Historic Trail," which had been established in 1987.

The building was renamed as Chieftains Museum / Major Ridge Home in his honor. The museum's exhibits focus on Major Ridge and 19th-century Cherokee life and culture. Ridge's plantation had extended to the river, which he used for travel and transport of his cotton to market. An eight-acre area along the river is now part of Riverside Park in Rome, Georgia.

== See also ==
- Cherokee Nation (19th century)
- History of Rome, Georgia
- List of National Historic Landmarks in Georgia (U.S. state)
- National Register of Historic Places listings in Floyd County, Georgia
