= Blossom Hill (Georgia) =

Mountain in Georgia, United States

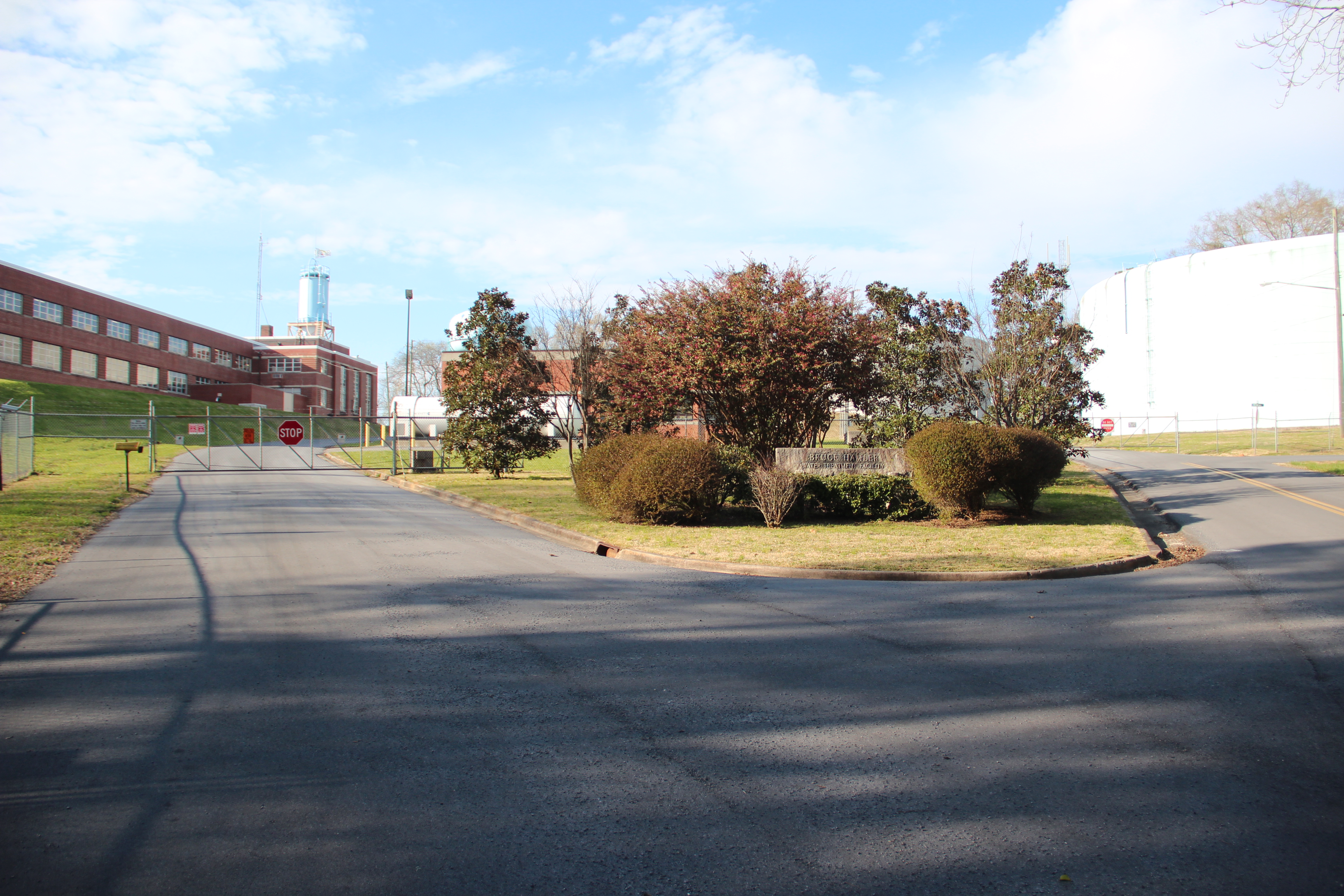
- A water treatment facility on Blossom Hill's summit

Highest point
- Elevation: 784 ft (239 m)
- Coordinates: 34.2703710°N 85.1613392°W

Geography
- Location within Georgia
- Location: Rome, Georgia, U.S.
- Topo map(s): USGS Rome North, GA

Climbing
- Easiest route: Drive

Blossom Hill is a summit in Rome, Georgia. With an elevation of 784 feet (239 m), Blossom Hill is the 901st highest summit in the state of Georgia. It is considered to be one of the Seven Hills of Rome, Georgia. Jackson Hill is located about 0.3 miles (0.48 km) south of the summit.

Blossom Hill was named from the fact a local girl picked flowers there. In 1939, the Bruce Hamler Water Treatment Plant, named for a former city manager, was constructed on the hill.
