= DeSoto Theater =

Theater in Rome, Georgia, U.S.

Coordinates: 34.25583°N 85.16923°W

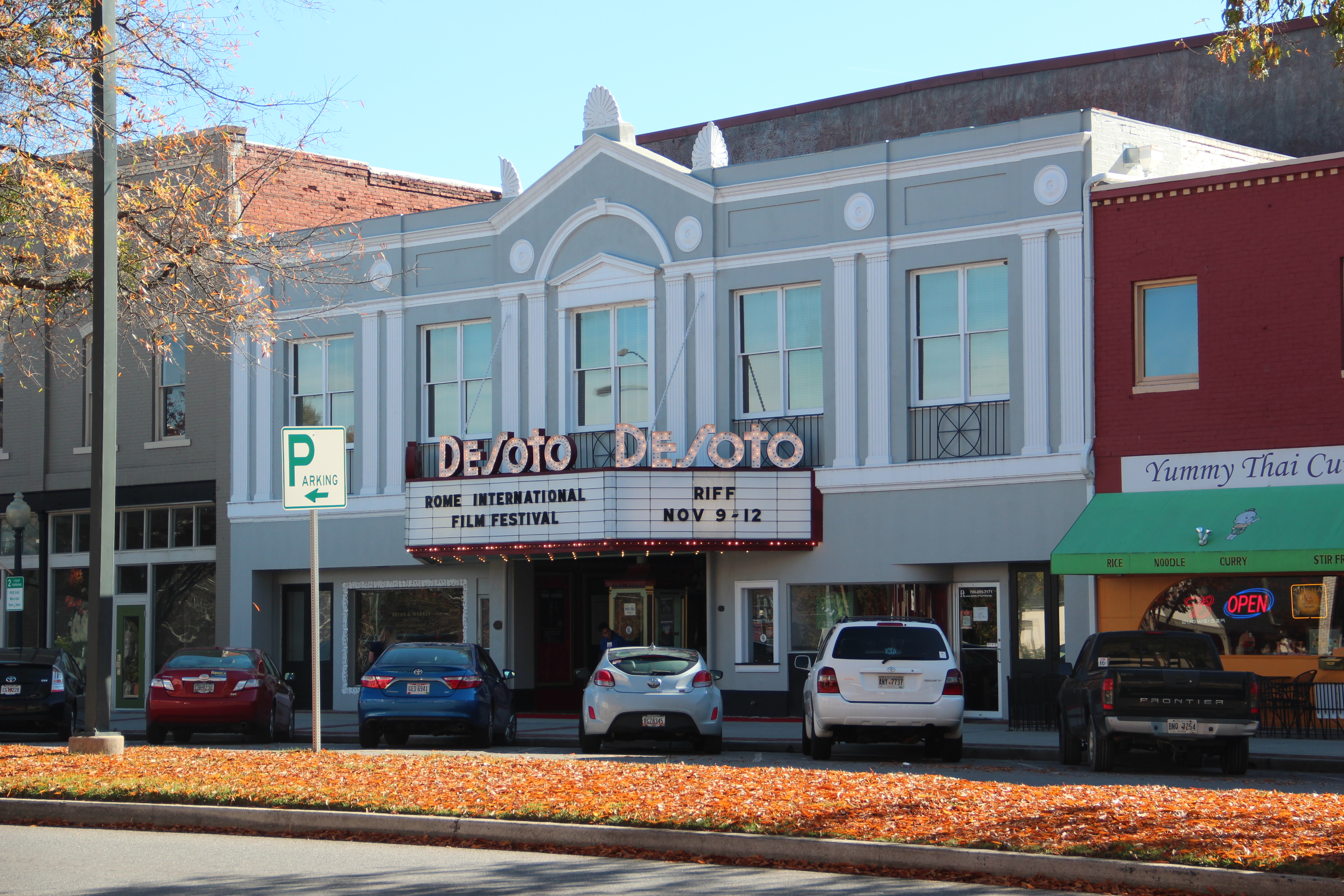
DeSoto Theater in 2017

The DeSoto Theatre is a theater in downtown Rome, Georgia, in the United States. The DeSoto Theatre was the first theater in the southeast to display sound film. It is currently owned by the Historic DeSoto Theatre Foundation, a nonprofit organization created by the building's former owner and current resident theatre group, the Rome Little Theatre. The previous building was home to the Freedmen's Bureau of Rome. In early 1908 O. C. Lam, the owner of Lam Amusement Company, laid plans to construct a new movie theater in downtown Rome, Georgia. Lam wanted to build a movie palace, a luxurious theater modeled after New York's Roxy. Lam purchased a section of prime real estate on the main street of downtown Rome for $37,000.

The building's exterior and Georgian interior stylishly housed a number of recent movie palace innovations. Designed as a "talkie" theater, it the first venue in the South to be designed and built for sound pictures. Rome's new house boasted a Vitaphone sound system. And, the theater was heated and cooled by an innovative blower-fan air conditioning and tubular boiler system. Additionally, the theater was equipped with state-of-the-art fire safety equipment. Fitted with many exits, the theater could be emptied in two minutes.

Lam named his new movie palace for Hernando DeSoto, who was thought by many historians to have passed through the area that is now Rome in 1600. DeSoto was completed at a cost of $110,000 and opened in August 1927. The theater seated 1,500, making it one of the seven largest movie venues in Georgia at the time. The theater was an instant success and the pride of Rome. The DeSoto was one of the main sources of entertainment for Northwest Georgia and Northeast Alabama for the next thirty years.

== The Rome Little Theatre and the Historic DeSoto Theatre Foundation ==
In 1982 the DeSoto closed as a movie theater, but soon reopened as the venue for Rome's local amateur theater group. The Rome Little Theatre has staged dozens of plays in the years it has performed at the DeSoto, and the theater is one of the venues for the annual Rome International Film Festival. The Historic DeSoto Theatre Foundation now manages the facility, and the DeSoto continues to be a source of entertainment in downtown Rome. The DeSoto still retains its Art-Deco marquee, French mirrored entrance hall, and Georgian interior design.

== Today ==
Today the DeSoto Theatre, managed by the Historic DeSoto Theatre Foundation, is undergoing preservation efforts to restore the theatre to its former splendor. Funding must be secured to aid in these endeavors. This financial assistance could come in the form of private donations, government funding, or preservation endowments.
