= Chiaha Harvest Fair =

Annual arts festival in Rome, Georgia, US

Coordinates: 34.268861°N 85.171830°W

The Chiaha Harvest Fair is an annual arts festival at Ridge Ferry Park in Rome, Georgia, United States. It takes place on the banks of the Oostanaula River with profits going towards supporting art education in the Rome and Floyd County area.

The first Chiaha fair took place in 1964 with only a handful of artists. The festival began as a way for local artists to get together and sell their artwork. Today, the festival has grown to consist of over 120 artists and craftsmen from many states and over 10,000 visitors annually. The Chiaha Arts and Crafts Guild is the main sponsor for the event which helps to raise money for local area art projects and scholarships for Rome's three colleges.

This fair went on hiatus in 2020.
