= Jackson Hill (Georgia) =

Coordinates: 34.2664822°N 85.1632836°W

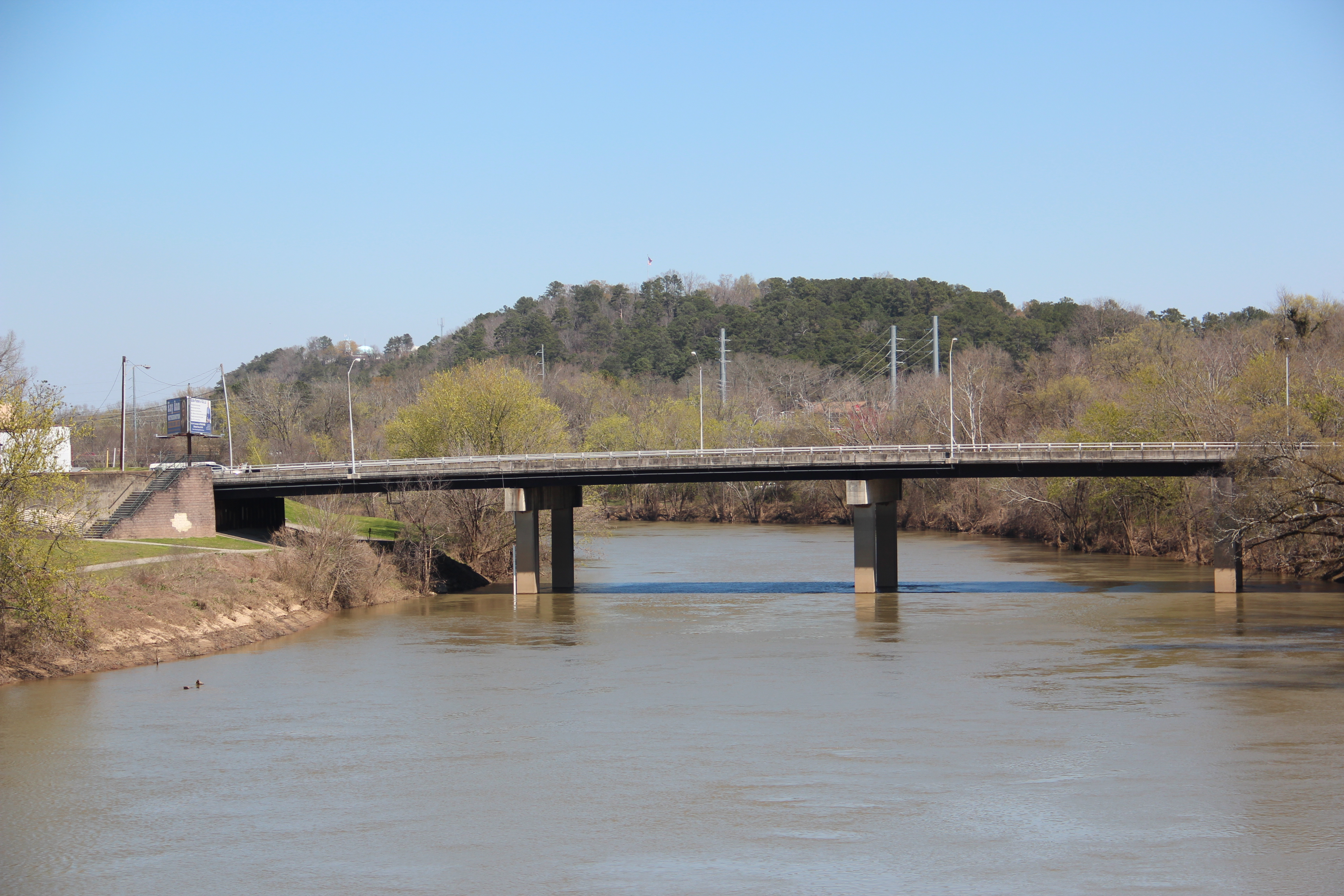
Jackson Hill downtown Rome, Georgia

Jackson Hill is a summit in Rome, Georgia. With an elevation of 751 feet (229 m), Jackson Hill is the 905th highest summit in the state of Georgia. The hill considered to be one of the Seven Hills of Rome, Georgia.

Jackson Hill was named for the local Jackson family, the original owners.
