= Clock Tower (Rome, Georgia) =

Historic place in Georgia, US

- Rome Clock Tower
- U.S. National Register of Historic Places
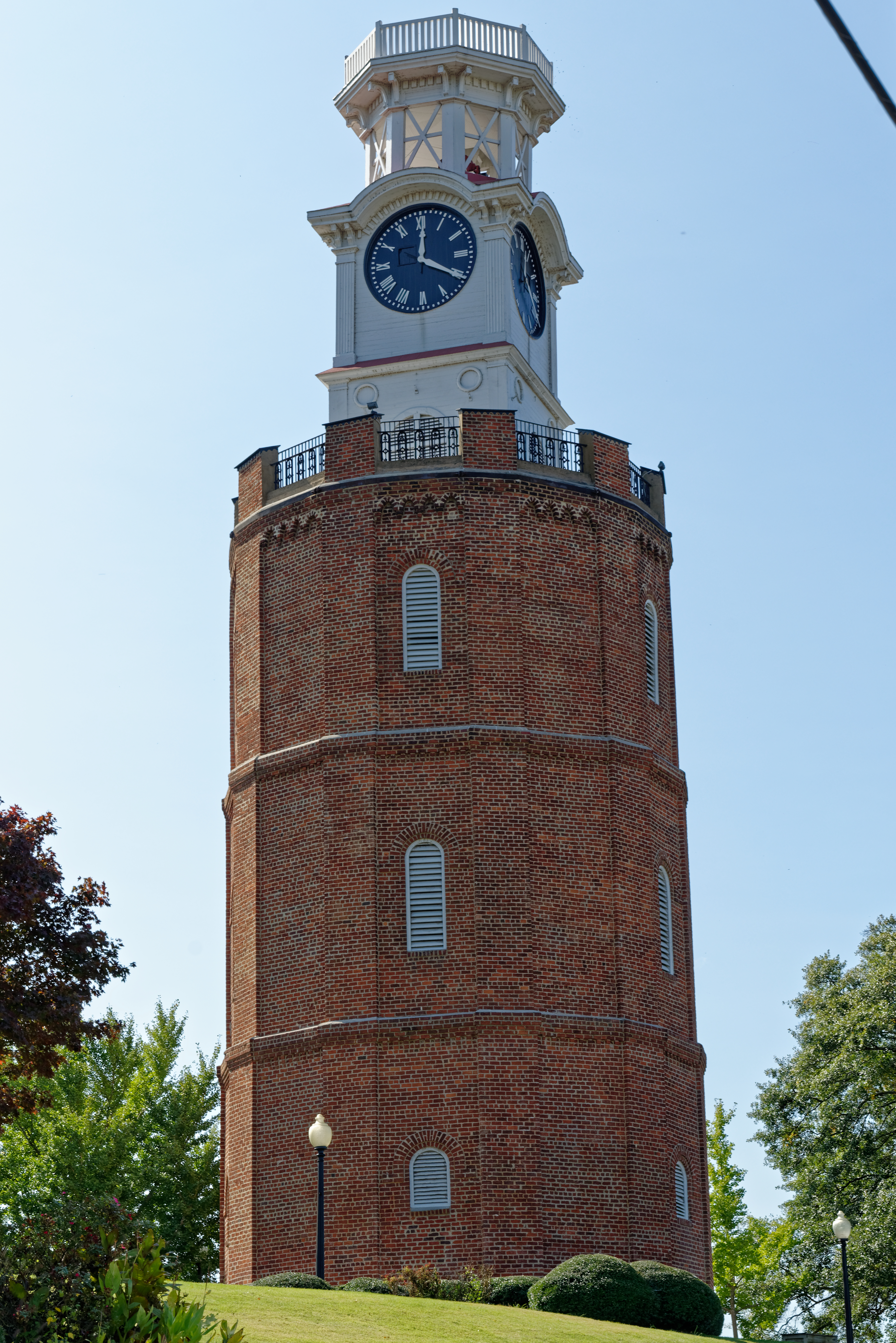

- Location within Georgia Location within the United States
- Location: Off GA 101, Rome, Georgia
- Coordinates: 34°15′13″N 85°10′9″W
- Area: less than one acre
- Built: 1871
- Architect: John W. Noble, Noble Bros.
- NRHP reference No.: 80001068
- Added to NRHP: February 8, 1980

The Clock Tower in Rome, Georgia is one of the oldest landmarks in the city. The Clock Tower is located at the summit of Clock Tower Hill (also known as Neely Hill) one of the Seven Hills of Rome.

== History ==
The clock tower was built in 1871 under the direction of James Noble, Jr. and his family. It was originally built to hold the 250,000 gallons of water that would serve the city. Sheets of iron 10 feet long were used to build the frame of the tank, and red bricks surround it. The tank itself stood 63 feet tall and 26 feet wide. Atop the water tank, there is a bell and four clock faces located within a structure that stands 41 feet tall. Both the clock and bell were added in 1872, just one year after the original tower was built. The clocks were made by E. Howard Clock Company. Each face is nine feet in diameter, the hour hand is three feet, six inches long, and the minute hand is four feet, three inches long. The bell within the clock tower is made of genuine bronze and measures 40 inches wide. Engraved on the rim is the date 1872. With the addition of the clocks and bell the clock tower now stands 104 feet tall and can be seen from almost any part of downtown Rome. By the 1890s the tower could no longer support the city's water needs, and ceased to operate as a water tower. After the closing of the tower, it began to fall into a state of mild disrepair. It stayed in that state throughout the 20th Century.

== Recently ==
The Rome Jaycees raised over $80,000 in 1986 in order to provide landscaping on top of Neely Hill around the clock tower. The historical clock tower is now a museum, which opened in 1995, once again with the help of the Rome Jaycees. The inside of the water tank now displays works of art by local artist Chuck Smultz. Also inside are the 107 steps spiraling around the tower to the top.
