= Livingston, Georgia =

Unincorporated community in Georgia, U.S.

Coordinates: 34°12′46″N 85°20′55″W

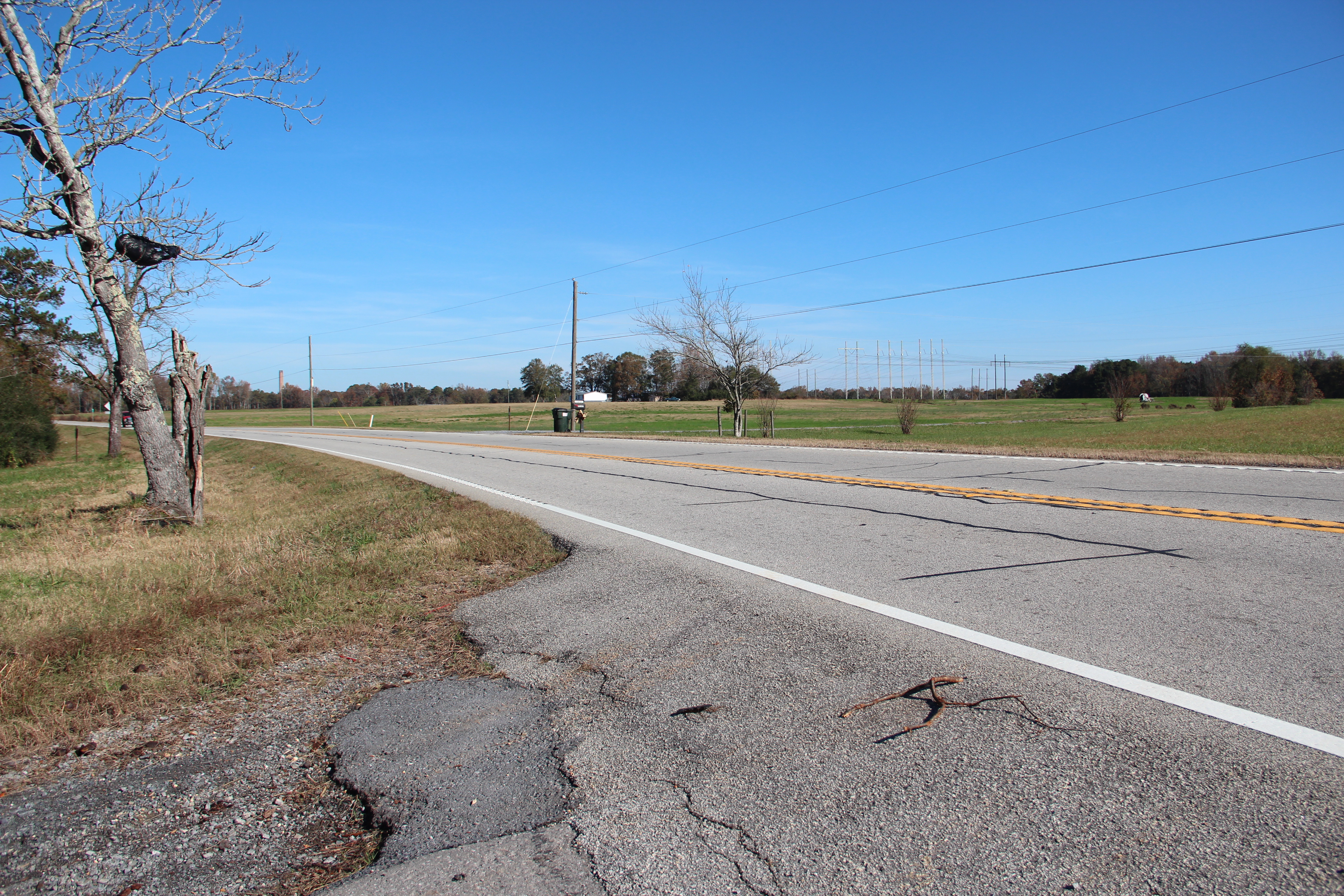
Georgia State Route 100 in Livingston

Livingston is an unincorporated community in Floyd County, in the U.S. state of Georgia.

== History ==
A post office called Livingston was established in 1834, and remained in operation until 1901. The community most likely was named after Leonidas F. Livingston, a U.S. Representative from Georgia.
