= National Register of Historic Places listings in Merrick County, Nebraska =

Location of Merrick County in Nebraska

Merrick County, Nebraska, United States, has nine properties and districts listed on the National Register of Historic Places.

The locations of National Register properties and districts for which the latitude and longitude coordinates are included below may be seen in a map.

This National Park Service list is complete through NPS recent listings posted October 30, 2026.

== Current listings ==
	Name on the Register	Image	Date listed	Location	City or town	Description
1	Cahow Barber Shop	Cahow Barber Shop	January 12, 1984 (#84002493)	SW. Main St. 41°01′26″N 98°09′30″W	Chapman	
2	Clarksville Township Carnegie Library	Clarksville Township Carnegie Library	February 24, 2021 (#100006194)	108 West Amity St. 41°13′00″N 97°50′17″W	Clarks	
3	Martha Ellen Auditorium	Martha Ellen Auditorium	September 28, 1988 (#88000944)	706 C Ave. 41°06′53″N 98°00′09″W	Central City	
4	Heber Hord House	Heber Hord House	December 7, 1987 (#87002096)	1505 16th St. 41°06′58″N 97°59′18″W	Central City	
5	Wright Morris Boyhood House	Wright Morris Boyhood House	October 22, 1980 (#80002457)	304 D St. 41°07′02″N 98°01′38″W	Central City	
6	Nelson Farm	Nelson Farm	August 26, 2009 (#09000650)	1139 M Rd. 41°06′22″N 98°05′27″W	Central City	
7	Palmer Site	Palmer Site	October 15, 1966 (#66000447)	Address Restricted	Palmer	Extends into Howard County
8	Patterson Law Office	Patterson Law Office	March 13, 1979 (#79001451)	1517 18th St. 41°06′51″N 97°59′57″W	Central City	
9	Riverside Park Dance Pavilion	Riverside Park Dance Pavilion	December 31, 1998 (#98001564)	Riverside Rd. in Riverside Park; 41°05′57″N 97°57′58″W	Central City	

== Former listing ==
	Name on the Register	Image	Date listed	Date removed	Location	City or town	Description
1	Merrick County Courthouse	Merrick County Courthouse	January 10, 1990 (#89002211)	January 2, 2014	18th St. between 15th and 16th Aves. 41°06′50″N 97°59′57″W	Central City	

== See also ==
- List of National Historic Landmarks in Nebraska
- National Register of Historic Places listings in Nebraska
