= Marvin Lautenschlager =

American politician (1920–1968)

Member of the Nebraska Legislature from the 30th district
- In office January 1, 1957 – January 1, 1963
- Preceded by: Joseph D. Martin
- Succeeded by: Ted Reeves

Personal details
- Born: November 8, 1920 Palmer, Nebraska
- Died: January 7, 1968 (aged 47) near Wolbach, Nebraska
- Cause of death: Plane crash
- Party: Republican
- Spouse: Violet J. Derheim (m. 1946)
- Children: 5
- Occupation: Real estate broker

Marvin Lautenschlager (November 8, 1920 – January 7, 1968) was a Republican politician from Nebraska who served as a member of the Nebraska Legislature from the 30th district from 1957 to 1963. He died in a plane crash near Wolbach, Nebraska, in 1968.

== Early life ==
Lautenschlager was born in Palmer, Nebraska, in 1920, and graduated from St. Paul High School. He attended the St. Paul Business College and Santa Monica Tech in Santa Monica, California. Lautenschlager served in the military during World War II, and returned to Nebraska and settled in Grand Island. He was the field director of the Hall County Farm Bureau and worked as a real estate broker.

== Nebraska Legislature ==
In 1956, State Senator Joseph D. Martin declined to run for re-election to a third term. Lautenschlager ran to succeed Martin in the 30th district, which was based in Hall and Merrick counties. In the nonpartisan primary, Lautenschlager faced plumbing contractor Edward Bell and former Hall County Attorney Lloyd Kelly. Lautenschlager narrowly placed second in the primary, winning 38 percent of the vote to Kelly's 40 percent, and they proceeded to the general election. Lautenschlager defeated Kelly, winning 58 percent of the vote to Kelly's 42 percent.

Lautenschlager ran for re-election to a second term in 1958. He was challenged for re-election by former Grand Island Mayor Oren Cunningham. Lautenschlager placed first in the primary, winning 54 percent of the vote to Cunningham's 46 percent. In the general election, Lautenschlager defeated Cunningham by a wide margin, winning re-election, 59-41 percent.

In 1960, Lautenschlager ran for a third term, and was challenged by farmer Fritz Holtorf. Lautenschlager narrowly placed first in the primary election, winning 53 percent of the vote to Holtorf's 47 percent, and they advanced to the general election. Lautenschlager ultimately defeated Holtorf, winning 55 percent of the vote.

Lautenschlager sought a fourth term in 1962. During the campaign, he faced controversy over a lawsuit filed by former clients who argued that he had breached his fiduciary duty to them. Lautenschlager had been held liable for breaching his duty to the clients when he acted as the broker for their land, sold it to his uncle for an artificially low price, and then personally profited when his uncle re-sold the land for a higher price. On May 4, 1962, the state Real Estate Commission revoked Lautenschlager's real estate license, citing the "violat[ion] [of] his obligation as a real estate broker." During Lautenschlager's re-election campaign, local Republican Party officials worried that, if he were to be nominated at the primary election, his seat might be lost in the general election. He was challenged by farmer Ted Reeves, Grand Island City Councilman George Clayton, and former Hall County Attorney William Blackburn. In the primary election, Lautenschlager placed third, winning 25 percent of the vote, while Clayton and Reeves advanced to the general election.

== Death ==
On January 7, 1968, Lautenschlager was a passenger on a single-engine plane participating in a coyote hunt when the plane crashed near Wolbach. The crash killed both Lautenschlager and the pilot, Max Scarborough.
