= Ted Reeves =

American politician (1905–1988)

Member of the Nebraska Legislature from the 30th district
- In office January 1, 1963 – January 5, 1965
- Preceded by: Marvin Lautenschlager
- Succeeded by: Fred Carstens (redistricted)

Personal details
- Born: March 17, 1905 Central City, Nebraska
- Died: January 20, 1988 (aged 82) near Central City, Nebraska
- Cause of death: Car accident
- Party: Republican (until 1969); Democratic (1969–1988)
- Spouse: Portia Marsh (m. 1929)
- Children: 4 (Don, Virginia, Kathleen, Ladd)
- Occupation: Farmer

Theodore C. Reeves (March 17, 1905 – January 20, 1988) was an American politician from Nebraska who served as a member of the Nebraska Legislature from the 30th district from 1963 to 1965. He was initially a Republican but switched to the Democratic Party in 1969. He died in a car accident near Central City, Nebraska.

== Early life ==
Reeves was born in Central City, Nebraska, in 1905. He graduated from Chapman High School, and operated his family farm in Central City.

In 1948, Reeves ran for the Merrick County Board of Supervisors from the 6th district, but was defeated by L. H. Aurand in the Republican primary.

Reeves was appointed to the Nebraska Mid-State Reclamation District in 1953, following the death of director Lee Ferris. He was elected to a full six-year term in 1954, and re-elected in 1960.

== Nebraska Legislature ==
In 1962, Reeves ran for the state legislature from the 30th district, challenging incumbent State Senator Marvin Lautenschlager for re-election. Reeves was one of several candidates to file against Lautenschlager, a real estate broker who had attracted negative attention for breaching his fiduciary duty to a client. Grand Island City Councilman George Clayton and former Hall County Attorney William Blackburn also challenged Lautenschlager. Reeves narrowly placed first in the primary, winning 27 percent of the vote and receiving 10 more votes than Clayton, who placed second. In the general election, Reeves narrowly defeated Clayton, winning 51 percent of the vote to Clayton's 49 percent.

Following redistricting, Reeves ran for re-election in the 34th district, which included Hamilton, Merrick, and Polk counties. He was challenged by fellow State Senator Maurice Kremer, who previously represented the 25th district. In the primary election, Kremer placed first over Reeves, winning 56 percent of the vote to Reeves's 44 percent. In the general election, Kremer defeated Reeves, winning 57–43 percent.

== Post-legislative career ==
In 1969, Reeves switched to the Democratic Party., citing his opposition to the Vietnam War and the refusal of Republican U.S. Senators Carl Curtis and Roman Hruska to oppose the development of an anti-ballistic missile system.

Reeves ran for Congress in 1972 in the 3rd district, seeking to challenge Republican Congressman David Martin. Though Reeves was considered the "favorite" in the primary, he ultimately lost to farmer Warren Fitzgerald, winning 46 percent of the vote to Fitzgerald's 54 percent.

== Death ==
Reeves died on January 20, 1988, in a car accident near Central City.
