= Lautenschlager =

Lautenschlager or Lautenschläger (German and Alsatian: occupational name for a player on the lute) is a surname. Notable people with the surname include:

== Lautenschlager ==
- Christian Lautenschlager (1877–1954), German Grand Prix motor racing champion
- Joshua Lautenschlager Kaul, or Josh Kaul (born 1981), American lawyer, politician
- Marvin Lautenschlager (1920–1968), American politician from Nebraska
- Peg Lautenschlager (1955–2018), American attorney and politician from Wisconsin
- Rube Lautenschlager (1915–1992), American basketball player

== Lautenschläger ==
- Carl Lautenschläger (1888–1962), German chemist and physician
- Martina Lautenschläger (born 1988), Swiss professional tennis player
- Sabine Lautenschläger (born 1964), German jurist and vice-president of the Deutsche Bundesbank
- Silke Lautenschläger (born 1968), German politician (CDU)

== See also ==
- 30827 Lautenschläger, a minor planet named after Manfred Lautenschläger. See List of minor planets: 30001–31000#30801–30900
- Manfred Lautenschläger-Stiftung, a German charitable foundation
- Marschollek, Lautenschläger und Partner AG or MLP SE, a German corporation providing financial services, especially personal financial planning advisory
