= Palmer Site =

- U.S. National Register of Historic Places
- U.S. National Historic Landmark
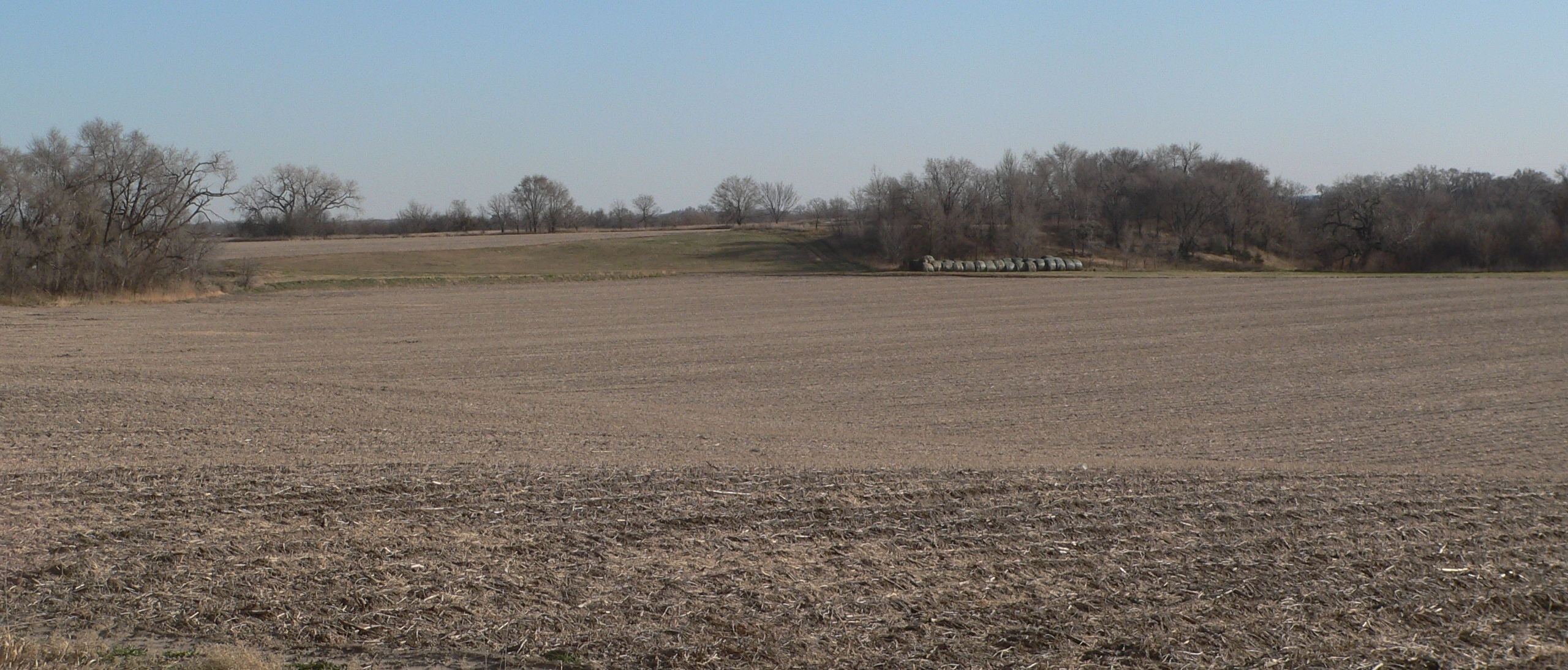
- Vicinity of site, 2013
- Nearest city: Palmer, Nebraska
- NRHP reference No.: 66000447

Significant dates
- Added to NRHP: October 15, 1966
- Designated NHL: July 19, 1964

The Palmer Site, also known as the Skidi Pawnee Village and designated by the Smithsonian trinomial 25HW1, is a prehistoric and historic archaeological site near Palmer, Nebraska in Howard and Merrick Counties. The site is a Native American habitation site associated with the Skidi people, a branch of the Pawnee people, which may have been documented by an American exploratory expedition led by Stephen H. Long in 1820. It was declared a National Historic Landmark in 1964. The site is located on private property.

The Palmer Site's primary period of occupation is believed to have been in the early 19th century. Its features include 120 lodge sites and a feature interpreted as a council circle, as well as a Native American burial ground, from which several burials were removed or relocated due to nearby road construction.

The site was recorded by at least three separate 19th-century exploratory expeditions. Stephen H. Long's 1819-20 expedition along the Loup River almost certainly encountered the village, describing its location and that of several other villages. Another expedition visited the village in 1833, and an 1844 expedition documented that it was abandoned. This village is believed to have been the site of the notorious Morning Star ceremony, a Skidi custom of human sacrifice. It was also probably the home of Petalesharo, a Pawnee warrior of famously interrupted one of those ceremonies by rescuing that year's victim, a Comanche girl. Petalesharo is believed to be buried here.

== See also ==
- List of National Historic Landmarks in Nebraska
- National Register of Historic Places listings in Merrick County, Nebraska
- National Register of Historic Places listings in Howard County, Nebraska
