= Chapman, Nebraska =

- Village
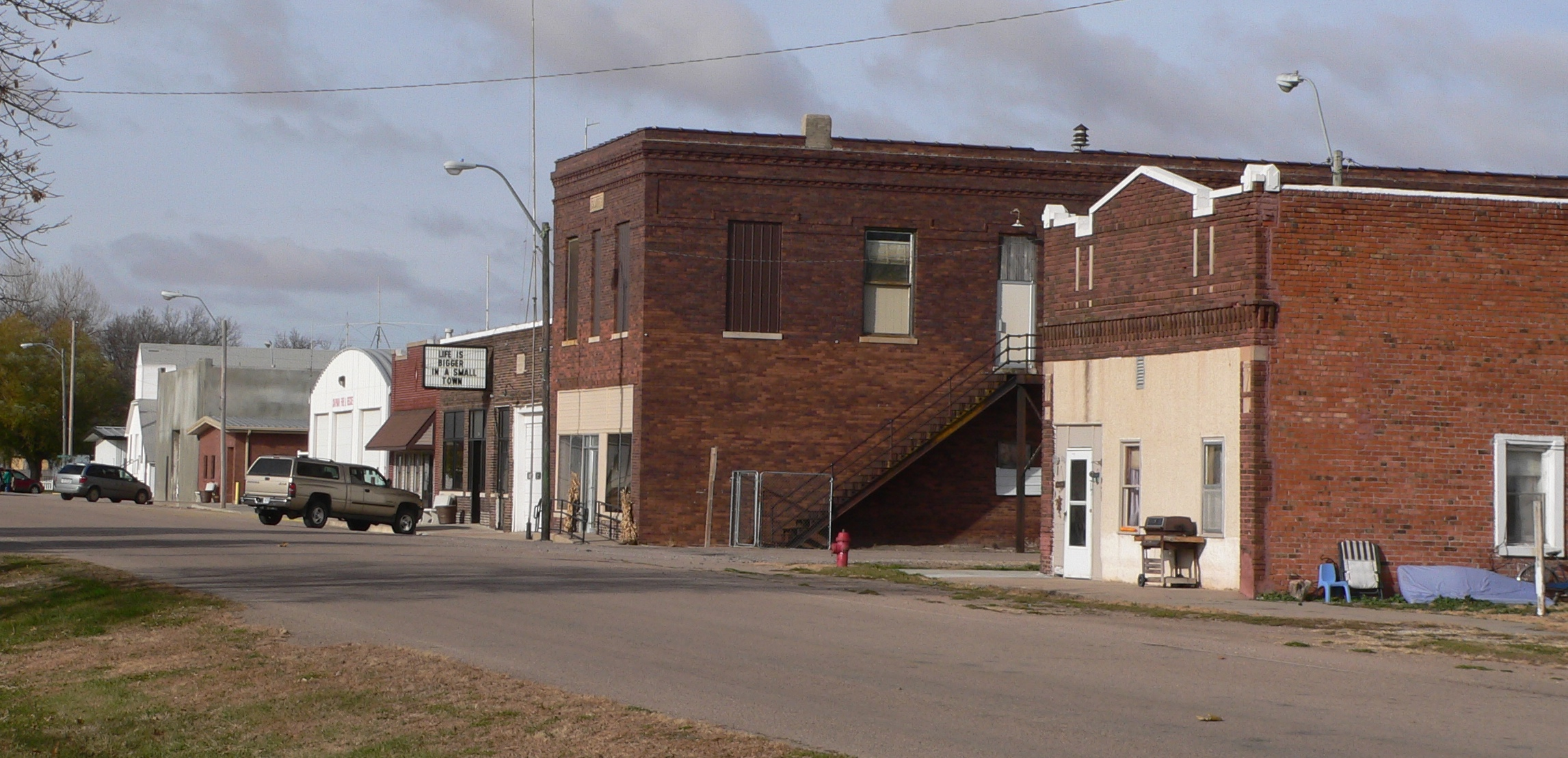
- Downtown Chapman: 9th Street

- Location in Merrick County and the state of Nebraska
- Coordinates: 41°01′24″N 98°09′34″W
- Country: United States
- State: Nebraska
- County: Merrick

Area
  - Total: 0.45 sq mi (1.16 km^{2})
  - Land: 0.45 sq mi (1.16 km^{2})
  - Water: 0 sq mi (0.00 km^{2})
- Elevation: 1,765 ft (538 m)

Population (2020)
  - Total: 260
  - Density: 582.4/sq mi (224.86/km^{2})
- Time zone: UTC-6 (Central (CST))
  - Summer (DST): UTC-5 (CDT)
- ZIP code: 68827
- Area code: 308
- FIPS code: 31-08780
- GNIS feature ID: 2397603

Chapman is a village in Merrick County, Nebraska, United States. The population was 260 at the 2020 census. It is part of the Grand Island metropolitan area.

== History ==
Chapman got its start in the 1860s, following construction of the railroad through the territory. The new railroad town was named for a railroad official. The first building was built in Chapman in 1871.

The Cahow Barber Shop in Chapman is listed in the National Register of Historic Places.

== Geography ==
Chapman is in southwestern Merrick County along U.S. Route 30, which runs along the southeast edge of town. Central City, the county seat, is 10 miles (16 km) to the northeast, and Grand Island is 12 miles (19 km) to the southwest.

According to the U.S. Census Bureau, the village of Chapman has a total area of 0.45 square miles (1.17 km^{2}), all land. The Platte River passes 2 miles (3 km) to the southeast of the village.

== Demographics ==
Historical population
| Census | Pop. | Note | %± |
|---|---|---|---|
| 1900 | 209 | | — |
| 1910 | 266 | | 27.3% |
| 1920 | 224 | | −15.8% |
| 1930 | 283 | | 26.3% |
| 1940 | 204 | | −27.9% |
| 1950 | 274 | | 34.3% |
| 1960 | 303 | | 10.6% |
| 1970 | 371 | | 22.4% |
| 1980 | 349 | | −5.9% |
| 1990 | 292 | | −16.3% |
| 2000 | 341 | | 16.8% |
| 2010 | 287 | | −15.8% |
| 2020 | 260 | | −9.4% |
U.S. Decennial Census

=== 2010 census ===
As of the census of 2010, there were 287 people, 115 households, and 78 families residing in the village. The population density was 637.8 inhabitants per square mile (246.3/km^{2}). There were 133 housing units at an average density of 295.6 per square mile (114.1/km^{2}). The racial makeup of the village was 96.9% White, 0.7% African American, 1.0% Native American, 0.3% from other races, and 1.0% from two or more races. Hispanic or Latino of any race were 3.5% of the population.

There were 115 households, of which 33.0% had children under the age of 18 living with them, 46.1% were married couples living together, 11.3% had a female householder with no husband present, 10.4% had a male householder with no wife present, and 32.2% were non-families. 21.7% of all households were made up of individuals, and 12.1% had someone living alone who was 65 years of age or older. The average household size was 2.50 and the average family size was 2.83.

The median age in the village was 40.6 years. 24.4% of residents were under the age of 18; 7.6% were between the ages of 18 and 24; 25.8% were from 25 to 44; 26.5% were from 45 to 64; and 15.7% were 65 years of age or older. The gender makeup of the village was 49.5% male and 50.5% female.

=== 2000 census ===
As of the census of 2000, there were 341 people, 131 households, and 94 families residing in the village. The population density was 759.5 inhabitants per square mile (293.2/km^{2}). There were 144 housing units at an average density of 320.7 per square mile (123.8/km^{2}). The racial makeup of the village was 97.65% White, 1.17% Native American, 0.29% from other races, and 0.88% from two or more races. Hispanic or Latino of any race were 2.05% of the population.

There were 131 households, out of which 39.7% had children under the age of 18 living with them, 62.6% were married couples living together, 8.4% had a female householder with no husband present, and 27.5% were non-families. 22.1% of all households were made up of individuals, and 4.6% had someone living alone who was 65 years of age or older. The average household size was 2.60 and the average family size was 3.09.

In the village, the population was spread out, with 31.4% under the age of 18, 6.2% from 18 to 24, 29.6% from 25 to 44, 21.1% from 45 to 64, and 11.7% who were 65 years of age or older. The median age was 32 years. For every 100 females, there were 103.0 males. For every 100 females age 18 and over, there were 103.5 males.

As of 2000 the median income for a household in the village was $29,375, and the median income for a family was $31,458. Males had a median income of $23,125 versus $17,500 for females. The per capita income for the village was $12,519. About 12.5% of families and 9.8% of the population were below the poverty line, including 12.3% of those under age 18 and none of those age 65 or over.
