= The Field of Vision =

1956 novel by Wright Morris

- First edition cover
- Author: Wright Morris
- Language: English
- Publisher: Harcourt, Brace
- Publication date: 1956
- Publication place: United States
- Media type: Print (hardback & paperback)
- Pages: 251 pp

The Field of Vision is a 1956 novel by Wright Morris, written in the style of high modernism. It won the U.S. National Book Award for Fiction in 1957.
