= Lone Tree Monument =

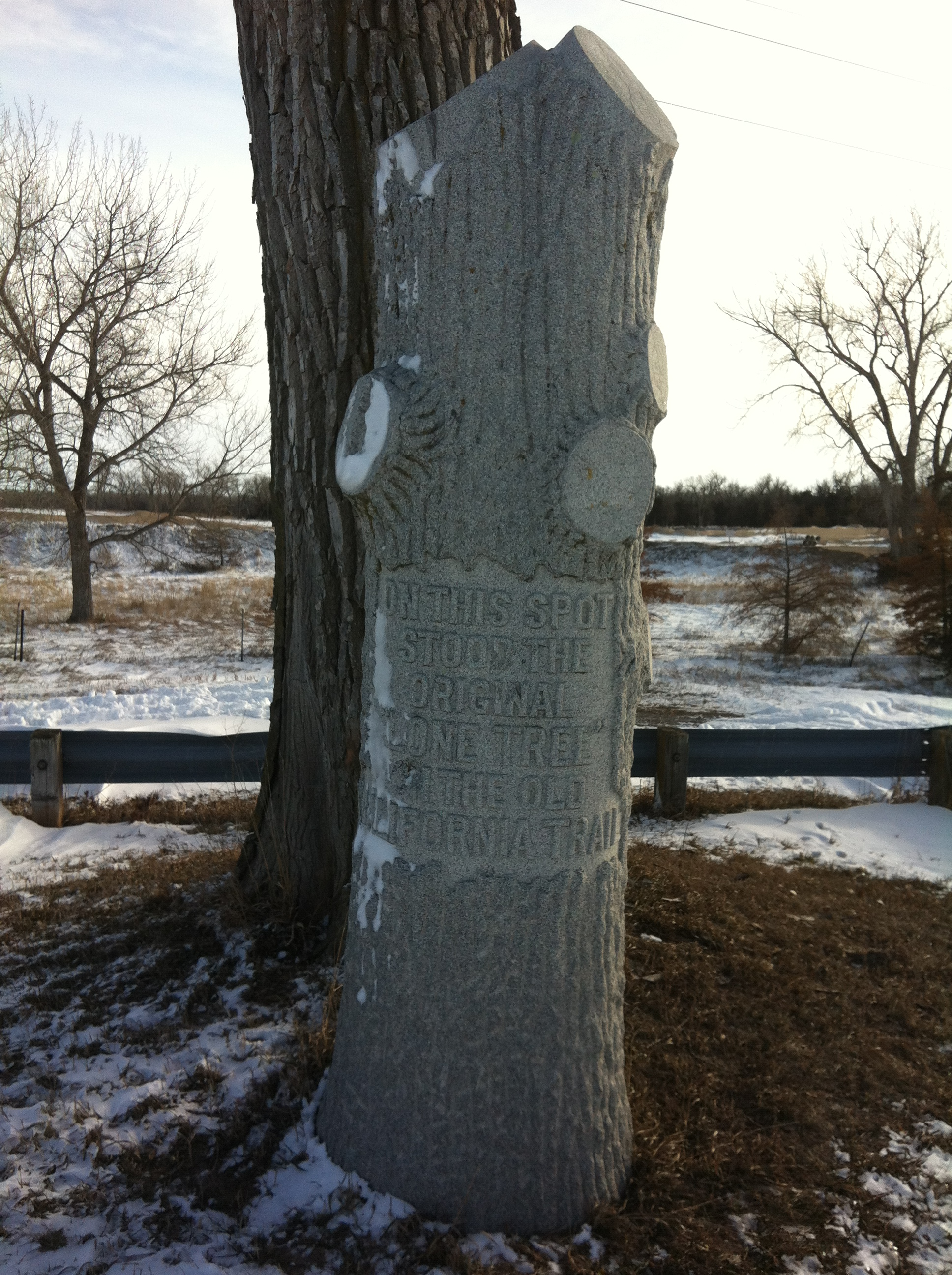
- Interactive map of Lone Tree Monument
- Location: Central City, Nebraska
- Coordinates: 41°4′26.4″N 98°1′22.2″W
- Designer: Residents of Merrick County (1911)
- Material: granite
- Height: 10 feet
- Completion date: August 9, 1911
- Dedicated to: Lone Tree
- Behind the granite monument stands a live cottonwood tree signifying the original cottonwood tree.

The Lone Tree Monument is on the site once occupied by a large tree in central Nebraska. Native Americans held council under it, early pioneers used it as a landmark, and it was the first official name of the county seat of Merrick county. It is marked as a historical location by the Nebraska State Historical Society.

== History ==
Lone Tree was a solitary cottonwood tree, which stood on the north side of the Platte River about three miles southwest of where Central City is located. The trunk of the tree was about 10 to 12 feet (3.0 to 3.7 m) in circumference at the base and was about 50 feet (15 m) tall. It was a landmark, it was claimed, which could be seen for 20 miles (32 km) across the prairie by early travelers.

Native Americans knew the tree and named it (though the name is not known) before the pioneers came. Legend has it that Native American chiefs held council under its shade.

It was a landmark for pioneers as early as 1833. In 1858, it was selected by Western Stage Co. as the site for the Lone Tree Station. From 1860 to 1861, the Western Stage Company station was built and operating. The huge cottonwood tree marked its location, which was operated by Mary Hilton from 1860 to 1861.

In 1858, the Nebraska Territorial Legislature established Merrick County and designated "Elvira" as its mythical county seat located under Lone Tree near present day Central City.

=== 1865 storm ===
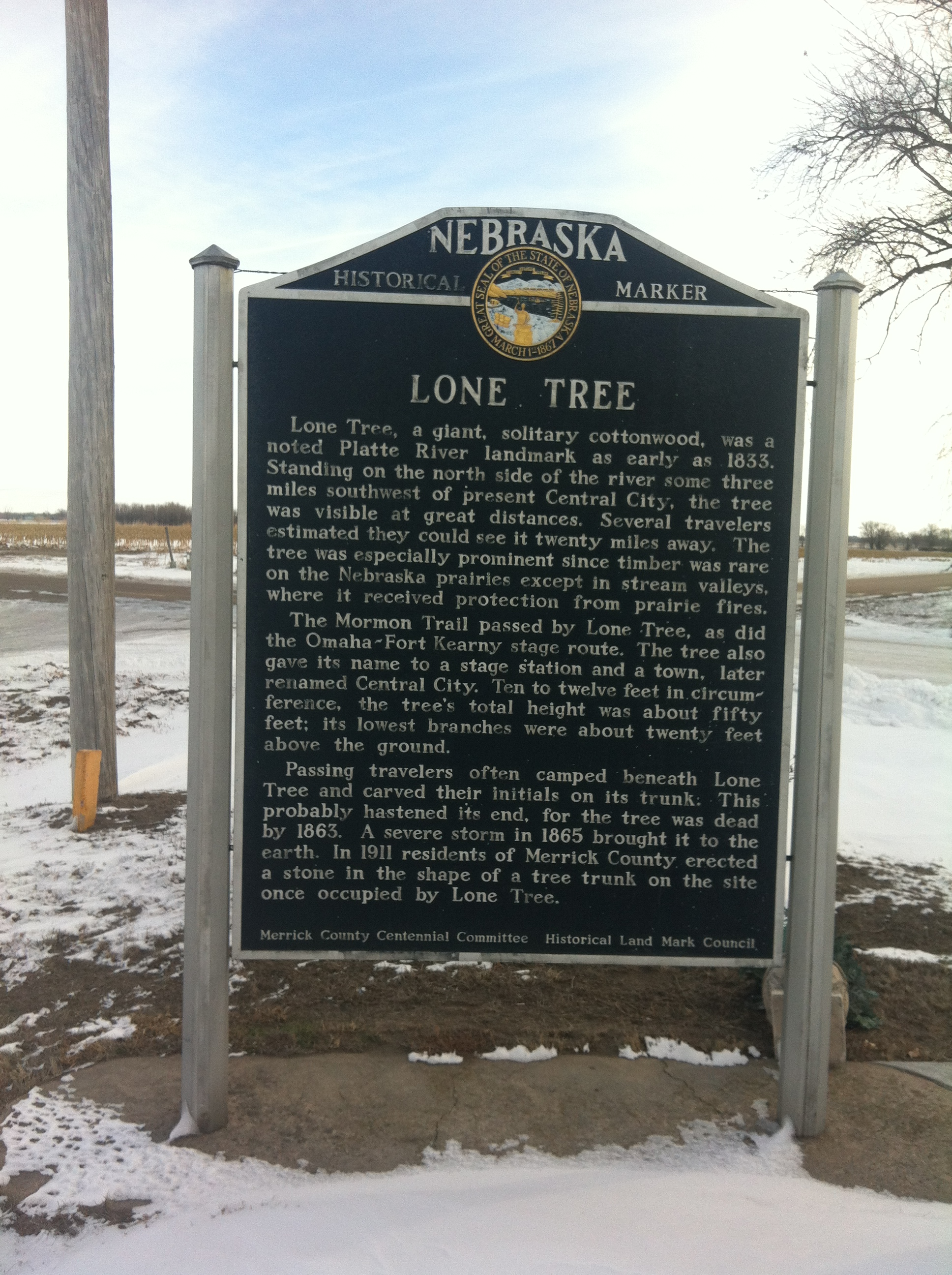
Lone Tree Landmark: Nebraska State Historical Society, Marker 92

In 1865, a great storm blew the tree over. The tree had died in 1863 and this was thought the consequence of two factors. First, as pioneers passed along the Overland Trail and Mormon Trail, they made carvings in its bark, thereby gradually destroying it. Second, pioneers often built campfires at the base of the tree, which may have further weakened it. Part of its trunk was taken to Lone Tree station (which later became Central City) and placed on the depot platform. Over time, fragments of it were carried away by tourists until it disappeared.

=== Lone Tree (Central City) ===
In 1866, the mythical Merrick county seat of Elvira was given an actual location in a town called "Lone Tree," which, in 1875, would be renamed "Central City."

=== 1911 monument ===
Although the original Lone Tree had long disappeared, the people of Merrick county had not forgotten its historical significance. In 1911, they erected a granite monument. Thirty years later, another cottonwood tree was planted at the original tree's location next to the granite monument. In 1911, there were also two dedications of the monument, one on August 9, 1911 and a second rededication of it on July 3, 2011.
