= Wright Morris =

American photographer and novelist

- Born: January 6, 1910; Central City, Nebraska, U.S.
- Died: April 25, 1998 (aged 88); Mill Valley, California, U.S.
- Education: Pacific Union College; Pomona College (BA)
- Occupations: Writer, photographer
- Notable work: The Field of Vision; Plains Song: For Female Voices
- Spouses: Mary Finfrock (m. 1934; div. 1959): Josephine Mary Kantor
- Awards: National Book Award, 1956; American Book Award, 1981

Wright Marion Morris (January 6, 1910 – April 25, 1998) was an American novelist, photographer, and essayist. He is known for his portrayals of the people and artifacts of the Great Plains in words and pictures, as well as for experimenting with narrative forms.

== Early life ==
Morris was born in Central City, Nebraska; his boyhood home is on the National Register of Historic Places. His mother, Grace Osborn Morris, died six days after he was born. His father, William Henry Morris, worked for the Union Pacific Railroad. After Grace's death, Wright was cared for by a nanny, until his father made a trip to Omaha and returned with a young wife, Gertrude. In Will's Boy, Morris states, "Gertrude was closer to my age than to my father's". Gertrude hated small-town life, but got along famously with Wright, as they shared many of the same childish tastes (both loved games, movies, and ice cream). In 1919, the family moved to Omaha, where they resided until 1924.

During that interlude, Morris spent two summers on his uncle's farm near Norfolk, Nebraska. Photographs of the farm, as well as the real-life characters of Uncle Harry and Aunt Clara, appear in Morris's books.

== Career ==
Morris moved to Chicago in 1924. Later that year, he accompanied his father on a road trip to the west coast that formed the basis for his first novel, My Uncle Dudley. He also lived briefly with his uncle in Texas before enrolling in Pacific Union College in California. He graduated from Pomona College in 1933. He married Mary Ellen Finfrock in 1934; the couple divorced in 1959. He later married Josephine Mary Kantor.

Following college, Morris traveled through Europe on a "wanderjahr," which he later fictionalized in Cause for Wonder.

From 1944 to 1954, Morris lived in Philadelphia. From 1954 to 1962, he divided his time between California and Mexico. In 1963, he accepted a teaching position at San Francisco State College. He retired from teaching in 1975.

Morris won the National Book Award for The Field of Vision in 1956. In 1981, he won the award a second time for his final novel, Plains Song.

Morris developed close friendships with several other American authors, most notably John O'Hara and Thornton Wilder, and was a pall bearer at O'Hara's funeral in 1970. He also conducted a weekly correspondence with Scottish author Muriel Spark from 1962 until his death.

Morris died of esophageal cancer in Mill Valley, California in 1998. He is buried in the Chapman Cemetery.

== Bibliography ==
=== Novels ===
- My Uncle Dudley (Harcourt, 1942)
- The Man Who Was There (Scribner, 1945)
- The World in the Attic (Scribner, 1949)
- Man and Boy (Knopf, 1951)
- The Works of Love (Knopf, 1952)
- The Deep Sleep (Scribner, 1953)
- The Huge Season (Viking, 1954)
- The Field of Vision (Harcourt, 1956)
- Love Among the Cannibals (Harcourt, 1957)
- Ceremony in Lone Tree (Atheneum, 1960)
- What a Way to Go (Atheneum, 1962)
- Cause for Wonder (Atheneum, 1963)
- One Day (Atheneum, 1965)
- In Orbit (New American Library, 1967)
- Fire Sermon (Harper & Row, 1971)
- War Games (Black Sparrow, 1972)
- A Life (Harper & Row, 1973)
- The Fork River Space Project (Harper & Row, 1977)
- Plains Song (Harper & Row, 1980)
- "The Loneliness of the Long Distance Writer" (Black Sparrow,1995)

=== Short stories ===
- Green Grass, Blue Sky, White House (1970)
- Here Is Einbaum (1973)
- Real Losses, Imaginary Gains (1976)
- Collected Stories 1948-1986 (1986)

=== Memoirs ===
- Will's Boy (1981)
- Solo (1983)
- A Cloak of Light (1985)

=== Essays ===
- The Territory Ahead (1958)
- A Bill of Rites, a Bill of Wrongs, a Bill of Goods (1968)
- About Fiction (1975)
- Earthly Delights, Unearthly Adornments (1978)

=== "Phototext" ===
- The Inhabitants (1946)
- The Home Place (1948)
- God’s Country and My People (1968)
- Love Affair: A Venetian Journal (1972)
- Photographs and Words (1982)

=== Anthology ===
- Wright Morris: A Reader (1970)

== Awards and honors ==
Morris received numerous honors in addition to the National Book Awards for The Field of Vision and Plains Song. (Note: Plains Song won the 1981 award for hardcover Fiction. From 1980 to 1983 in National Book Awards history there were dual hardcover and paperback awards in most categories. Most of the paperback award-winners were reprints, including the 1981 Fiction.) He was granted Guggenheim Fellowships in 1942, 1946, and 1954. In 1975, he won the Mari Sandoz Award recognizing "significant, enduring contribution to the Nebraska book world". In 1979, he received the Western Literature Association's Distinguished Achievement Award. In 1981, he won the Los Angeles Times' Book Prize Robert Kirsch Award for lifetime achievement. In 1982, a jury of Modern Language Association members selected him for the Common Wealth Award for distinguished service in literature. In 1985, he was one of the inaugural recipients of the Whiting Award. In 1986, he was honored with a Creative Writing Fellowship from the National Endowment for the Arts.

== Archives ==
The full archive of Wright Morris photographs is located at the Center for Creative Photography (CCP) at the University of Arizona in Tucson, which also manages the copyright of these photographs.

The Lincoln City Libraries of Lincoln, NE, houses some Morris correspondence and taped interviews in The Gale E. Christianson Collection of Eiseley Research Materials and The Wright Morris-Victor Musselman Correspondence collection.

The University of Nebraska–Lincoln Libraries houses a collection of Wright Morris papers, including material donated by Josephine Morris (1927–2002), widow of Wright Morris.

== Historical places in the life of Wright Morris ==
Wright Morris wrote about the places and lives he knew. Here are a few of the most historic.

- Cahow Barber Shop
- Patterson Law Office
- Wright Morris Boyhood House
