= Cahow Barber Shop =

- U.S. National Register of Historic Places
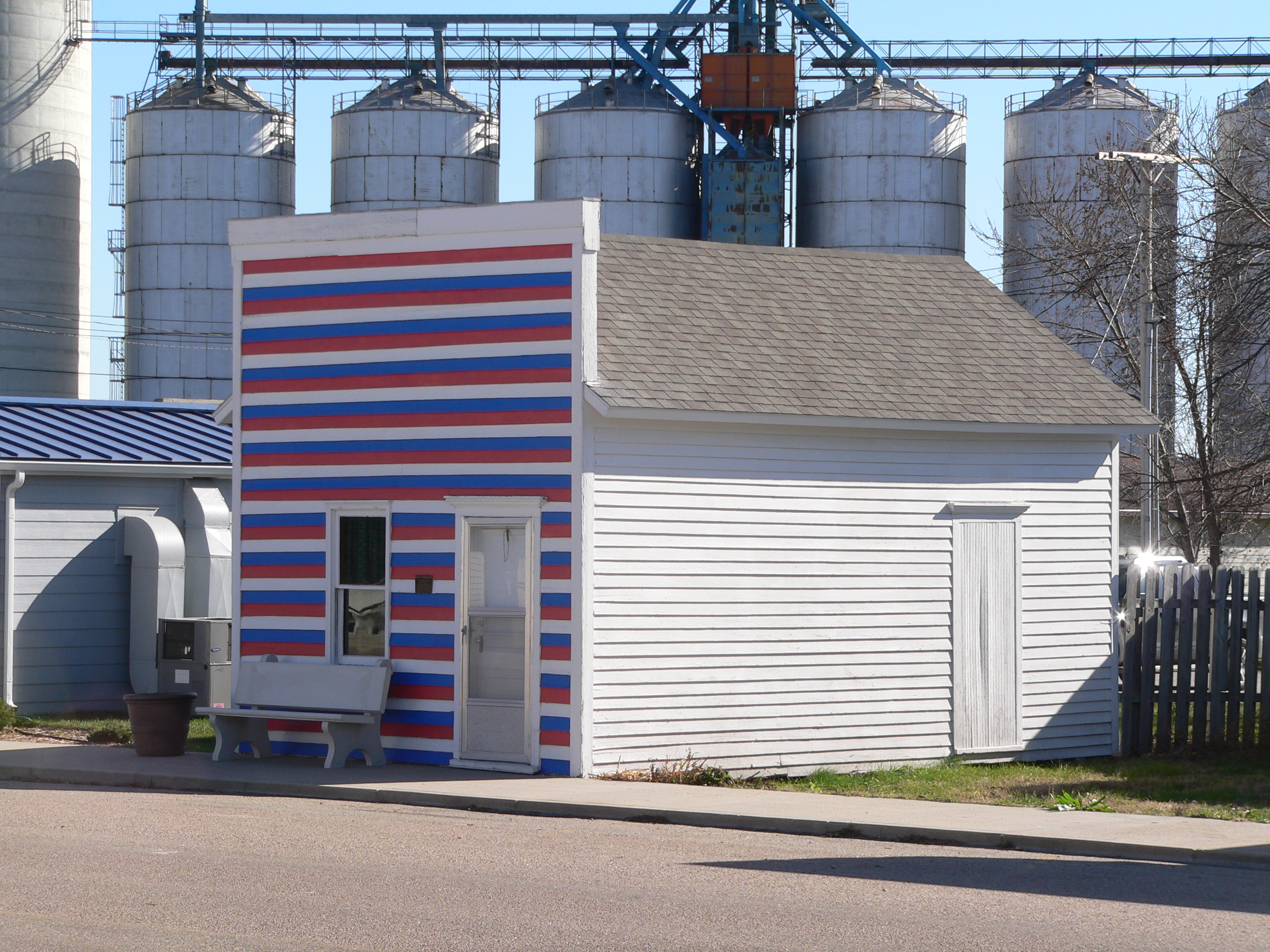
- View from the northwest; photographed in 2009 after renovation.

- Location within Nebraska Location within the United States
- Location: SW Main St, Chapman, Nebraska
- Coordinates: 41°01′27″N 98°09′31″W
- Built: 1889
- Architect: NA
- Architectural style: False-Front Building
- NRHP reference No.: 84002493
- Added to NRHP: January 12, 1984

The Cahow Barber Shop is located in Chapman, Nebraska. It is a false-front building of frame construction with a gable roof and linteled door and window hoods, built in 1889. It is listed in the National Register of Historic Places; its historical significance derives from its age, its architectural design, and its association with author-photographer Wright Morris.

== History and description ==
The barber shop was built in 1889, but little else is known about its history until Luther Cahow (born in Stuart, Iowa) purchased the barber shop in 1902. He barbered in it for 47 years and sold it in 1949.

It is rectangular, one-story, wood-frame structure with a false-front and gable roof. It has been restored by the Lone Tree Literary Society, preserving the original structure including the foundation of limestone runners and the original clapboard siding. It was constructed from May to December in 1889 and still stands on its original site. It was altered from two rooms to one by removing the interior wall dividing the original two rooms. The front half of the interior had the original interior replaced with dry wall while the back half retained the original wainscot and plaster. The three windows and three doors are original. The original contents of the building (barber chair, mirror and backboard, clock, barber sink, and benches) are housed in the Merrick County Museum in Central City.

The Cahow Barber Shop is historically significant for several reasons. Perhaps the most important reason is its relationship to Wright Morris. It appears in his literary works and photographs, and is where his father (William Henry Morris) first met his mother (Grace Osborn). Architecturally it is significant, because it is one of the only remaining 19th century false-front buildings in Merrick County.

== See also ==
- Patterson Law Office
- Wright Morris Boyhood House
