= Nelson Farm, Nebraska =

- Nelson Farm
- U.S. National Register of Historic Places
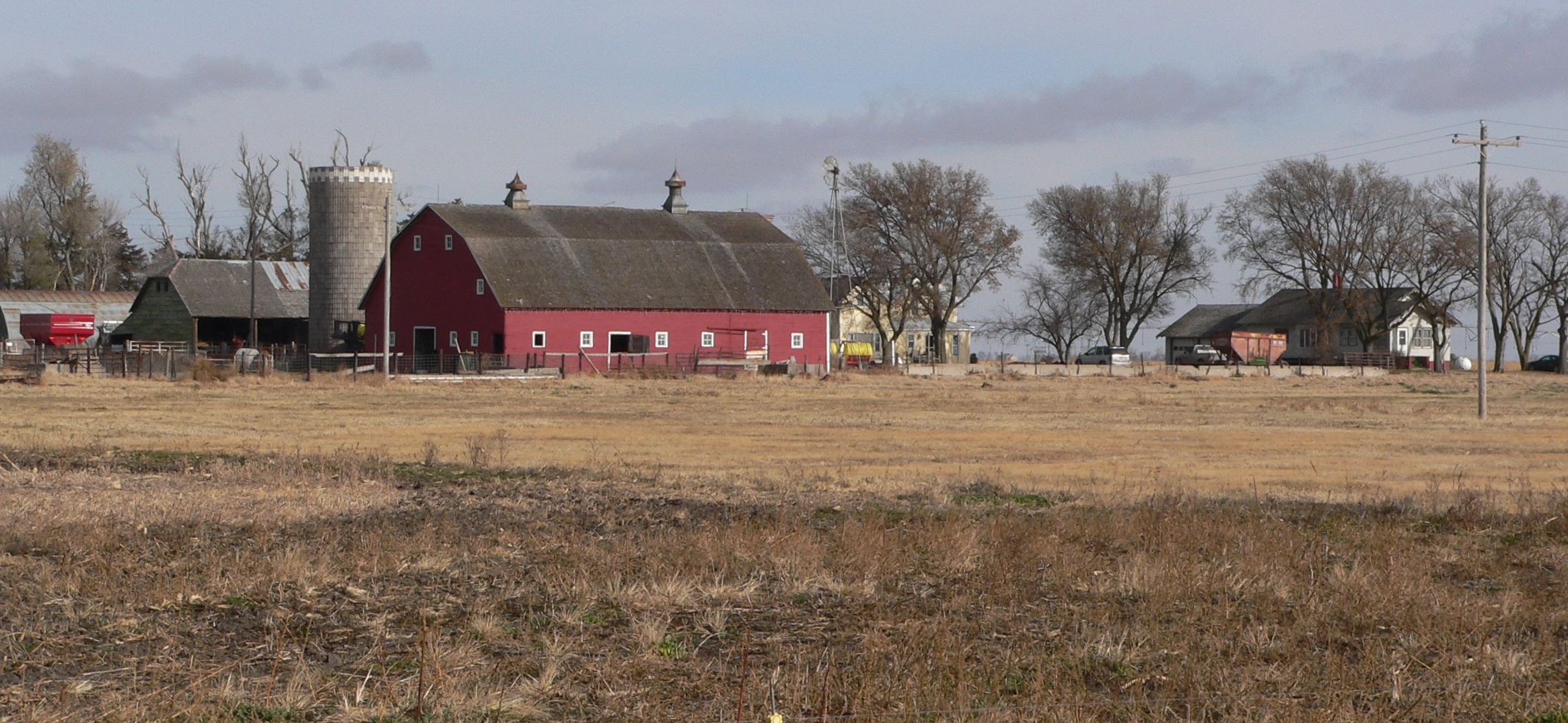
- Viewed from the southwest.

- Location within Nebraska
- Location: 1139 M Rd in Merrick County, Nebraska, west of Central City
- Coordinates: 41°6′22.0″N 98°5′27.0″W
- Built: 1887 to 1950s
- Architect: John M. Nelson and Herman Nelson
- NRHP reference No.: 09000650
- Added to NRHP: August 26, 2009

The Nelson Farm is a historic farmstead in rural Merrick County, in the east central part of the state of Nebraska in the Midwestern United States. Originally settled by Swedish immigrants in 1879, it was expanded and improved over the subsequent eighty years and more, remaining in the founder's family into the fourth and fifth generations.

The farm is listed in the National Register of Historic Places, as providing a physical record of the style of houses and buildings on farmsteads in Merrick County from the late 1880s to the 1950s, and as illustrating how building styles, uses of buildings, and uses of land changed with the introduction of new technology.

== History ==
In 1858, the Nebraska Territorial Legislature established Merrick County and Lone Tree (renamed Central City in 1866). Most of the early settlers in the county were from Ireland, Germany, Sweden, Denmark, Poland, Wales, and Scotland. In the early 1870s, more settlers were moving into Merrick County, but a "vast swarm of grasshoppers" devastated the crops in 1874.

In 1879, Swedish immigrant John Magnus Nelson moved to Merrick County in 1879 with his wife Ina Peterson, after arriving in the United States at the age of 22 and then living for six years in Illinois. Nelson claimed a parcel of 160 acres (65 ha) west of Central City under the Homestead Act. He built a sod house, where he and his family lived for seven years.

In 1887, Nelson built a two-story frame house; in 1916, he added a barn. In laying out the farmstead, it is thought that he was guided a variety of sources: Swedish periodicals, guidebooks such as The Farmer's Almanac, Swedish ethnic tradition, the advice of his neighbors in Merrick County, and his own experience as a farmer in Illinois and in Nebraska. As his son Herman Nelson began to play a larger role in the management of the farm, elements of "scientific farming" or "progressive farming", based on newer guidebooks, were incorporated into the arrangement of the farmstead. By 1921, the farm had expanded to encompass 480 acres (190 ha).

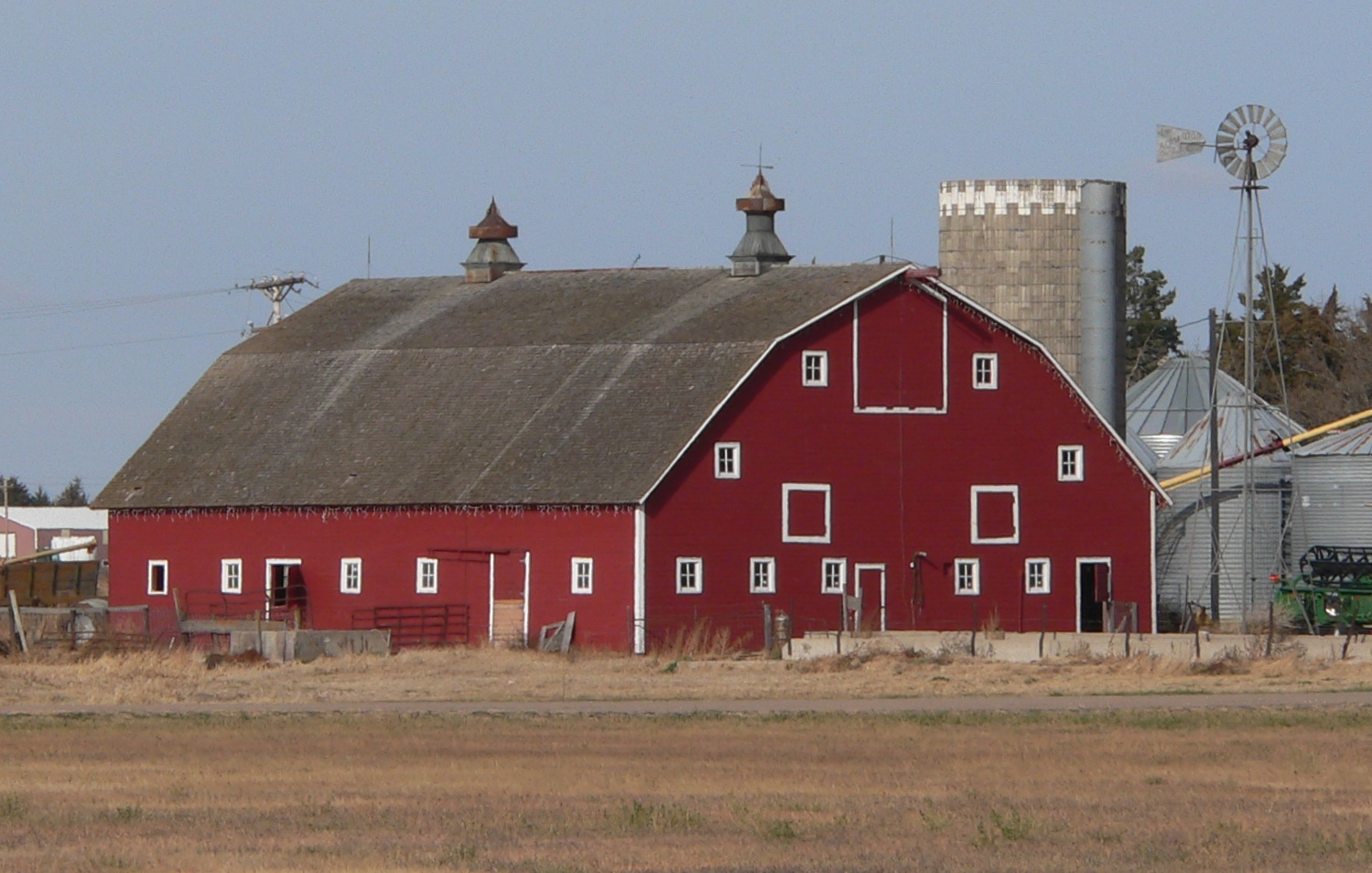
Barn, silo, and windmill on the farm.

The Great Depression was a difficult time on the Nelson Farm, and the expansion of the farm may have added to the difficulties. During this period, improvements to the farmstead were limited. By 1935, Herman Nelson had concluded that some means of irrigating the crops was necessary. Since there was no ditch system to bring water from the Platte River, he installed a system of deep-well irrigation, making the Nelson farm one of the first in Merrick County to use this water source.

This period also marked the construction of the final house on the Nelson farmstead in 1935, built by Herman Nelson in anticipation of his son’s marriage in 1935. Other improvements to the farmstead followed. A cement silo was added in the 1940s. The original granary was converted into a machine shed. In the 1940s and 1950s, an Aerometer windmill was installed to water the livestock, and a metal shed was built. Few changes were made to the farm from 1959 until 2002, when it was changed over from deep-well to center-pivot irrigation.

As of 2009, the farm was occupied and operated by members of the fourth and fifth generations of John M. Nelson's family.

Through the farm's history, crops have been raised chiefly to feed livestock, with any surplus being sold on the market. In its early years, the chief crop was probably corn; later, alfalfa was added to the mix, both because of its use as animal feed and because it added nitrogen to the soil. Livestock kept on the farm included horses, necessary as draft animals until they were supplanted by machinery. Cattle and hogs have been raised for the market through most of the farm's history. In the early 1900s, the farm maintained a dairy herd of 40–50 Holsteins, and poultry were raised for meat and eggs by the farm's women.

== Description ==
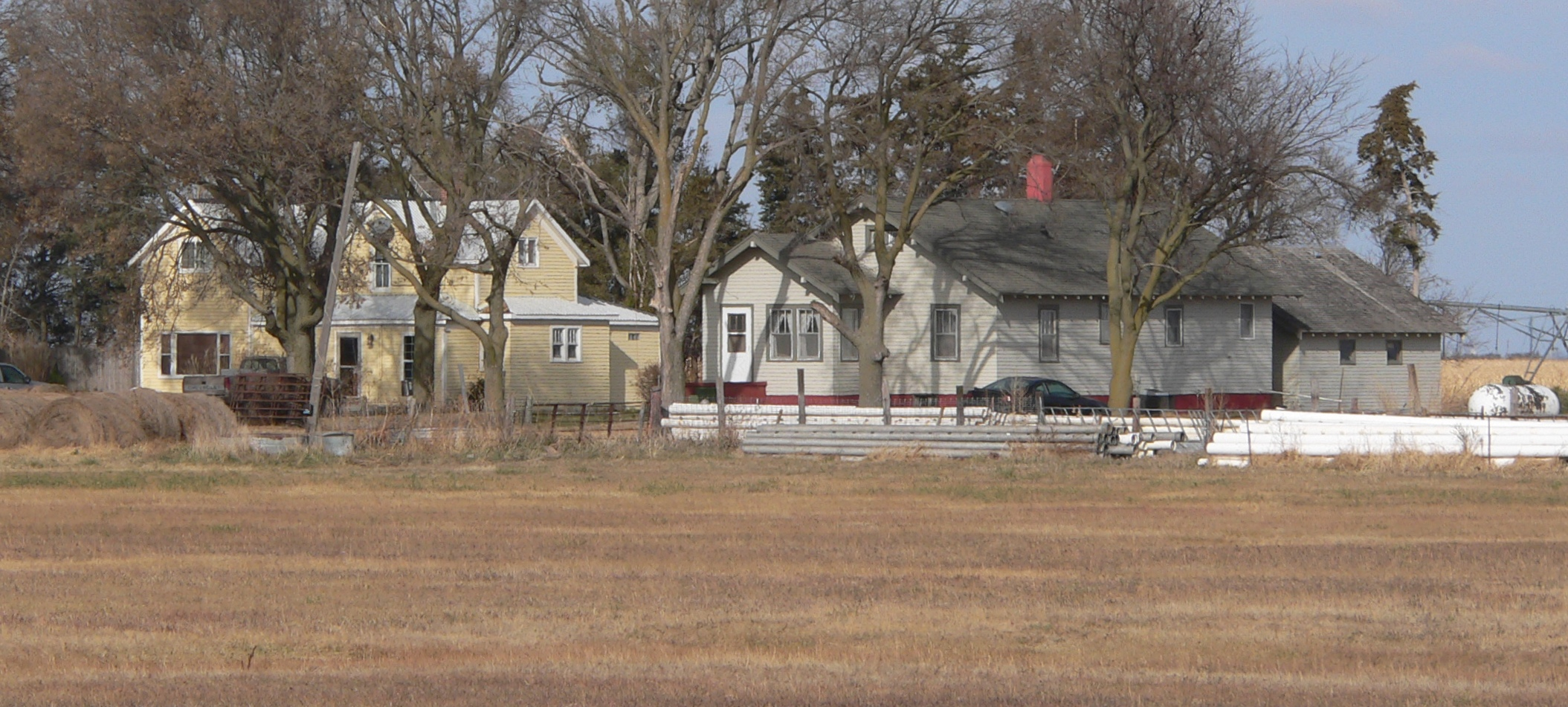
The two houses on the farm.

The Nelson Farm consists of the northern 80 acres (32 ha) of John M. Nelson’s original homestead and the farmstead is centered in the southern 40 acres (16 ha) of the farm. An unpaved road leads to the houses on the farmstead. The farmstead is a rectangular site measuring approximately six acres (2.4 ha). It is bounded on the north by a windbreak of trees; this once bounded the farm on the west side as well, but has largely been removed. The south and east sides are bordered by agricultural fields. The houses rest on eastern third of the farmstead. The other two-thirds of the farmstead consists of agricultural buildings for livestock, machine, and crop storage. This area includes the large barn, the machine shed (formerly the granary), a metal shed, concrete and metal silos, feed and water tanks, and a windmill. Agricultural fields used for the cultivation of row crops compose the rest of the Nelson Farm.

=== Buildings ===
- House (1887): Constructed by John M. Nelson, it is a variation on ell house architecture, commonly found on farms of this period in the Midwest. It is a two story clapboard house resting on a limestone block foundation. Decorative features are limited and always simple.
- Barn (1916): Constructed by Herman Nelson, the large frame barn is the most prominent structure on the Nelson Farm. It is 84×64×40 feet (26×20×12 m), which makes it one of the tallest structures in Merrick County. In 2007, 135 US gallons (510 L) of traditional red were used to repaint it. The barn contains a large hay loft above a main floor for livestock. The massive gambrel is the barn’s most impressive feature. Both ends of the barn are nearly symmetrical in arrangement of openings. Alterations to the barn have been minimal.
- House (1935): Constructed by Herman Nelson, it is a vernacular interpretation of the bungalow style house. It is a one-story house resting on a raised concrete foundation. It has gable roof with an overhanging eve supported by exposed beams, which is a hallmark of the bungalow style. The rear of the house has a two-car garage.
- Concrete Silo (1940s): It is nearly as tall as the barn and is used to store corn and other grains. It was built by stacking identical pre-cast interlocking concrete staves, creating a ringed appearance.
- Machine Shed (1940s): It was originally a granary but was converted into a machine shed. The original granary structure was probably built at the same time as the barn. To convert it to a machine shed, the elevator and south wall were removed. The alterations occurred during a period of historical significance, illustrating the transition from "horse power" to mechanization. This was made possible by using silos to store grain.
- Metal Shed (1950s): It is a pre-fabricated, corrugated metal building that is hallmark of a style of utility building developed by the military in World War II. It was added to provide additional storage for agricultural equipment. The company responsible for fabricating it is unknown.
- Windmill (1950s): It is a model 702 Aermotor Windmill used to pump water for the livestock. It is approximately 40 feet (12 m) in height, with a steel wheel approximately 8 feet (2.4 m) in diameter. It is no longer in use, but is in good condition.

=== Sites ===
- Windbreak (1880s): John M. Nelson planted it after he selected the site for his farmstead. It extends approximately 900 feet (270 m) east from the western edge of the farmstead. It is composed of mature deciduous coniferous trees.
- Agricultural Fields (1880s–1920s): They surround the farmstead on the north, south and east sides. The fields are used for cattle pasture and to grow row crops.

== Historical significance ==
In 2009, the farmstead was added to the National Register of Historic Places under the name "Nelson Farm". According to the nominating documents, it was historically significant for several reasons. It was typical of how farms in rural Merrick County were first established and subsequently developed from the homestead era through the 1950s. It represented an example of progressive agricultural practices in Merrick County during this time, and it illustrated how styles of building design and use changed with technological development. The windbreak, for example, was planted to shelter livestock rather than people, illustrating the early reliance on “horse power” for plowing and other farming activities. The 1916 barn was initially constructed to shelter horses, but its function changed later with the mechanization of the farm.

The Nelson Farm was also one of the largest in Merrick County’s Lone Tree Township during portions of its history: in 1921, the Nelson family farmed more acres than any other family in the Lone Tree Township.
