= Wright Morris Boyhood House =

Historic house in Nebraska, United States

- U.S. National Register of Historic Places
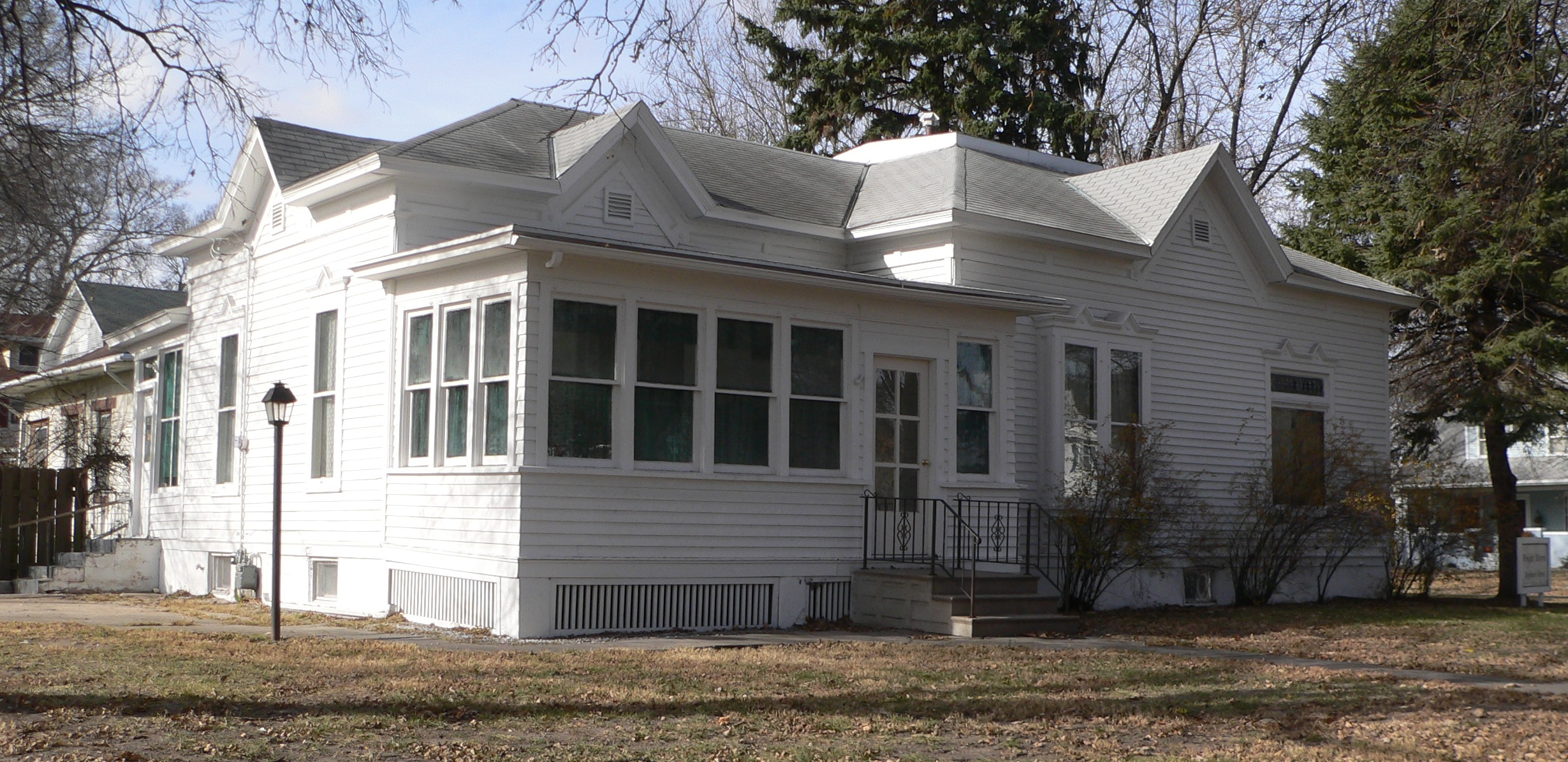
- Viewed from the southeast.

- Location within Nebraska Location within the United States
- Location: 304 D Street in Central City, Nebraska
- Coordinates: 41°7′2.0″N 98°1′38.0″W
- Built: 1893
- Architect: W. C. Kerr
- Architectural style: Vernacular
- NRHP reference No.: 80002457
- Added to NRHP: October 10, 1980

The Wright Morris Boyhood House is a vernacular-style house built in 1893 in Central City, Nebraska. It is listed in the National Register of Historic Places, as the boyhood home of author-photographer Wright Morris.

== History and description ==
The house was built in 1893 by W. C. Kerr, owner of Kerr Investment Company. It is a T-shaped, one-story vernacular frame house with two enclosed rear porches. It has three bays across the front with a centered doorway. It has a truncated hipped roof with a paneled cornice and gabled wall dormers centered on the front and rear of the house. The gabled pattern of the roof is repeated in the window and door trims. The interior includes pine woodwork, sliding doors, window seat, and a leaded glass transom window.

Its primary historical significance is its connection to Wright Morris, who was born in Central City, Nebraska on January 6, 1910, and lived in this house until 1919. The city and the house played a significant role in his literary works and photography. In a private letter he wrote: "The house in which I spent my childhood, and remains the center of all my boyhood impressions, is on the southwest corner of B and D, across from the Baptist Church. I confess I feel a great attachment for it."

== See also ==
- Cahow Barber Shop
- Patterson Law Office
