= Riverside Park Dance Pavilion =

- U.S. National Register of Historic Places
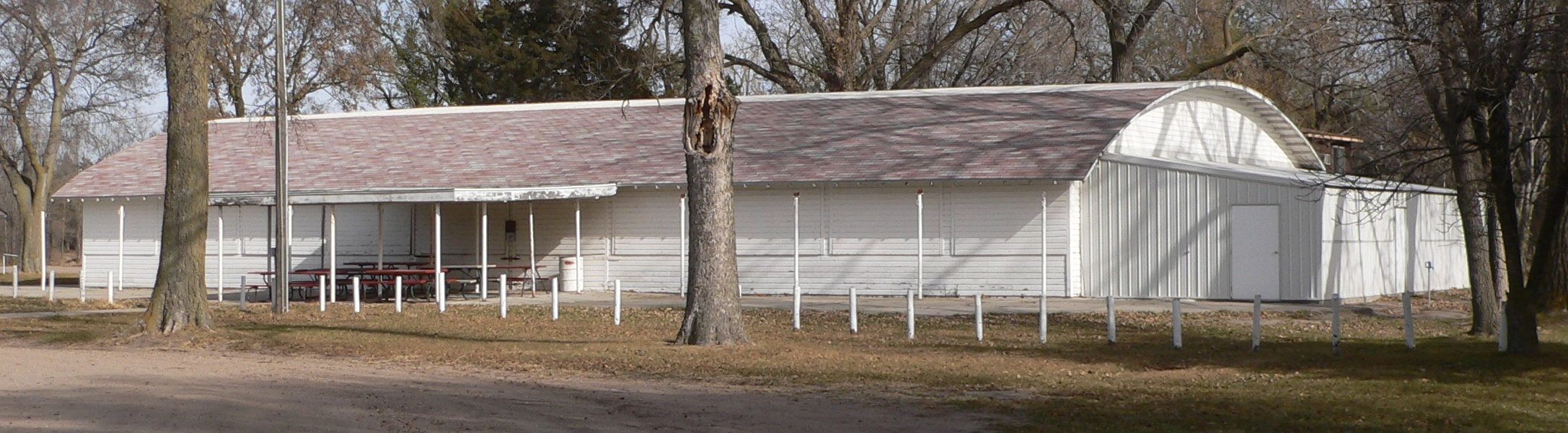
- Viewed from the southwest.

- Location within Nebraska
- Location: 1730 Riverside Road in Merrick County, Nebraska, southeast of Central City
- Coordinates: 41°5′50.0″N 97°58′11.0″W
- Area: less than one acre
- Built: 1940
- Architect: C. H. Good
- NRHP reference No.: 98001564
- Added to NRHP: December 31, 1998

The Riverside Park Dance Pavilion is in Merrick County, Nebraska. It was built in 1940 with the aim of reviving the Riverside Park area. At its peak, dances were held twice a week drawing people from central Nebraska. Its simple design (altered little since its construction) was characteristic of dance halls of its time, but which rarely still exist today. It is listed in the National Register of Historic Places.

== History ==
In the early 1900s, Central City underwent a building and business boom. In the fall of 1920, business leaders from Central City purchased over 50 acres (20 ha) of land, known as Parker's Island, from the estate of George Howell. They formed a non-profit corporation, the Riverside Park Association. Its purpose was to improve and operate the park for the entertainment of the general public. The Association sold shares of stock, summer cabins, and rented owners' cabins during the summer, with profits reinvested in the park.

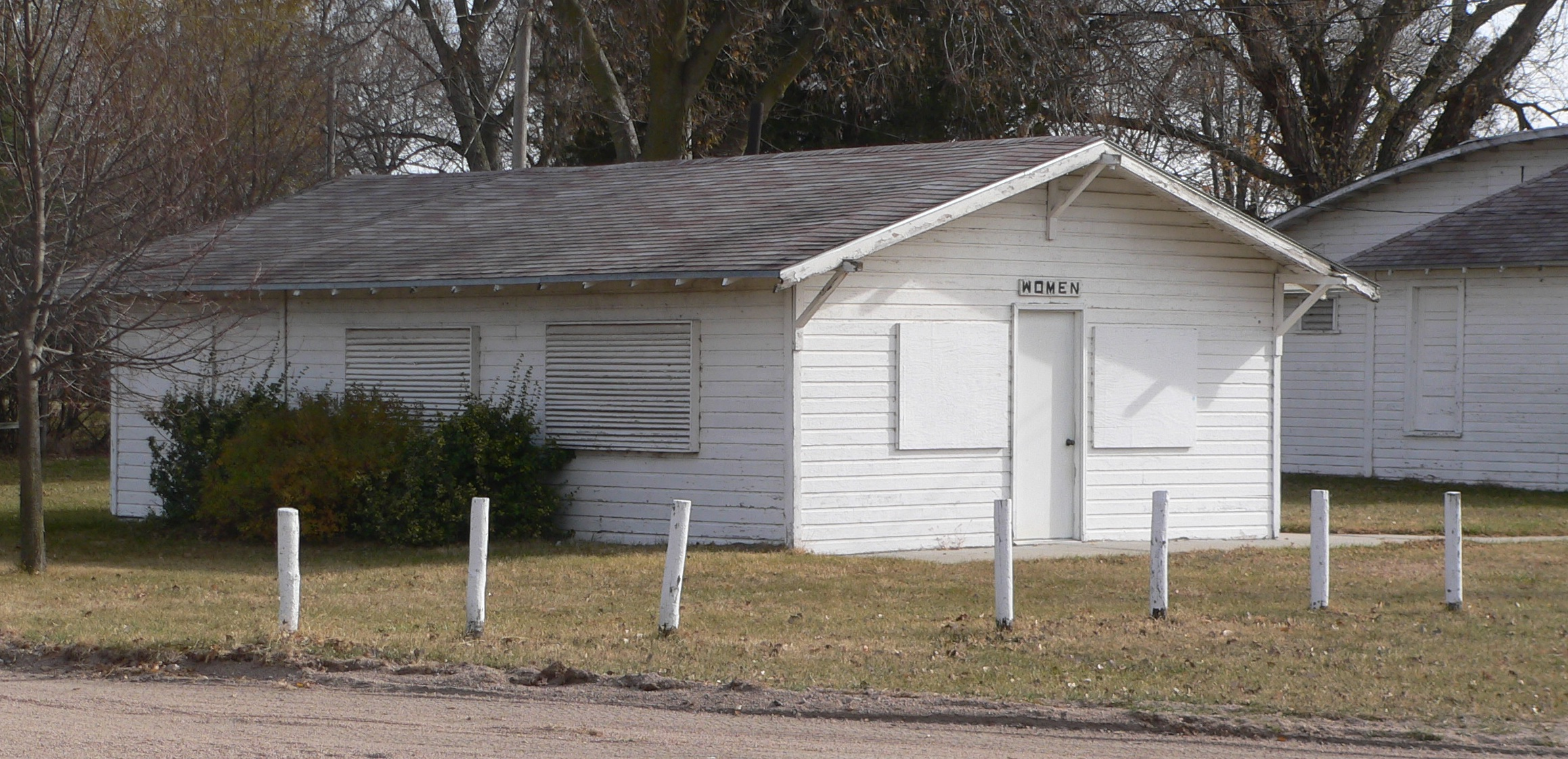
Restroom and concession building, seen from the west

The park included an open-air dance floor consisting of a concrete slab enclosed by a fence, tennis courts, a swimming pool with water slides, playground equipment, softball and baseball diamonds, horseshoe pitching courts and a picnic area. Its first dance was held in October 1921. In the 1920s, there were few recreation areas and few cars to travel to them, so the park was very popular.

The Great Depression resulted in decreased park revenues. Records from 1934 to 1938 show uncollected debts and unpaid bills due to a large drop in park visitation and summer cabin rentals from 1930 to 1940.

In 1940, the park was close to closing and a number of meetings were held by the association to decide its fate. On February 13, a new board of directors was elected and charged with finding a way to finance the park. On February 15, the board voted to finance the park by constructing an enclosed dance pavilion.

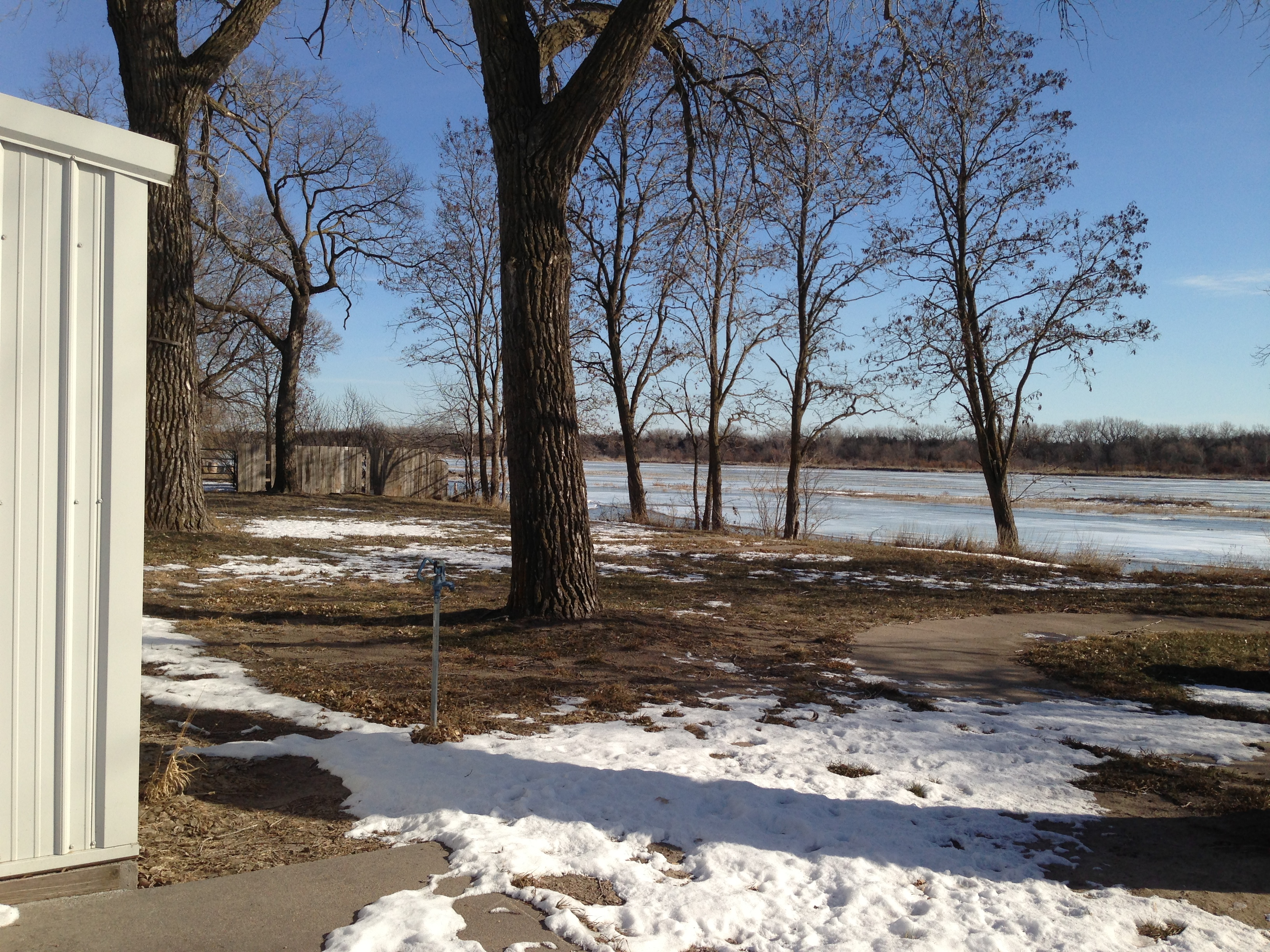
Platte river bounding the south side of Riverside Park Dance Pavilion (the southwest corner of the Pavilion can be seen on the left side of the photo)

On June 14, 1940, the pavilion opened, with 370 couples from five Nebraska counties and seven states purchasing tickets to dance to Sternie Sternberg and his Orchestra. On July 4 of that year, over 5,000 people attended the park and over 700 couples purchased dance tickets at ten cents apiece. Through the 1940s, dances were held about twice a week, with orchestras conducted by Wally Wallace, Earl Gardner, Skippy Anderson, Gene Pieper, Sammy Haven, Riley Smith, and with bands led by Tiny Little, Hutch Miller and John Holub.

== Description ==
The dance pavilion is located in Riverside Park in Merrick County, Nebraska, approximately 3 miles (4.8 km) southeast of Central City. It is in a pastoral area with trees next to the Platte River. Just to its north is a smaller restroom/concession building, built at or about the same time as the pavilion. The complex is bounded on the south by the Platte River, on the east by trees and shrubbery, and on the north and west by a gravel road.

The pavilion is a one-story wood-frame building with a footprint of 118 by 61 feet (36 m × 19 m). It has an arched roof with a 12-by-21-foot (3.7 m × 6.4 m) bay on the north side to accommodate bands and orchestras. The interior of the pavilion is open with a 95-by-54-foot (29 m × 16 m) maple wood dance floor. An open 18-by-56-foot (5.5 m × 17.1 m) seating and eating area is located on the south and separated from the main pavilion by a partial wall. On the north end is a 20-by-14-foot (6.1 m × 4.3 m) curved enclosure in which bands and orchestras perform.

== Historic significance ==
In 1998, the pavilion was listed in the National Register of Historic Places. Reasons given for its listing included its significance as an entertainment venue in the 1940s, and its being a well-preserved example of a dance hall of its period.
