= Patterson Law Office =

- U.S. National Register of Historic Places
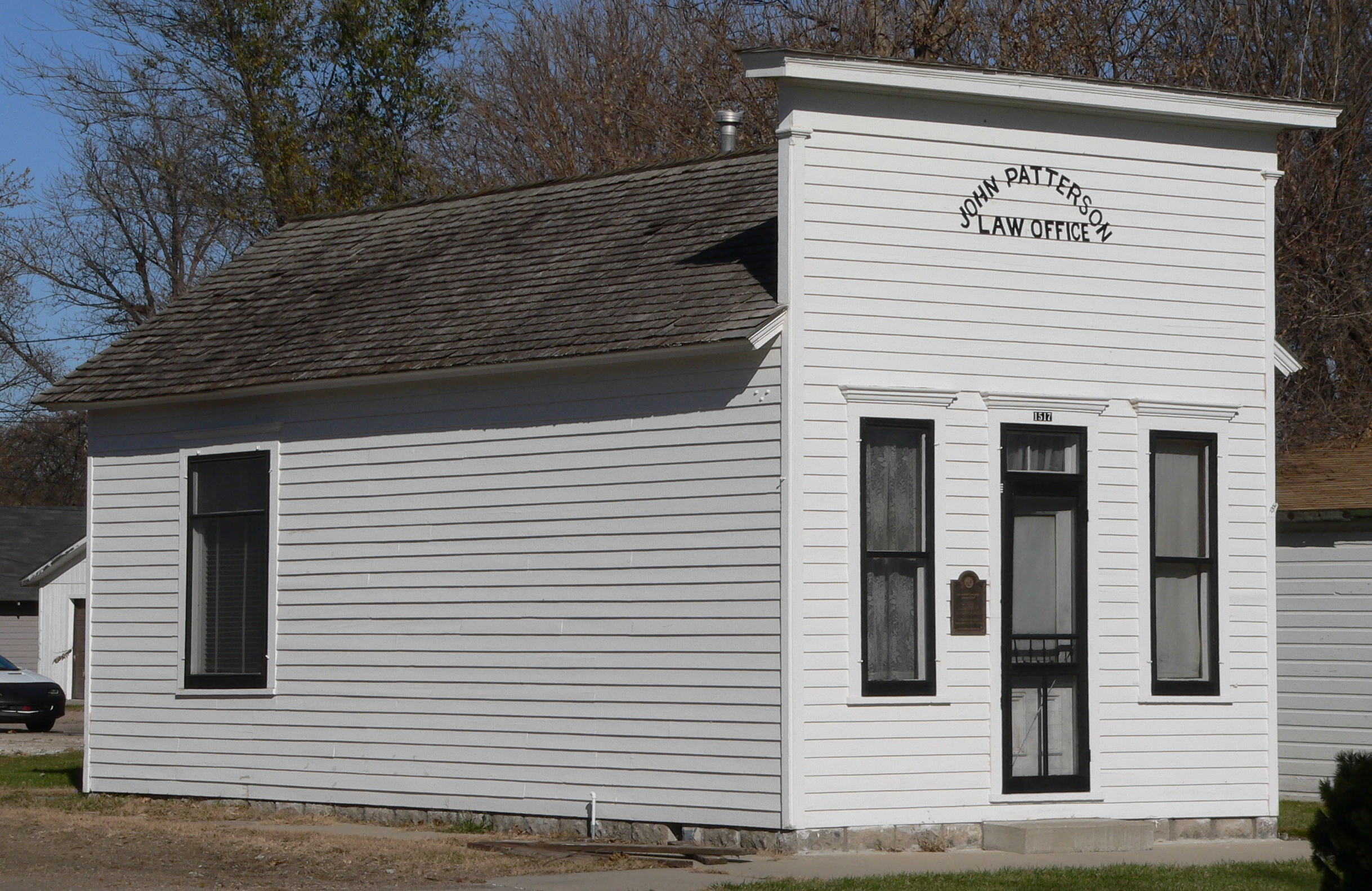
- View from the southwest.

- Location within Nebraska Location within the United States
- Location: 1517 18th St Central City, Nebraska
- Coordinates: 41°6′51″N 97°59′57″W
- Built: 1872
- Architect: NA
- Architectural style: False-Front Building, Vernacular Greek Revival
- NRHP reference No.: 79001451
- Added to NRHP: March 13, 1979

The Patterson Law Office is located in Central City, Nebraska. It is a false-front building of frame construction built in 1872. It is listed in the National Register of Historic Places; its historical significance derives from its age, its architectural design, and its association with John Patterson and with author-photographer Wright Morris.

== History and description ==
The Patterson Law Office was built in the same year as John Patterson, a native of Ireland, came to Lone Tree (now Central City), Nebraska. Patterson built a law practice in Merrick County housed in this building. He was a well-known trial lawyer and county attorney, played an important role in the development of Central City and Merrick County, and served as county superintendent of schools.

The law office is a one-story, false-fronted building with gable roof. It rests on a stone foundation and exhibits Greek Revival elements in the door, window, pilaster and cornice detailing. It has two rooms lined with wainscot paneling.

The building is historically significant for several reasons. It is one of the earliest known false-frame commercial buildings in Nebraska predating the majority of 19th century commercial buildings in Nebraska by nearly 20 years. It is associated with a significant figure, John Patterson, in the development of Central City and Merrick County. It also has relationships to Wright Morris appearing in his literary works.

== See also ==
- Cahow Barber Shop
- Wright Morris Boyhood House
