= Wolbach, Nebraska =

Village in Greeley County, Nebraska, United States

- Village
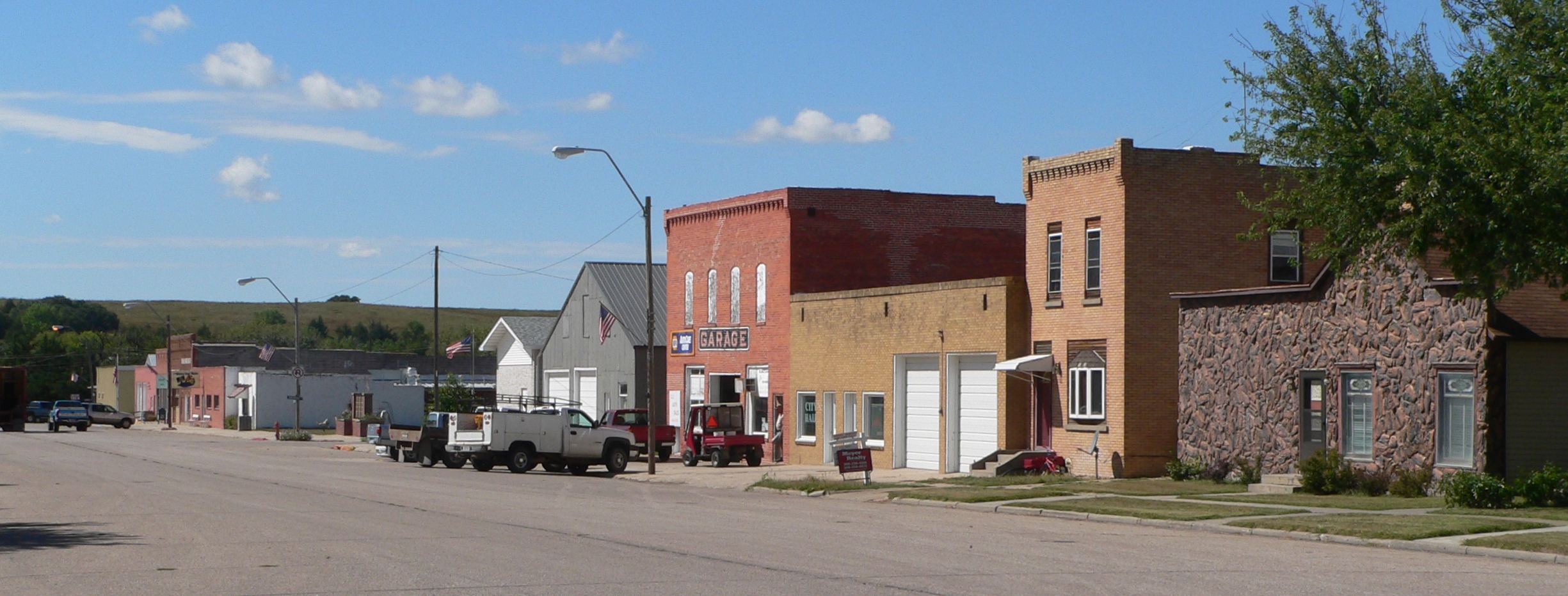
- Downtown Wolbach: Center Street

- Location of Wolbach, Nebraska
- Coordinates: 41°24′05″N 98°23′39″W
- Country: United States
- State: Nebraska
- County: Greeley

Area
  - Total: 0.70 sq mi (1.81 km^{2})
  - Land: 0.69 sq mi (1.78 km^{2})
  - Water: 0.012 sq mi (0.03 km^{2})
- Elevation: 1,854 ft (565 m)

Population (2020)
  - Total: 224
  - Density: 326.5/sq mi (126.07/km^{2})
- Time zone: UTC-6 (Central (CST))
  - Summer (DST): UTC-5 (CDT)
- ZIP code: 68882
- Area code: 308
- FIPS code: 31-53520
- GNIS feature ID: 2399726

Wolbach is a village in Greeley county, Nebraska, United States. (While the community of Wolbach extends south into Howard County, the village limits do not.) As of the 2020 census, Wolbach had a population of 224.

== History ==
Wolbach was established as a town in 1887 when the railroad was extended to that point. It was named for S. N. Wolbach, one of the original owners of the town site.

== Geography ==
According to the United States Census Bureau, the village has a total area of 0.70 square miles (1.81 km^{2}), of which 0.69 square miles (1.79 km^{2}) is land and 0.01 square miles (0.03 km^{2}) is water.

== Demographics ==
Historical population
| Census | Pop. | Note | %± |
|---|---|---|---|
| 1910 | 563 | | — |
| 1920 | 589 | | 4.6% |
| 1930 | 501 | | −14.9% |
| 1940 | 523 | | 4.4% |
| 1950 | 442 | | −15.5% |
| 1960 | 382 | | −13.6% |
| 1970 | 366 | | −4.2% |
| 1980 | 301 | | −17.8% |
| 1990 | 280 | | −7.0% |
| 2000 | 287 | | 2.5% |
| 2010 | 283 | | −1.4% |
| 2020 | 224 | | −20.8% |
U.S. Decennial Census

=== 2010 census ===
At the 2010 census there were 283 people, 128 households, and 76 families in the village. The population density was 410.1 inhabitants per square mile (158.3/km^{2}). There were 159 housing units at an average density of 230.4 per square mile (89.0/km^{2}). The racial makeup of the village was 97.2% White, 1.1% African American, 0.4% Asian, and 1.4% from two or more races. Hispanic or Latino of any race were 1.1%.

Of the 128 households 26.6% had children under the age of 18 living with them, 51.6% were married couples living together, 5.5% had a female householder with no husband present, 2.3% had a male householder with no wife present, and 40.6% were non-families. 37.5% of households were one person and 20.3% were one person aged 65 or older. The average household size was 2.21 and the average family size was 2.93.

The median age in the village was 45.5 years. 24.4% of residents were under the age of 18; 6.7% were between the ages of 18 and 24; 18.4% were from 25 to 44; 29.3% were from 45 to 64; and 21.2% were 65 or older. The gender makeup of the village was 48.8% male and 51.2% female.

=== 2000 census ===
At the 2000 census there were 287 people, 128 households, and 77 families in the village. The population density was 421.4 inhabitants per square mile (162.7/km^{2}). There were 140 housing units at an average density of 205.5 per square mile (79.3/km^{2}). The racial makeup of the village was 96.86% White, 2.09% from other races, and 1.05% from two or more races. Hispanic or Latino of any race were 2.09%.

Of the 128 households 30.5% had children under the age of 18 living with them, 49.2% were married couples living together, 10.2% had a female householder with no husband present, and 39.1% were non-families. 37.5% of households were one person and 21.9% were one person aged 65 or older. The average household size was 2.24 and the average family size was 3.00.

The age distribution was 25.4% under the age of 18, 7.0% from 18 to 24, 27.2% from 25 to 44, 17.8% from 45 to 64, and 22.6% 65 or older. The median age was 39 years. For every 100 females, there were 87.6 males. For every 100 females age 18 and over, there were 82.9 males.

The median household income was $25,536, and the median family income was $37,750. Males had a median income of $26,667 versus $16,875 for females. The per capita income for the village was $13,472. About 10.1% of families and 14.7% of the population were below the poverty line, including 23.2% of those under the age of eighteen and 15.6% of those sixty five or over.

== See also ==
- List of municipalities in Nebraska
