= Heber Hord House =

- U.S. National Register of Historic Places
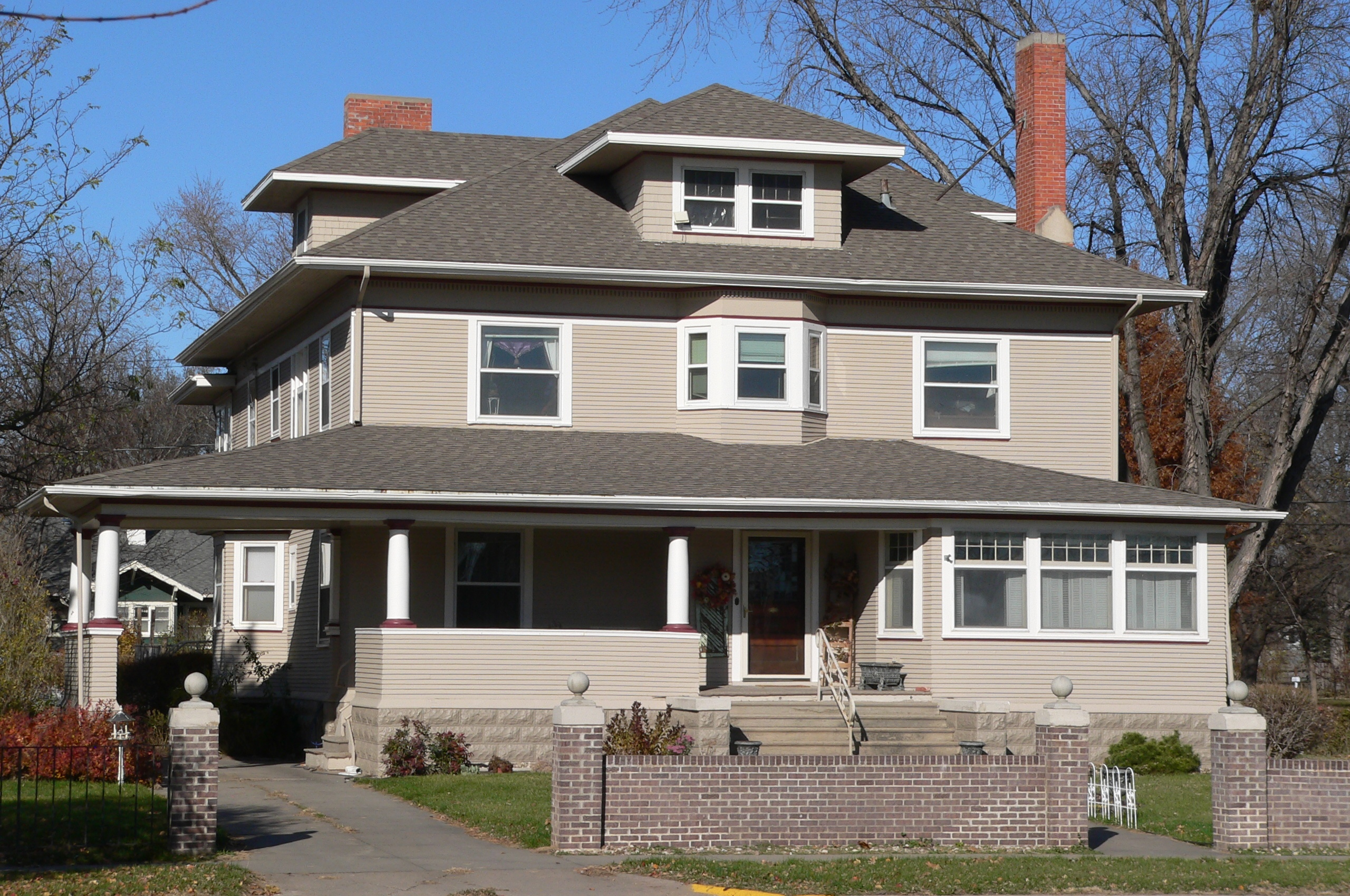
- Viewed from the south

- Location within Nebraska
- Interactive map showing the location of Heber Hord House
- Location: 1505 16th St, Central City, Nebraska
- Coordinates: 41.116420354917516°N 97.99928092124345°W
- Built: 1906
- Architect: Fisher & Lawrie
- Architectural style: Classic Box
- NRHP reference No.: 87002096
- Added to NRHP: December 7, 1987

The Heber Hord House is a two-story frame house in Central City, Nebraska. It was designed by Omaha architects Fisher & Lawrie, and built in 1906 by Heber Hord, the only son of Thomas Benton (T. B.) Hord, a prominent business man and cattle rancher in Nebraska during the late 19th and early 20th centuries. It is listed in the National Register of Historic Places.

== Hord family ==
T. B. Hord moved with his family from Cheyenne, Wyoming to Central City in the late 1880s. There, he established the Hord Land and Cattle Company, the Hord and Shonsey Cattle Company, the T. B. Hord Alfalfa Meal Company, the 70,000-acre (28,000 ha) Lakeside Ranch, a number of lumber yards and feed and farm supply businesses in central Nebraska, and fifty grain elevators. At the height of his business career, his Central City livestock-feeding operations and grain company were judged by many to be the largest such operations in Nebraska. For example, in 1908, his livestock feeding company could feed 16,000 cattle and 12,000 hogs, making it possibly the largest such operation in the world at that time.

Heber Hord, the only son of T. B. Hord, was born in 1877. He lived on his father's ranches until 1906, when he and his family built and moved into this house in Central City.

In 1910, T. B. Hord died and Heber Hord took over the family businesses. He expanded the operations established by his father, at one point feeding up to 97,000 sheep; in 1917, he established a short-lived potash operation, the Hord Alkali Products Company, near Lakeside, Nebraska, after the outbreak of World War I made German potash unavailable. During the Great Depression, several of the family's businesses failed; but Hord was able to save three of its major operations: the Lakeside Ranch Company, the T. B. Hord Grain Company, and the feeding operation Hord and Son, Inc. For 25 years, he also served on the board of directors for Omaha's Union Stockyards.

Heber Hord lived in the Central City house until his death in 1949. The house was then occupied by his son Thomas Barge Hord, who had managed the family's Lakeside Ranch since 1931, and who took over the management of the family businesses. The T. B. Hord Grain company showed steadily declining profits from 1950 to 1957, and was liquidated, ending in 1963. Earnings for the Lakeside Ranch and for Hord and Son also declined significantly in the 1960s, and were liquidated in the early 1970s. The sale of the ranch in 1972 marked the end of Hord business operations.

== Description ==
The house is a two-story classic box house designed by Omaha architects Fisher & Lawrie. It underwent a remodelling in 1923, directed by Omaha architect F. A. Henninger.

The frame building faces south. It has a footprint of 56 × 39 feet (17 × 12 m). It has a raised concrete block basement, a hip roof with four hipped dormers, and brick chimneys on the north and east sides. Originally, a porch ran across the entire width of the south side on the first floor, continuing as a carriage portico at the southwest corner; in the 1923 remodelling, the east end of the porch was enclosed to create a sun room.

The interior features a central hall with an open stairway to the second floor. On the first floor, a reception room and sitting room are in the front of the house; to the rear are a den and a formal dining room, which leads to a china pantry and the kitchen. Also on the first floor are a kitchen pantry, a refrigeration area, and the servants' dining room. A bathroom was added below the central stair in the course of the 1923 remodelling. The second floor is taken up with four bedrooms, a sleeping porch, and two bathrooms. Servants' quarters, consisting of a single large room with several closets, occupied the whole of the attic. There are eight basement rooms, including a coal room, laundry room, vegetable cellar, and bathroom.

A frame carriage house at the rear of the property has been converted to a five-stall garage with a one-bedroom apartment above it.

As of 1987, the house and carriage house were assessed as having retained their historic integrity. It was decided that the 1923 remodelling had not significantly changed the character of the 1923 house; many of the original interior furnishing were still present, including hardwood floors, fireplaces, woodwork, and lighting fixtures. Because of this and because of the property's connection to the Hord family, it was listed in the National Register of Historic Places.
