= Martha Ellen Auditorium =

- U.S. National Register of Historic Places
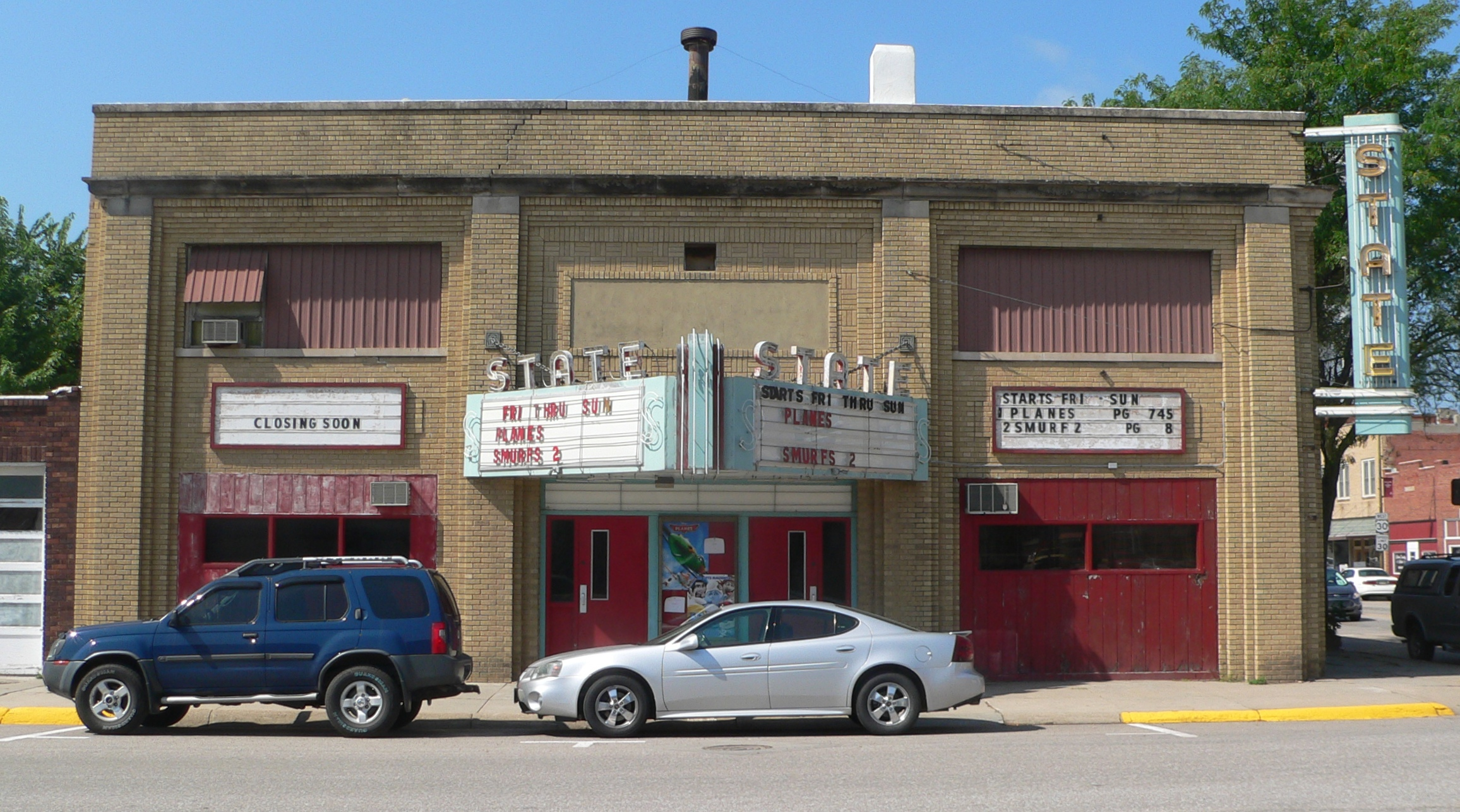
- Viewed from the east.

- Location within Nebraska Location within the United States
- Location: 706 C Ave., Central City, Nebraska
- Coordinates: 41°6′53.0″N 98°0′11.0″W
- Built: 1916
- Architect: Col. William C. Shelton
- Architectural style: One-Part Commercial Block
- MPS: Opera House Buildings in Nebraska 1867-1917
- NRHP reference No.: 88000944
- Added to NRHP: September 28, 1988

The Martha Ellen Auditorium, now the State Theatre, was built in 1916 in Central City, the county seat of Merrick County in the state of Nebraska in the midwestern United States. It is listed in the National Register of Historic Places, as a well-preserved example of a Nebraska opera house.

== History ==
The early 1900s were a time of relative prosperity in Central City, Merrick County, and Nebraska more generally after the recession of the 1890s; this episode of prosperity culminated with World War I (1914–1918), which increased the demand and raised the prices for agricultural products. The early 1900s thus marked a period of considerable growth in Central City with a number of buildings built and businesses established. It was a time before radio or television, when silent movies were only beginning to become available in rural Nebraska. Entertainment was available to rural Nebraskans in the form of musical concerts, comic operas, performances by touring companies, and vaudeville performers, but only if there was a suitable venue.

It was in this context that the opera house was built in 1916 by Colonel William C. Shelton, who named it after his daughter. When the Central City Nonpareil announced the opening of the theater, it declared:

Col. C. Shelton deserves the patronage of every resident of our city as renumeration [sic] for his progressive spirit in giving the play goers of Central City such a house. The investment was prompted by a spirit of community advancement for the returns cannot possibly pay interest on the investment Mr. Shelton is putting into this building (2 Nov. 1916:1).

The new venue furnished a variety of entertainments. A list of events from 1916 and 1917 includes films, among them D. W. Griffith's The Birth of a Nation and The Avenging Conscience, operas, lectures, plays, and a heavyweight wrestling match. Both traveling and local performers occupied the stage: in December 1916, for example, the Martha Ellen presented the opera The Bohemian Girl, staged by the Aborn Opera Company, and the play The Dream That Came True, staged by the local junior class.

Opera-house entertainment went into a decline beginning about the end of World War I. Increases in the cost of rail tickets cut into the profits of traveling companies; even the relatively inexpensive Lyceum Bureau offerings became too costly for small-town halls. The rise in automobile ownership made it possible for more and more people to travel to larger cities for their entertainment rather than making do with what the local venues had to offer. Under these circumstances, the Martha Ellen Auditorium increasingly showed motion pictures, and nothing else, ending its career as a venue for performing arts.

At some point prior to 1988, the name of the establishment was changed to "State Theatre". A marquee bearing that name was added to the building's facade, obscuring the original "Martha Ellen Auditorium" sign. The State Theatre was closed in 2013; the owners cited the cost of changing from film to digital projection equipment as the reason for the closing. The nonprofit State Theater Foundation raised $100,000 to renovate and reopen the theater, using $45,000 of the money to purchase digital projection equipment.

In 1988, the building was listed in the National Register of Historic Places, under the name "Martha Ellen Auditorium".

== Building ==
The Martha Ellen Auditorium (Note: The Martha Ellen Auditorium is referred to as an opera house called "the Academy of Music in Central City" at page 156 in the Federal Writers' Project of the Works Progress Administration for the State of Nebraska (1939). Nebraska: A Guide to the Cornhusker State. The Stratford Press.) is located in the center of the Central City, Nebraska business district. The auditorium is a brick One-Part Commercial Block structure approximately 80 × 58 feet (24 × 18 m). The exterior of the building has minimal decorative brick trim and broad inset panels.

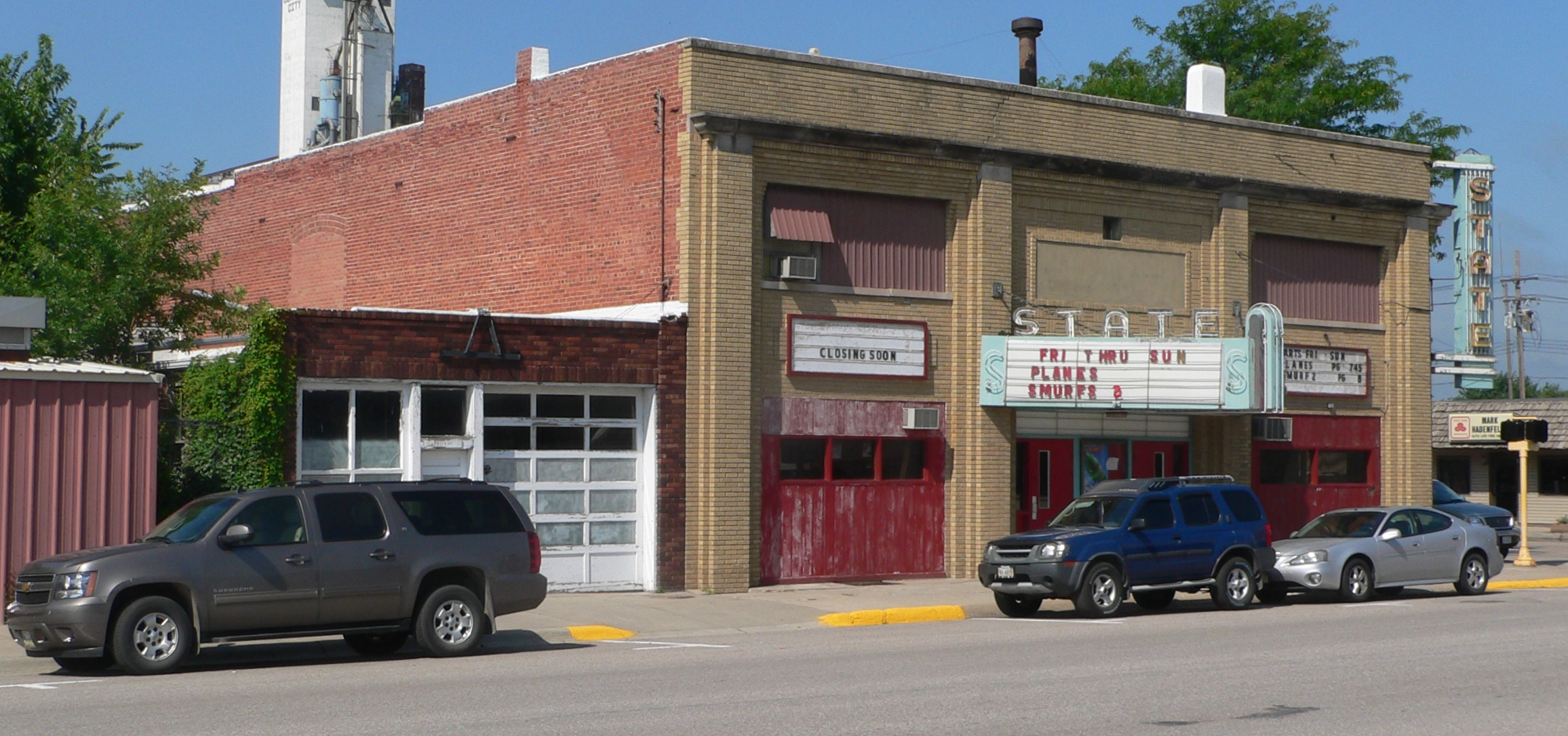
State Theater (formerly Martha Ellen Auditorium) viewed from the southeast.

It has a flat roof and is divided into bays (three bays on the front and five bays on the side) by full height brick pilasters supporting a wall cornice with a parapet wall above. Brick corbeling further characterizes the façades. The original windows on the second floor still exist but have been boarded up. The retail spaces on the lower level originally housed specialty stores, including a barbershop. Alterations were made both to these storefronts and interiors since the auditorium was built. A marquee and sign were added when the building became the State Theater.

The original Martha Ellen Auditorium sign is still on the building but hidden by the State Theatre movie marquee. The auditorium is accessed through doors under the current movie margues. The lobby immediately inside the doors is approximately 13 feet (4.0 m) in depth.

The lobby has been remodeled since the original auditorium was built. The auditorium is entered from the lobby, and it is approximately 51 × 56 feet (16 × 17 m). It has no windows. The sides of the proscenium walls, outside of the arch, are curved. The original boxes there have been covered, and the rails hidden behind the covering. The now hidden stage-left box once functioned as a barber shop.

The horseshoe-shaped balcony is 9.5 feet (2.9 m) deep on the sides, and it extends all the way around the auditorium to the proscenium wall. The sides of the balcony have three rows of seats, while the middle-rear has six rows. A 13 feet (4.0 m) deep projection booth is centered behind the middle-rear six rows of seats. Two sets of stairs along the walls of the auditorium lead to the balcony. Pillars are located around the edges of the balcony. Many of the original opera chairs remain in the balcony, but on the lower floor, the original seats have been replaced by conventional movie seats. Aisles are carpeted, and the pink-tinted peach colored plaster walls maintain their original color scheme.

The proscenium arch is 22 feet (6.7 m) wide and approximately 14 feet (4.3 m) high. The wings (17 feet (5.2 m) long) contain movie speakers. The backstage area is entered through a door to the extreme stage right of proscenium wall. The stage is 15 feet (4.6 m) deep from the curtain line to the back wall. The dressing rooms no longer exist, but they were under the stage. In all other respects, the structural and historical integrity of the building and auditorium have been preserved.
