= Palmer, Nebraska =

- Village
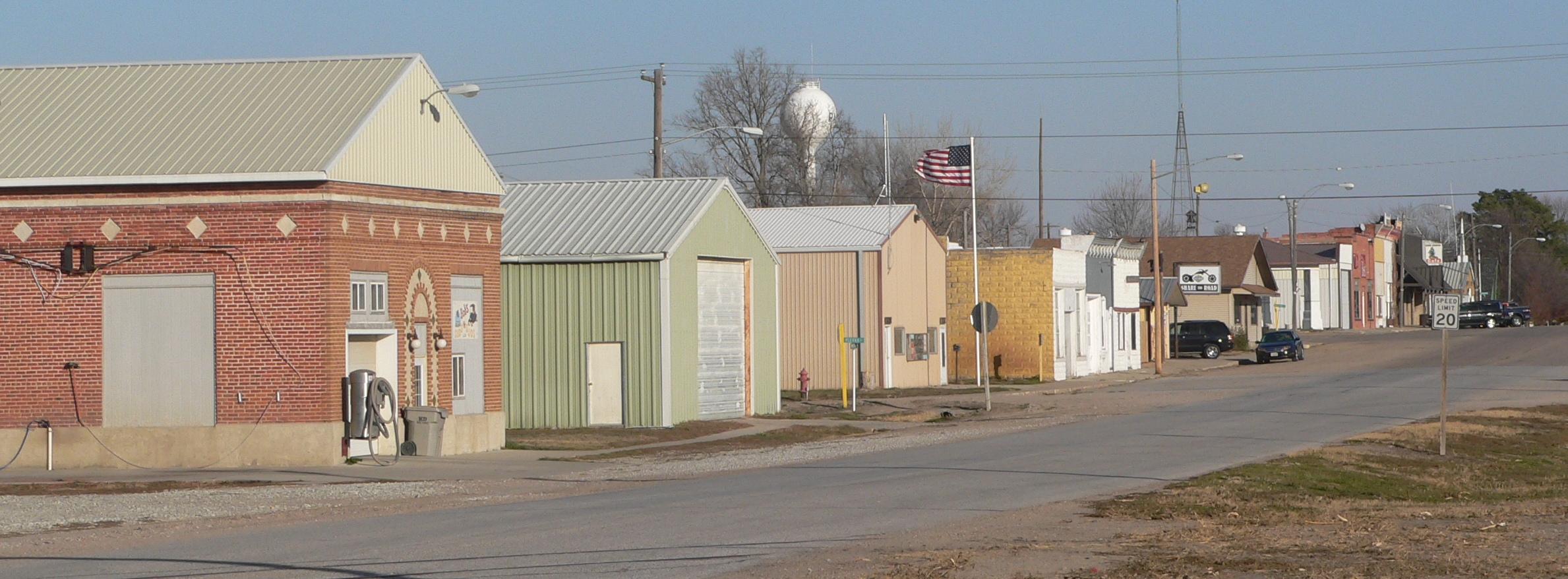
- Downtown Palmer: Commercial Street

- Location in Merrick County and the state of Nebraska
- Coordinates: 41°13′21″N 98°15′35″W
- Country: United States
- State: Nebraska
- County: Merrick

Area
  - Total: 0.53 sq mi (1.38 km^{2})
  - Land: 0.53 sq mi (1.38 km^{2})
  - Water: 0 sq mi (0.00 km^{2})
- Elevation: 1,795 ft (547 m)

Population (2020)
  - Total: 439
  - Density: 823.0/sq mi (317.77/km^{2})
- Time zone: UTC-6 (Central (CST))
  - Summer (DST): UTC-5 (CDT)
- ZIP code: 68864
- Area code: 308
- FIPS code: 31-38160
- GNIS feature ID: 2399613
- Website: www.villageofpalmer.com

Palmer is a village in Merrick County, Nebraska, United States. The population was 439 at the 2020 census. It is part of the Grand Island metropolitan area.

== History ==
Palmer got its start in the 1880s, following construction of the Lincoln and Black Hills Railroad through the territory. It was named for H. E. Palmer, a railroad official.

== Geography ==
Palmer is in northwestern Merrick County, 20 miles (32 km) by road northwest of Central City, the county seat, and 12 miles (19 km) east of St. Paul. It is 2 miles (3 km) north of Nebraska Highway 92.

According to the U.S. Census Bureau, the village has a total area of 0.53 square miles (1.37 km^{2}), all land. Land in the village drains toward the Loup River, 4 miles (6 km) to the north.

== Demographics ==
Historical population
Census	Pop.	Note	%±
1910	373		—
1920	577		54.7%
1930	588		1.9%
1940	516		−12.2%
1950	434		−15.9%
1960	418		−3.7%
1970	391		−6.5%
1980	487		24.6%
1990	753		54.6%
2000	472		−37.3%
2010	472		0.0%
2020	439		−7.0%
U.S. Decennial Census

=== 2010 census ===
As of the census of 2010, there were 472 people, 171 households, and 115 families residing in the village. The population density was 890.6 inhabitants per square mile (343.9/km^{2}). There were 192 housing units at an average density of 362.3 per square mile (139.9/km^{2}). The racial makeup of the village was 95.6% White, 0.8% African American, 0.4% Native American, 0.4% Asian, 2.3% from other races, and 0.4% from two or more races. Hispanic or Latino of any race were 4.7% of the population.

There were 171 households, of which 32.2% had children under the age of 18 living with them, 52.6% were married couples living together, 8.2% had a female householder with no husband present, 6.4% had a male householder with no wife present, and 32.7% were non-families. 27.5% of all households were made up of individuals, and 16.4% had someone living alone who was 65 years of age or older. The average household size was 2.44 and the average family size was 2.94.

The median age in the village was 40.5 years. 21.2% of residents were under the age of 18; 8.6% were between the ages of 18 and 24; 25.7% were from 25 to 44; 31% were from 45 to 64; and 13.6% were 65 years of age or older. The gender makeup of the village was 50.4% male and 49.6% female.

=== 2000 census ===
As of the census of the year 2000, there were 472 people, 189 households, and 122 families residing in the village. The population density was 891.8 inhabitants per square mile (344.3/km^{2}). There were 202 housing units at an average density of 381.7 per square mile (147.4/km^{2}). The racial makeup of the village was 98.94% White, 0.21% Asian, 0.64% from other races, and 0.21% from two or more races. Hispanic or Latino of any race were 1.69% of the population.

There were 189 households, out of which 30.7% had children under the age of 18 living with them, 56.6% were married couples living together, 6.9% had a female householder with no husband present, and 35.4% were non-families. 30.7% of all households were made up of individuals, and 16.4% had someone living alone who was 65 years of age or older. The average household size was 2.37 and the average family size was 2.98.

In the village the population was spread out, with 26.1% under the age of 18, 6.1% from 18 to 24, 24.2% from 25 to 44, 20.8% from 45 to 64, and 22.9% who were 65 years of age or older. The median age was 40 years. For every 100 females, there were 91.9 males. For every 100 females age 18 and over, there were 87.6 males.

As of 2000 the median income for a household in the village was $33,676, and the median income for a family was $37,969. Males had a median income of $25,673 versus $19,000 for females. The per capita income for the village was $16,589. About 9.3% of families and 8.1% of the population were below the poverty line, including 11.9% of those under age 18 and 8.5% of those age 65 or over.
