= Silver Creek =

Silver Creek may refer to:

== Places ==
=== Australia ===
- Silver Creek, Queensland, a locality in the Whitsunday Region

=== Belize ===
- Silver Creek, Belize, a village in the Toledo District of Belize

=== Canada ===
- Rural Municipality of Silver Creek, Parkland Region, Manitoba
- Silver Creek, Ontario, a community of Halton Hills
- Silver Creek, British Columbia (Hope), a community in the district municipality of Hope, British Columbia
- Silver Creek, British Columbia (CSRD), an unincorporated community in the Columbia-Shuswap Regional District (CSRD)

=== United States ===
- Silver Creek, California, a former settlement in Plumas County
- Silver Creek High School (California), a high school in San Jose which is operated by the East Side Union High School District
- Silver Creek, Colorado, a mining ghost town
- Silver Creek, Georgia, an unincorporated community in Floyd County
- Silver Creek, Lake County, Minnesota, an unincorporated community
- Silver Creek, Wright County, Minnesota, an unincorporated community
- Silver Creek, Mississippi, a town in Lawrence County
- Silver Creek, Missouri, a village in Newton County
- Silver Creek, Nebraska, a village in Merrick County
- Silver Creek, New York, a village in Chautauqua County
- Silver Creek, Ohio, an unincorporated community
- Silver Creek, Tennessee, an unincorporated community
- Silver Creek, Washington, an unincorporated community in Lewis County
- Silver Creek, Wisconsin, an unincorporated community
- Silver Creek Township (disambiguation)

== Streams ==
=== Canada ===
- Big Silver Creek, a major feeder stream of Harrison Lake, British Columbia
- Silver Creek (Huron County, Ontario), a tributary of the Bayfield River in Huron County, Ontario

=== United States ===
- Silver Creek (Arizona), a stream located in the White Mountains of Arizona north of Show Low
- Upper Silver Creek (Coyote Creek tributary), a tributary of Coyote Creek in San Jose, California
- Lower Silver Creek (Coyote Creek tributary), a tributary of Coyote Creek in San Jose, California
- Silver Creek (Georgia)
- Silver Creek (Idaho), a spring-fed creek in south-central Idaho
- Silver Creek (Eel River tributary), a stream in Indiana
- Silver Creek (Ohio River tributary), a stream in southern Indiana
- Silver Creek (Kentucky), a creek in Madison County, Kentucky
- Silver Creek (East Fork Little Chariton River tributary), a stream in Missouri
- Silver Creek (Shoal Creek tributary), a stream in Missouri
- Silver Creek (Nebraska), in Jefferson and Washington counties, Nebraska
- Silver Creek (Oregon) (disambiguation), many different creeks in Oregon
- Silver Creek (Saucon Creek tributary), in Northampton County, Pennsylvania
- Silver Creek (Susquehanna River tributary), in Snyder County, Pennsylvania
- Silver Creek (Utah), in Summit County, Utah
- Silver Creek (West Virginia), a stream in West Virginia

== Other ==
- Silver Creek Entertainment, a video game developer of classic card games

== See also ==
- Silver Creek Township (disambiguation)
