= Silver Creek Township, Nebraska =

Silver Creek Township, Nebraska may refer to the following places:

- Silver Creek Township, Burt County, Nebraska
- Silver Creek Township, Merrick County, Nebraska

See also

- Silvercreek Township, Dixon County, Nebraska
- Silver Creek Township (disambiguation)
