= Archer, Nebraska =

- Census-designated place
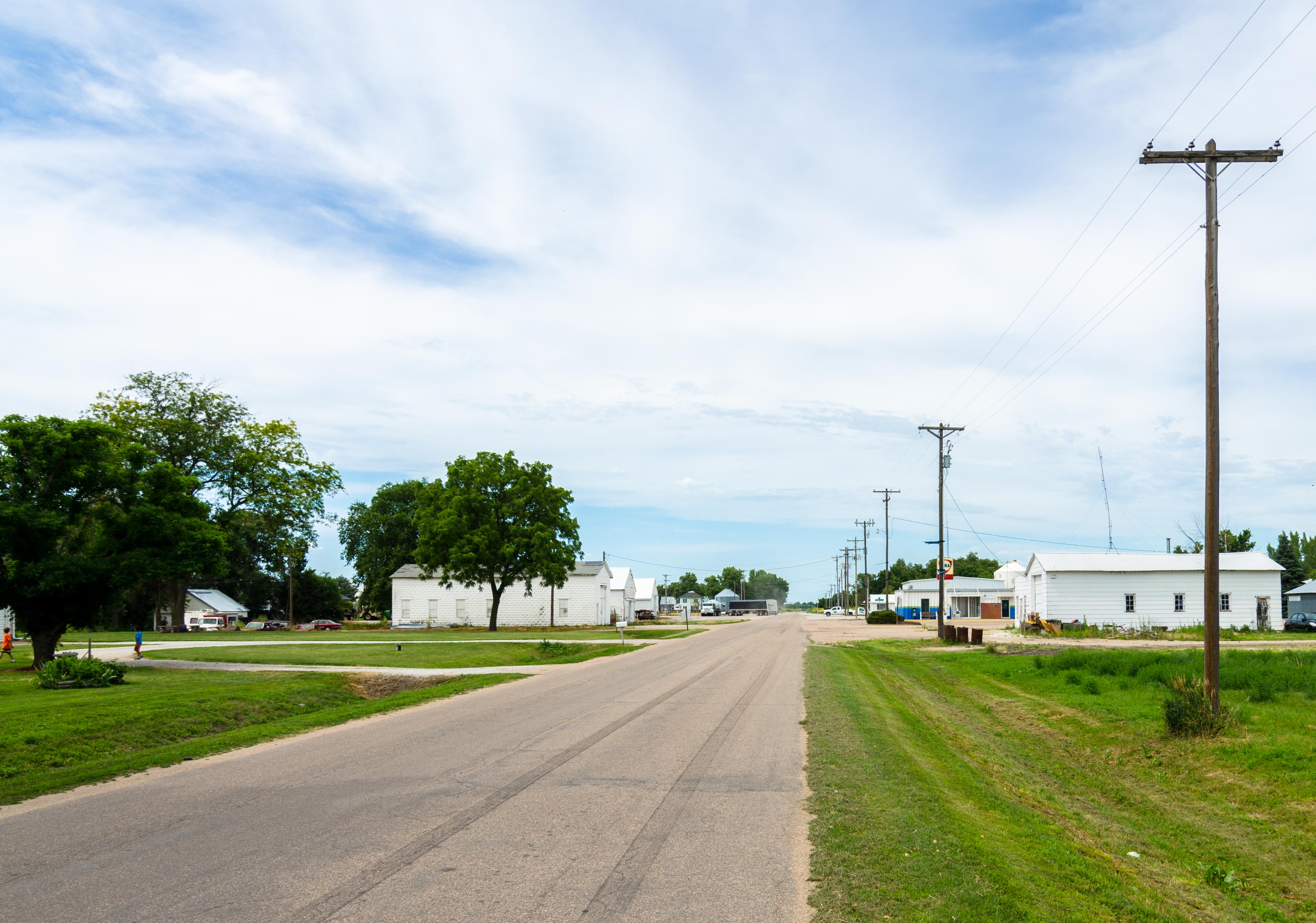
- Archer Road in Archer

- Location within Nebraska Location within the United States
- Coordinates: 41°10′00″N 98°08′20″W
- Country: United States
- State: Nebraska
- County: Merrick

Area
  - Total: 1.00 sq mi (2.60 km^{2})
  - Land: 1.00 sq mi (2.60 km^{2})
  - Water: 0 sq mi (0.00 km^{2})
- Elevation: 1,745 ft (532 m)

Population (2020)
  - Total: 68
  - Density: 67.8/sq mi (26.19/km^{2})
- Time zone: UTC-6 (Central (CST))
  - Summer (DST): UTC-5 (CDT)
- ZIP code: 68816
- FIPS code: 31-01920
- GNIS feature ID: 2583872

Archer is an unincorporated community and census-designated place (CDP) in northwestern Merrick County, Nebraska, United States. As of the 2020 census the population was 68. The Archer post office carries the ZIP Code 68816.

== History ==
The community is named for Robert T. Archer. A post office was established at Archer in 1887, and it is still in use.

== Geography ==
Archer is in northwestern Merrick County, lying along local roads south of Nebraska Highway 92 and about 10 miles (16 km) northwest of Central City, the county seat.

According to the U.S. Census Bureau, the Archer CDP has an area of 1.00 square mile (2.59 km^{2}), all of it recorded as land. Prairie Creek passes through the south side of the community, flowing northeast to join the Platte River between Silver Creek and Columbus.

== Demographics ==
Historical population
Census	Pop.	Note	%±
2010	81		—
2020	68		−16.0%
U.S. Decennial Census
