= Floyd County School District =

School district in Georgia (U.S. state)

Address
- 600 Riverside Parkway Northeast Rome, Georgia, 30161-2936; United States
- Coordinates: 34.276715°N 85.169970°W

District information
- Grades: Pre-kindergarten – 12
- Superintendent: Glenn White
- Accreditations: Southern Association of Colleges and Schools; Georgia Accrediting Commission

Students and staff
- Enrollment: 8,925 (2022–23)
- Faculty: 630.50 (FTE)
- Staff: 655.30 (FTE)
- Student–teacher ratio: 14.16

Other information
- Telephone: (706) 234-1031
- Website: floydboe.net

The Floyd County School District was founded in 1888 and is a public school district in Floyd County, Georgia, United States. Its headquarters has a Rome postal address but lies outside of the Rome city limits.

It serves the communities in the county outside of the city of Rome. They include Cave Spring, Lindale, Livingston, Mount Berry, Shannon, and Silver Creek.

It is also the public school district serving the faculty housing on the property of Berry College.

Rome City School District serves areas in the Rome city limits.

== Schools ==
The Floyd County School District has six elementary schools, two primary schools, three middle schools, and four high schools.

=== Elementary schools ===
- Alto Park Elementary School
- Armuchee Elementary School
- Cave Spring Elementary School (closed May 2022)
- Garden Lakes Elementary School
- Johnson Elementary School
- Model Elementary School
- Pepperell Elementary School

=== Primary schools ===
- Pepperell Primary School
- Glenwood Primary School (closed May 2022)
- Armuchee Primary School (opened August 2022)

=== Middle schools ===
- Armuchee Middle School (closed May 2022, building transitioned to Armuchee Elementary School in August 2022)
- Coosa Middle School
- Model Middle School
- Pepperell Middle School

=== High schools ===
- Armuchee High School
- Coosa High School
- Model High School
- Pepperell High School

=== System programs ===
- Floyd County Schools College & Career Academy

== Former schools ==
- McHenry Primary School - Rome postal address
  - In 2018 McHenry Primary had approximately 100 enrolled, making it the district's school with the lowest enrollment. The district analyzed demographic trends which showed a projected further decrease in students. In 2018 the board of education agreed to close the school. The closure was to be effective summer 2019, and the former McHenry was to house Pepperell Primary students while Pepperell Middle School students would temporarily occupy Pepperell Primary School while the middle school was demolished and rebuilt.

== Reports of Racism ==
Reports of racism by teachers and some white students at Coosa High School against African-American students, and the refusal of the Floyd County School District to take action against the racist behavior have resulted in the school district and board of education in Floyd County being sued by the students and mothers of the students. The lawsuit also cites the incident of students wearing Black Lives Matter T-shirts have been suspended, despite the fact the school has taken no action against racist students who used racial slurs against African-American students who carried the Confederate flag on school grounds at Coosa High School.
