= Vieregg =

Vieregg may refer to one of the following:

- Artur Vieregg, German figure skater
- Elisabeth Helene von Vieregg (1679-1704), German-Danish countess and wife of Frederick IV of Denmark
- Vieregg Township, Merrick County, Nebraska
