= Randy Johnson (offensive lineman) =

American gridiron football player (born 1953)

No. 65
- Position: Offensive guard

Personal information
- Born: January 2, 1953 (age 73); Rome, Georgia, U.S.
- Listed height: 6 ft 2 in (1.88 m)
- Listed weight: 255 lb (116 kg)

Career information
- High school: Pepperell (Lindale, Georgia)
- College: Georgia (1971–1975)
- NFL draft: 1976: 4th round, 122nd overall pick

Career history
- Seattle Seahawks (1976)*; Tampa Bay Buccaneers (1977–1978); Edmonton Eskimos (1980)*; Saskatchewan Roughriders (1980)*
- * Offseason or practice squad member only

Awards and highlights
- Consensus All-American (1975); Jacobs Blocking Trophy (1975); 2× First-team All-SEC (1974, 1975)

Career NFL statistics
- Games played: 22
- Games started: 1
- Stats at Pro Football Reference

Robert Randall Johnson (born January 2, 1953) is an American former professional football player who was an offensive guard for two seasons with the Tampa Bay Buccaneers of the National Football League (NFL). He played college football for the Georgia Bulldogs, earning consensus All-American honors in 1975. Johnson was selected by the Seattle Seahawks in the fourth round of the 1976 NFL draft.

== Early life ==
Johnson participated in high school football, wrestling, basketball, baseball and track at Pepperell High School in Lindale, Georgia. He was an All-area fullback and middle guard in football. The football team was 9-1 his senior year. He won the unlimited weight division in the Northwest Georgia High School wrestling tournament in 1970 and 1971. Johnson was the Region 7AA Champion in the unlimited weight division in 1970 as well. In 1971, he was the state champion of Georgia High School wrestling in the unlimited division. He was the runner-up in the state his junior year. Johnson participated in the State Track and Field competition in discus and shot put in 1971. He was also a letterman in basketball and baseball. He was inducted into the Rome-Floyd Sports Hall of Fame in 1977.

== College career ==
Johnson played for the Georgia Bulldogs from 1971 to 1975. He was redshirted in 1972. He was a three-year starter and letterman from 1973 to 1975. Johnson was named to the Gridiron News All-SEC team and played in the Peach Bowl in 1973. He was named to the Pre-Season All-American Team, played in the Tangerine Bowl and earned UPI All-SEC honors in 1974. He was named to the Pre-Season All-American Team, earned AP and UPI All-SEC honors and garnered consensus All-American recognition his senior season in 1975. Johnson was also named Offensive Lineman of the Year by the Atlanta Touchdown Club, Southeastern Conference Lineman of the Year by the Birmingham Monday Morning Quarterback Club and College Offensive Lineman of the Year by the 100% Wrong Club. He was awarded the Jacobs Blocking Trophy for being the best blocker in the SEC, the William K. Jenkins Award as Georgia's best lineman and the Whitworth Memorial Trophy by the Muscogee County Bulldog Club for being Georgia's outstanding lineman in 1975. He was the offensive captain of the 1975 Bulldogs team. Johnson also played in the Cotton Bowl, Hula Bowl, the first Japan Bowl and the Coaches All-America Game in 1975. He took classes at Floyd Junior College and then finished his degree at Georgia in 1984.

== Professional career ==
Johnson was selected by the Seattle Seahawks in the fourth round with the 122nd overall pick in the 1976 NFL draft. He was released by the Seahawks in September 1976 before the start of the 1976 season.

Johnson signed with the Tampa Bay Buccaneers in 1977. He played in 22 games, starting one, for the Buccaneers from 1977 to 1978. He suffered a back injury and was later released by the Buccaneers in 1979.

Johnson signed with the Edmonton Eskimos of the Canadian Football League (CFL) on May 8, 1980. On June 13, 1980, it was reported that he had been waived.

Johnson was then claimed off waivers by the CFL's Saskatchewan Roughriders. He was released by the Roughriders June 19, 1980.

== Coaching career ==
Johnson spent time as an assistant football coach at Coosa High School in Rome, Georgia. He also coached at Pepperell High School where the team won the State championship in 1990. He then was head coach at Model High School and then returned to Pepperell. He ended his career at Cartersville where he retired.

== Impostor ==
An impostor claiming to be Johnson played for the Orlando Americans of the American Football Association in 1981. The impostor was Robert Lee Johnson, who stole Randy Johnson's identity in an effort to improve his odds of making the Americans squad.
