= Lindale Mill =

Coordinates: 34°11′20″N 85°10′36″W

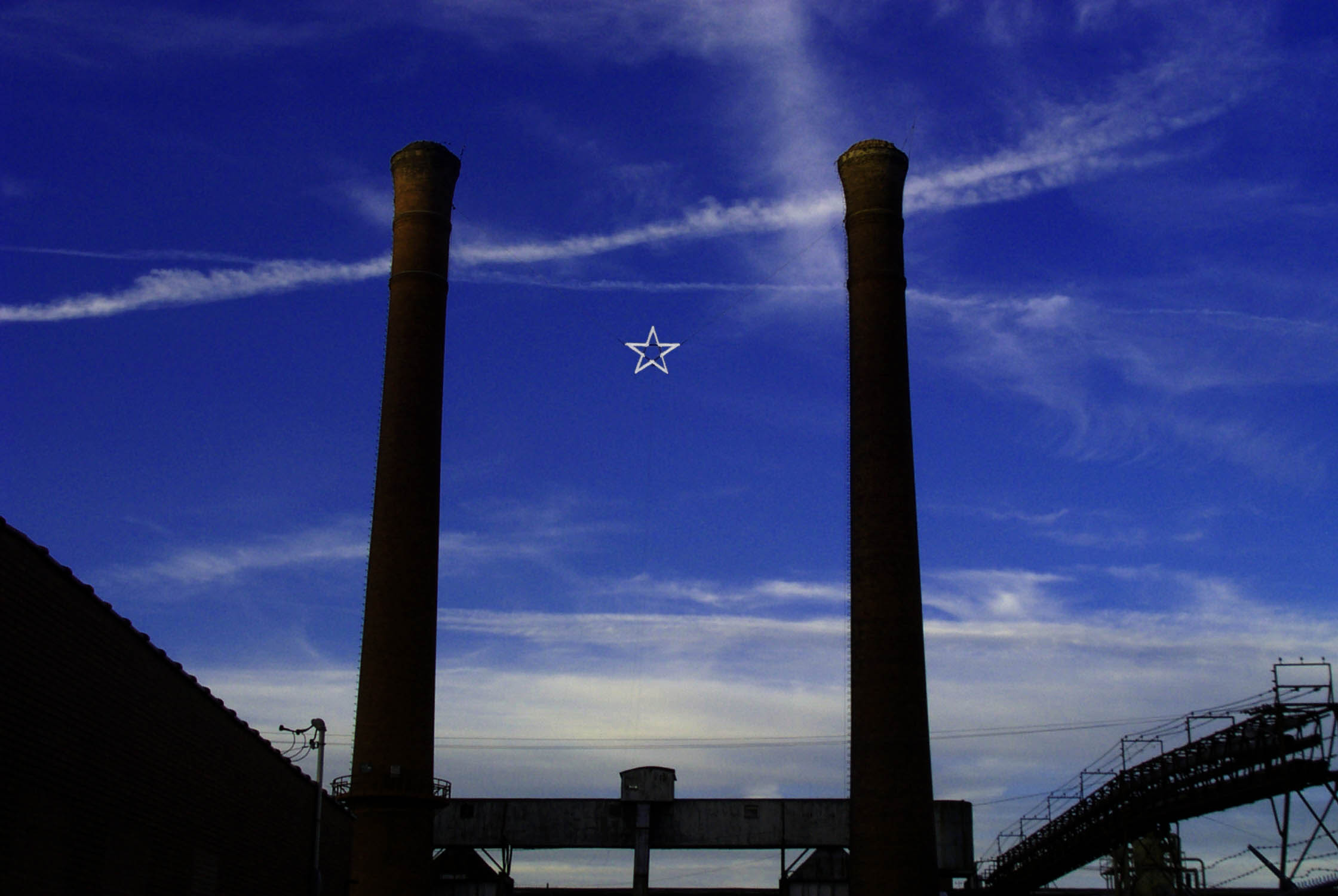
The Lindale Mill smokestacks with a Christmas star hanging between them.

The Lindale Mill is located in the small community of Lindale, Georgia, just outside the larger town of Rome, Floyd County, Georgia.

== History ==
In 1896, Massachusetts Mills opened a new mill in Lindale, Georgia. The mill produced 1/7 of all textiles in Georgia. 1,393 people were employed by the mill in 1903. In 1926, the mill was sold to Pepperell Manufacturing Company, giving the community and school the name Pepperell. At the time, the country was in the middle of a debate on child labor. Children as young as twelve (some say nine) were working with the same weaving and spinning machines as adults and under the same conditions. Many people disagreed with child labor, bringing laws which regulated the age of employees. In 1931 during the Great Depression a few mill employees built a wooden star as a sign of HOPE, lined with lights to hang between the two smoke stacks at Christmas, starting an annual tradition in Lindale. The star has been hung between the two smoke stacks almost every year during the Christmas Holidays. Boston Red Sox pitcher and Taylorsville native Willard Nixon worked at the mill in the winter months during his 9-year major league career (1950 - 1958).

== Closing of the mill ==
After 105 years of manufacturing, the mill closed on September 24, 2001. It couldn't compete as the textiles moved overseas. The closure dealt a huge blow to the economy of Floyd County, and to the community of Lindale. In 2004 a 70-year-old tradition of hanging a Christmas star between the smoke stacks also briefly ended. As the Mill gave way to demolition and reclaiming of the heart pine lumber and antique bricks, the community of Lindale sat in quiet darkness for the next 9 years. In 2010, the Lindale Mill was purchased by the Silva family out of Seattle. In 2013, the new owners began working with the Lindale community trying to clean up the Mill area and surrounding Silver Creek, bringing pride to Lindale. In 2013, Restoration Lindale working with the new owners, restored the Christmas Star hanging tradition, bringing thousands of families and past employees back to Lindale for an annual Star Lighting ceremony. The ceremony is held in November.

The Lindale Mill is currently being used for small to large movie production filming, photography location and a wedding and events venue. The site offers 23 acres existing old brick buildings, large open spaces with bridges, dams, a running creek, large metal industrial windows, and the existing boiler building, which is held up by some of Andrew Carnegie Steel dates back to 1893. In 1903 Carnegie Steel Co was Sold to J.P Morgan for 480 Million US Dollars. The old mill has a new honor of being considered by Movie Locators who have expressed their opinion there are few similar authentic locations still existing in Georgia. It has become a highly sought after location for the filming production industry within Georgia, once again bringing pride and service to the hometown it honors.
