= Havens, Nebraska =

Unincorporated community in Nebraska, U.S.

Coordinates: 41°15′55″N 97°44′59″W

Havens is an unincorporated community within the township of Silver Creek in Merrick County, Nebraska, United States.

== History ==
Havens was a station on the Union Pacific Railroad. A post office was established at Havens in 1919, and remained in operation until it was discontinued in 1934.
