= Mead Township =

Mead Township may refer to one of the following places in the United States:

- Mead Township, Merrick County, Nebraska
- Mead Township, Belmont County, Ohio
- Mead Township, Pennsylvania
