= Prairie Island =

Prairie Island may refer to:

- Prairie Island Indian Community in Minnesota
- Prairie Island Nuclear Power Plant located nearby
- Prairie Island Township, Merrick County, Nebraska
