= Silver Creek Township, Minnesota =

Silver Creek Township is the name of some places in the U.S. state of Minnesota:

- Silver Creek Township, Lake County, Minnesota
- Silver Creek Township, Wright County, Minnesota

== See also ==
- Silver Creek Township (disambiguation)
