= Lockwood, Nebraska =

Unincorporated community in Nebraska, U.S.

Coordinates: 40°58′12″N 98°14′40″W

Lockwood is an unincorporated community in Merrick County, Nebraska, United States.

== History ==
Lockwood was a station on the Union Pacific Railroad.

A post office was established at Lockwood in 1874 and has since closed.
