= Hal Griggs (baseball) =

American baseball player (1928-2005)

- Pitcher
- Born: August 24, 1928; Shannon, Georgia, U.S.
- Died: May 10, 2005 (aged 76); Tucson, Arizona, U.S.
- Batted: Right Threw: Right

MLB debut
- April 18, 1956, for the Washington Senators

Last MLB appearance
- September 25, 1959, for the Washington Senators

MLB statistics
- Win–loss record: 6–26
- Earned run average: 5.50
- Strikeouts: 172
- Stats at Baseball Reference

Teams
- Washington Senators (1956–1959)

Harold Lloyd Griggs (August 24, 1928 – May 10, 2005) was an American professional baseball player, a right-handed pitcher who appeared in three full seasons and part of another between 1956 and 1959 for the Washington Senators of Major League Baseball. A native of Shannon, Georgia, Griggs stood 6 feet (1.8 m) tall, weighed 170 pounds (77 kg) and batted right-handed.

Griggs was a workhorse as a minor league pitcher, logging over 200 innings pitched for his first six seasons (1950–1955) in professional baseball, including stints with Washington's Charlotte Hornets and Chattanooga Lookouts minor league affiliates. In the Majors, he was a starting pitcher in 45 of his 105 total appearances. Pitching for second-division and cellar-dwelling Washington teams, he compiled a poor .188 winning percentage, winning six games and losing 26, and surrendering 372 hits in 347 innings pitched. He also walked more batters than he struck out, 209 to 172.

According to a 1993 Sports Illustrated article, Griggs was married on a Hickory, North Carolina, pitching mound before a minor league game in 1952. Asked why, he said: "I couldn't hit, so there was no sense getting married at home plate." Griggs enjoyed the night life of a Major League player, telling a Washington teammate, "I'm only going to be here once on this earth, and I'm really going to live it up."

Griggs pitched professionally into the 1963 season before retiring from the game, and died at age 76 in Tucson, Arizona.
