= Armuchee High School =

Public high school in Floyd County, Georgia, United States

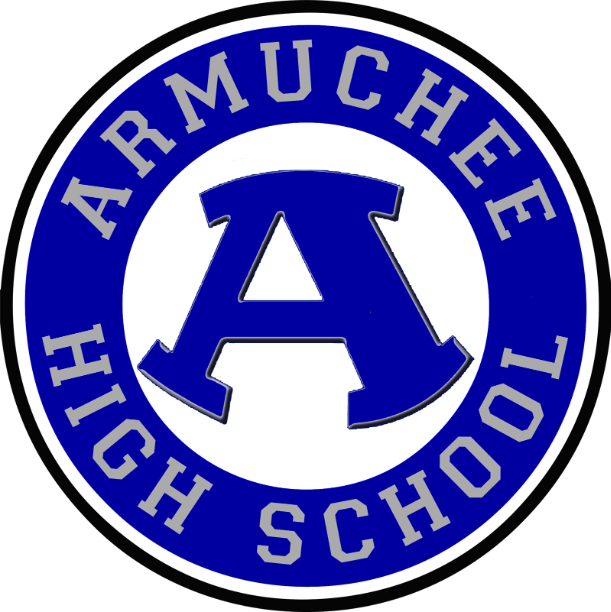

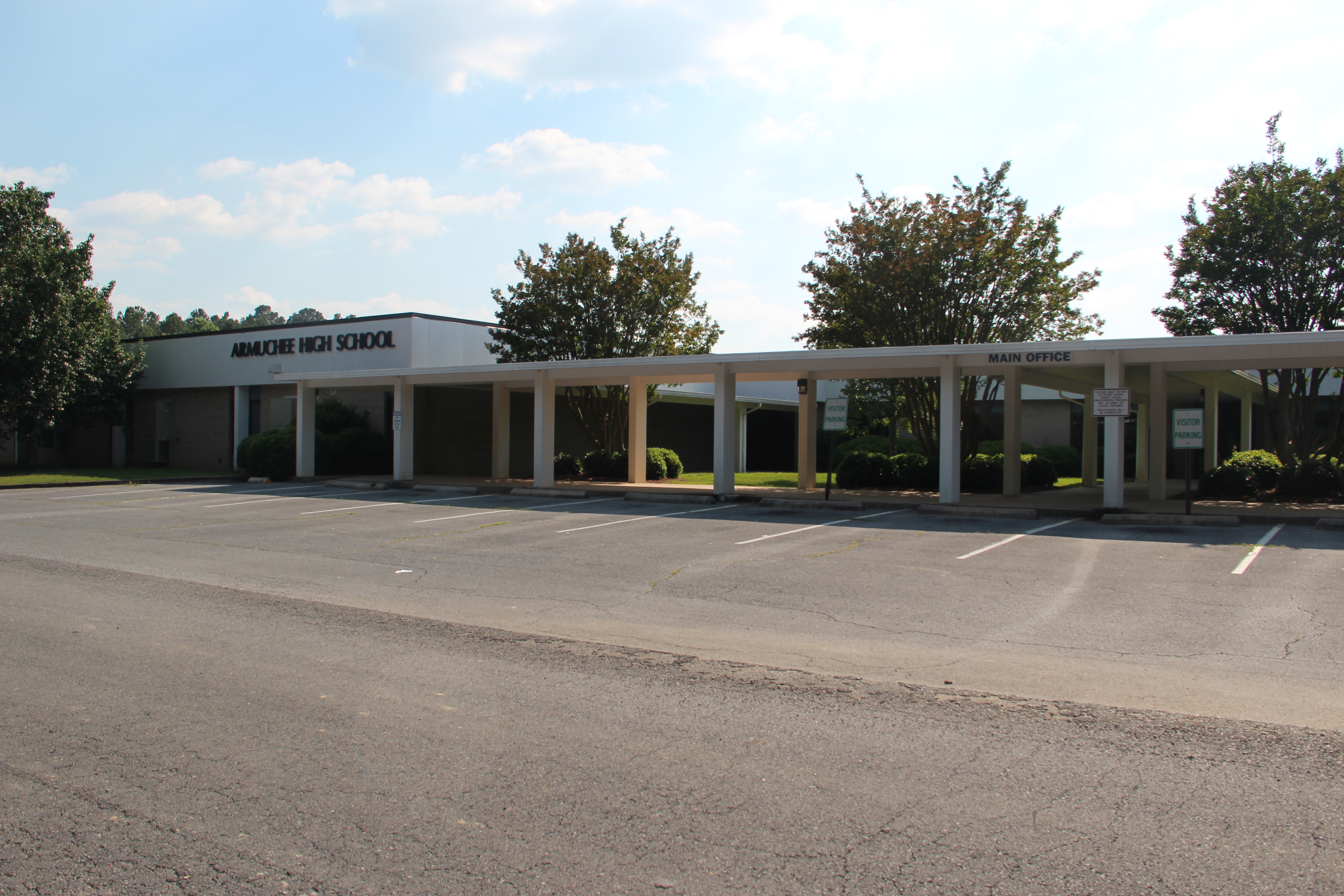

Location
- 4203 Martha Berry Highway; Rome postal address, Georgia 30165; United States; 34°20′34″N 85°10′21″W

Information
- Type: Public
- Motto: Tribe and True
- Established: 1982
- School district: Floyd County School District
- Superintendent: Glenn White
- School code: 110095
- NCES School ID: 1302190
- Principal: Joseph Pethel
- Teaching staff: 50.50 (on an FTE basis)
- Grades: 7-12
- Enrollment: 820 (2023–2024)
- Student to teacher ratio: 16.24
- Colors: Blue, white, and silver
- Athletics conference: 7 South
- Nickname: Tribe
- Accreditation: Cognia
- Newspaper: Tribe Tribune
- Yearbook: The Streamer
- Website: ahs.floydboe.net
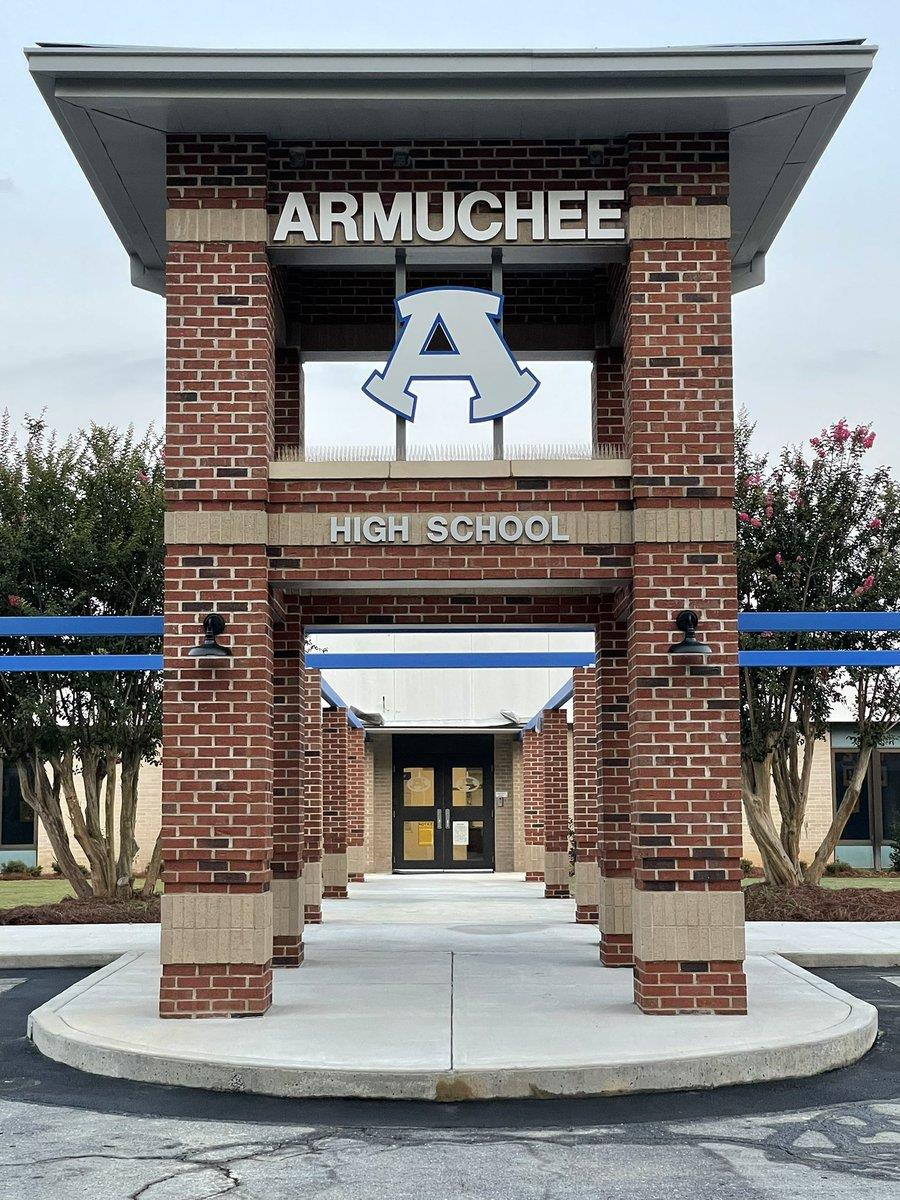

Armuchee High School is a public high school in unincorporated Floyd County, Georgia, United States, with a Rome postal address. It serves grades 7-12 for the Floyd County School District.

Its service area includes the faculty housing of Berry College.

== Academics ==
The school offers Advanced Placement (AP) classes and students have the option to take postsecondary courses through Georgia Highlands College.

== Notable alumni ==
- Jamie Barton, singer
