= Model High School =

Public high school in Shannon, Georgia, United States

Location
- 3252 Calhoun Highway; Rome, Georgia 30161; United States
- Coordinates: 34°18′25″N 85°05′43″W

Information
- Type: Public secondary school
- Established: August 1901
- School district: Floyd County School District
- CEEB code: 112725
- Principal: Kevin Strickland
- Teaching staff: 51.20 (on an FTE basis)
- Grades: 8-12
- Enrollment: 919 (2023-2024)
- Student to teacher ratio: 17.95
- Campus type: Rural fringe
- Colors: Blue, black and white
- Athletics conference: GHSA 7-A
- Nickname: Blue Devils
- Website: mhs.floydboe.net

Model High School is a public high school in Shannon, Georgia, United States. It serves grades 8–12 in the Floyd County School District.

Shannon is in the school's attendance boundary.
