= Worms, Nebraska =

- Unincorporated community
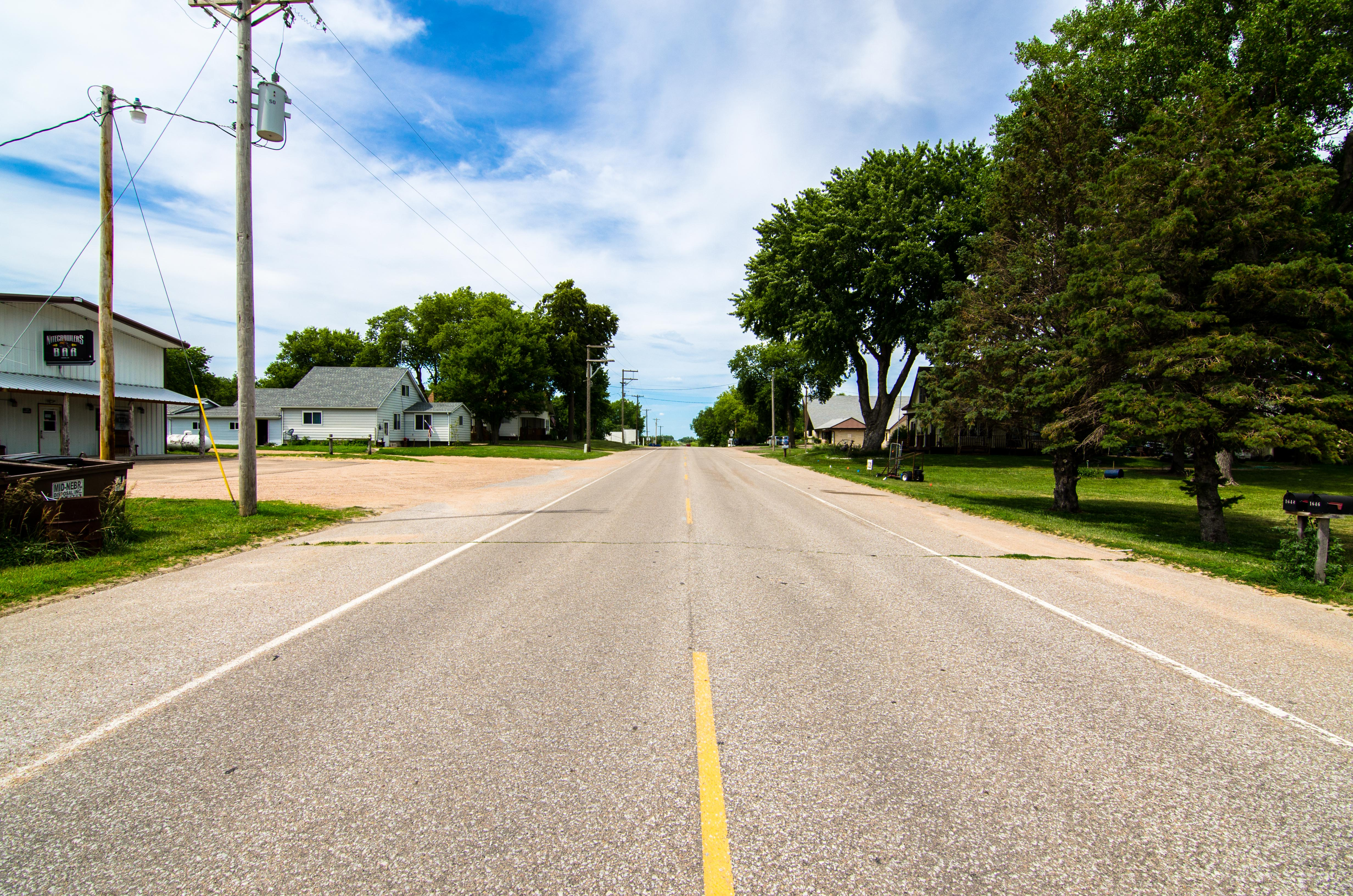
- Worms Road in Worms

- Location within the state of Nebraska
- Coordinates: 41°05′50″N 98°16′08″W
- Country: United States
- State: Nebraska
- County: Merrick
- Elevation: 1,801 ft (549 m)
- Time zone: UTC-6 (Central (CST))
  - Summer (DST): UTC-5 (CDT)
- ZIP code: 68872
- FIPS code: 31-53800
- GNIS feature ID: 834877

Worms is an unincorporated community in Merrick County, Nebraska, United States.

== History ==
Worms had a post office between 1897 and 1902. The community was likely named after Worms, Germany.
