= Clarksville Township, Merrick County, Nebraska =

Clarksville Township
- Township
- Location in Merrick County
- Coordinates: 41°15′17″N 097°51′16″W
- Country: United States
- State: Nebraska
- County: Merrick

Area
  - Total: 70.4 sq mi (182.4 km^{2})
  - Land: 69.8 sq mi (180.7 km^{2})
  - Water: 0.66 sq mi (1.7 km^{2}) 0.93%
- Elevation: 1,614 ft (492 m)

Population (2020)
  - Total: 643
  - Density: 9.22/sq mi (3.56/km^{2})
- GNIS feature ID: 0837921

Clarksville Township is one of eleven townships in Merrick County, Nebraska, United States. The population was 643 at the 2020 census. A 2021 estimate placed the township's population at 640.

The Village of Clarks lies within the Township.

== See also ==
- County government in Nebraska
