= Shannon, Georgia =

- Census-designated place Unincorporated community
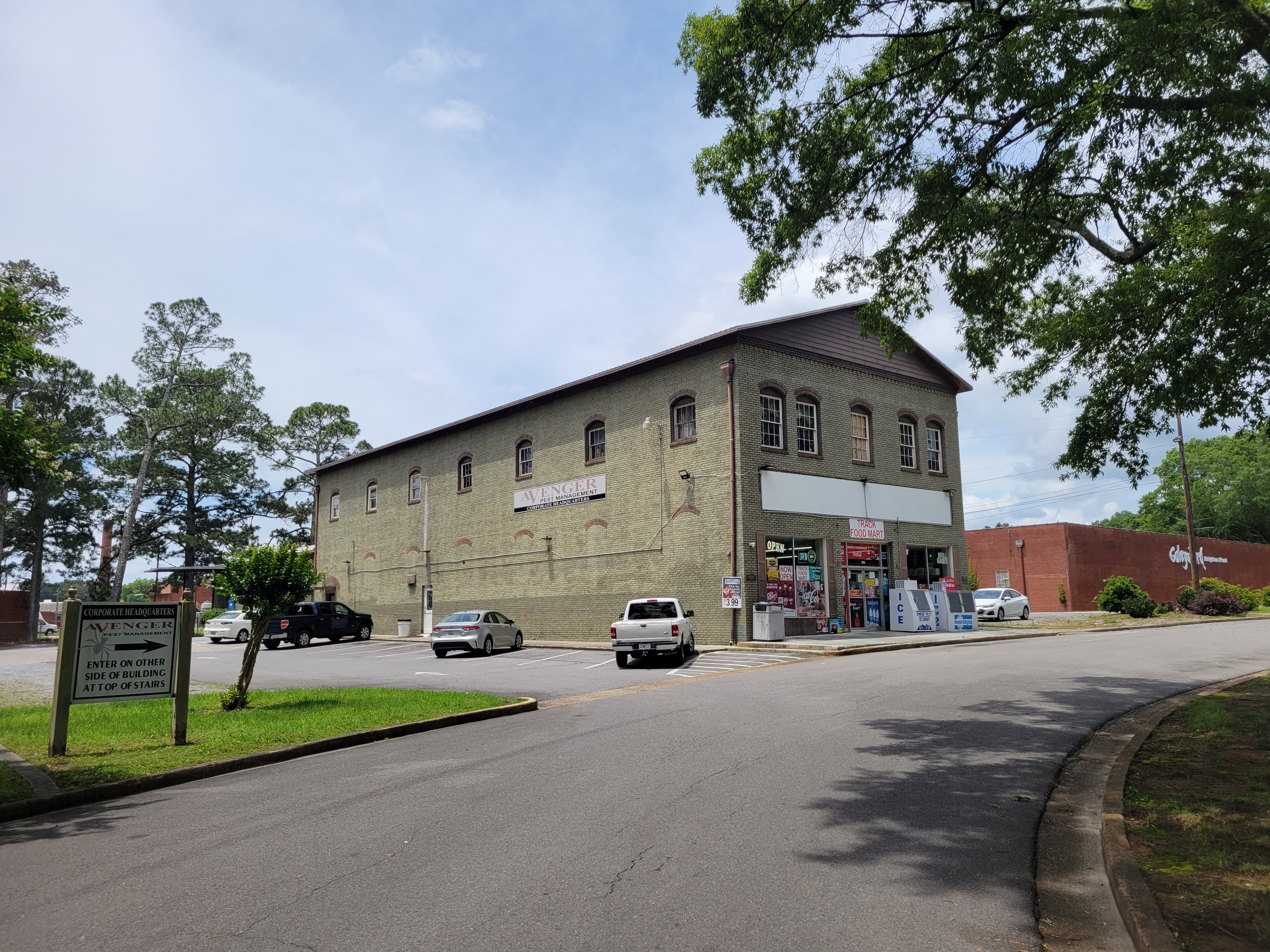
- Former McGowan Jones Pharmacy

- Location in Floyd County and the state of Georgia
- Coordinates: 34°20′30″N 85°4′47″W
- Country: United States
- State: Georgia
- County: Floyd

Area
  - Total: 5.02 sq mi (13.01 km^{2})
  - Land: 4.98 sq mi (12.90 km^{2})
  - Water: 0.042 sq mi (0.11 km^{2})
- Elevation: 696 ft (212 m)

Population (2020)
  - Total: 1,919
  - Density: 385.3/sq mi (148.78/km^{2})
- Time zone: UTC-5 (Eastern (EST))
  - Summer (DST): UTC-4 (EDT)
- ZIP code: 30172
- Area codes: 706/762
- FIPS code: 13-69868
- GNIS feature ID: 0333013

Shannon is an unincorporated community and census-designated place (CDP) in Floyd County, Georgia, United States. It is part of the Rome, Georgia Metropolitan Statistical Area. As of the 2020 census, Shannon had a population of 1,919.

== History ==
The first settlement at Shannon, first called Ridge Valley, then Hermitage, was made in the 1830s.

== Geography ==
Shannon is located in northeastern Floyd County between Rome and Calhoun, just off Highway 53. According to the U.S. Census Bureau, the Shannon CDP has a total area of 5.0 square miles (13.0 km^{2}), of which 5.0 square miles (12.9 km^{2}) is land and 0.04 square miles (0.1 km^{2}), or 0.86%, is water.

== Demographics ==
Historical population
Census	Pop.	Note	%±
1950	1,676		—
1960	1,629		−2.8%
1970	1,563		−4.1%
1980	2,040		30.5%
1990	1,514		−25.8%
2000	1,682		11.1%
2010	1,862		10.7%
2020	1,919		3.1%
U.S. Decennial Census; 1850-1870 1870-1880; 1890-1910 1920-1930; 1940 1950 1960; 1970 1980 1990; 2000 2010 2020

Shannan first appeared as an unincorporated place in the 1950 U.S. census; and designated a census designated place in the 1980 United States census.

=== Racial and ethnic composition ===
Shannon CDP, Georgia – racial and ethnic composition Note: the US Census treats Hispanic/Latino as an ethnic category. This table excludes Latinos from the racial categories and assigns them to a separate category. Hispanics/Latinos may be of any race.
Race / ethnicity (NH = Non-Hispanic)	Pop 2000	Pop 2010	Pop 2020	% 2000	% 2010	% 2020
White alone (NH)	1,588	1,756	1,700	94.41%	94.31%	88.59%
Black or African American alone (NH)	20	25	59	1.19%	1.34%	3.07%
Native American or Alaska Native alone (NH)	2	3	1	0.12%	0.16%	0.05%
Asian alone (NH)	5	11	5	0.30%	0.59%	0.26%
Pacific Islander alone (NH)	0	1	0	0.00%	0.05%	0.00%
Other race alone (NH)	1	2	3	0.06%	0.11%	0.16%
Mixed-race or multiracial (NH)	45	21	76	2.68%	1.13%	3.96%
Hispanic or Latino (any race)	21	43	75	1.25%	2.31%	3.91%
Total	1,682	1,862	1,919	100.00%	100.00%	100.00%

=== 2020 census ===
As of the 2020 census, Shannon had a population of 1,919. The median age was 43.8 years. 20.4% of residents were under the age of 18 and 20.5% were 65 years of age or older. For every 100 females, there were 99.3 males, and for every 100 females age 18 and over there were 100.4 males.

0.0% of residents lived in urban areas, while 100.0% lived in rural areas.

There were 839 households in Shannon, including 546 families. Of all households, 25.3% had children under the age of 18 living in them. 46.4% were married-couple households, 22.2% were households with a male householder and no spouse or partner present, and 26.1% were households with a female householder and no spouse or partner present. About 32.0% of all households were made up of individuals, and 11.5% had someone living alone who was 65 years of age or older.

There were 912 housing units, of which 8.0% were vacant. The homeowner vacancy rate was 0.8% and the rental vacancy rate was 4.3%.

=== 2000 census ===
As of the census of 2000, there were 1,682 people, 678 households, and 494 families residing in the CDP. The population density was 335.2 inhabitants per square mile (129.4/km^{2}). There were 723 housing units at an average density of 144.1 per square mile (55.6/km^{2}). The racial makeup of the CDP was 95.24% White, 1.19% African American, 0.12% Native American, 0.30% Asian, 0.48% from other races, and 2.68% from two or more races. Hispanic or Latino people of any race were 1.25% of the population.

There were 678 households, out of which 29.8% had children under the age of 18 living with them, 57.7% were married couples living together, 11.2% had a female householder with no husband present, and 27.0% were non-families. 22.6% of all households were made up of individuals, and 12.4% had someone living alone who was 65 years of age or older. The average household size was 2.48 and the average family size was 2.91.

In the CDP, the population was spread out, with 23.4% under the age of 18, 7.7% from 18 to 24, 27.8% from 25 to 44, 24.3% from 45 to 64, and 16.8% who were 65 years of age or older. The median age was 39 years. For every 100 females, there were 93.3 males. For every 100 females age 18 and over, there were 89.6 males.

The median income for a household in the CDP was $41,144, and the median income for a family was $42,578. Males had a median income of $30,181 versus $22,000 for females. The per capita income for the CDP was $17,565. About 6.4% of families and 5.8% of the population were below the poverty line, including 6.3% of those under age 18 and 16.9% of those age 65 or over.

== Climate ==
The climate in this area is characterized by relatively high temperatures and evenly distributed precipitation throughout the year. According to the Köppen Climate Classification system, Shannon has a humid subtropical climate, abbreviated "Cfa" on climate maps.

Climate data for Shannon, Georgia
Month	Jan	Feb	Mar	Apr	May	Jun	Jul	Aug	Sep	Oct	Nov	Dec	Year
Mean daily maximum °C (°F)	11 (51)	13 (56)	17 (63)	23 (74)	27 (81)	31 (88)	32 (90)	32 (90)	29 (84)	23 (74)	17 (62)	12 (54)	22 (72)
Mean daily minimum °C (°F)	−1 (30)	−1 (31)	3 (38)	8 (46)	13 (55)	17 (63)	19 (67)	19 (66)	16 (60)	8 (47)	2 (36)	−1 (31)	9 (48)
Average precipitation cm (inches)	13 (5)	11 (4.5)	17 (6.7)	13 (5)	11 (4.3)	9.4 (3.7)	12 (4.7)	8.9 (3.5)	11 (4.4)	7.1 (2.8)	9.9 (3.9)	12 (4.9)	135 (53.3)
Source: Weatherbase

== Education ==
Shannon is in the Floyd County School District. The zoned secondary schools are Model Middle School and Model High School.

== Notable people ==
- Hal Griggs, baseball player
