= Mike Glenn =

American basketball player

Personal information
- Born: September 10, 1955 (age 71) Rome, Georgia, U.S.
- Listed height: 6 ft 2 in (1.88 m)
- Listed weight: 175 lb (79 kg)

Career information
- High school: Coosa (Rome, Georgia)
- College: Southern Illinois (1973–1977)
- NBA draft: 1977: 2nd round, 23rd overall pick
- Drafted by: Chicago Bulls
- Playing career: 1977–1986
- Position: Point guard
- Number: 14, 34, 10

Career history
- 1977–1978: Buffalo Braves
- 1978–1981: New York Knicks
- 1981–1985: Atlanta Hawks
- 1985–1986: Milwaukee Bucks

Career highlights
- MVC Player of the Year (1976); 2× First-team All-MVC (1976, 1977)

Career NBA statistics
- Points: 4,496 (7.6 ppg)
- Rebounds: 710 (1.2 rpg)
- Assists: 952 (1.6 apg)
- Stats at NBA.com
- Stats at Basketball Reference

Michael Theodore "Stinger" Glenn (born September 10, 1955) is an American former professional basketball player.

== College career ==
He attended Coosa High School. Moving on to Southern Illinois University, Glenn was an All-Missouri Valley Conference college basketball player, graduating with honors and a B.S. degree in mathematics (minoring in computer science) in 1977.

== Professional career ==
He would go on to play ten seasons (1977–1987) in the National Basketball Association as a member of the Buffalo Braves, New York Knicks, Atlanta Hawks, and Milwaukee Bucks.

Drafted twenty-third overall by the Chicago Bulls in 1977, Glenn broke his neck in an offseason auto accident and was released from the team. He battled back to make a quick recovery, though, starting his NBA career later that same year with the Buffalo Braves. In 1978, Glenn signed with the New York Knicks; during his time in New York City, Glenn attended graduate business classes at St. John's University and Baruch College, earning his stockbroker's license. Over the course on his NBA career, Glenn averaged 7.6 points per game while shooting 54.2% from the field. He was noted for his smooth midrange jump shot, which not only contributed to his high shooting percentage (an amazing mark for a 6'3" guard), but also earned him the nickname "The Stinger" early in his career from his Knicks teammates. In 1981, Glenn received the J. Walter Kennedy Citizenship Award for community service.

== NBA career statistics ==
Legend
GP	Games played	GS	Games started	MPG	Minutes per game
FG%	Field goal percentage	3P%	3-point field goal percentage	FT%	Free throw percentage
RPG	Rebounds per game	APG	Assists per game	SPG	Steals per game
BPG	Blocks per game	PPG	Points per game	**Bold**	Career high

=== Regular season ===
Year	Team	GP	GS	MPG	FG%	3P%	FT%	RPG	APG	SPG	BPG	PPG
1977–78	Buffalo	56	-	16.9	.527	-	.785	1.4	1.4	0.6	**0.1**	7.9
1978–79	New York	75	-	15.6	.541	-	.905	1.1	1.8	0.5	**0.1**	7.8
1979–80	New York	75	-	10.7	.516	.200	.863	0.9	1.1	0.5	**0.1**	5.9
1980–81	New York	**82**	-	18.4	.558	.364	.891	1.1	1.3	**0.9**	**0.1**	8.2
1981–82	Atlanta	49	0	17.0	.543	**.500**	.881	1.2	1.8	0.5	**0.1**	7.7
1982–83	Atlanta	73	4	15.4	.518	.000	.831	1.2	1.7	0.4	**0.1**	7.3
1983–84	Atlanta	81	0	18.6	.563	**.500**	.800	1.3	**2.1**	0.6	**0.1**	8.4
1984–85	Atlanta	60	**5**	**18.8**	**.588**	.000	.816	1.4	2.0	0.5	0.0	**8.6**
1985–86	Milwaukee	38	1	15.1	.495	.000	**.959**	**1.5**	1.0	0.2	**0.1**	6.2
1986–87	Milwaukee	4	0	8.5	.385	.000	.714	0.5	0.3	0.3	0.0	3.8
Career		593	10	16.2	.542	.286	.855	1.2	1.6	0.5	0.1	7.6

=== Playoffs ===
Year	Team	GP	GS	MPG	FG%	3P%	FT%	RPG	APG	SPG	BPG	PPG
1980–81	New York	2	-	13.0	.571	.000	**1.000**	**2.0**	0.5	0.5	0.0	5.5
1981–82	Atlanta	2	-	17.5	**.714**	.000	**1.000**	0.5	**1.0**	**1.5**	0.0	6.0
1982–83	Atlanta	3	-	**22.3**	.545	.000	**1.000**	1.7	**1.0**	0.7	0.0	**9.3**
1983–84	Atlanta	5	-	10.6	.357	.000	.000	1.0	**1.0**	0.4	0.0	2.0
1985–86	Milwaukee	**10**	0	11.4	.361	.000	.833	1.1	0.8	0.1	0.0	3.6
Career		22	0	13.4	.453	.000	.905	1.2	0.9	0.4	0.0	4.4

== Post-retirement ==
Since retiring as a basketball player, Glenn has worked as a television analyst, writer, and commissioner of the World Basketball Association. Because of his business background, Glenn was also employed in the early 1990s by Merrill Lynch as a consultant for the NBA's pre-pension plan. He currently runs the Mike Glenn All-Star Basketball Camp for the Hearing-Impaired, which is the nation's first basketball camp for deaf athletes and is offered every summer, free of charge, to as many as 120 deaf athletes from across the country. He worked as the Atlanta Hawks' color commentator on SportSouth and FSN from 1992 to 2005, and now serves as the Hawks' pregame and postgame analyst on FSN South.

In addition to his basketball-related work, Glenn is also an avid collector of artifacts pertaining to African-American history. He maintains a large personal library on the subject, and has displayed his collection in exhibits across the country. Using sources from his library, Glenn has written several biographical books on famous African-Americans.
