= Silver Creek (Georgia) =

Stream in Floyd and Polk County, Georgia, U.S.

Coordinates: 34°14′48″N 85°10′32″W

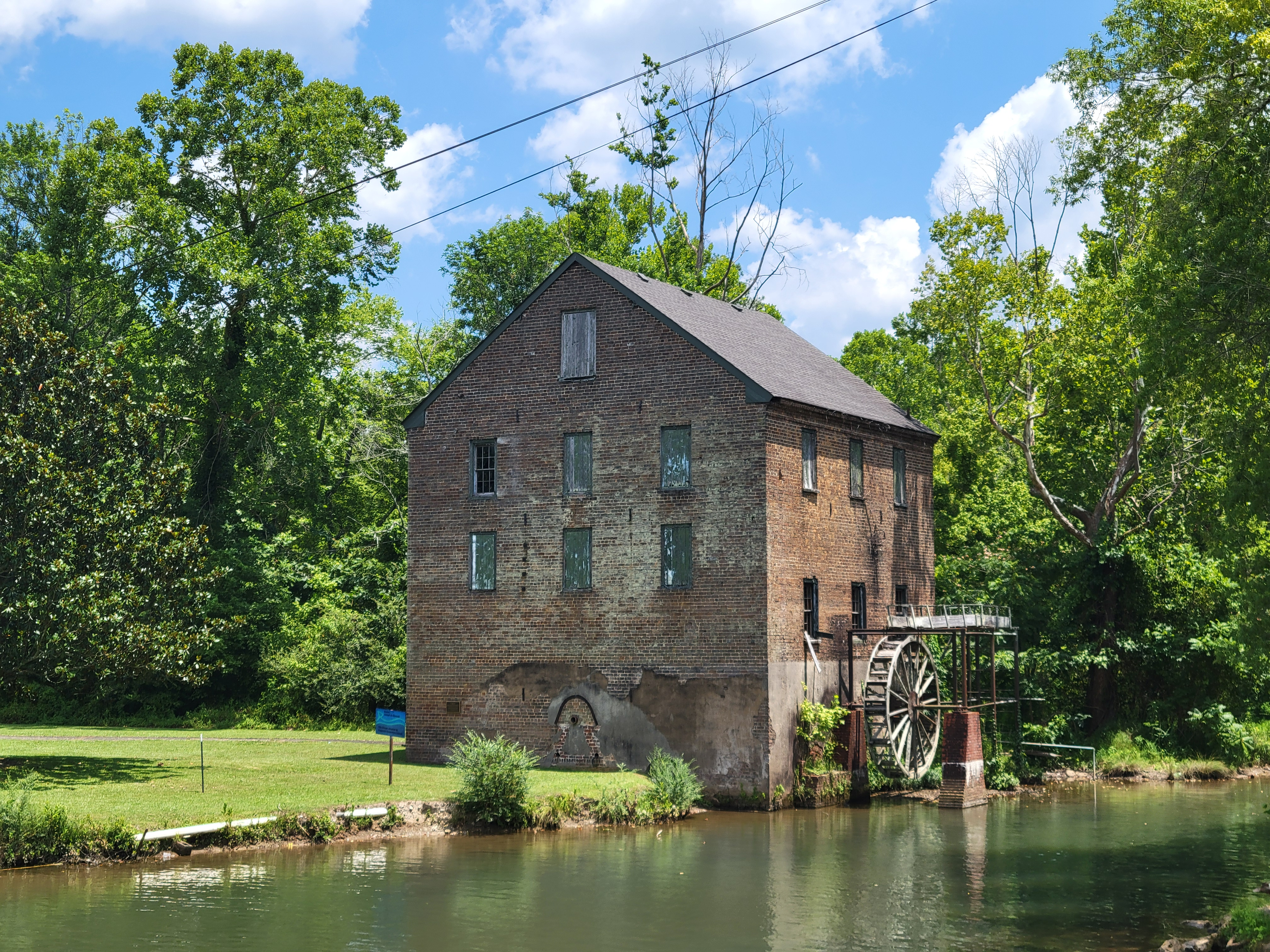
Old Brick Mill in Lindale, Georgia

Silver Creek is a stream in Floyd County and Polk County, Georgia, in the United States.

Silver Creek was so named on account of the silver mining in the area. The stream lends its name to the community of Silver Creek, Georgia.

== See also ==
- List of rivers of Georgia (U.S. state)
