= Merrick County, Nebraska =

County in Nebraska, United States

Coordinates: 41.17°N 98.03°W

Merrick County
- County
- County of Merrick
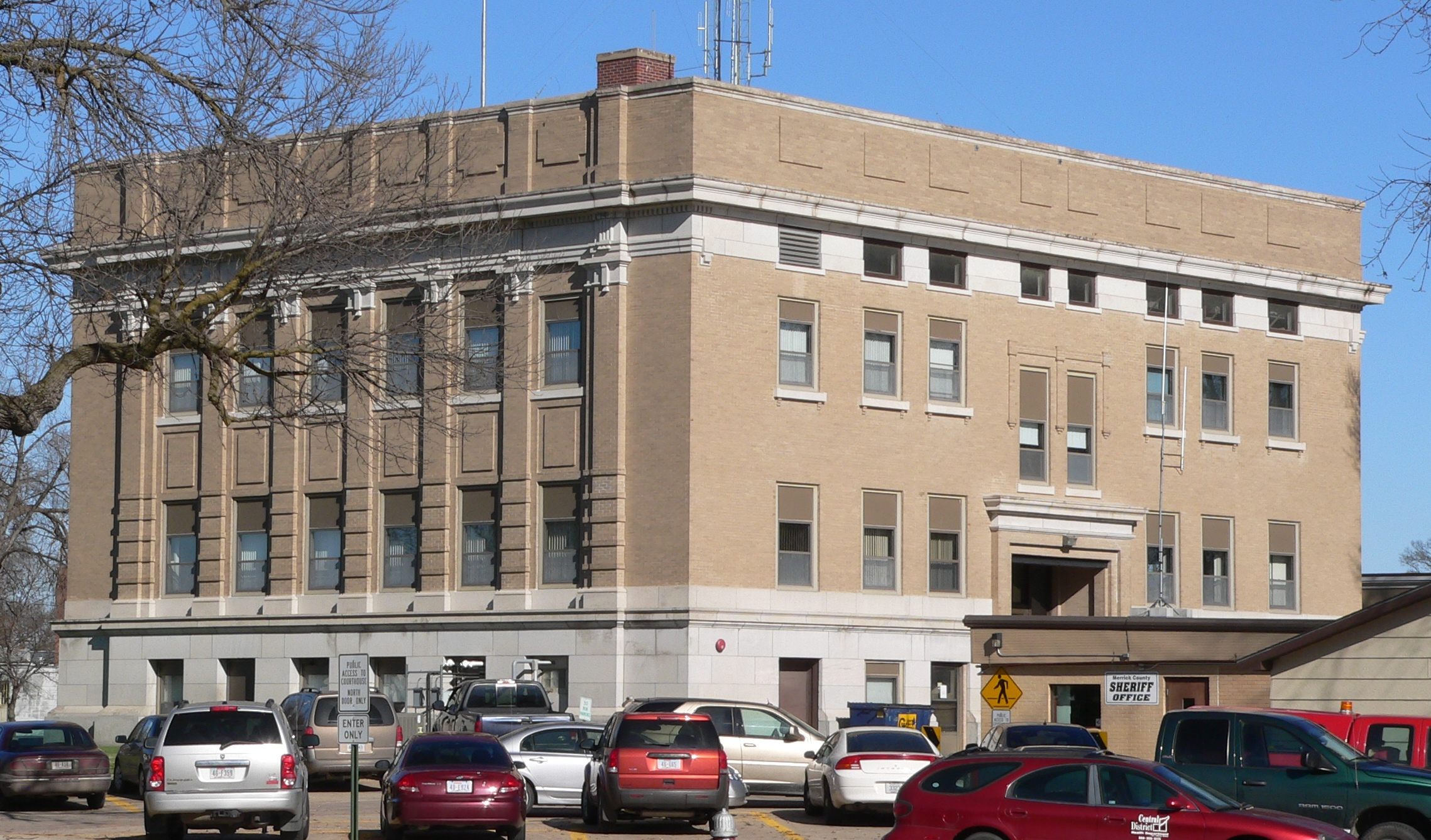
- Merrick County Courthouse in Central City

- Location within the U.S. state of Nebraska
- Interactive map of Merrick County
- Country: United States
- State: Nebraska
- Established: November 4, 1858
- Organized: April 18, 1864
- Named for: Elvira Merrick
- County seat: Central City
- Largest city: Central City

Area
  - Total: 494 sq mi (1,280 km^{2})
  - Land: 485 sq mi (1,260 km^{2})
  - Water: 9.6 sq mi (25 km^{2}) 1.9%
- Highest elevation: 1,880 ft (570 m)
- Lowest elevation: 1,345 ft (410 m)

Population (2020)
  - Total: 7,668
  - Estimate (2025): 7,905 ▲
  - Density: 16.3/sq mi (6.3/km^{2})
- Time zone: UTC−6 (Central)
  - Summer (DST): UTC−5 (CDT)
- Area code: 308
- FIPS code: 31121
- GNIS feature ID: 835882
- Website: merrickcounty.ne.gov

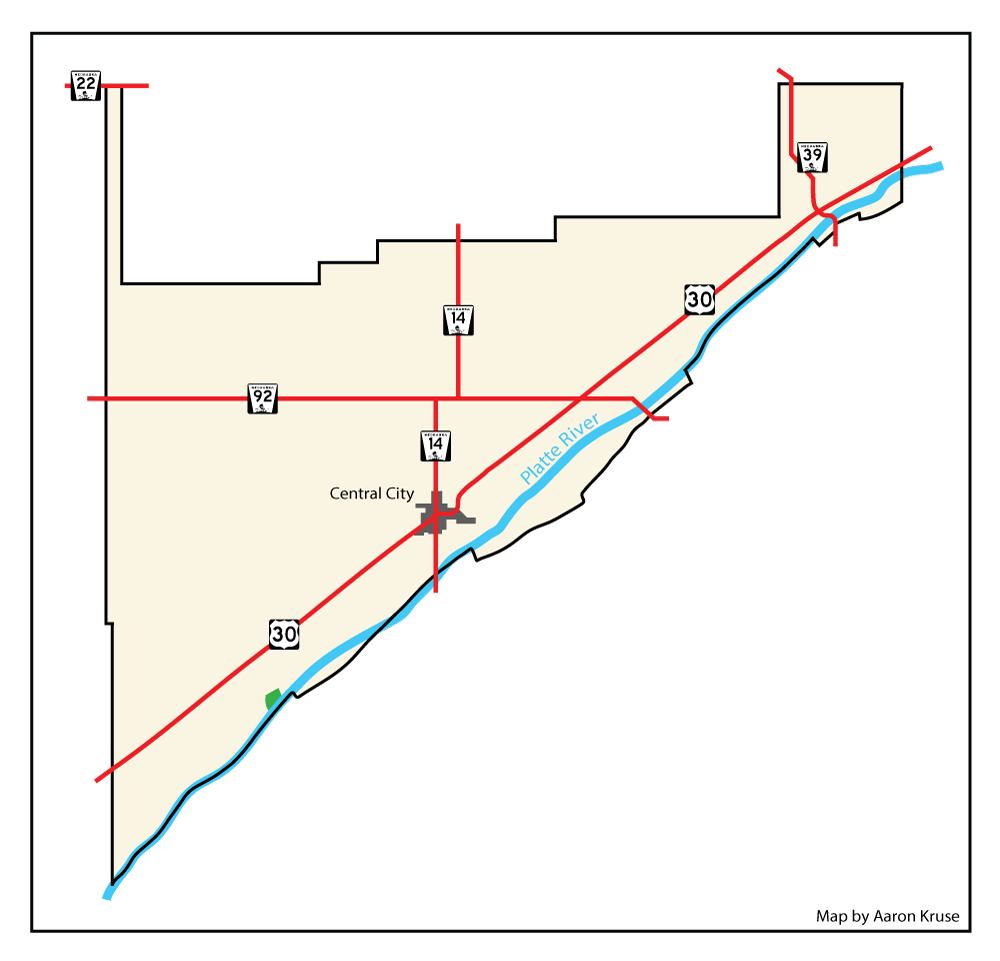
A map of Merrick County, Nebraska

Merrick County is a county in the U.S. state of Nebraska. As of the 2020 United States census, the population was 7,668. Its county seat is Central City.

Merrick County is part of the Grand Island metropolitan area.

== History ==
Merrick County was formed in 1858, and was organized in 1864. It was named for Elvira Merrick, the maiden name of the wife of territorial legislator Henry W. DePuy, who introduced the bill that created the county.

When first formed, the county was bounded on the south by the Platte River, and by straight lines on the north, east, and west; enclosing 180 square miles (470 km^{2}) of the Pawnee Reservation, which had been established in 1857. In 1873, the state legislature removed these reservation lands from the county, leaving it with a jagged northern border from which narrow panhandles extended northward from the northeast and northwest corners. In 1897, the Pawnee Reservation became Nance County.

== Geography ==
The terrain of Merrick County is low rolling plains, sloping to the east and northeast. Most of the area is under cultivation. The Platte River flows northeastward along the southeast border line of the county. A smaller drainage, Prairie Creek, parallels the river, flowing northeastward through the center of the county before discharging into the Platte River northeast of Merrick County. The county has an area of 494 square miles (1,280 km^{2}), of which 485 square miles (1,260 km^{2}) is land and 9.6 square miles (25 km^{2}) (1.9%) is water.

=== Major highways ===
- U.S. Highway 30
- Nebraska Highway 14
- Nebraska Highway 22
- Nebraska Highway 39
- Nebraska Highway 92

=== Adjacent counties ===
- Platte County – northeast
- Polk County – east
- Hamilton County – south
- Hall County – southwest
- Howard County – west
- Nance County – north

== Demographics ==
Historical population
Census	Pop.	Note	%±
1860	109		—
1870	557		411.0%
1880	5,341		858.9%
1890	8,758		64.0%
1900	9,255		5.7%
1910	10,379		12.1%
1920	10,763		3.7%
1930	10,619		−1.3%
1940	9,354		−11.9%
1950	8,812		−5.8%
1960	8,363		−5.1%
1970	8,751		4.6%
1980	8,945		2.2%
1990	8,049		−10.0%
2000	8,204		1.9%
2010	7,845		−4.4%
2020	7,668		−2.3%
2025 (est.)	7,905	▲	3.1%
US Decennial Census; 1790-1960 1900-1990; 1990-2000 2010-2013

=== 2020 census ===
As of the 2020 census, the county had a population of 7,668. The median age was 42.8 years. 24.0% of residents were under the age of 18 and 21.2% of residents were 65 years of age or older. For every 100 females there were 103.5 males, and for every 100 females age 18 and over there were 102.1 males age 18 and over.

The racial makeup of the county was 91.9% White, 0.6% Black or African American, 0.5% American Indian and Alaska Native, 0.4% Asian, 0.1% Native Hawaiian and Pacific Islander, 2.0% from some other race, and 4.5% from two or more races. Hispanic or Latino residents of any race comprised 4.9% of the population.

0.0% of residents lived in urban areas, while 100.0% lived in rural areas.

There were 3,072 households in the county, of which 28.1% had children under the age of 18 living with them and 18.8% had a female householder with no spouse or partner present. About 26.9% of all households were made up of individuals and 13.3% had someone living alone who was 65 years of age or older.

There were 3,548 housing units, of which 13.4% were vacant. Among occupied housing units, 76.6% were owner-occupied and 23.4% were renter-occupied. The homeowner vacancy rate was 2.0% and the rental vacancy rate was 7.2%.

=== 2000 census ===
As of the 2000 United States census, there were 8,204 people, 3,209 households, and 2,307 families in the county. The population density was 17 people per square mile (6.6 people/km^{2}). There were 3,649 housing units at an average density of 8 units per square mile (3.1 units/km^{2}).

The racial makeup of the county was 98.32% White, 0.22% Black or African American, 0.10% Native American, 0.21% Asian, 0.01% Pacific Islander, 0.67% from other races, and 0.48% from two or more races. 2.05% of the population were Hispanic or Latino of any race.

There were 3,209 households, out of which 33.30% had children under the age of 18 living with them, 61.10% were married couples living together, 6.50% had a female householder with no husband present, and 28.10% were non-families. 25.00% of all households were made up of individuals, and 13.10% had someone living alone who was 65 years of age or older. The average household size was 2.51 and the average family size was 2.99.

The county population contained 27.50% under the age of 18, 6.40% from 18 to 24, 24.70% from 25 to 44, 23.80% from 45 to 64, and 17.50% who were 65 years of age or older. The median age was 39 years. For every 100 females, there were 95.90 males. For every 100 females age 18 and over, there were 94.90 males.

The median income for a household in the county was $34,961, and the median income for a family was $39,729. Males had a median income of $26,998 versus $19,828 for females. The per capita income for the county was $15,958. About 7.00% of families and 8.90% of the population were below the poverty line, including 9.70% of those under age 18 and 9.20% of those age 65 or over.

== Communities ==
=== City ===
- Central City (county seat)

=== Villages ===
- Chapman
- Clarks
- Palmer
- Silver Creek

=== Census-designated place ===
- Archer

=== Unincorporated communities ===
- Havens
- Lockwood
- Paddock
- Worms

=== Townships ===
- Central
- Chapman
- Clarksville
- Lone Tree
- Loup
- Mead
- Midland
- Prairie Creek
- Prairie Island
- Silver Creek
- Vieregg

== Politics ==
Merrick County voters have been strongly Republican for decades. In no national election since 1936 has the county selected the Democratic Party candidate (as of 2024).

United States presidential election results for Merrick County, Nebraska
Year	Republican		Democratic		Third party(ies)	
Year	No.	%	No.	%	No.	%
1900	1,212	52.29%	996	42.97%	110	4.75%
1904	1,275	61.09%	400	19.17%	412	19.74%
1908	1,133	46.92%	1,081	44.76%	201	8.32%
1912	526	22.66%	950	40.93%	845	36.41%
1916	1,178	44.82%	1,349	51.33%	101	3.84%
1920	2,385	65.11%	1,075	29.35%	203	5.54%
1924	2,324	54.34%	1,137	26.58%	816	19.08%
1928	3,269	69.57%	1,403	29.86%	27	0.57%
1932	1,698	36.16%	2,881	61.35%	117	2.49%
1936	2,367	48.43%	2,401	49.13%	119	2.44%
1940	2,886	66.31%	1,466	33.69%	0	0.00%
1944	2,691	65.94%	1,390	34.06%	0	0.00%
1948	2,074	62.08%	1,267	37.92%	0	0.00%
1952	3,288	77.31%	965	22.69%	0	0.00%
1956	2,857	71.73%	1,126	28.27%	0	0.00%
1960	2,744	68.98%	1,234	31.02%	0	0.00%
1964	1,798	50.81%	1,741	49.19%	0	0.00%
1968	2,031	65.88%	840	27.25%	212	6.88%
1972	2,418	73.16%	887	26.84%	0	0.00%
1976	2,229	60.21%	1,360	36.74%	113	3.05%
1980	2,710	73.36%	712	19.27%	272	7.36%
1984	2,700	76.14%	818	23.07%	28	0.79%
1988	2,376	66.15%	1,192	33.18%	24	0.67%
1992	1,854	48.65%	864	22.67%	1,093	28.68%
1996	2,084	58.67%	997	28.07%	471	13.26%
2000	2,380	71.26%	848	25.39%	112	3.35%
2004	2,771	75.77%	833	22.78%	53	1.45%
2008	2,375	69.22%	986	28.74%	70	2.04%
2012	2,490	71.37%	925	26.51%	74	2.12%
2016	2,926	77.24%	602	15.89%	260	6.86%
2020	3,419	79.85%	743	17.35%	120	2.80%
2024	3,551	81.30%	730	16.71%	87	1.99%

== See also ==
- National Register of Historic Places listings in Merrick County, Nebraska
