= Chris Jones (punter) =

American football player (born 1989)

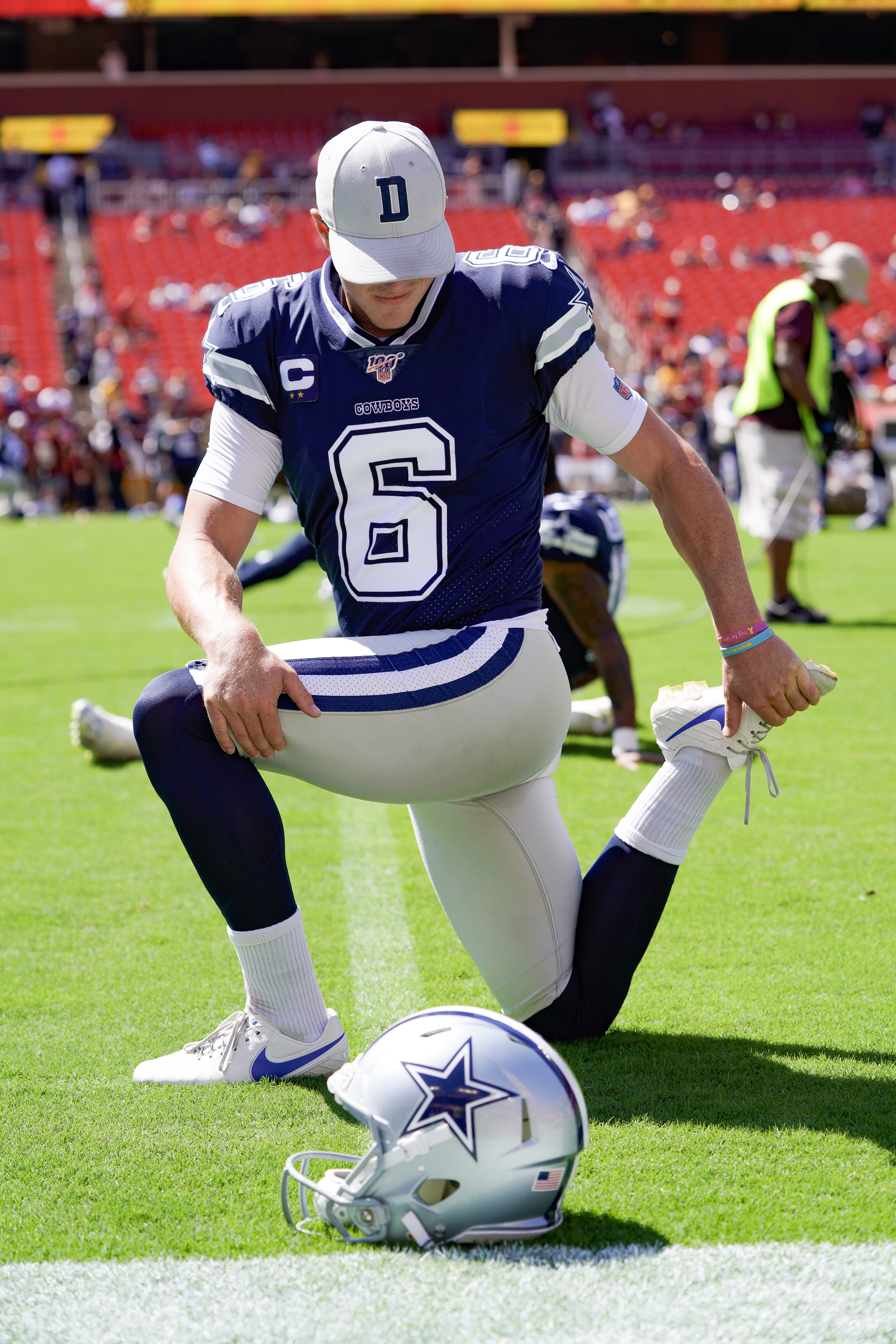
- Jones with the Dallas Cowboys in 2019

No. 6
- Position: Punter

Personal information
- Born: July 21, 1989 (age 37); Rome, Georgia, U.S.
- Listed height: 6 ft 0 in (1.83 m)
- Listed weight: 205 lb (93 kg)

Career information
- High school: Coosa (Rome, Georgia)
- College: Carson–Newman
- NFL draft: 2011: undrafted

Career history
- Dallas Cowboys (2011–2020)

Awards and highlights
- 2× All-SAC (2007, 2010); 2× Second-team All-SAC (2008, 2009)

Career NFL statistics
- Games played: 126
- Punts: 483
- Punting yards: 21,475
- Average punt: 44.5
- Longest punt: 66
- Inside 20: 187
- Stats at Pro Football Reference

Chris Jones (born July 21, 1989) is an American former professional football player who was a punter in the National Football League (NFL) for 10 seasons with the Dallas Cowboys. He played college football for the Carson–Newman Eagles before signing with the Cowboys as an undrafted free agent in 2011.

== Early life ==
Jones attended Coosa High School, where he was an All-area punter as a senior. Jones is a left-footed kicker and right-handed passer. He also practiced track and field.

Jones accepted a football scholarship from Carson-Newman College, where he was a four-time starter and All-SAC performer.

As a freshman in 2007, Jones led the SAC with a 41.4-yard average on 34 punts and landed six inside the 20-yard-line, with a long punt of 64 yards.

As a sophomore in 2008, Jones averaged 38.5 yards on 41 punts and landed six punts inside the 20-yard-line, with a long punt of 57 yards.

As a junior in 2009, Jones appeared in all 14 games, ranking third in the conference in punting with 39.3 yards-per-punt average. He landed eight punts inside the 20-yard line, forced 21 fair catches on 54 attempts and had a season-long punt of 55 yards against the University of North Carolina at Pembroke.

As a senior in 2010, Jones was second in the league with a 42.1-yard average, had a long punt of 73 yards (school record) against Winona State University, landed 15 punts inside the 20-yard-line and had nine punts of at least 50 yards. For his career, Jones averaged 40.3 yards per punt, landed 46 punts inside the 20-yard-line and made 20 punts of at least 50 yards.

== Professional career ==
Pre-draft measurables
Height	Weight	40-yard dash	10-yard split	20-yard split	Vertical jump	Broad jump
5 ft 11 7/8 in (1.83 m)	200 lb (91 kg)	4.68 s	1.70 s	2.72 s	30.0 in (0.76 m)	9 ft 0 in (2.74 m)
All values from Pro Day

=== 2011 season ===
Jones was signed as an undrafted free agent by the Dallas Cowboys after the 2011 NFL draft on July 28. He was released before the season started on September 3, but was signed to the practice squad on October 28. Eight days later, Jones was promoted to the active roster, filling in for an injured Mat McBriar in one game against the Seattle Seahawks.

Jones was released on November 15 and was signed to the practice squad two days later. On December 31, he was promoted to the active roster. Jones punted in the season finale against the New York Giants in place of an injured McBriar, making six punts, a 42.3 gross average, a 38.8 net average, two punts downed inside the 20-yard line, and a long of 54 yards.

=== 2012 season ===
In 2012, the Cowboys decided not to re-sign McBriar and Jones entered the season as the starter at punter. He suffered a left knee injury on September 23, against the Tampa Bay Buccaneers, when Jones nearly had a punt blocked.

On October 14, a practice injury to punter Brian Moorman forced him to play against the Baltimore Ravens with a partially torn ACL he was still rehabbing. Jones was placed on the injured reserve list 10 days later. He punted 12 times with a gross average of 45.2 yards, a net average of 40 yards and downed six punts inside the 20-yard-line.

=== 2013 season ===
On August 24, 2013, during a preseason game against the Cincinnati Bengals, Jones became the second player (first Cowboys player) to hit the Cowboys Stadium high definition "jumbotron" scoreboard. He regained his starting job and in his first full season, Jones finished with a 45-yard gross average, a 39.1-yard net average, 30 punts inside the 20-yard-line (third in team history) and a long of 62 yards.

=== 2014 season ===
On March 10, 2014, Jones signed his exclusive rights tender of $645,000. He had a 45.4-yard per punt average with 21 downed inside the 20-yard line and a 39.8-yard net average and a long of 64 yards.

In the Wild Card Playoff Game against the Detroit Lions, Jones punted four times for a gross of 48.0 (second in team postseason history), a net of 47.5 (record in team postseason history) and three downed inside the 20. He contributed to the Cowboys limiting the Lions returners to just 10 yards - one punt for two yards and one kickoff for eight yards.

=== 2015 season ===
In 2015, Jones ranked third in the league with a career-best 42.5 net average, though the Cowboys required him to directional punt. He tied for fifth with 22 fair catches and tied for fourteenth with 27 punts inside the 20-yard-line.

On December 7 against the Washington Redskins, Jones became the first punter in franchise history to recover a fumble during the return of one of his own punts. He finished second in the NFC and third in the NFL with a career-best 42.5 punt net average, while downing 27 punts inside the 20-yard-line.

=== 2016 season ===
In the seventh game against the Philadelphia Eagles, facing 4th-and-8 on the Cowboys 27-yard line, Jones had a 30-yard run on a fake punt that contributed to the eventual 29-23 overtime victory and was the fourth-longest run by a punter in league history.

On December 26, 2016, in a Monday Night Football game against the Detroit Lions, Jones garnered attention from social media for a big hit on Lion's returner Andre Roberts during a fourth-quarter punt return. Roberts received the punt at the Lions 47 yard line. As Roberts broke the return down the left sideline, Cowboys linebacker Kyle Wilber had the angle on him. At the 30-yard line, Wilber dove toward Roberts where Jones met them both - lowering his shoulder and delivering a blow on Roberts that took the returner off his feet. In the season finale, Jones had a 66-yarder punt that bounced out of bounds at the Philadelphia Eagles' 1-yard line.

Jones established a career-high with a 45.9-yard average, a career-long 66-yard punt, a 40.5-yard net average and 25 punts downed inside the 20-yard-line. He became the fifth punter in team history with at least 100 punts downed inside the 20-yard-line, landing 2 against the Baltimore Ravens. At the time, he had the all-time highest percentage of punts downed inside the 20-yard line (39.9%) in team history.

=== 2017 season ===
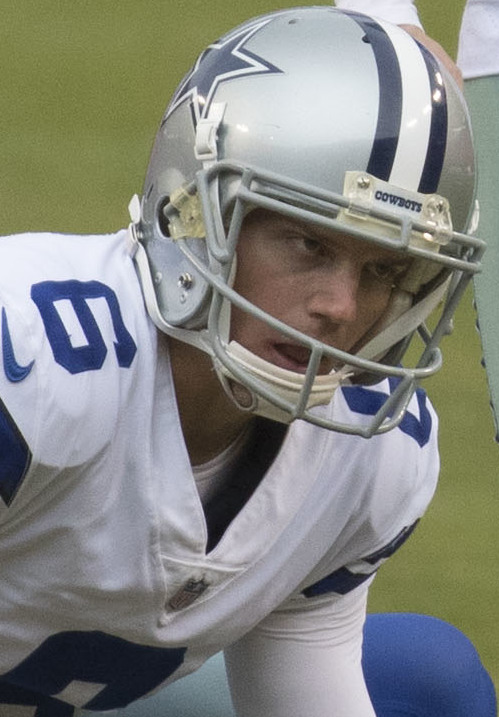
Jones in 2017

On August 9, 2017, Jones signed a four-year contract extension with the Cowboys.

During Week 15 against the Oakland Raiders, Jones called his own fake punt while facing 4th-and-11 on the Cowboys' 10-yard line, rushing for 24 yards and a first down, which contributed to the eventual 20–17 road victory.

Jones had a career-best 34 punts downed inside the 20-yard line (second in team history), while registering a 41.4-yard net and a 44.1-yard gross average. He contributed to limit opponents to 75 punt return yards on the year - the fewest allowed in the league since the Atlanta Falcons yielded 49 yards in 2008 and the second-fewest in team history (41 yards in 1972).

=== 2018 season ===
Jones averaged 44.5 yards-per-punt with two touchbacks. He downed 17 punts inside the 20-yard line and had a 39.6-yard net average. Jones became the third punter in club history with at least 150 career punts downed inside the 20-yard line. He played his 100th career game at Indianapolis on December 16.

=== 2019 season ===
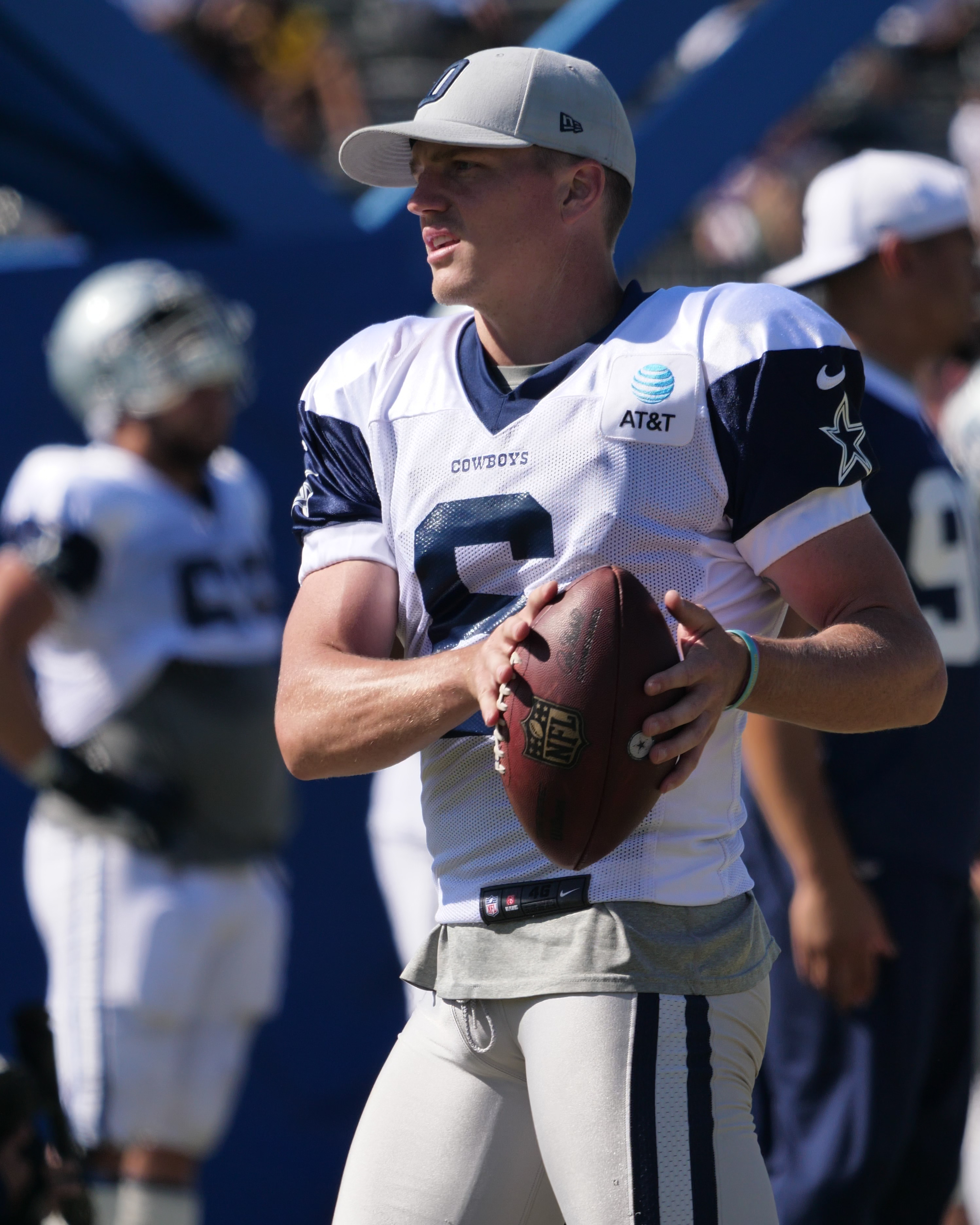
Jones in 2019

Jones suffered a significant decline in productivity, averaging 41.6 gross yards and a 37-yard net average per attempt. Both stats were the NFL's lowest. At the end of the season, it was reported in the media that he played through a back and sports hernia injury.

=== 2020 season ===
On November 7, 2020, Jones was placed on injured reserve after undergoing core muscle surgery. He was replaced with Hunter Niswander. Jones appeared in eight games, averaging 42.6 yards on 24 punts, the second-lowest season average in his career. He also had two kickoffs.

Jones was released on March 17, 2021.

== NFL career statistics ==
Legend
	Led the league
**Bold**	Career high

=== Regular season ===
Year	Team	Punting									
Year	Team	GP	Punts	Yds	Net Yds	Lng	Avg	Net Avg	Blk	Ins20	TB
2011	DAL	2	10	426	405	54	42.6	40.5	0	4	1
2012	DAL	4	12	542	520	60	45.2	40.0	**1**	6	0
2013	DAL	**16**	**77**	**3,467**	**3,008**	62	45.0	39.1	0	30	**6**
2014	DAL	**16**	57	2,586	2,306	64	45.4	39.8	**1**	21	2
2015	DAL	**16**	69	3,114	2,935	61	45.1	**42.5**	0	27	1
2016	DAL	**16**	58	2,661	2,389	**66**	**45.9**	40.5	**1**	25	4
2017	DAL	**16**	66	2,908	2,733	62	44.1	41.4	0	**34**	5
2018	DAL	**16**	60	2,670	2,376	63	44.5	39.6	0	17	2
2019	DAL	**16**	50	2,079	1,885	58	41.6	37.0	**1**	18	2
2020	DAL	8	24	1,022	965	54	42.6	40.2	0	5	1
Career		126	483	21,475	19,522	66	44.5	40.1	4	187	24

=== Postseason ===
Year	Team	Punting									
Year	Team	GP	Punts	Yds	Net Yds	Lng	Avg	Net Avg	Blk	Ins20	TB
2014	DAL	**2**	6	289	267	**60**	**48.2**	44.5	0	**3**	0
2016	DAL	1	2	95	95	53	47.5	**47.5**	0	1	0
2018	DAL	**2**	**9**	**390**	**339**	50	43.3	37.7	0	1	0
Career		5	17	774	701	60	45.5	41.2	0	5	0
