= Cave Spring, Georgia =

- City
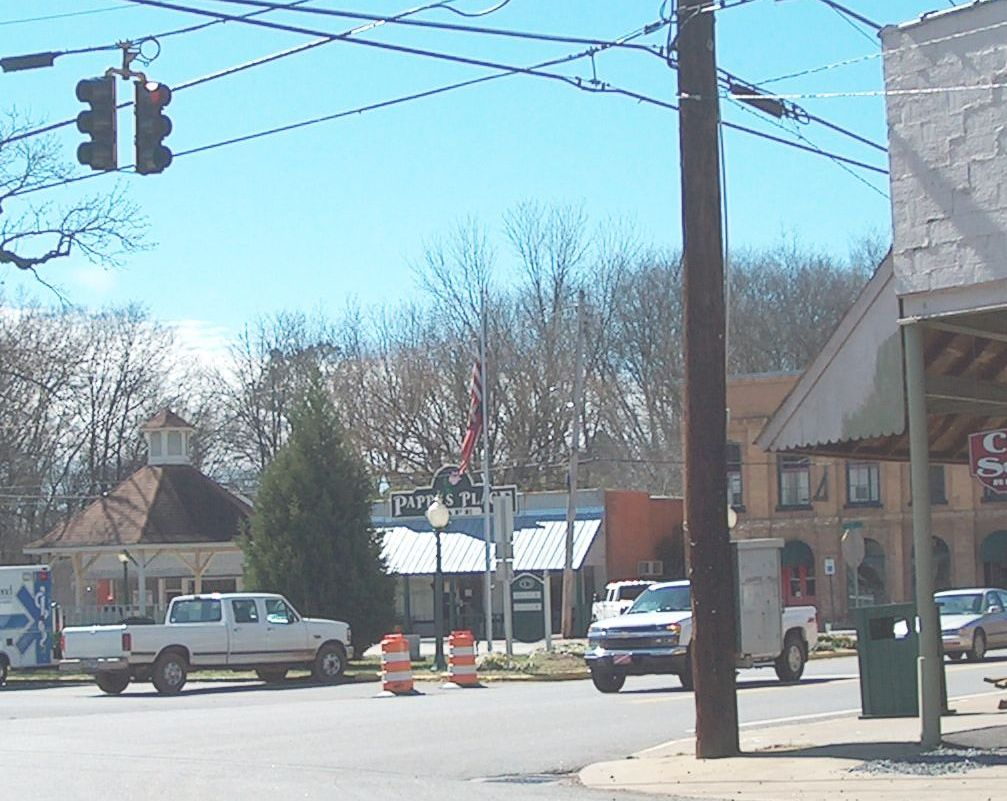
- Downtown Cave Spring

- Location in Floyd County and the state of Georgia
- Coordinates: 34°6′32″N 85°20′10″W
- Country: United States
- State: Georgia
- County: Floyd

Area
  - Total: 3.68 sq mi (9.54 km^{2})
  - Land: 3.67 sq mi (9.50 km^{2})
  - Water: 0.015 sq mi (0.04 km^{2})
- Elevation: 640 ft (195 m)

Population (2020)
  - Total: 1,174
  - Density: 320.1/sq mi (123.61/km^{2})
- Time zone: UTC-5 (Eastern (EST))
  - Summer (DST): UTC-4 (EDT)
- ZIP code: 30124
- Area codes: 706/762
- FIPS code: 13-14108
- GNIS feature ID: 0355041
- Website: cavespring.ga.gov

Cave Spring is a city in Floyd County, Georgia, United States. It is located 17 miles (27 km) southwest of Rome, the county seat. As of the 2020 census, Cave Spring had a population of 1,174. It is part of the Rome, Georgia, metropolitan area.

The town is named for its natural limestone cave and mineral spring site which serves as the main source of drinking water for nearby communities. The spring flows from the cave into a rock holding pond in Rolater Park and then into a 1.5-acre (6,100 m^{2}) swimming pool constructed of stones.

Spring water is piped to local homes and businesses by the public-utility service of Cave Spring. Visitors may also bring jugs to fill at the spring and take home for drinking.

== Geography ==
Cave Spring is located in southwestern Floyd County at 34°6′32″N 85°20′10″W (34.108912, -85.336018). U.S. Route 411 passes through the city, leading northeast 17 miles (27 km) to Rome and west 46 miles (74 km) to Gadsden, Alabama. The Alabama border is 5 miles (8 km) west of Cave Spring. Georgia State Route 100 leads north from Cave Spring 12 miles (19 km) to Coosa and southeast 11 miles (18 km) to Cedartown.

According to the United States Census Bureau, the city of Cave Spring has a total area of 4.1 square miles (10.5 km^{2}), of which 0.02 square miles (0.04 km^{2}), or 0.36%, is water.

== History ==
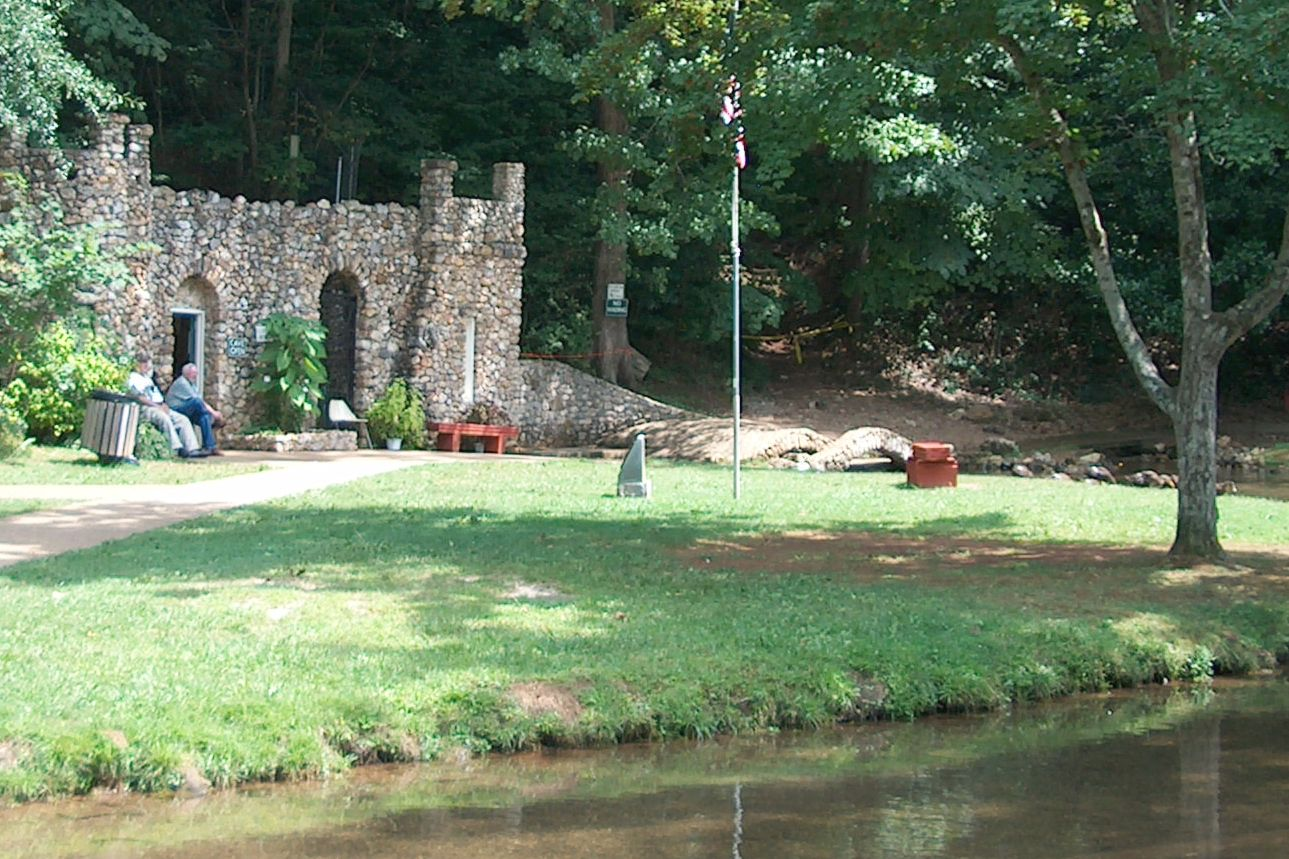
Rolater Park is known for its spring water and pre-Civil War cave.

The town of Cave Spring dates to 1832, but the community is much older. Historically, indigenous peoples of the area (both Cherokee and the earlier Mississippian culture) used the site for drinking water, tribal meetings, and games, according to legend.

The town was founded in 1832 by Baptists who were among its early settlers. It takes its name from a clear water spring which still serves as the main source of drinking water for Cave Spring and nearby communities. The water is now delivered by a modern pumping system and has won awards for purity and taste.

The spring flows from its source inside the cave into a small rock pool or open reservoir, separated from a larger duck pond. Both ponds are located just outside the cave entrance, which is fronted by a man-made rock wall. These improvements were added as part of Rolater Park, named in 1921.

The wall encloses a lobby leading to the natural cave entrance, which widens to a larger cavity. The cave features limestone formations; one, a large stalagmite, is named the Devil's Stool. There is also a manmade staircase inside the cave for those who want to view the formations from above.

The park site was formerly used by educational institutions such as Cave Spring Manual Labor School (renamed Hearn Academy) and others including Georgia School for the Deaf. During the Atlanta campaign of the Civil War in 1864, both Confederate and Union troops came to Cave Spring for hospitalization and rest.

Cave Spring has historic homes and buildings from its early years, such as the 1867 Presbyterian Church, 1880 train depot, and 19th century hotels and boarding houses.

== Government and infrastructure ==
=== Government structure ===
The government of Cave Spring operates under a mayor/council form of municipal government. This system is made up of five council members and the mayor, with council seats divided into five posts for election purposes. Both the mayor and council members serve four-year terms.

=== Elections ===
Elections occur biennially in odd-numbered years, and officials serve four-year terms without holding primaries. The selection of officials is based on plurality, where the candidate with the most votes is elected.

To run for office in Cave Spring:

- Candidates must be at least 21 years old.
- Candidates must have been residents of the city of Cave Spring for at least one year preceding the election.
- Candidates must be registered voters.
- A qualifying fee equivalent to 3% of the annual salary is required.

=== Infrastructure ===
Cave Spring's city hall is Fannin Hall, formerly part of the Georgia School for the Deaf. It was renovated and reopened in 2015.

== Demographics ==
Historical population
Census	Pop.	Note	%±
1880	835		—
1890	952		14.0%
1900	824		−13.4%
1910	805		−2.3%
1920	738		−8.3%
1930	723		−2.0%
1940	982		35.8%
1950	959		−2.3%
1960	1,153		20.2%
1970	1,305		13.2%
1980	883		−32.3%
1990	950		7.6%
2000	975		2.6%
2010	1,200		23.1%
2020	1,174		−2.2%
U.S. Decennial Census

=== 2020 census ===
Cave Spring racial composition
Race	Num.	Perc.
White (non-Hispanic)	970	82.62%
Black or African American (non-Hispanic)	122	10.39%
Native American	2	0.17%
Asian	8	0.68%
Pacific Islander	1	0.09%
Other/mixed	43	3.66%
Hispanic or Latino	28	2.39%

As of the 2020 census, Cave Spring had a population of 1,174. There were 260 families residing in the city.

The median age was 45.0 years. 23.1% of residents were under the age of 18 and 21.1% of residents were 65 years of age or older. For every 100 females there were 100.0 males, and for every 100 females age 18 and over there were 90.5 males age 18 and over.

0.0% of residents lived in urban areas, while 100.0% lived in rural areas.

There were 506 households in Cave Spring, of which 31.0% had children under the age of 18 living in them. Of all households, 38.7% were married-couple households, 23.7% were households with a male householder and no spouse or partner present, and 29.2% were households with a female householder and no spouse or partner present. About 31.6% of all households were made up of individuals and 14.8% had someone living alone who was 65 years of age or older.

There were 564 housing units, of which 10.3% were vacant. The homeowner vacancy rate was 0.0% and the rental vacancy rate was 5.3%.

=== 2000 census ===
As of the census of 2000, there were 975 people, 404 households, and 281 families residing in the city. The population density was 242.7 inhabitants per square mile (93.7/km^{2}). There were 431 housing units at an average density of 107.3 per square mile (41.4/km^{2}). The racial makeup of the city was 84.82% White, 12.41% African American, 0.62% Native American, 0.10% Pacific Islander, 1.44% from other races, and 0.62% from two or more races. Hispanic or Latino people of any race were 2.15% of the population.

There were 404 households, out of which 28.2% had children under the age of 18 living with them, 52.0% were married couples living together, 14.9% had a female householder with no husband present, and 30.2% were non-families. 29.5% of all households were made up of individuals, and 15.3% had someone living alone who was 65 years of age or older. The average household size was 2.36 and the average family size was 2.89.

In the city, the population was spread out, with 23.7% under the age of 18, 5.1% from 18 to 24, 23.8% from 25 to 44, 24.5% from 45 to 64, and 22.9% who were 65 years of age or older. The median age was 44 years. For every 100 females, there were 83.3 males. For every 100 females age 18 and over, there were 75.5 males.

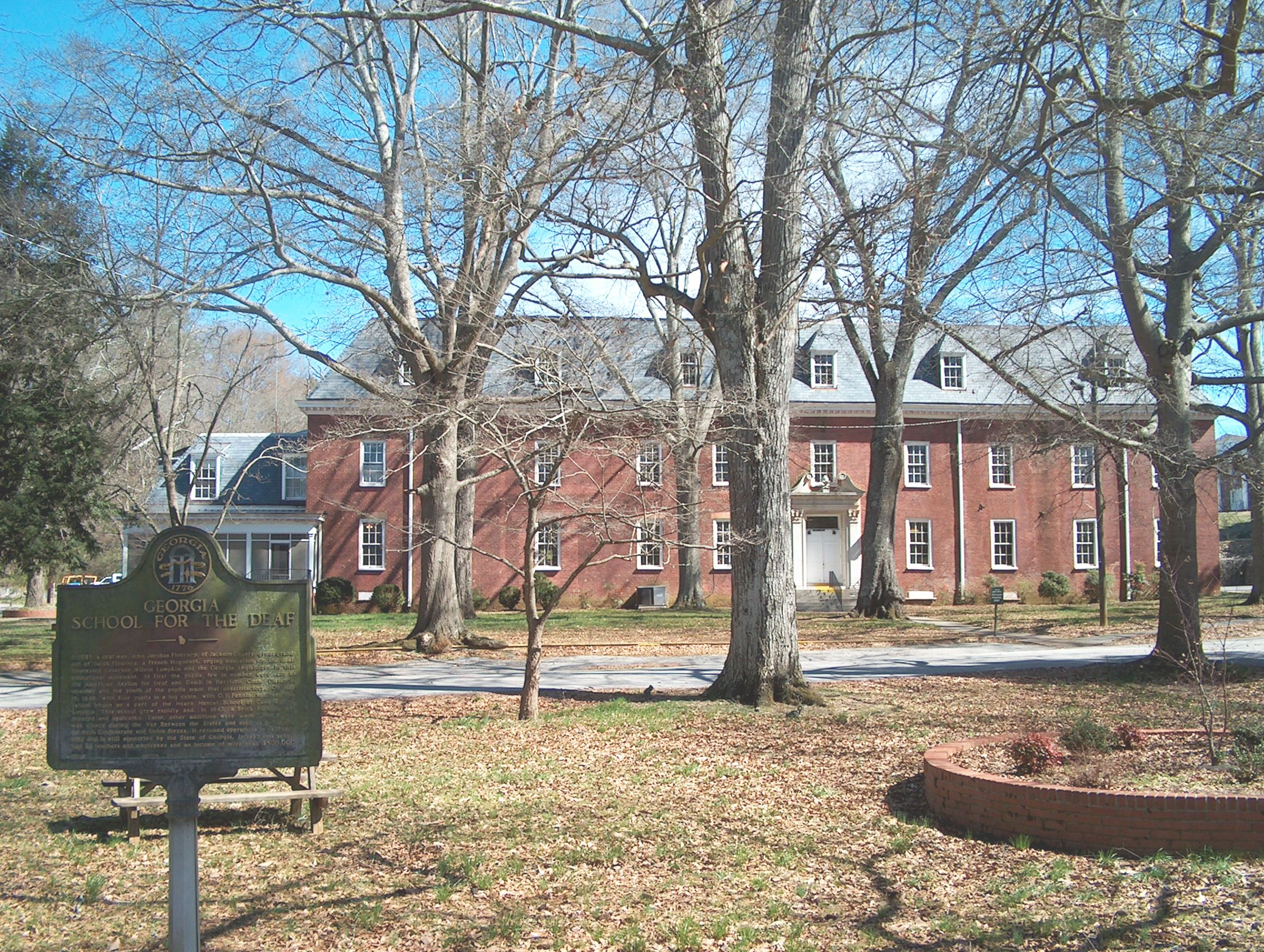
The building of the Georgia School for the Deaf, Fannin Hall, was built in 1846. It was later used as a field hospital for Civil War soldiers. It is now city hall of Cave Spring.

The median income for a household in the city was $33,750, and the median income for a family was $47,917. Males had a median income of $35,395 versus $20,962 for females. The per capita income for the city was $17,850. About 14.0% of families and 15.1% of the population were below the poverty line, including 22.6% of those under age 18 and 13.9% of those age 65 or over.

== Education ==
Cave Spring is within the Floyd County School District. Cave Spring was formerly home to Cave Spring Elementary School until it closed in 2022. The zoned middle and high schools serving Cave Spring are Coosa Middle School and Coosa High School.

Cave Spring is the home of the Georgia School for the Deaf, established in 1846. It is a state-funded residential school operating under the auspices of the Office of Special Services of the Georgia State Department of Education and the Georgia State Board of Education. It aims to ensure that appropriate educational programs are available for hearing-impaired and multi-handicapped hearing-impaired students residing in Georgia. GSD was once a field hospital for both Confederate and Union troops during the Civil War.
