= Prairie Island Township, Merrick County, Nebraska =

Prairie Island Township
- Township
- Location in Merrick County
- Coordinates: 41°08′25″N 097°52′57″W
- Country: United States
- State: Nebraska
- County: Merrick

Area
  - Total: 15.03 sq mi (38.92 km^{2})
  - Land: 12.98 sq mi (33.63 km^{2})
  - Water: 2.04 sq mi (5.29 km^{2}) 13.59%
- Elevation: 1,657 ft (505 m)

Population (2020)
  - Total: 82
  - Density: 6.3/sq mi (2.4/km^{2})
- GNIS feature ID: 0838202

Prairie Island Township is one of eleven townships in Merrick County, Nebraska, United States. The population was 82 at the 2020 census. A 2021 estimate placed the township's population at 83.

== See also ==
- County government in Nebraska
