= Silver Creek (Eel River tributary) =

Stream in Indiana, United States

Coordinates: 40°57′33″N 85°51′14″W

Silver Creek is a stream in the U.S. state of Indiana. It is a tributary of the Eel River.

According to tradition, Silver Creek was named from an incident involving stolen silver coins.

== See also ==
- List of rivers of Indiana
