= Coosa High School =

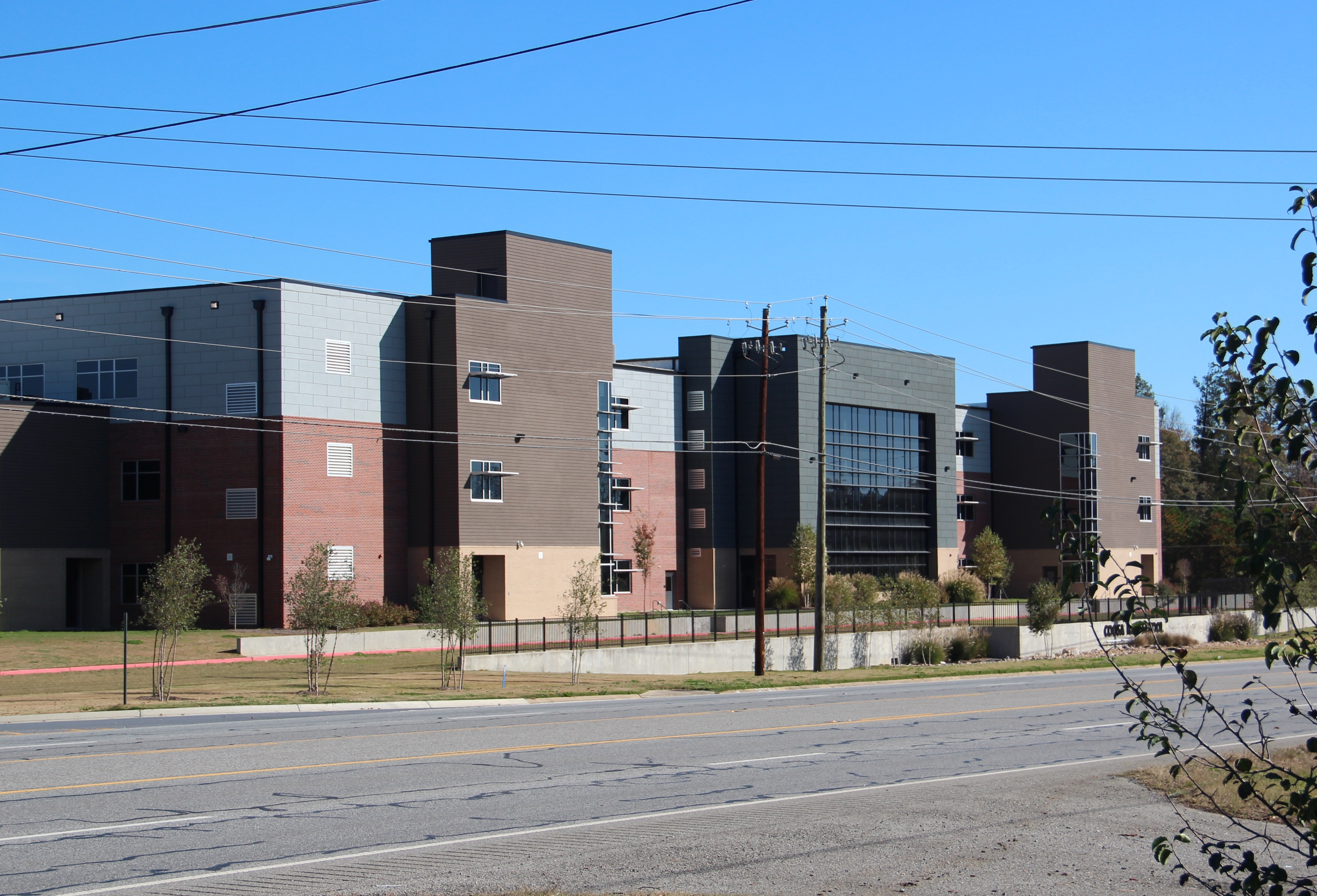

Location
- 4454 Alabama Hwy NW; Rome, Georgia 30165; United States; 34°15′48″N 85°18′15″W

Information
- School type: Public high school
- School district: Floyd County School District
- NCES District ID: 130219000937
- NCES School ID: 1302190
- Principal: Judson Cox
- Grades: 9-12
- Enrollment: 858 (in 2023–2024)
- Colors: Black, Silver, White
- Team name: Eagles
- Website: chs.floydboe.net

Coosa High School is a public high school in unincorporated Floyd County, Georgia, United States, with a Rome, Georgia postal address. A part of the Floyd County School District, it serves the areas of Garden Lakes, Cave Spring, Alto Park, and Coosa Valley. It is one of four high schools within the Floyd County School District.

== About ==
The school colors are black and white. As of October 2026, the principal is Kristen Martin, who previously served as an assistant principal within the Floyd County school system. Coosa High School receives Title I funding.

In 2026-2027, U.S. News & World Report placed Coosa High School 124th out of 522 high schools in Georgia, and 4,612th out of 17,945 high schools nationally. In the same year, the total minority enrollment was 46%, and 71% of students at the school were economically disadvantaged.

== History ==
=== Social justice issues ===
In 2021, the school garnered national attention when four white students were filmed at the school carrying the Confederate flag and using racial slurs on themed "farm day", and the school took no action against these students. A group of racially mixed students planned a protest and the school suspended several of the planners. All of the suspended students were black.

Reports of racism by teachers and some white students against African-American students at Coosa High School, and the refusal of the Floyd County School District to take disciplinary action against the racist behavior have resulted in the school district and board of education in Floyd County being sued by the students and mothers of the students. The civil lawsuit also cites the incident of students wearing Black Lives Matter T-shirts have been suspended, despite the fact the school has taken no action against racist students who used racial slurs against African-American or students who carried the Confederate flag on school grounds.

In August 2024, U.S. District Judge Leigh Martin May dismissed a majority of the claims. The judge ruled that the plaintiffs did not provide adequate evidence to prove that the school district suspended students based on their race, nor did the school system's response policies meet the legal threshold for deliberate indifference.

== Notable alumni ==
- Mike Glenn - professional basketball player
- Diane Harbin - community organizer
- Bernard Holsey - professional football player
- Chris Jones - professional football player
