= Silver Creek Township, Merrick County, Nebraska =

Silver Creek Township
- Township
- Location in Merrick County
- Coordinates: 41°19′58″N 097°39′58″W
- Country: United States
- State: Nebraska
- County: Merrick

Area
  - Total: 44.70 sq mi (115.78 km^{2})
  - Land: 42.4 sq mi (109.8 km^{2})
  - Water: 2.31 sq mi (5.97 km^{2}) 5.16%
- Elevation: 1,549 ft (472 m)

Population (2020)
  - Total: 533
  - Density: 12.6/sq mi (4.85/km^{2})
- GNIS feature ID: 0838255

Silver Creek Township is one of eleven townships in Merrick County, Nebraska, United States. The population was 533 at the 2020 census. A 2021 estimate placed the township's population at 532.

The Village of Silver Creek lies within the Township.

== See also ==
- County government in Nebraska
