= Vieregg Township, Merrick County, Nebraska =

Vieregg Township
- Township
- Location in Merrick County
- Coordinates: 40°59′N 98°14′W
- Country: United States
- State: Nebraska
- County: Merrick

Area
  - Total: 46.49 sq mi (120.42 km^{2})
  - Land: 45.11 sq mi (116.84 km^{2})
  - Water: 1.38 sq mi (3.58 km^{2}) 2.97%
- Elevation: 1,801 ft (549 m)

Population (2020)
  - Total: 765
  - Density: 17.0/sq mi (6.55/km^{2})
- GNIS feature ID: 0838308

Vieregg Township is one of eleven townships in Merrick County, Nebraska, United States. The population was 765 at the 2020 census. A 2021 estimate placed the township's population at 765.

== See also ==
- County government in Nebraska
