= Mead Township, Merrick County, Nebraska =

Town in Nebraska, United States

Mead Township
- Township
- Location in Merrick County
- Coordinates: 41°14′13″N 098°01′08″W
- Country: United States
- State: Nebraska
- County: Merrick

Area
  - Total: 53.1 sq mi (137.5 km^{2})
  - Land: 53.1 sq mi (137.5 km^{2})
  - Water: 0 sq mi (0 km^{2}) 0%
- Elevation: 1,693 ft (516 m)

Population (2020)
  - Total: 177
  - Density: 3.33/sq mi (1.29/km^{2})
- GNIS feature ID: 0838134

Mead Township is one of eleven townships in Merrick County, Nebraska, United States. The population was 177 at the 2020 census. A 2021 estimate placed the township's population at 178.

== See also ==
- County government in Nebraska
