= Silver Creek (West Virginia) =

Stream in West Virginia, U.S.

Coordinates: 37°53′57″N 82°26′13″W

Silver Creek is a stream in the U.S. state of West Virginia.

According to tradition, Silver Creek was named for the fact Indigenous peoples unearthed deposits of silver ore near the creek.

== See also ==
- List of rivers of West Virginia
