= Lindale, Georgia =

Unincorporated community in Georgia, United States

- Unincorporated community Census-designated place
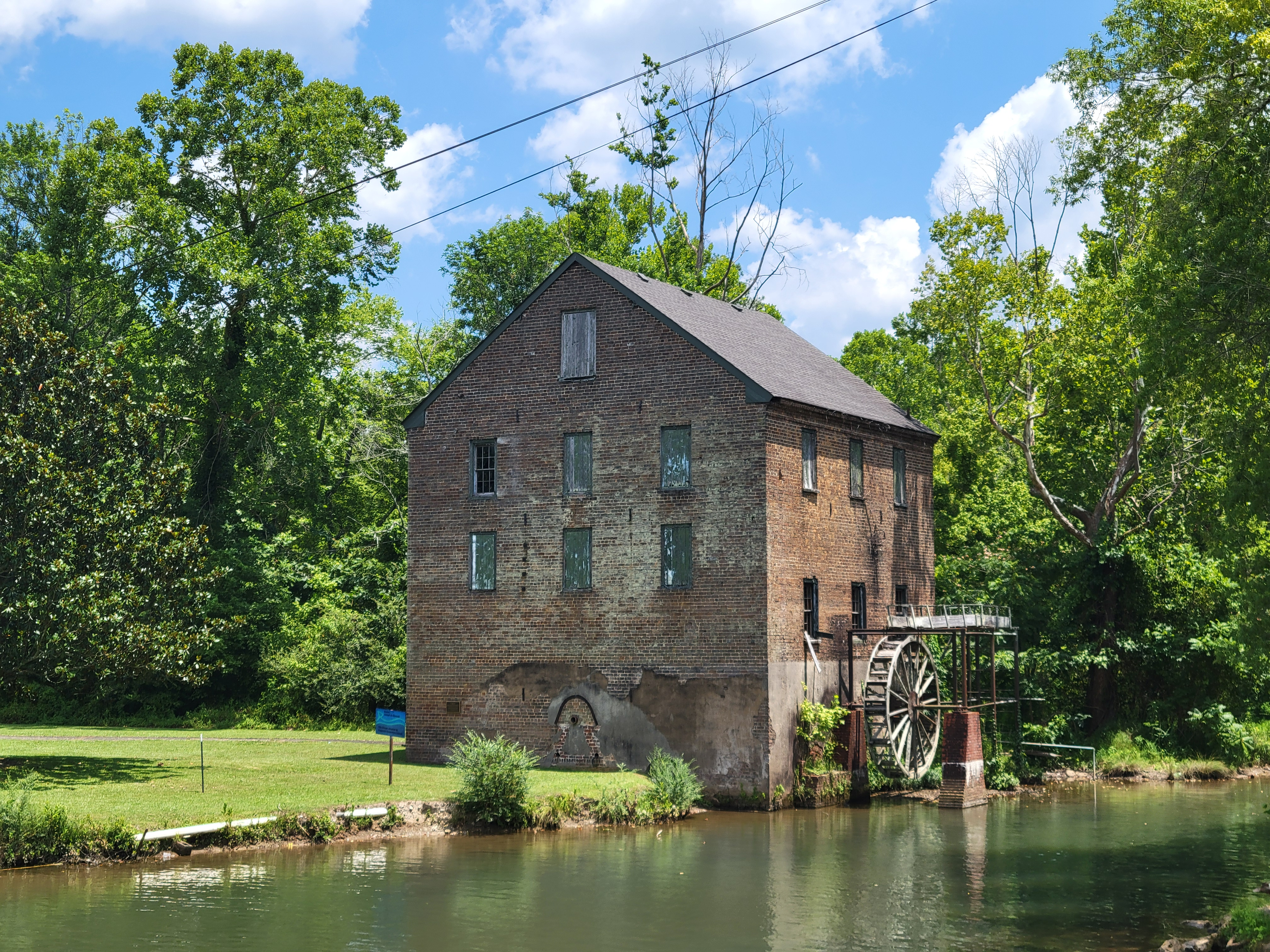
- Old Brick Mill

- Location in Floyd County and the state of Georgia
- Coordinates: 34°11′37″N 85°10′25″W
- Country: United States
- State: Georgia
- County: Floyd

Area
  - Total: 5.60 sq mi (14.50 km^{2})
  - Land: 5.48 sq mi (14.19 km^{2})
  - Water: 0.12 sq mi (0.32 km^{2})
- Elevation: 666 ft (203 m)

Population (2020)
  - Total: 4,283
  - Density: 781.9/sq mi (301.91/km^{2})
- Time zone: UTC-5 (Eastern (EST))
  - Summer (DST): UTC-4 (EDT)
- ZIP code: 30147
- Area codes: 706/762
- FIPS code: 13-46580
- GNIS feature ID: 0332220

Lindale is an unincorporated community and census-designated place (CDP) in Floyd County, Georgia, United States. It is part of the Rome, Georgia Metropolitan Statistical Area. As of the 2020 census, Lindale had a population of 4,283.

== History ==
A post office called Lindale has been in operation since 1883. The name Lindale might have been selected from a novel a resident had read.

Throughout the 20th century, the community formed around the Lindale Textile Mill located in the center of the community. Since the early part of the 21st century, the building is abandoned. The Mill was owned by the West Point-Pepperell for the majority of its existence, leading to the Lindale community to be commonly referred to as "Pepperell".

The local schools, which are part of the Floyd County School System, are named after the mill and use the West Point-Pepperell (currently WestPoint Home) Gryphon as the mascot, under the name "Pepperell Dragons".

== Geography ==
Lindale is located in southeastern Floyd County at 34°11′37″N 85°10′25″W (34.193495, -85.173713). It is bordered to the north by the city of Rome, the county seat.

According to the United States Census Bureau, the Lindale CDP has a total area of 5.5 square miles (14.3 km^{2}), of which 5.4 square miles (14.0 km^{2}) is land and 0.1 square miles (0.3 km^{2}), or 2.20%, is water.

Lindale's borders follow local and state roads, including Booze Mountain Road (for the southern border) and Georgia State Route 101 (for the easternmost city limits).

== Demographics ==
Historical population
Census	Pop.	Note	%±
1970	2,768		—
1980	2,958		6.9%
1990	4,187		41.5%
2000	4,088		−2.4%
2010	4,191		2.5%
2020	4,283		2.2%
U.S. Decennial Census; 1850-1870 1870-1880; 1890-1910 1920-1930; 1940 1950 1960; 1970 1980 1990; 2000 2010 2020

Lindale first appeared as an unincorporated place in the 1970 U.S. census and was designated a census designated place in the 1980 United States census.

=== Racial and ethnic composition ===
Lindale, Georgia – racial and ethnic composition Note: the US Census treats Hispanic/Latino as an ethnic category. This table excludes Latinos from the racial categories and assigns them to a separate category. Hispanics/Latinos may be of any race.
Race / ethnicity (NH = Non-Hispanic)	Pop 2000	Pop 2010	Pop 2020	% 2000	% 2010	% 2020
White alone (NH)	3,835	3,711	3,502	93.81%	88.55%	81.77%
Black or African American alone (NH)	72	178	320	1.76%	4.25%	7.47%
Native American or Alaska Native alone (NH)	6	6	9	0.15%	0.14%	0.21%
Asian alone (NH)	11	34	33	0.27%	0.81%	0.77%
Pacific Islander alone (NH)	0	0	0	0.00%	0.00%	0.00%
Some other race alone (NH)	1	6	22	0.02%	0.14%	0.51%
Mixed-race or multi-racial (NH)	51	50	167	1.25%	1.19%	3.90%
Hispanic or Latino (any race)	112	206	230	2.74%	4.92%	5.37%
Total	4,088	4,191	4,283	100.00%	100.00%	100.00%

=== 2020 census ===
As of the 2020 census, there were 4,283 people, 1,685 households, and 1,227 families residing in the CDP. The median age was 39.7 years. 22.4% of residents were under the age of 18 and 16.2% of residents were 65 years of age or older. For every 100 females, there were 93.9 males, and for every 100 females age 18 and over, there were 91.3 males.

80.9% of residents lived in urban areas, while 19.1% lived in rural areas.

Of all households, 30.8% had children under the age of 18 living in them, 41.1% were married-couple households, 18.7% were households with a male householder and no spouse or partner present, and 31.9% were households with a female householder and no spouse or partner present. About 27.2% of all households were made up of individuals, and 13.0% had someone living alone who was 65 years of age or older.

There were 1,877 housing units, of which 10.2% were vacant. The homeowner vacancy rate was 2.4% and the rental vacancy rate was 8.9%.

=== 2000 census ===
As of the census of 2000, there were 4,088 people, 1,682 households, and 1,165 families residing in the CDP. The population density was 741.6 inhabitants per square mile (286.3/km^{2}). There were 1,796 housing units at an average density of 325.8 per square mile (125.8/km^{2}). The racial makeup of the CDP was 95.01% White, 1.79% African American, 0.17% Native American, 0.27% Asian, 1.32% from other races, and 1.44% from two or more races. Hispanic or Latino people of any race were 2.74% of the population.

There were 1,682 households, out of which 29.4% had children under the age of 18 living with them, 52.5% were married couples living together, 12.4% had a female householder with no husband present, and 30.7% were non-families. 26.5% of all households were made up of individuals, and 12.9% had someone living alone who was 65 years of age or older. The average household size was 2.42 and the average family size was 2.91.

In the CDP, the population was spread out, with 23.8% under the age of 18, 8.3% from 18 to 24, 28.6% from 25 to 44, 21.7% from 45 to 64, and 17.6% who were 65 years of age or older. The median age was 38 years. For every 100 females, there were 94.1 males. For every 100 females age 18 and over, there were 85.8 males.

The median income for a household in the CDP was $28,486, and the median income for a family was $31,563. Males had a median income of $26,657 versus $21,910 for females. The per capita income for the CDP was $15,844. About 10.8% of families and 16.0% of the population were below the poverty line, including 26.0% of those under age 18 and 11.2% of those age 65 or over.

== Education ==
Lindale is part of the Floyd County School District.

Pepperell Middle School and Pepperell High School serve the Lindale area.

== Notable people ==
- Eric L. Haney, former soldier and writer
- Randy Johnson, football player
- Willard Nixon, former pitcher for Boston Red Sox

== Media recognition ==
In 2015, the science fiction film The Divergent Series: Allegiant, the third installment of the Divergent series, was filmed in Lindale, at the Lindale Mill. Lindale is credited in the movie's final credits.
