= Silver Creek Township =

Silver Creek Township may refer to:

== Illinois ==
- Silver Creek Township, Stephenson County, Illinois

== Indiana ==
- Silver Creek Township, Clark County, Indiana

== Iowa ==
- Silver Creek Township, Ida County, Iowa
- Silver Creek Township, Mills County, Iowa
- Silver Creek Township, Pottawattamie County, Iowa

== Kansas ==
- Silver Creek Township, Cowley County, Kansas

== Michigan ==
- Silver Creek Township, Cass County, Michigan

== Minnesota ==
- Silver Creek Township, Wright County, Minnesota
- Silver Creek Township, Lake County, Minnesota

== Missouri ==
- Silver Creek Township, Randolph County, Missouri

== Nebraska ==
- Silver Creek Township, Burt County, Nebraska
- Silvercreek Township, Dixon County, Nebraska
- Silver Creek Township, Merrick County, Nebraska

== North Carolina ==
- Silver Creek Township, Burke County, North Carolina

== Ohio ==
- Silvercreek Township, Greene County, Ohio

== South Dakota ==
- Silver Creek Township, Sanborn County, South Dakota

== See also ==
- Silver Creek (disambiguation)
