= Silver Creek, Georgia =

- Unincorporated community
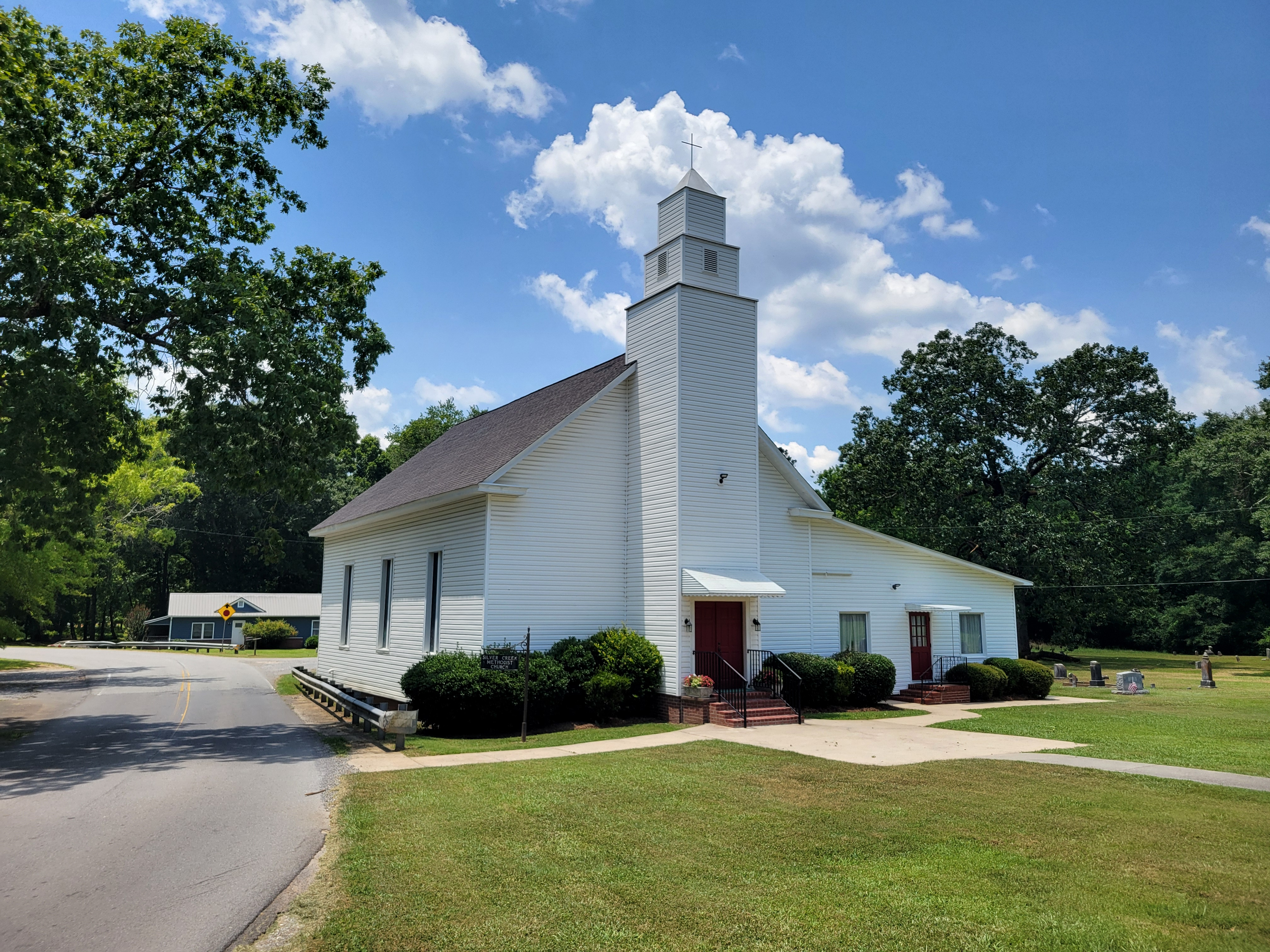
- Silver Creek United Methodist

- Location within Georgia Location within the United States
- Coordinates: 34°10′33″N 85°09′42″W
- Country: United States
- State: Georgia
- County: Floyd
- Time zone: UTC-5 (Eastern (EST))
  - Summer (DST): UTC-4 (EDT)
- ZIP code: 30173
- Area codes: 706/762
- FIPS code: 13-21184
- GNIS feature ID: 326515

Silver Creek is an unincorporated community in Floyd County, Georgia, United States. It is part of the Rome, Georgia Metropolitan Statistical Area.

== History ==
A post office called Silver Creek has been in operation since 1880. The community took its name from nearby Silver Creek.

== Major highways ==
- U.S. Route 411
- State Route 1
- State Route 101
