= Silver Creek, Nebraska =

- Village
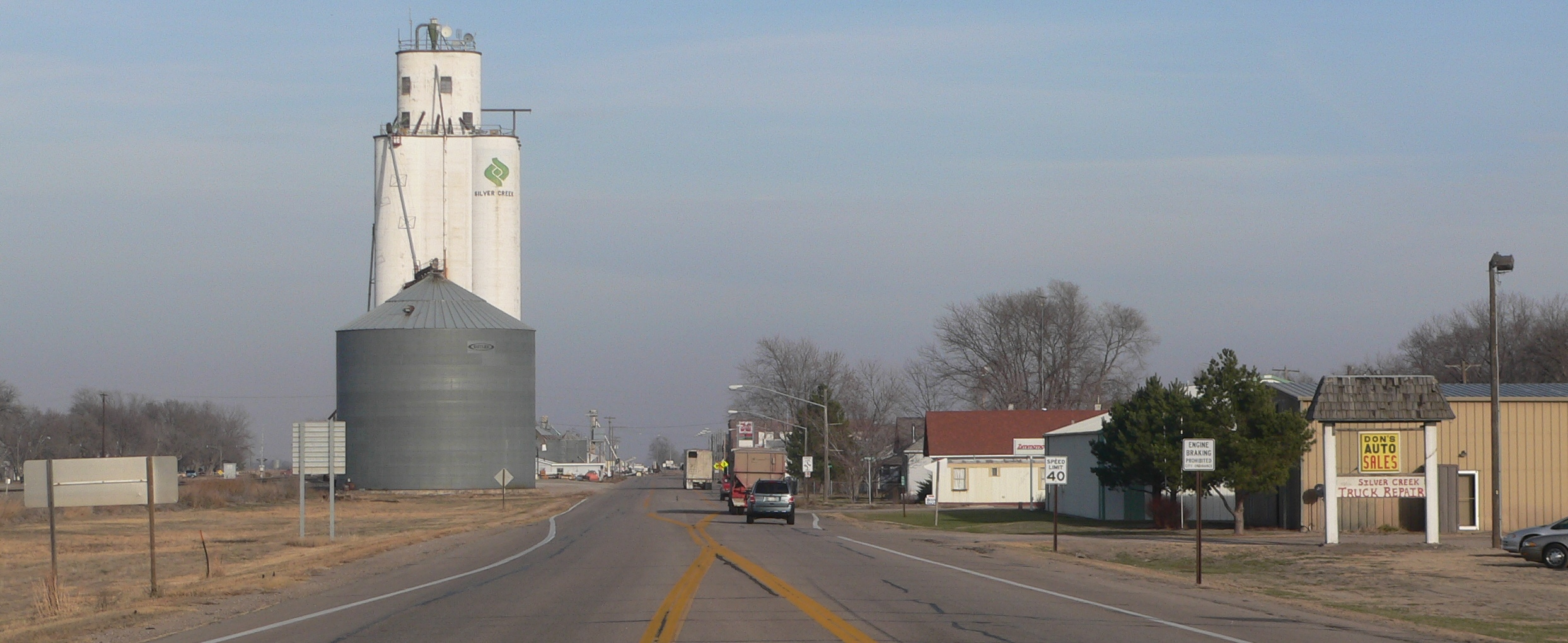
- Silver Creek, seen from the southwest along U.S. Highway 30

- Location in Merrick County and the state of Nebraska
- Coordinates: 41°18′55″N 97°39′54″W
- Country: United States
- State: Nebraska
- County: Merrick

Area
  - Total: 0.28 sq mi (0.72 km^{2})
  - Land: 0.27 sq mi (0.71 km^{2})
  - Water: 0 sq mi (0.00 km^{2})
- Elevation: 1,549 ft (472 m)

Population (2020)
  - Total: 320
  - Density: 1,162.7/sq mi (448.92/km^{2})
- Time zone: UTC-6 (Central (CST))
  - Summer (DST): UTC-5 (CDT)
- ZIP code: 68663
- Area code: 308
- FIPS code: 31-45400
- GNIS feature ID: 2399823
- Website: ci.silver-creek.ne.us

Silver Creek is a village in Merrick County, Nebraska, United States. The population was 320 at the 2020 census. It is part of the Grand Island metropolitan area.

== History ==
Silver Creek was platted in 1866 when the Union Pacific Railroad was extended to that point. It was named from the Silver Creek nearby, which was noted for the clarity of its waters.

== Geography ==
The village is in far northeastern Merrick County, less than a half mile north of the Platte River. U.S. Route 30 passes through the center of the village, leading southwest 22 miles (35 km) to Central City, the county seat, and northeast 19 miles (31 km) to Columbus. Nebraska Highway 39 passes just west of the village, leading north 10 miles (16 km) to Genoa and south across the Platte 9 miles (14 km) to its terminus at Nebraska Highway 92, with Osceola a further 5 miles (8 km) to the east.

According to the U.S. Census Bureau, Silver Creek has a total area of 0.28 square miles (0.73 km^{2}), all land. The eponymous Silver Creek flows past the south end of the village, joining the Platte River at the Highway 39 bridge.

== Demographics ==
Historical population
Census	Pop.	Note	%±
1900	291		—
1910	379		30.2%
1920	583		53.8%
1930	464		−20.4%
1940	421		−9.3%
1950	444		5.5%
1960	431		−2.9%
1970	483		12.1%
1980	496		2.7%
1990	625		26.0%
2000	441		−29.4%
2010	362		−17.9%
2020	320		−11.6%
U.S. Decennial Census

=== 2010 census ===
As of the census of 2010, there were 362 people, 168 households, and 97 families residing in the village. The population density was 1,292.9 inhabitants per square mile (499.2/km^{2}). There were 194 housing units at an average density of 692.9 per square mile (267.5/km^{2}). The racial makeup of the village was 98.6% White, 0.3% Native American, and 1.1% from other races. Hispanic or Latino of any race were 3.6% of the population.

There were 168 households, of which 23.8% had children under the age of 18 living with them, 44.6% were married couples living together, 8.9% had a female householder with no husband present, 4.2% had a male householder with no wife present, and 42.3% were non-families. 35.7% of all households were made up of individuals, and 20.3% had someone living alone who was 65 years of age or older. The average household size was 2.15 and the average family size was 2.82.

The median age in the village was 47.5 years. 21.5% of residents were under the age of 18; 6.5% were between the ages of 18 and 24; 19.1% were from 25 to 44; 27.6% were from 45 to 64; and 25.4% were 65 years of age or older. The gender makeup of the village was 50.3% male and 49.7% female.

=== 2000 census ===
As of the census of 2000, there were 441 people, 195 households, and 121 families residing in the village. The population density was 1,532.6 inhabitants per square mile (591.7/km^{2}). There were 206 housing units at an average density of 715.9 per square mile (276.4/km^{2}). The racial makeup of the village was 99.55% White, 0.23% African American, and 0.23% from two or more races. Hispanic or Latino of any race were 0.23% of the population.

There were 195 households, out of which 28.2% had children under the age of 18 living with them, 50.3% were married couples living together, 8.2% had a female householder with no husband present, and 37.9% were non-families. 32.3% of all households were made up of individuals, and 20.0% had someone living alone who was 65 years of age or older. The average household size was 2.26 and the average family size was 2.88.

In the village, the population was spread out, with 26.3% under the age of 18, 7.5% from 18 to 24, 22.4% from 25 to 44, 21.8% from 45 to 64, and 22.0% who were 65 years of age or older. The median age was 38 years. For every 100 females, there were 87.7 males. For every 100 females age 18 and over, there were 85.7 males.

As of 2000 the median income for a household in the village was $29,732, and the median income for a family was $39,375. Males had a median income of $29,125 versus $19,375 for females. The per capita income for the village was $13,584. About 7.1% of families and 11.2% of the population were below the poverty line, including 6.7% of those under age 18 and 17.2% of those age 65 or over.
