= National Register of Historic Places listings in Floyd County, Georgia =

Location of Floyd County in Georgia

This is a list of properties and districts in Floyd County, Georgia that are listed on the National Register of Historic Places (NRHP).

This National Park Service list is complete through NPS recent listings posted November 13, 2026.

== Current listings ==
	Name on the Register	Image	Date listed	Location	City or town	Description
1	Dr. Robert Battey House	Dr. Robert Battey House	June 17, 1982 (#82002414)	725 E. 2nd Ave. 34°14′35″N 85°09′54″W	Rome	
2	Berry Schools	Berry Schools	July 21, 1978 (#78000981)	N of Rome on U.S. 27; 34°18′27″N 85°12′49″W	Rome	
3	Between the Rivers Historic District	Between the Rivers Historic District	June 9, 1983 (#83000193)	Roughly bounded by the Etowah and Oostanaula Rivers, and 7th Ave. 34°15′06″N 85°10′16″W	Rome	Historic district with more than 200 buildings, plus the Rome Clock Tower and a historic bridge.
4	John M. Carroll House	John M. Carroll House	June 19, 1980 (#80001021)	Park St. 34°06′09″N 85°20′23″W	Cave Spring	
5	Carroll-Harper House	Carroll-Harper House	June 19, 1980 (#80001023)	Cedartown St. 34°06′13″N 85°20′10″W	Cave Spring	
6	Carroll-Richardson Grist Mill	Carroll-Richardson Grist Mill	June 19, 1980 (#80001025)	Mill St. 34°06′04″N 85°20′27″W	Cave Spring	
7	Cave Spring Commercial Historic District	Cave Spring Commercial Historic District	June 19, 1980 (#80001028)	Alabama, Rome and Cedartown Rds., Broad and Padlock Sts. 34°06′27″N 85°20′11″W	Cave Spring	
8	Cave Spring Female Academy	Cave Spring Female Academy	June 19, 1980 (#80001030)	Rome St. 34°06′43″N 85°19′59″W	Cave Spring	
9	Cave Spring High School		June 19, 1980 (#80001032)	Rome St. 34°06′37″N 85°20′07″W	Cave Spring	Demolished
10	Cave Spring Railroad Station	Cave Spring Railroad Station	June 19, 1980 (#80001034)	23 Alabama St, Cave Spring, GA 30124; 34°06′28″N 85°20′32″W	Cave Spring	No longer an active train station but still an existing structure currently occupied by a private business.
11	Cave Spring Residential Historic District		June 19, 1980 (#80001035)	U.S. 411 and GA 100; 34°06′29″N 85°20′22″W	Cave Spring	
12	Chieftains	Chieftains	April 7, 1971 (#71000273)	80 Chatillon Rd. 34°16′38″N 85°10′13″W	Rome	National Historic Landmark
13	Chubb Methodist Episcopal Church	Chubb Methodist Episcopal Church	May 4, 1990 (#90000728)	Chubbtown Rd. 34°05′12″N 85°16′59″W	Cave Spring	
14	Wesley O. Conner House	Wesley O. Conner House	June 19, 1980 (#80001037)	Cedartown St. 34°06′00″N 85°19′51″W	Cave Spring	
15	Coosa Country Club Golf Course	Coosa Country Club Golf Course	April 14, 2022 (#100007578)	110 Branham Ave SW; 34°15′22″N 85°11′00″W	Rome	
16	William D. Cowdry Plantation		June 19, 1980 (#80001039)	Rome Rd. 34°07′01″N 85°20′10″W	Cave Spring	
17	Double Cola Bottling Company	Double Cola Bottling Company	August 30, 2006 (#06000738)	419 E. Second Ave. 34°14′52″N 85°10′10″W	Rome	
18	East Rome Historic District		July 25, 1985 (#85001637)	Roughly bounded by Walnut Ave., McCall Blvd., E. 8th and 10th Sts. 34°14′30″N 85°09′53″W	Rome	
19	Fairview School	Fairview School	June 5, 2017 (#100001019)	278 Padlock Mountain Rd., SW. 34°06′06″N 85°18′53″W	Cave Spring	
20	Oliver P. Fannin House		June 19, 1980 (#80001041)	Cedartown St. 34°06′16″N 85°20′13″W	Cave Spring	
21	Floyd County Courthouse	Floyd County Courthouse	September 18, 1980 (#80001067)	5th Ave., and Tribune St. 34°15′22″N 85°10′17″W	Rome	Partially burned on March 23, 2026
22	Joseph Ford House	Joseph Ford House	June 19, 1980 (#80001043)	2 Old Cedartown Rd; 34°06′23″N 85°20′12″W	Cave Spring	
23	Georgia School for the Deaf Historic District	Georgia School for the Deaf Historic District	June 19, 1980 (#80001045)	Padlock St. 34°06′27″N 85°20′00″W	Cave Spring	
24	Jackson Hill Historic District	Jackson Hill Historic District	April 25, 1997 (#97000370)	Jackson Hill, between GA 53 and the Oostanaula River; 34°15′51″N 85°09′52″W	Rome	
25	Lower Avenue A Historic District		September 1, 1983 (#83000194)	Avenue A between N. 5th St. and Turner-McCall Blvd. 34°15′33″N 85°10′24″W	Rome	
26	Main High School	Main High School	October 24, 2002 (#02001219)	41 Washington Dr. 34°15′27″N 85°09′15″W	Rome	
27	John T. Mann House	John T. Mann House	June 19, 1980 (#80001047)	Rivers St. 34°06′33″N 85°20′12″W	Cave Spring	
28	Mayo's Bar Lock and Dam	Mayo's Bar Lock and Dam	November 16, 1989 (#89002020)	On the Coosa River, 8 mi. SW of Rome; 34°12′02″N 85°15′21″W	Rome	
29	Dr. W. T. McKinney House		June 19, 1980 (#80001049)	Cedartown St. 34°05′59″N 85°20′19″W	Cave Spring	
30	Mt. Aventine Historic District		August 18, 1983 (#83000195)	Address Restricted	Rome	
31	Myrtle Hill Cemetery	Myrtle Hill Cemetery	September 1, 1983 (#83000196)	Bounded by S. Broad, and Myrtle Sts., Pennington, and Branham Aves. 34°15′07″N 85°10′46″W	Rome	
32	Oakdene Place	Oakdene Place	August 4, 1983 (#83000197)	Roughly bounded by the Etowah River, Queen, and E. 6th Sts. 34°14′38″N 85°10′08″W	Rome	
33	Old Brick Mill	Old Brick Mill	September 9, 1993 (#93000936)	Park St. at Silver Cr. 34°11′19″N 85°10′28″W	Lindale	
34	Rivers Farm	Rivers Farm	June 19, 1980 (#80001051)	Rome St. 34°07′00″N 85°20′13″W	Cave Spring	
35	Samuel W. Robbins House	Samuel W. Robbins House	June 19, 1980 (#80001053)	Rome St. 34°06′30″N 85°20′10″W	Cave Spring	The photo is not the Robbins House per the photo in the nomination. The Robbins house is directly across the street.
36	Rolator Park Historic District		June 19, 1980 (#80001055)	Off U.S. 411; 34°06′16″N 85°20′07″W	Cave Spring	
37	Rome Clock Tower	Rome Clock Tower	February 8, 1980 (#80001068)	Off GA 101; 34°15′13″N 85°10′09″W	Rome	
38	Roving House		June 19, 1980 (#80001057)	Rome St. 34°06′39″N 85°19′49″W	Cave Spring	
39	Sardis Presbyterian Church and Cemetery	Sardis Presbyterian Church and Cemetery	January 12, 2005 (#04001468)	7104 GA 20 NW; 34°15′55″N 85°22′41″W	Coosa	
40	Simmons House	Simmons House	June 19, 1980 (#80001059)	Cedartown St. 34°05′57″N 85°19′59″W	Cave Spring	
41	William S. Simmons Plantation		June 19, 1980 (#80001061)	Alabama St. 34°06′03″N 85°20′41″W	Cave Spring	
42	South Broad Street Historic District		August 18, 1983 (#83004182)	S. Broad St. and Etowah Terrace; 34°14′57″N 85°10′40″W	Rome	
43	Sullivan-Hillyer House	Sullivan-Hillyer House	October 21, 2002 (#02001215)	309 E. Second Ave. 34°15′00″N 85°10′17″W	Rome	
44	Thankful Baptist Church	Thankful Baptist Church	September 5, 1985 (#85001973)	935 Spiderwebb Dr. 34°15′28″N 85°09′36″W	Rome	
45	U.S. Post Office and Courthouse	U.S. Post Office and Courthouse	May 6, 1975 (#75000592)	W. 4th Ave. and E. 1st St. 34°15′14″N 85°10′15″W	Rome	
46	Upper Avenue A Historic District		September 1, 1983 (#83000198)	Roughly bounded by Oostanaula River, Turner-McCall Blvd., Avenue B and W. 11th St. 34°15′45″N 85°10′27″W	Rome	
47	George T. Watts House	George T. Watts House	June 19, 1980 (#80001063)	Love St. 34°06′22″N 85°20′24″W	Cave Spring	
48	Wharton-Trout House	Wharton-Trout House	June 19, 1980 (#80001065)	Rome St. 34°06′53″N 85°19′44″W	Cave Spring	
