= Conner House (disambiguation) =

Conner House may refer to:

in the United States

(by state, then city)

- Wesley O. Conner House, Cave Spring, Georgia, listed on the National Register of Historic Places (NRHP)
- William Conner House, Fishers, Indiana, NRHP-listed
- George Conner House, Fredericktown, Kentucky, NRHP-listed
- Donald L. Conner House, Midland, Michigan, NRHP-listed
- Alexander Conner House, Xenia, Ohio, NRHP-listed
- Dr. Beadie E. and Willie R. Conner House and Park, Austin, Texas, listed on the NRHP in Travis County, Texas
- Conner House, Manassas Park, Virginia, NRHP-listed

== See also ==
- Connor House (disambiguation)
