= Rock Mountain (Georgia) =

Mountains

Rock Mountain is a name used to describe three different mountains located in the North Georgia mountains that are in two different Georgia counties.

== Floyd County ==
- Rock Mountain is a 1,420-foot (430 m) mountain located west of Armuchee, Georgia. It was named for its rocky peak. It is the location of the Rocky Mountain Project and the Rocky Mountain Hydroelectric Plant. 34°20′25.03″N 85°18′52.85″W

== Rabun County ==
- A 3,680-foot (1,120 m) mountain called Rock Mountain is located on the eastern Continental Divide in northeast Rabun County not far from the highest point in the county, Rabun Bald. 34°54′53.56″N 83°20′38.97″W
- Rock Mountain, elevation 2,824 feet (861 m), is located on the west bank of the Tallulah River near its confluence with the Coleman River. 34°56′18.01″N 83°33′5.94″W
