= Conasauga =

Conasauga may refer to:

- Conasauga, Georgia, a ghost town
- Conasauga, McMinn County, Tennessee, an unincorporated community
- Conasauga, Polk County, Tennessee, an unincorporated community
- Conasauga Creek, a stream in Tennessee
- Conasauga River, a river in Tennessee and Georgia
- Conasauga shale, a type of shale
- Lake Conasauga
- Lake Conasauga (Floyd County, Georgia)
- USS Conasauga (AOG-15)
