= Foster Mills, Georgia =

Unincorporated community in Georgia, U.S.

Coordinates: 34°09′58″N 85°20′34″W

Foster Mills is an unincorporated community in Floyd County, in the U.S. state of Georgia.

== History ==
A post office called Foster's Mills was established in 1886, and remained in operation until it was discontinued in 1907. The community was named for brothers John and Greene Foster, who operated a mill there.
