= Chulio, Georgia =

Unincorporated community in Georgia, U.S.

Coordinates: 34°09′50″N 85°05′54″W

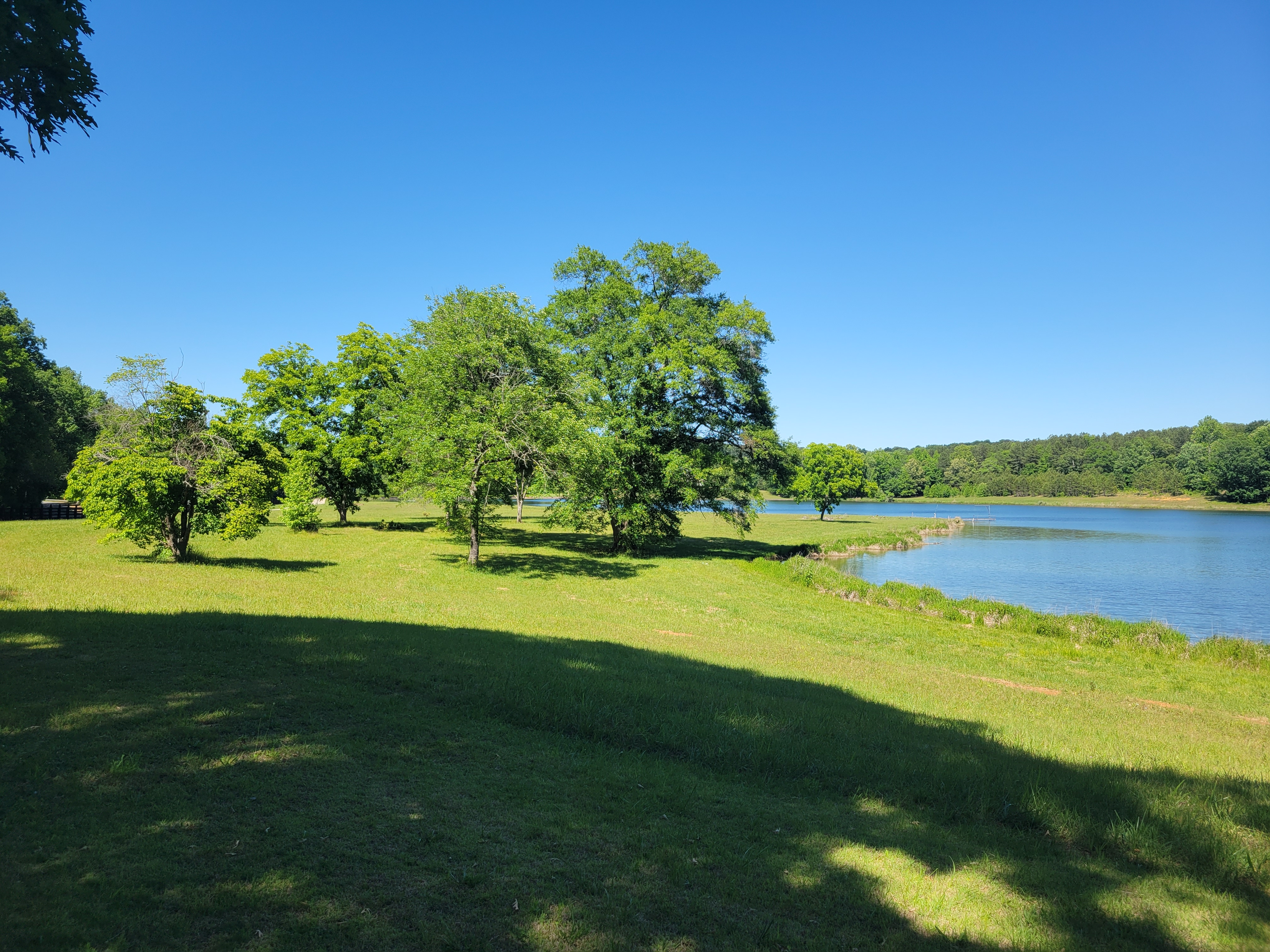
Padgetts Lake

Chulio is an unincorporated community in Floyd County, in the U.S. state of Georgia.

== History ==
A post office called Chulio was established in 1878, and remained in operation until it was discontinued in 1901. The community was named for Chulioa, a Cherokee Indian.
