= Anniedelle, Georgia =

Unincorporated community in Georgia, U.S.

Coordinates: 34°13′03″N 85°23′51″W

Anniedelle is an unincorporated community in Floyd County, in the U.S. state of Georgia.

== History ==
A post office was established at Anniedelle in 1893, and remained in operation until it was discontinued in 1901. The community was named in honor of Sadayi a.k.a. "Annie Ax", a local Cherokee woman. A variant spelling was "Anniedell".
