= Cress Spring =

Coordinates: 34°08′56″N 85°17′05″W

Cress Spring is a spring that lies in Floyd County, in the U.S. state of Georgia.

Cress Spring was found for the watercress found there.
