= Sardis Presbyterian Church and Cemetery =

Historic church in Georgia, United States

- U.S. National Register of Historic Places
- U.S. Historic district
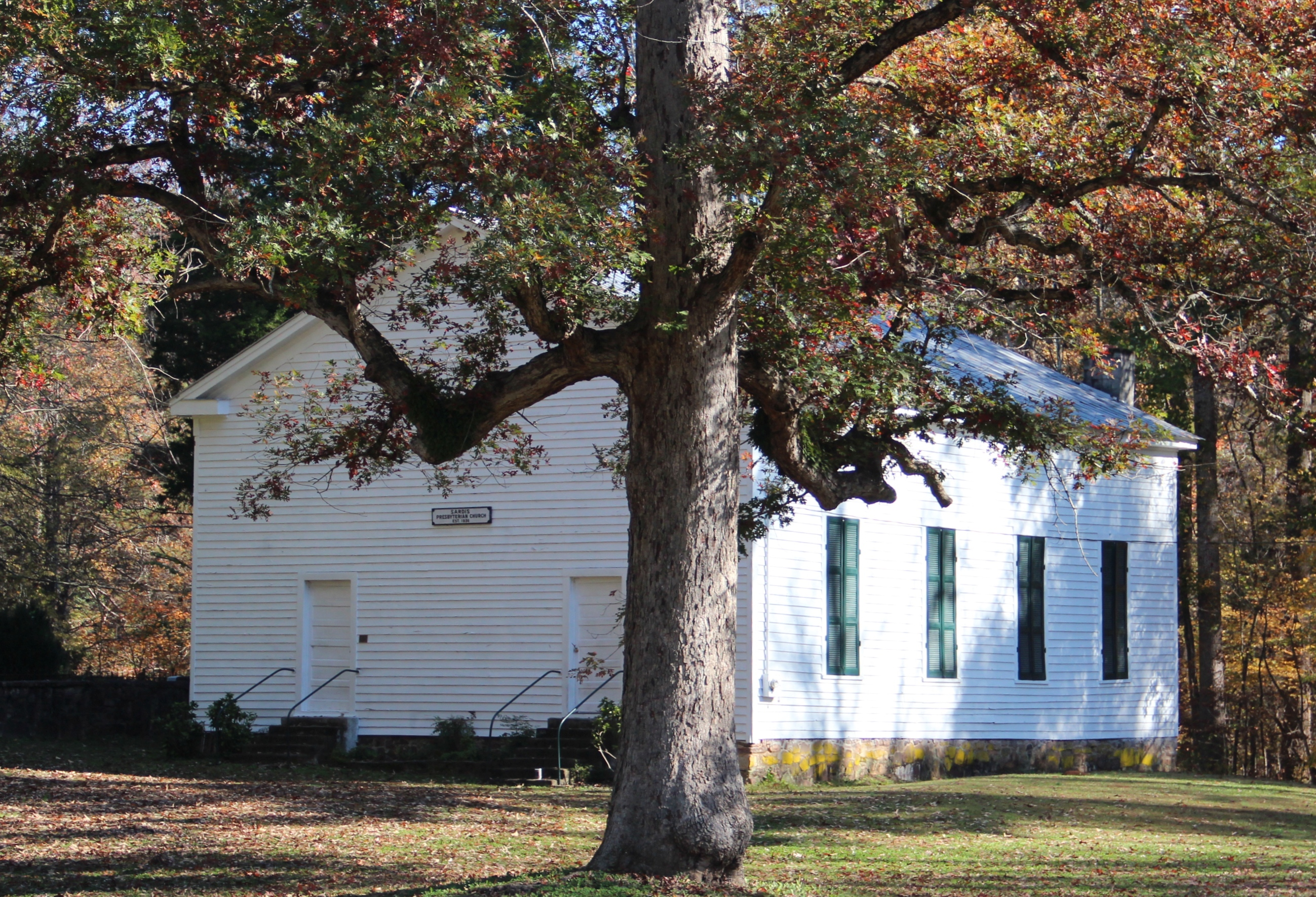
- Sardis Presbyterian Church and Cemetery in 2017

- Location within Georgia Location within the United States
- Nearest city: Coosa, Georgia
- Coordinates: 34°15′55″N 85°22′41″W
- Area: 6.2 acres (2.5 ha)
- Built: 1836, 1855
- NRHP reference No.: 04001468
- Added to NRHP: January 12, 2005

The Sardis Presbyterian Church and Cemetery in Coosa, Georgia. is a historic Presbyterian church property. The cemetery was established in 1836 and the church was built in 1855.

The church's membership declined to just two members in 1979. The church is maintained by the Sardis Preservation Society.

The property was added to the National Register of Historic Places in 2005.

The church is a one-story one-room front-gabled wood-frame building with clapboard siding, on a stone foundation, facing west. The north and south sides each have four 9 over 9 windows with c.1877 plantation-style shutters to protect them.

As of 2004, the cemetery had about 235 burials. It is bounded on two sides with a four-foot tall stone wall that has a wrought iron gate.
