= Connor House =

Connor House may refer to:

- Connor House (Yuma, Arizona), listed on the National Register of Historic Places (NRHP) in Yuma County
- Connor House (Rock Island, Illinois), listed on the NRHP
- Connor-Bovie House, Fairfield, Maine, listed on the NRHP in Somerset County
- Burton-Conner_House, Cambridge, Massachusetts
- Connor Toll House in Signal Mountain, Tennessee, listed on the NRHP in Hamilton County

== See also ==
- Conner House (disambiguation)
