= DeSoto Lake =

- Location within Georgia
- Location: Floyd County, Georgia
- Coordinates: 34°13′27″N 85°11′03″W
- Type: reservoir
- Basin countries: United States
- Surface elevation: 189 m (620 ft)

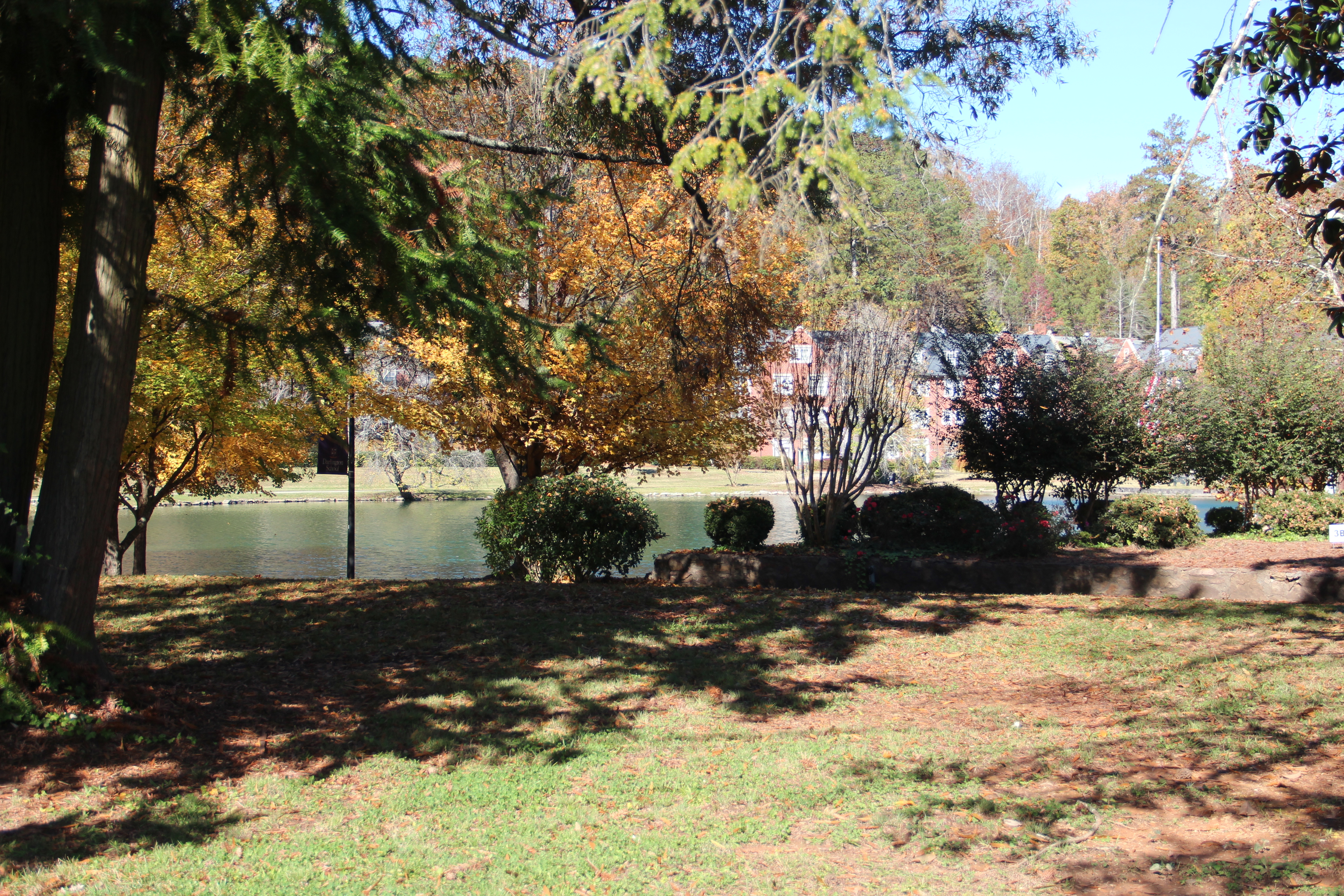
DeSoto Lake on the Darlington School campus

DeSoto Lake is a reservoir in Floyd County, in the U.S. state of Georgia.

The lake was named for Hernando de Soto, a Spanish explorer.

== See also ==
- List of lakes in Georgia (U.S. state)
