= Rocky Mountain Hydroelectric Plant =

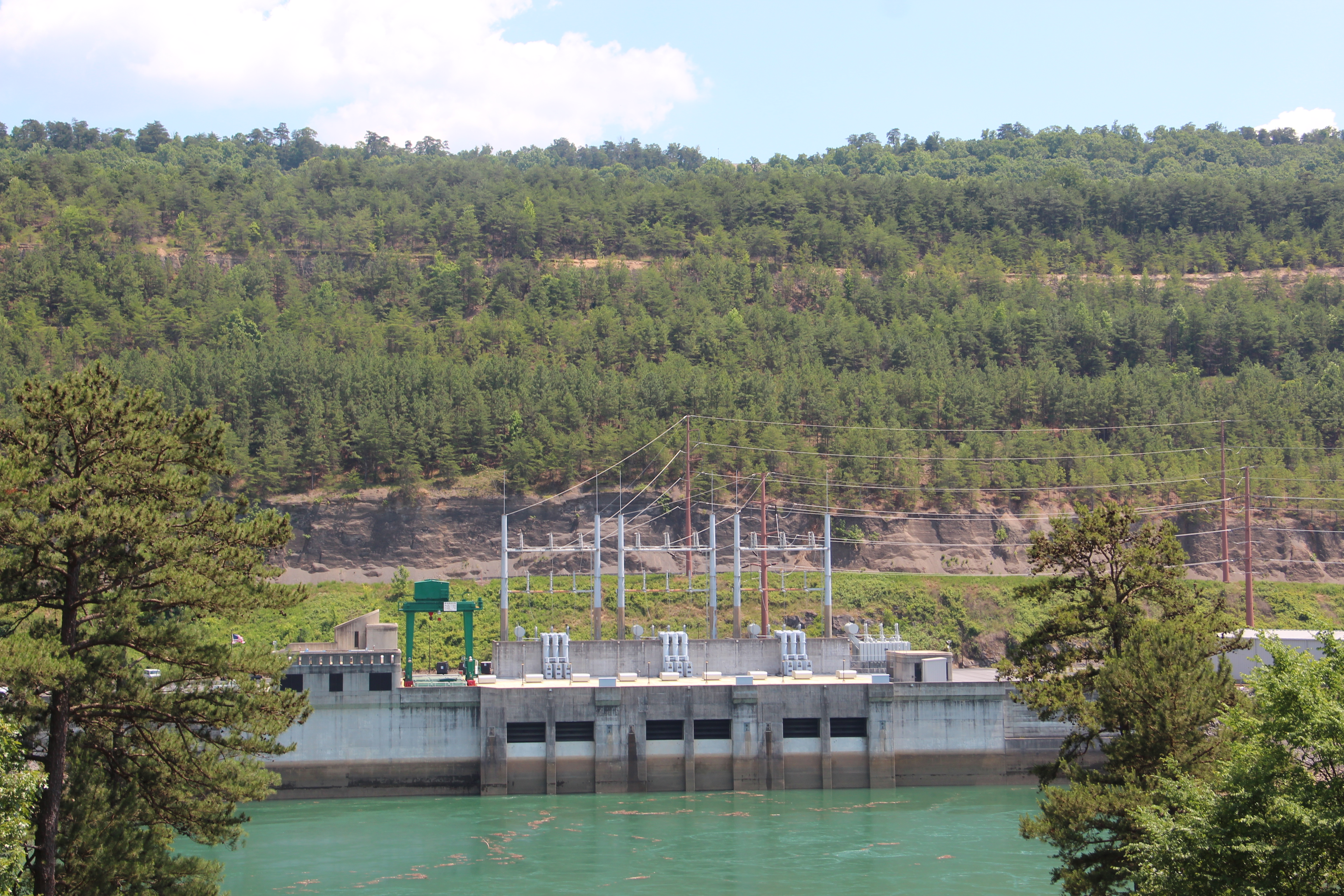
- View of the power station
- Country: United States
- Location: Floyd County, near Rome, Georgia
- Coordinates: 34°21′20″N 85°18′14″W
- Status: Operational
- Construction began: 1977
- Opening date: 1995
- Construction cost: $1 billion
- Owner(s): Oglethorpe Power (75%); Georgia Power (25%)
- Operator(s): Oglethorpe Power

Upper reservoir
- Creates: Rocky Mountain Upper
- Total capacity: 10,650 acre⋅ft (13,140,000 m^{3})

Lower reservoir
- Creates: Rocky Mountain Lower
- Total capacity: 18,800 acre⋅ft (23,200,000 m^{3})

Power Station
- Hydraulic head: 613 ft (187 m) (minimum net)
- Pump-generators: 3 x 365 MW (489,000 hp) Francis pump-turbines
- Installed capacity: 1,095 MW (1,468,000 hp)

The Rocky Mountain Hydroelectric Plant is a pumped-storage power plant located 10 miles (16 km) northwest of Rome in the U.S. state of Georgia. It is named after Rock Mountain on top of which the plant's upper reservoir is located. Construction on the plant began in 1977 and it was commissioned in 1995. After upgrades were completed in 2011, the plant has an installed capacity of 1,095 megawatts (1,468,000 hp). It is owned by both Oglethorpe Power and Georgia Power which have 75 percent and 25 percent stakes, respectively.

== Background ==
After Georgia Power applied for a Federal Energy Regulatory Commission (FERC) license to operate the plant in 1972, they began to carry out design studies and plans for land acquisition. Construction on the project began in 1977 after the FERC license was granted. The initial phase included the tunnels, penstocks, roads and bridges. Construction was suspended in 1985 when the project was 20 percent complete. In 1987, Oglethorpe Power, who was in need of a pumped-storage plant, began negotiations with Georgia Power to complete the power plant. On 15 December 1988, the two power companies reached an agreement after Oglethorpe received a US$706.8 million loan guarantee. The agreement allowed Oglethorpe to operate the plant and have a 75 percent stake in ownership. Construction on the power plant restarted shortly after the agreement. In 1995 the power plant was completed and the generators commissioned. The project cost $1 billion and it was dedicated on 9 October 1995. An upgrade of the power station was completed in 2011 which increased the installed generating capacity of each turbine-generator from 283 megawatts (380,000 hp) to 365 megawatts (489,000 hp). This increased the installed capacity of the plant from 849 megawatts (1,139,000 hp) to 1,095 MW. The power of the pumps was also increased as well. The upgrade may seem early for the young power plant but the turbines, pumps and inlet valves were purchased before construction was suspended and sat in storage.

== Design and operation ==
As a pumped-storage power plant, it uses two reservoirs to produce electricity and store energy. The upper reservoir stores water (energy) for periods when electricity demand is high. During these periods, water from the upper reservoir is released down to the power plant to produce hydroelectricity. Water from the power plant is then discharged into the lower reservoir. When energy demand is low, usually at night, water is pumped from the lower reservoir back up to the upper reservoir. The upper reservoir can be replenished in as little as 7.2 hours. The same turbine-generators that are used to generate electricity reverse into pumps during pumping mode.

The upper reservoir is formed on Rocky Mountain above the lower reservoir by a 120-foot (37 m) tall and 12,895-foot (3,930 m) long continuous earth and rock-fill dam. It can store up to 10,650 acre-feet (13,140,000 m^{3}) of water and its surface area covers 221 acres (89 ha). The upper reservoir lies at an elevation of 1,392 feet (424 m) while the lower reservoir is at 710.5 feet (216.6 m). The lower reservoir impounds Heath Creek and is created by two embankment dams and one gravity/embankment composite dam. The composite dam is 120 feet (37 m) tall and the gravity section features a spillway with two tainter gates. The other two embankment dams serve as auxiliary dams. The lower reservoir can store up to 18,800 acre-feet (23,200,000 m^{3}) of water and it covers an area of 600 acres (240 ha). Two other auxiliary reservoirs are located adjacent to the lower reservoir and they serve to provide additional water during periods of drought. Auxiliary Pool I is located just north of the lower reservoir and covers an area of 400 acres (160 ha). It is created by four embankment dams. Auxiliary Pool II is located west of the lower reservoir and covers an area of 200 acres (81 ha). It is created by an embankment dam and an outlet structure. Both Auxiliary Pool I and II are normally maintained at 715 feet (218 m), a water level 5 feet (1.5 m) above the lower reservoir. They provide an additional 5,800 acre-feet (7,200,000 m^{3}) of water to the lower reservoir. The Auxiliary Pools are also used to sustain wildlife and provide for recreation.

The upper reservoir and power plant are connected by an 889-foot (271 m) long penstock which splits into three separate penstocks prior to reaching each of the three 365 MW Francis pump-turbine-generators. The difference in elevation between the upper and lower reservoirs affords the power plant a minimum net hydraulic head of 613 feet (187 m).
