= Lake Conasauga (Floyd County, Georgia) =

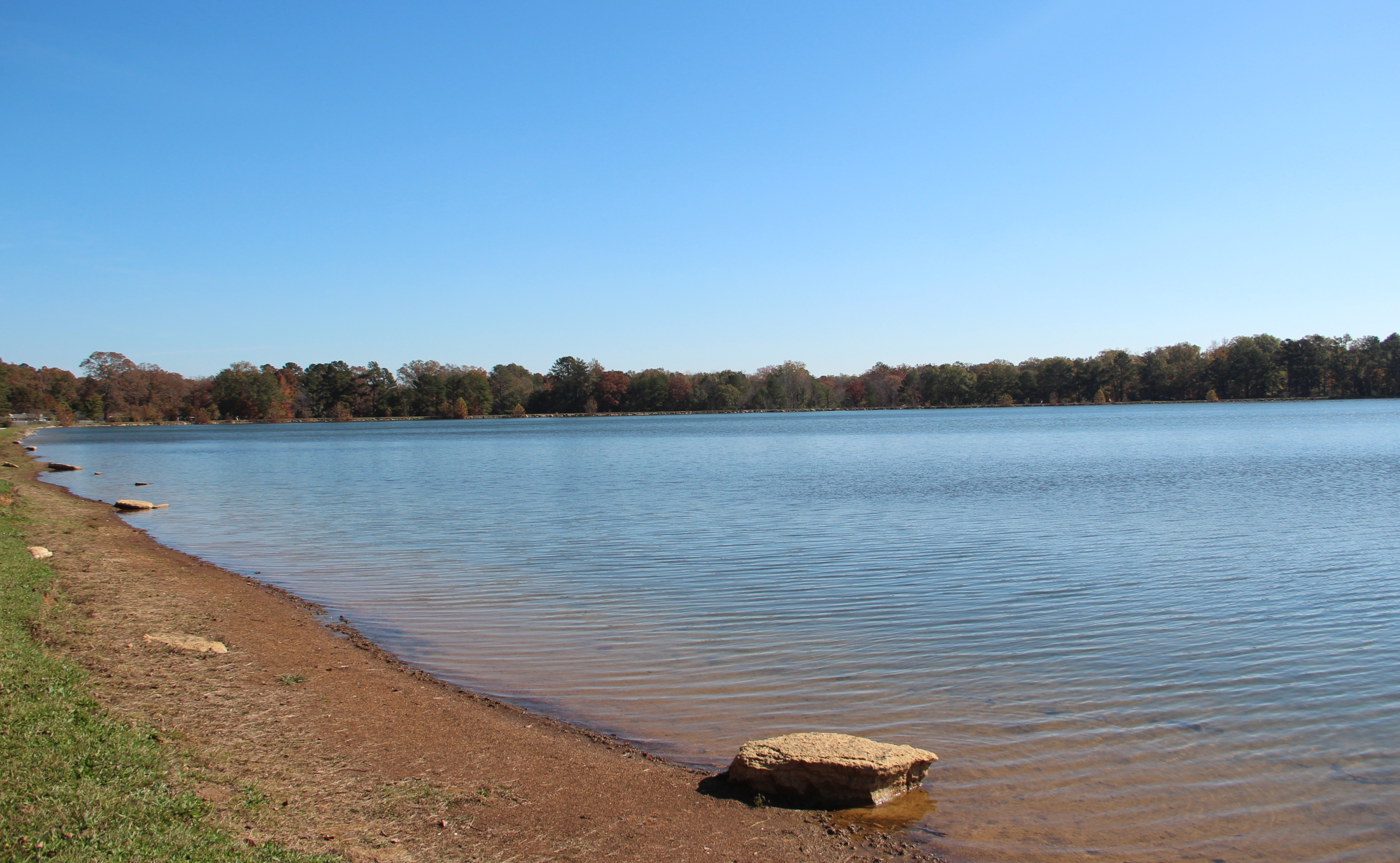
- Lake Conasauga

- Location within Georgia Location within the United States
- Location: Floyd County, Georgia
- Coordinates: 34°17′20″N 85°14′15″W
- Type: reservoir
- Basin countries: United States
- Surface elevation: 633 ft (193 m)

Lake Conasauga is a reservoir in Floyd County, in the U.S. state of Georgia.

The lake was named after deposits of Conasauga shale seen there.

== See also ==
- List of lakes in Georgia (U.S. state)
