= Between the Rivers Historic District =

Historic district in Georgia, United States

- U.S. National Register of Historic Places
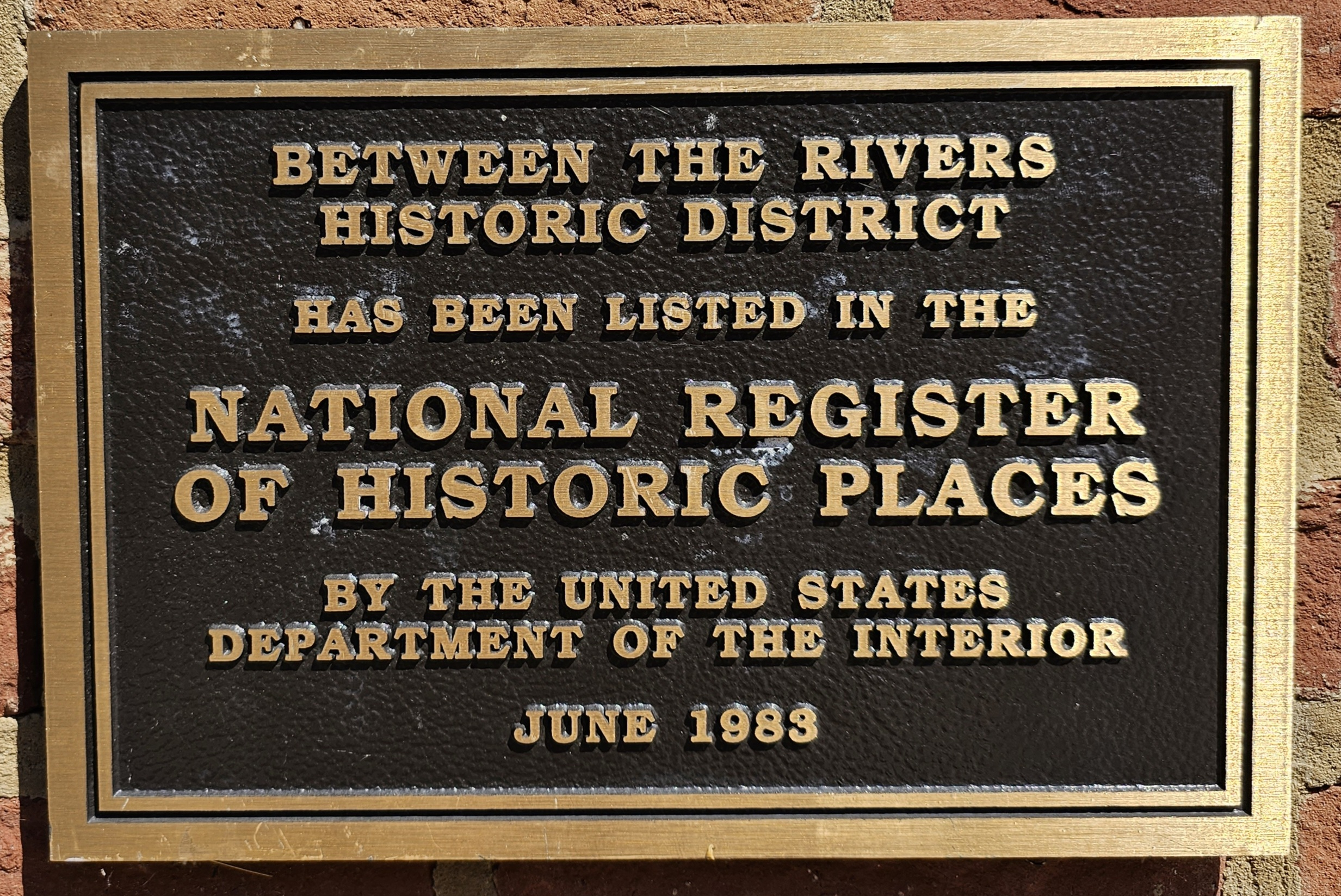
- NRHP marker, affixed to the outside of the Rome Area History Museum

- Location within Georgia
- Location: Roughly bounded by the Etowah and Oostanaula Rivers, and 7th Ave. (original), Rome, Georgia; 107 W. Fourth St. (increase), Rome, Georgia
- Coordinates: 34°15′06″N 85°10′16″W
- Area: 90 acres (36 ha) (original) less than one acre (increase)
- Built by: Multiple
- Architectural style: Late 19th And Early 20th Century American Movements, Late 19th And 20th Century Revivals, Late Victorian
- NRHP reference No.: 83000193 (original); 88003124 (increase)

Significant dates
- Added to NRHP: June 9, 1983
- Boundary increase: January 10, 1989

The Between the Rivers Historic District in Rome, Georgia, USA, is a 90 acres (36 ha) historic district which was listed on the National Register of Historic Places in 1983. The listing included 292 contributing buildings and three contributing structures.

It is a hilly area, with three sides defined by the Etowah River and the Oostanaula River.

Significant buildings in the district include:

- Busy Bee Cafe Building, 224 Broad Street
- Southern Bell Telephone Company Building, 400 Broad Street
- Broad Street Pawn Shop Building, 412 Broad Street
- Montgomery Ward and Company Building, 413-417 Broad Street
- Esserman's Department Store, 425-429 Broad Street
- Maxwell, Quinn, and Garnett Furniture Company, 519 Broad Street
- Greystone Hotel, 10 Second Avenue
- Greystone Apartment Building, 12 Second Avenue
- Tribune Building, 102-104 W. Fourth Avenue
- Union Bus Terminal, 107 W. Fourth Avenue
- Coca-Cola Bottling Company Building, 106-108 W. Fifth Avenue

It also includes the Rome Clock Tower, a water tower with a clock, which was separately listed on the National Register in 1980.

It included two historic bridges: a 1916-1917 solid-arch concrete bridge which brings Broad Street over the Etowah River and a 1930 iron truss bridge which brings Second Avenue over the Ooostanaula River.

A boundary increase in 1989 added one contributing building, the Union Bus Terminal, and provided additional information, including that the Second Avenue bridge had been demolished, around 1983, and replaced.

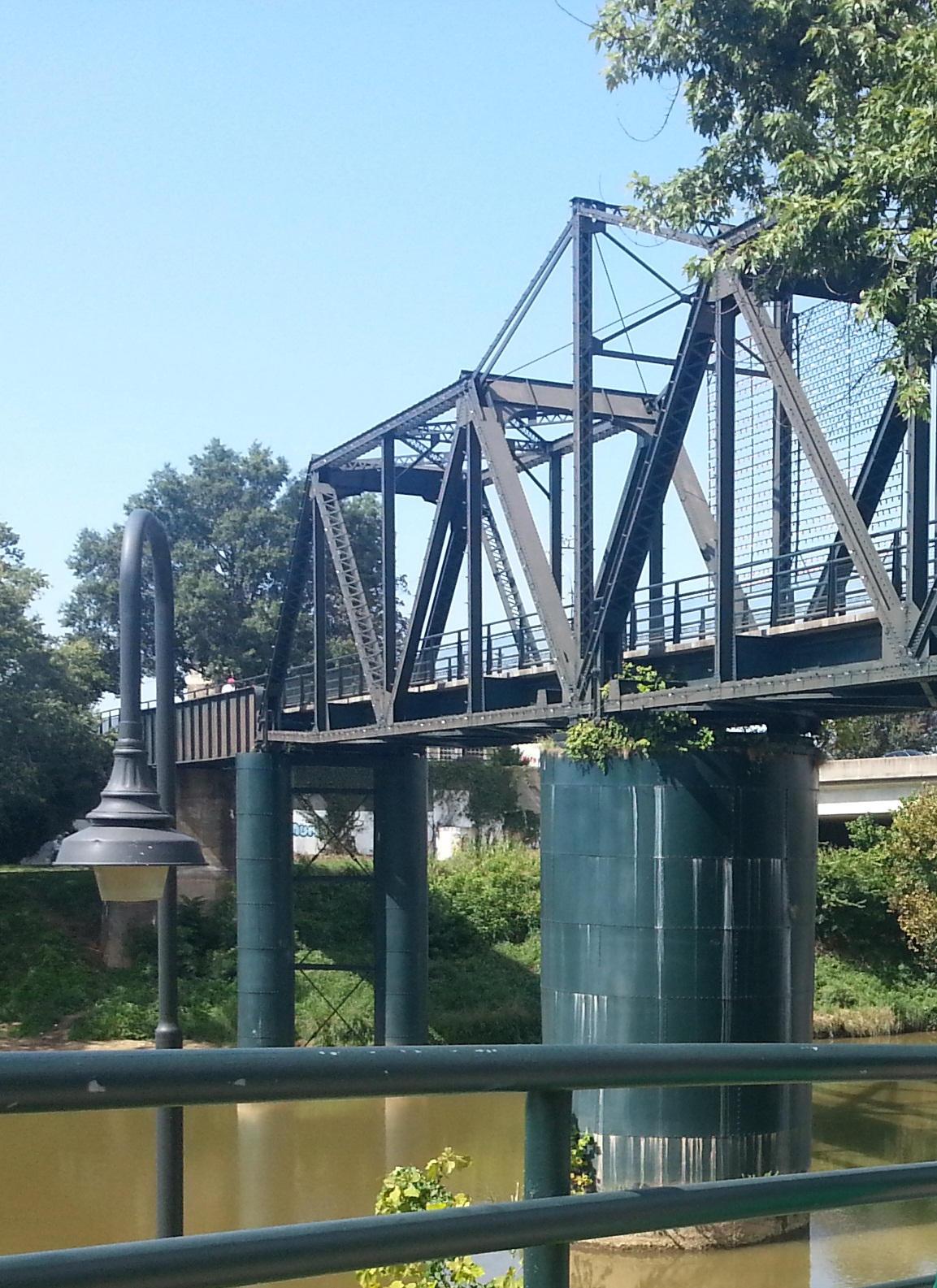
The former Central of Georgia Railway swing bridge over the Oostanaula River, in 2012, now the Robert Redden Foot Bridge, which leads to the district, though not included in the National Register listing
