= East Rome Historic District =

Historic district in Georgia, United States

- U.S. National Register of Historic Places
- Location within Georgia
- Location: Roughly bounded by Walnut Ave., McCall Blvd., E. 8th and 10th Sts., Rome, Georgia
- Coordinates: 34°14′30″N 85°09′53″W
- Area: 60 acres (24 ha)
- Architectural style: Colonial Revival, Bungalow/craftsman, Late Victorian
- NRHP reference No.: 85001637
- Added to NRHP: July 25, 1985

The East Rome Historic District, in Rome, Georgia, is a historic district which was listed on the National Register of Historic Places in 1985. The listing included 112 contributing buildings on 60 acres (24 ha).

The district is mostly residential. It is roughly bounded by Walnut Ave., McCall Blvd., E. 8th and 10th Streets in Rome. It includes a commercial area around the intersection of East 8th and Second Avenue plus the northern end of Maple Avenue. This area includes a two-story brick former fire station, a frame retail building, and some former residences now used commercially. Another small commercial section is on Maple Avenue is by the railroad, around the former site of the depot; it includes brick buildings.

The residential architecture of the district includes Victorian, Queen Anne, Second Empire, Georgian Revival, Bungalow/Craftsman, and Period Styles. One of the most elaborate Victorian ones is the Colonel Hamilton Yancey Residence in the Second Empire style.
