= George Conner House =

Historic house in Kentucky, United States

- U.S. National Register of Historic Places
- Location: Off U.S. Route 150, Fredericktown, Kentucky
- Coordinates: 37°45′35″N 85°20′38″W
- Area: less than one acre
- Built: 1842
- Architectural style: Greek Revival
- MPS: Washington County MRA
- NRHP reference No.: 88003402
- Added to NRHP: February 10, 1989

The George Conner House, located off U.S. Route 150 in Fredericktown, Kentucky, was listed on the National Register of Historic Places in 1989.

It is a Greek Revival-style five-bay two-story brick house built in 1842 with a two-story pedimented portico, one of only two L-shaped historic houses of its era in Washington County.
