= Alexander Conner House =

- U.S. National Register of Historic Places
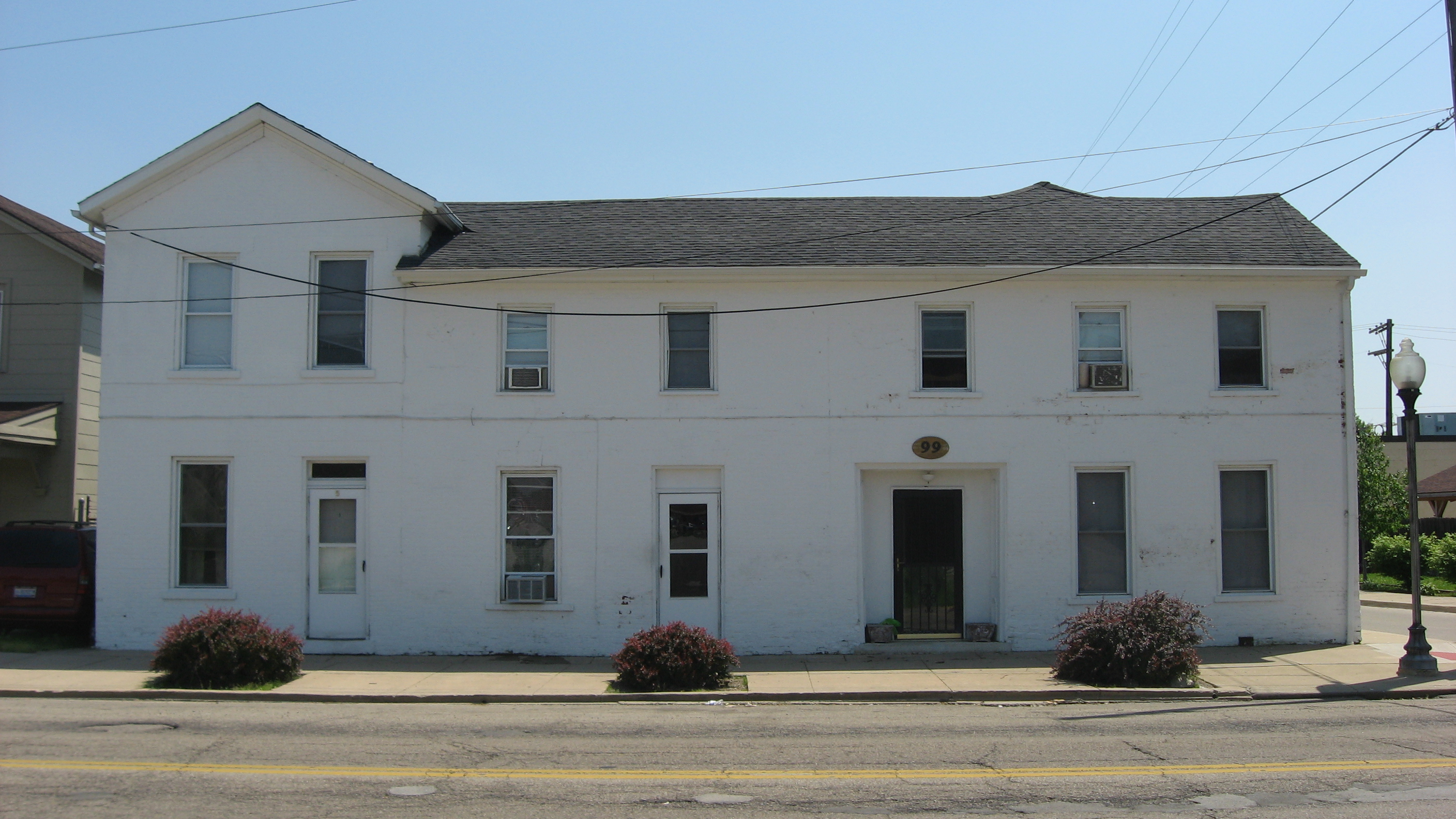
- Front of the house: the eastern end is to the left

- Location within Ohio Location within the United States
- Location: 99 E. Second St., Xenia, Ohio
- Coordinates: 39°41′2″N 83°55′42″W
- Area: Less than 1 acre (0.40 ha)
- Built: 1836
- Architectural style: Greek Revival, Federal
- NRHP reference No.: 87000460
- Added to NRHP: July 28, 1987

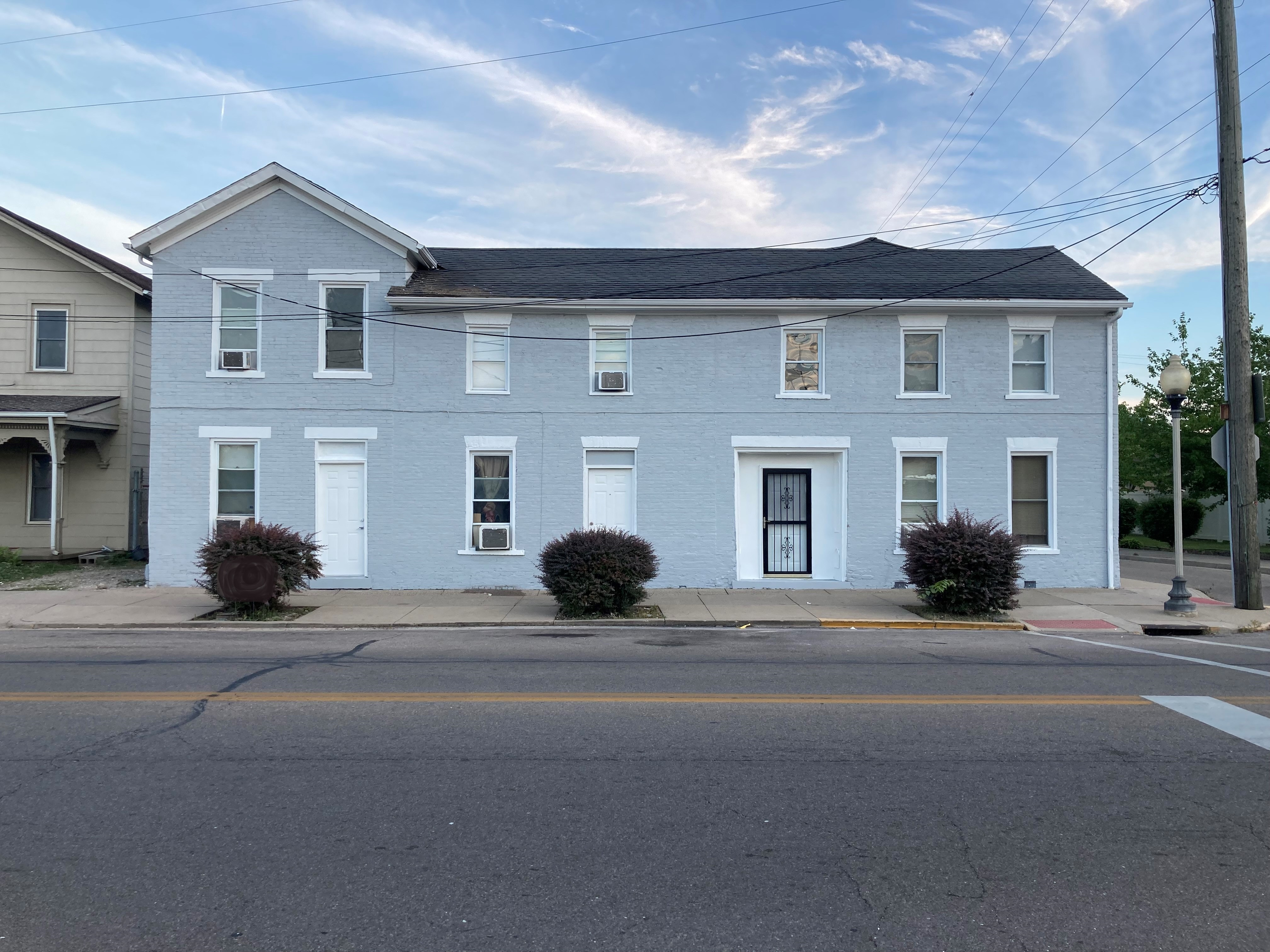
Alexander Conner House in 2024

The Alexander Conner House is a historic rowhouse in Xenia, Ohio, United States. Built in 1836, this two-story brick building is a physical merger of six buildings constructed in the Greek Revival and Federal styles of architecture. It is built in the shape of the letter "U," with three buildings facing the street and two to the rear.

Born in Ireland circa 1790, Alexander Conner emigrated from Ireland to the United States in young adulthood, and he settled in Xenia in 1816. Engaging in business there, he became prosperous enough to purchase a lot southeast of the county courthouse after twenty years of life in the city. On this lot he erected three buildings facing the street; they are the front portions of the present rowhouse. The rear two buildings were completed between that time and his 1865 death, upon which event the rowhouse was sold.

The street-facing portions of the rowhouse are architecturally important to the city of Xenia: although the western and central buildings are Federal and the eastern is Greek Revival, they are together a typical example of housing found in many communities of southwestern Ohio before the Civil War of the 1860s. In Xenia, no other historic rowhouses have survived to the present day, and almost no Federal streetfront houses are still in existence in the city except for the western and central components. In recognition of the importance of the architecture of the rowhouse, it was listed on the National Register of Historic Places on July 28, 1987; only the original three buildings qualified as contributing properties.
