= Conner House =

Historic house in Virginia, United States

- U.S. National Register of Historic Places
- Virginia Landmarks Register
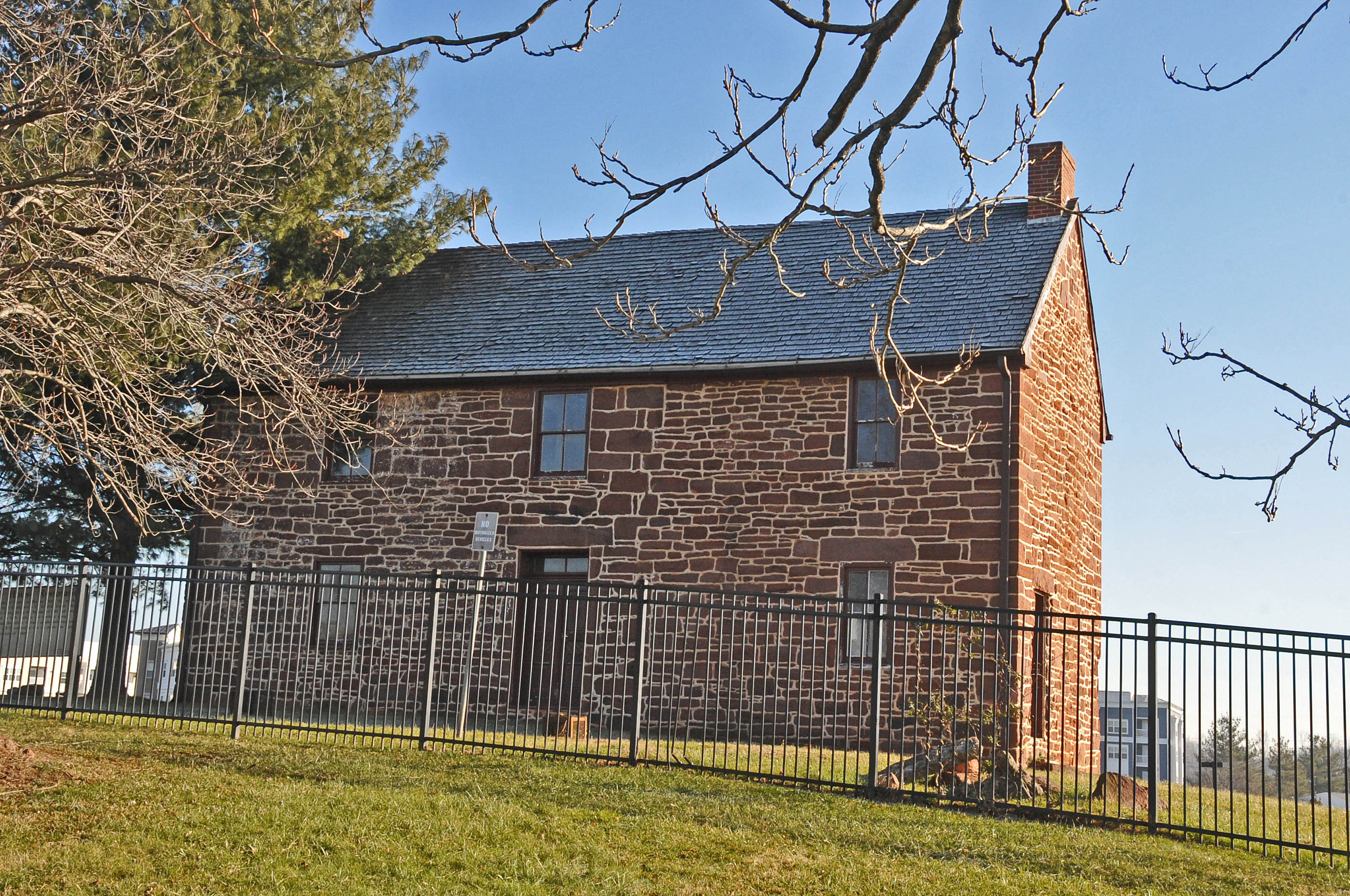

- Location within Northern Virginia Location within Virginia Location within the United States
- Location: Conner Drive, Manassas Park, Virginia
- Coordinates: 38°45′55″N 77°26′44″W
- Area: 1 acre (0.40 ha)
- Built: c. 1810, 1855
- NRHP reference No.: 81000645
- VLR No.: 152-0001

Significant dates
- Added to NRHP: October 6, 1981
- Designated VLR: January 20, 1981

Conner House is a historic house located in Manassas Park, Virginia. The main section was built about 1810, with a later wing added in 1855. It is a two-story, gable-roof, stone residence. The Conner House served from July to November 1861 as the headquarters of General Joseph E. Johnston, commander of the Confederate Army during the first several months of its existence. In 1973 the Town (now City) of Manassas Park purchased the house and yard.

It was added to the National Register of Historic Places in 1981.
