= USS Conasauga =

History

United States
- Name: USS Conasauga
- Namesake: Conasauga River in Georgia
- Ordered: as New York Socony
- Launched: 5 November 1931
- Acquired: 23 March 1943
- Commissioned: 19 April 1943
- Decommissioned: 25 December 1944
- Stricken: date unknown
- Fate: Stripped and hulk sold, 19 December 1945

General characteristics
- Tonnage: 1,540 GRT
- Length: 254 ft (77 m)
- Beam: 45 ft (14 m)
- Draught: 13 ft (4.0 m)
- Speed: 8 knots (15 km/h)
- Armament: one single 3 in (76 mm) dual purpose gun mount, two to four 20 mm guns

USS Conasauga (AOG-15) was a Halawa-class gasoline tanker acquired by the United States Navy for the dangerous task of transporting gasoline to warships in the fleet, and to remote Navy stations.

Conasauga was completed in 1932 as New York Socony by Bethlehem Shipbuilding Corp., Sparrows Point, Maryland; acquired by the Navy 23 March 1943, and commissioned 19 April 1943.

== World War II service ==
Sailing from New York 1 May 1943, Conasauga arrived at Oran 28 May. She was attached to Commander Naval Forces, North African Waters, and carried gasoline to various ports in the Mediterranean.

== Decommissioning ==
Conasauga was decommissioned and transferred to France under lend lease 25 December 1944. The name was Lac Blanc. She was returned 17 October 1945 at Palermo, and her equipment was salvaged and her hulk sold 19 December 1945.
