= Old Brick Mill =

Historic grist mill in the US state of Georgia

- U.S. National Register of Historic Places
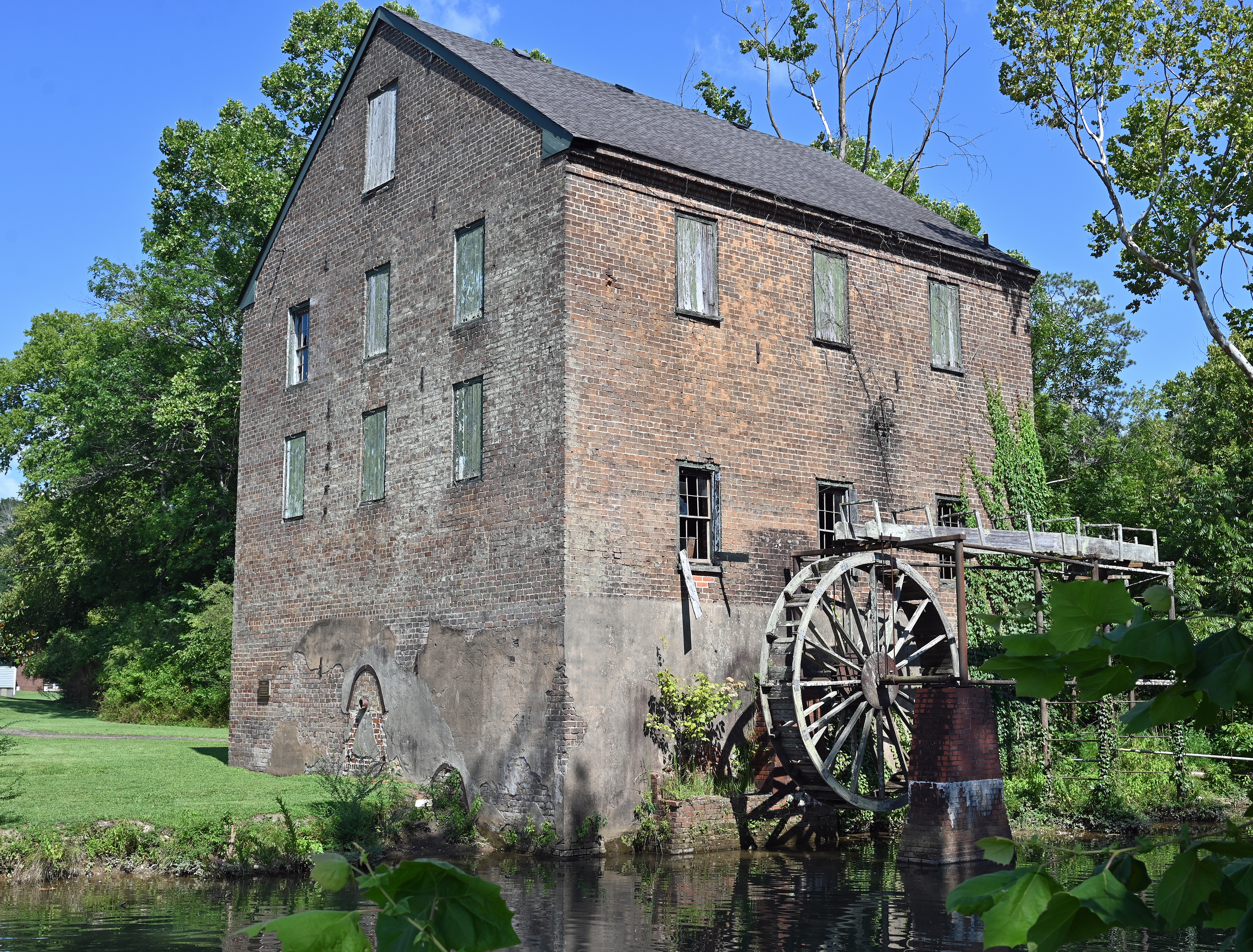

- Location within Georgia Location within the United States
- Location: Park Street, Lindale, Georgia
- Coordinates: 34.18854°N 85.17437°W
- Built: 1830s
- NRHP reference No.: 93000936
- Added to NRHP: September 9, 1993

The Old Brick Mill is a historic grist mill built in Lindale, Georgia, US in the 1830s. It has also been called the Jones Mill, the Hoss Mill, The Silver Creek Mill, and the Folly Mill. It was built by enslaved people and is one of only a few surviving antebellum mills in Georgia. It operated as a mill until the 1890s and has had several uses since then. It was added to the National Register of Historic Places in 1993.
