= Rocky Mountain Project =

Coordinates: 34.3659°N 85.3043°W

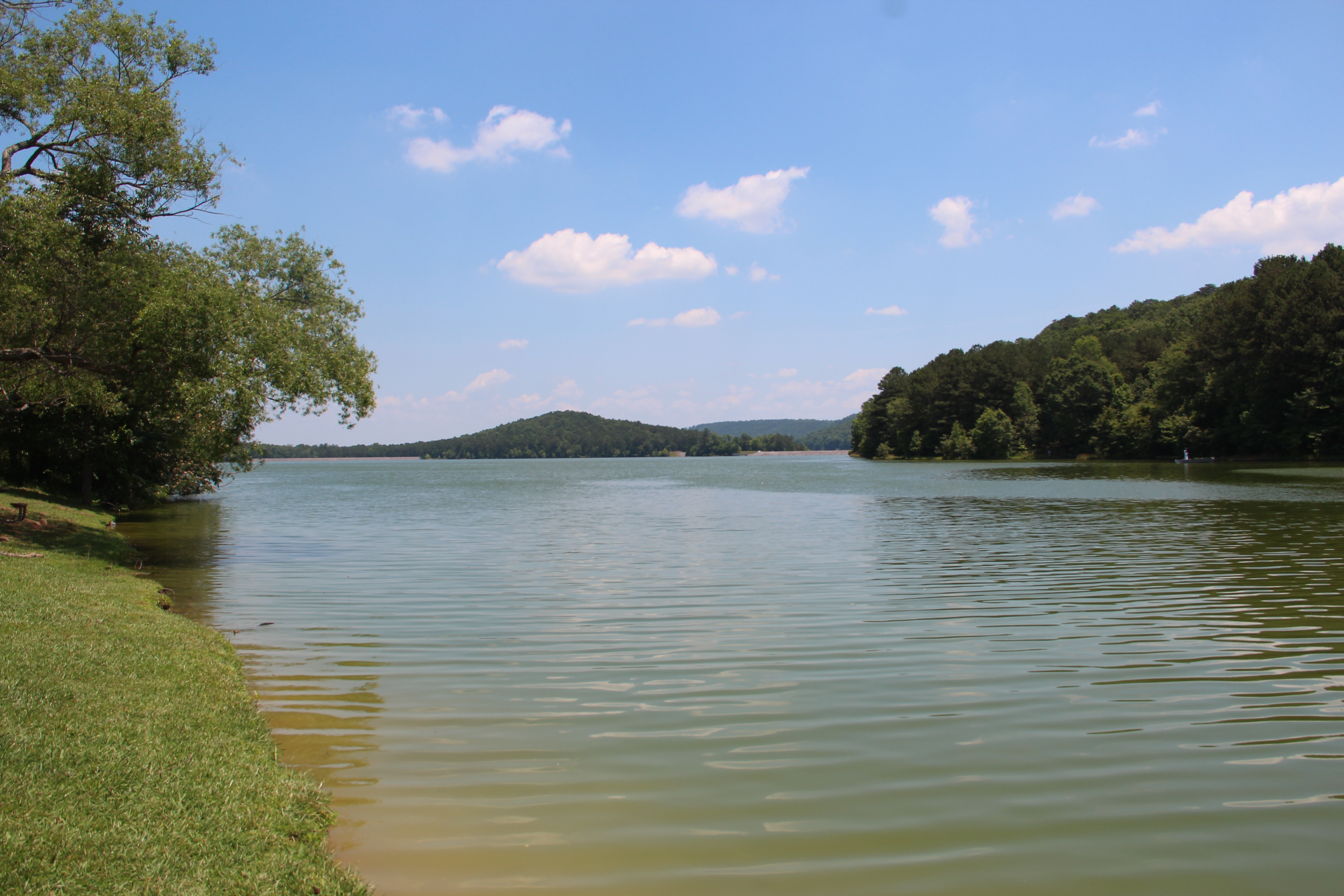
Antioch Lake

The Rocky Mountain Project is a recreational area, including areas for fishing, swimming, and camping, located outside the city of Rome, Georgia, United States. It is compiled of two man-made lakes, totaling 559 acres (2.26 km^{2}): Heath Lake and Antioch Lake. It is owned by Oglethorpe Power Corporation, and co-owned by Georgia Power. The Rocky Mountain Project recreational area is managed by the Georgia Department of Natural Resources, Wildlife Resources Division and funded by Oglethorpe Power.

== History ==
It's named based on the Rocky Mountain Hydroelectric Plant that in turn created the recreation area. In the late 1970s Georgia Power purchased the land then known as Rock Mountain, from Berry College. It is said that if seen from an aerial view, Rock Mountain looked like a bowl, thus making it perfect for a hydroelectric plant. 15 years later, the massive hydroelectric facilities and recreation areas were completed, and opened to the public.

== Heath Lake ==
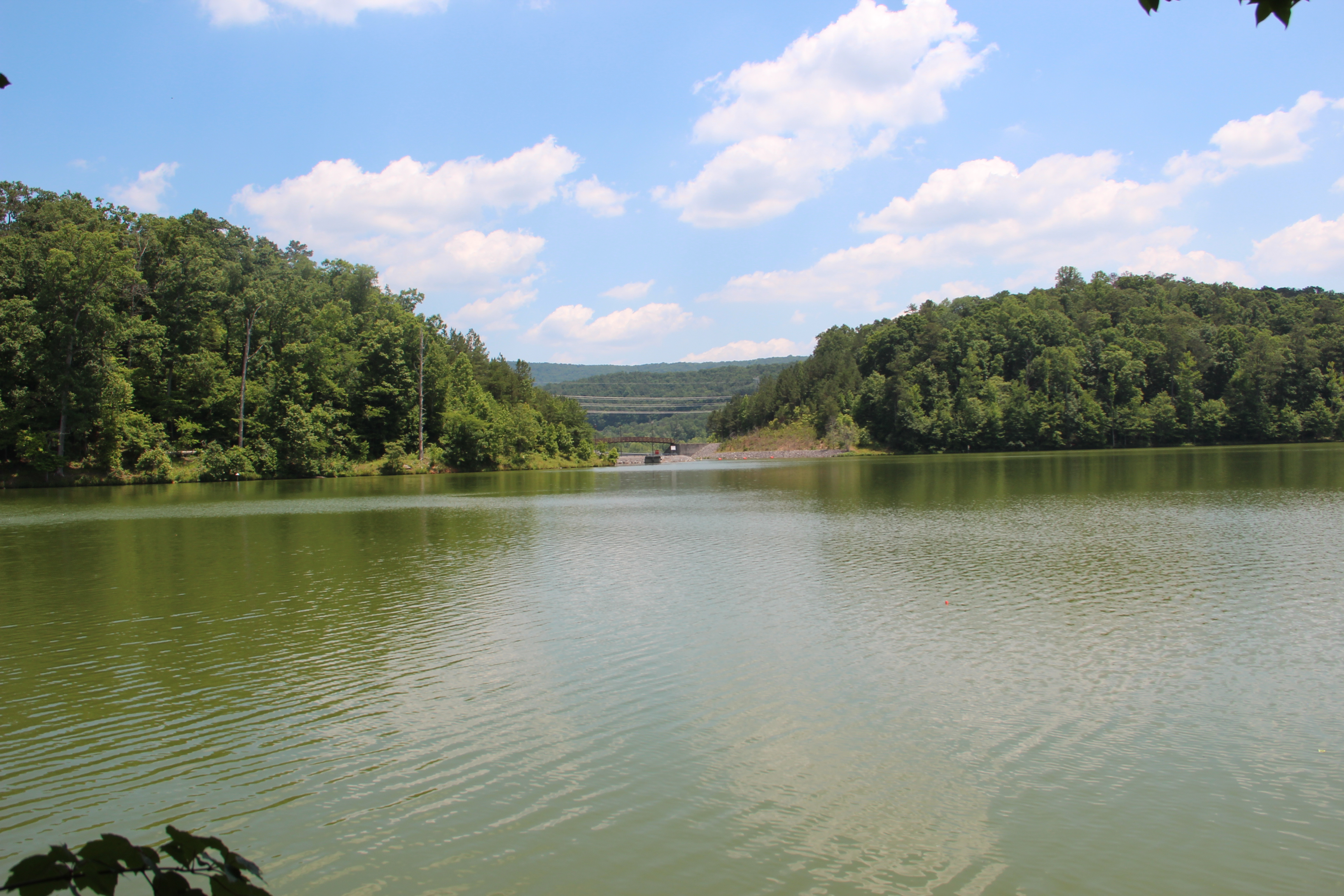
Heath Lake

Commonly called "Trophy Lake," Heath Lake is the main fishing lake at Rocky Mountain Project, and covers 202 acres (0.82 km^{2}). Some common fish in the lake include: Largemouth bass, Bluegill, Crappie, Channel Catfish, Redear Sunfish, and Hybrid White Striped Bass.

== Antioch Lake ==
The larger of the two lakes, Lake Antioch covers 357 acres (1.44 km^{2}). It also includes a man made "beach." Like Heath Lake, fishing is very common in Antioch Lake.
