= Floyd County Administration Building =

Historic courthouse and post office in Georgia, US

- U.S. Post Office and Courthouse
- U.S. National Register of Historic Places
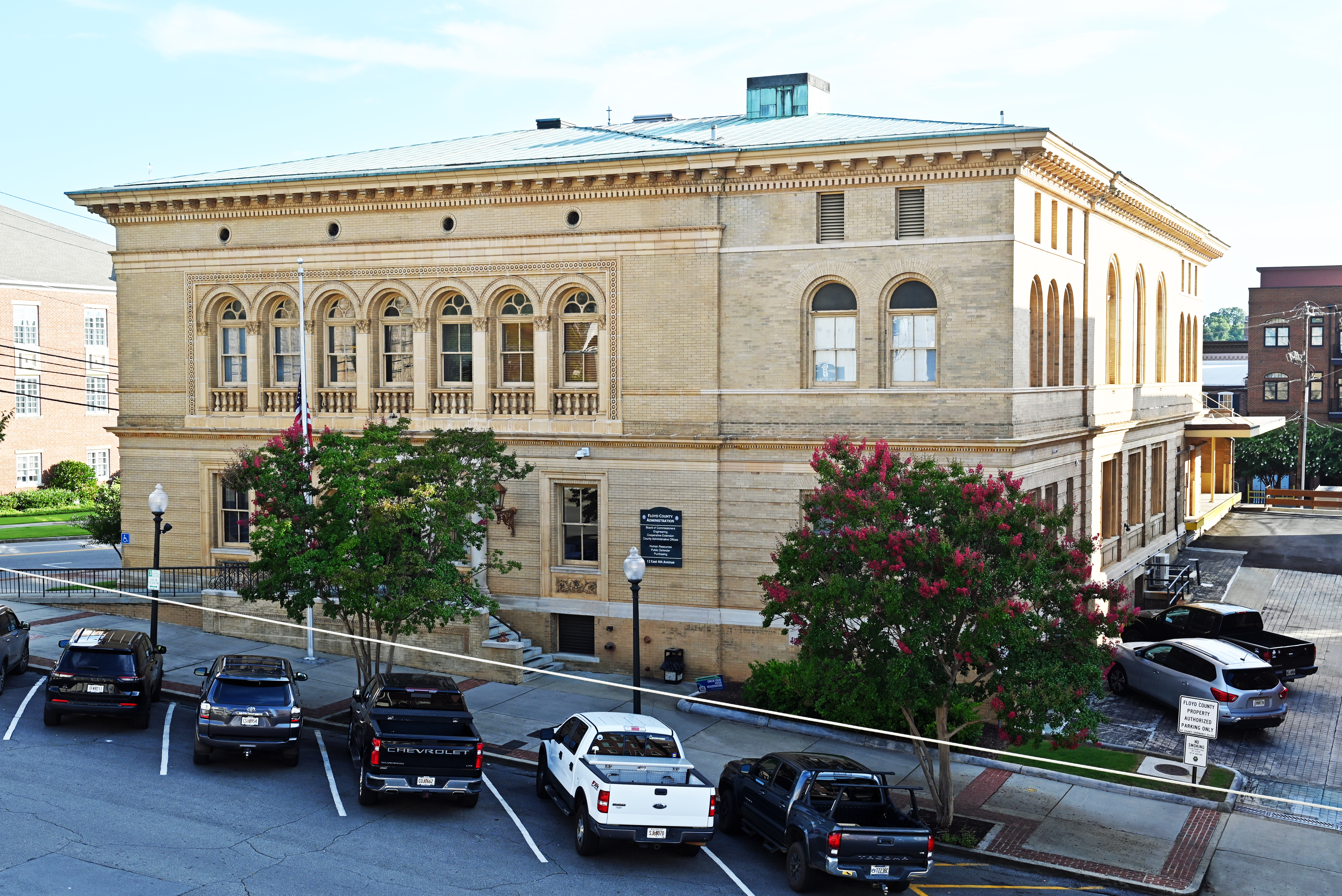

- Location within Georgia Location within the United States
- Interactive map showing the location of Floyd County Administration Building
- Location: W. 4th Ave. and E. 1st St., Rome, Georgia
- Coordinates: 34.25377°N 85.17141°W
- Area: 0.6 acres (0.24 ha)
- Built: 1896, 1904, 1911, 1941
- Architectural style: Second Renaissance Revival
- NRHP reference No.: 75000592
- Added to NRHP: May 6, 1975

The Floyd County Administration Building at Fourth Avenue and East First Street in Rome, Georgia was built in 1896 and extended in 1904, 1911, and 1941. It was formerly known as the U.S. Post Office and Courthouse and has also been known as the Federal Building and Post Office. Its exterior reflects Second Renaissance Revival styling. In 1975 its first floor had a large workroom area for the post office. The second floor had the courtroom (open above through the third floor level) plus offices of the judge and clerk. The third floor, under a low-angle roof, had room for some offices and was otherwise attic space. It was listed on the National Register of Historic Places in 1975 as "U.S. Post Office and Courthouse" for its architecture, at a time when the building was vacant and awaiting adaptive reuse.

The 1975 nomination to the NRHP was written by an architectural historian of Atlanta, Elizabeth Z. Macgregor. She named no original or subsequent architect to be credited, but she knowledgeably described the building in some detail as quite a competent work, finding it:

significant architecturally as an example of the Second Renaissance Revival style structure. In the Rome area this is the only building designed in this style. / From a strict sense the U. S. Post Office and Courthouse is a combination of details of decorative relief work reflective of the earlier nineteenth century Renaissance Revival Italian Mode; however the general effect is a well coordinated horizontal design that has obvious influences from the later Second Renaissance Revival.

Postcard views from c. 1908 and from the 1940s shows views. It was purchased by the Floyd County Board of Commissioners in 1975.

It serves now as the County Administration Building, at 12 East First Street. The Commissioners Meeting Room, on the second floor, is presumably the old courtroom space.

The current Federal Building in Rome is at 600 East First Street. It includes a U.S.P.S. facility (the Martha Berry Post Office), a United States Bankruptcy Court, and more.

== See also ==
- List of United States post offices
