= Wesley O. Conner House =

Historic house in the US state of Georgia

- U.S. National Register of Historic Places
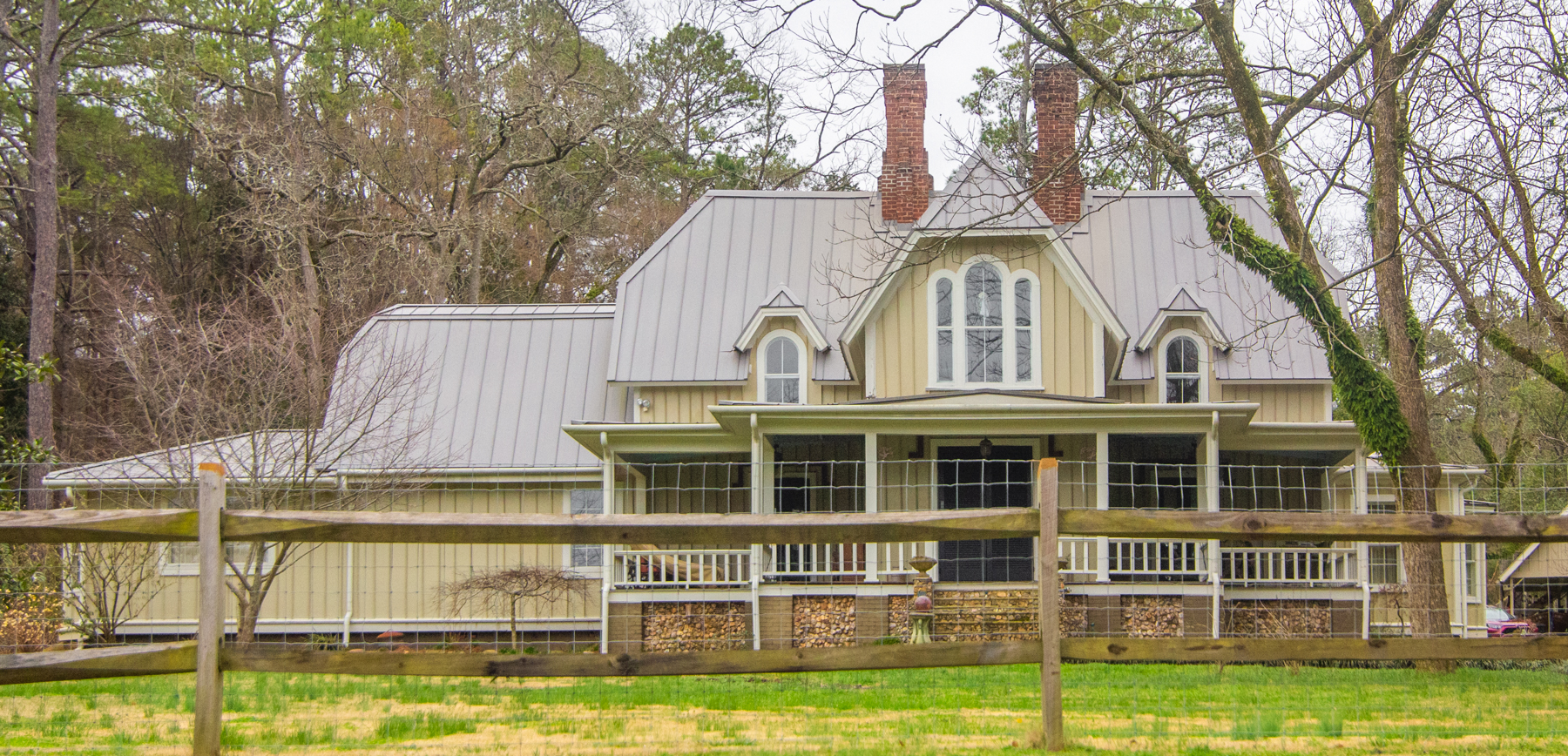

- Location within Georgia
- Location: Cedartown St., Cave Spring, Georgia
- Coordinates: 34°06′00″N 85°19′51″W
- Area: 41 acres (17 ha)
- Built: 1869
- Architectural style: Classical Revival, Late Gothic Revival
- MPS: Cave Spring MRA
- NRHP reference No.: 80001037
- Added to NRHP: June 19, 1980

The Wesley O. Conner House, on Cedartown St. in Cave Spring, Georgia, was built in 1869 by Wesley O. Connor, the Superintendent of the Georgia School for the Deaf. It was listed on the National Register of Historic Places in 1980.

It is a one-and-a-half-story wood frame Gothic/Romanesque Revival-style farmhouse. It has a jerkin-headed gable roof, two tall interior chimneys, dormers and a porch. It has board-and-batten siding, and a seamed-metal roof.

It was deemed significant at the state-wide level "as an unusual example of mid-19th-century eclectic residential architecture, combining features of the Gothic and Greek Revival styles. Its overall form, proportions, arrangement, materials, and details are:generally Gothic Revival; its roundarched windows are clearly Romanesque. Both styles are relatively rare in Georgia, although the Gothic Revival is well represented in Cave Spring, and their successful integration in one .building is extraordinary. This design reflects the carpenter/builder architectural tradition where design originates from the combination of experience, pattern books, and the latest fashions."
