= Coosa, Georgia =

- Unincorporated community
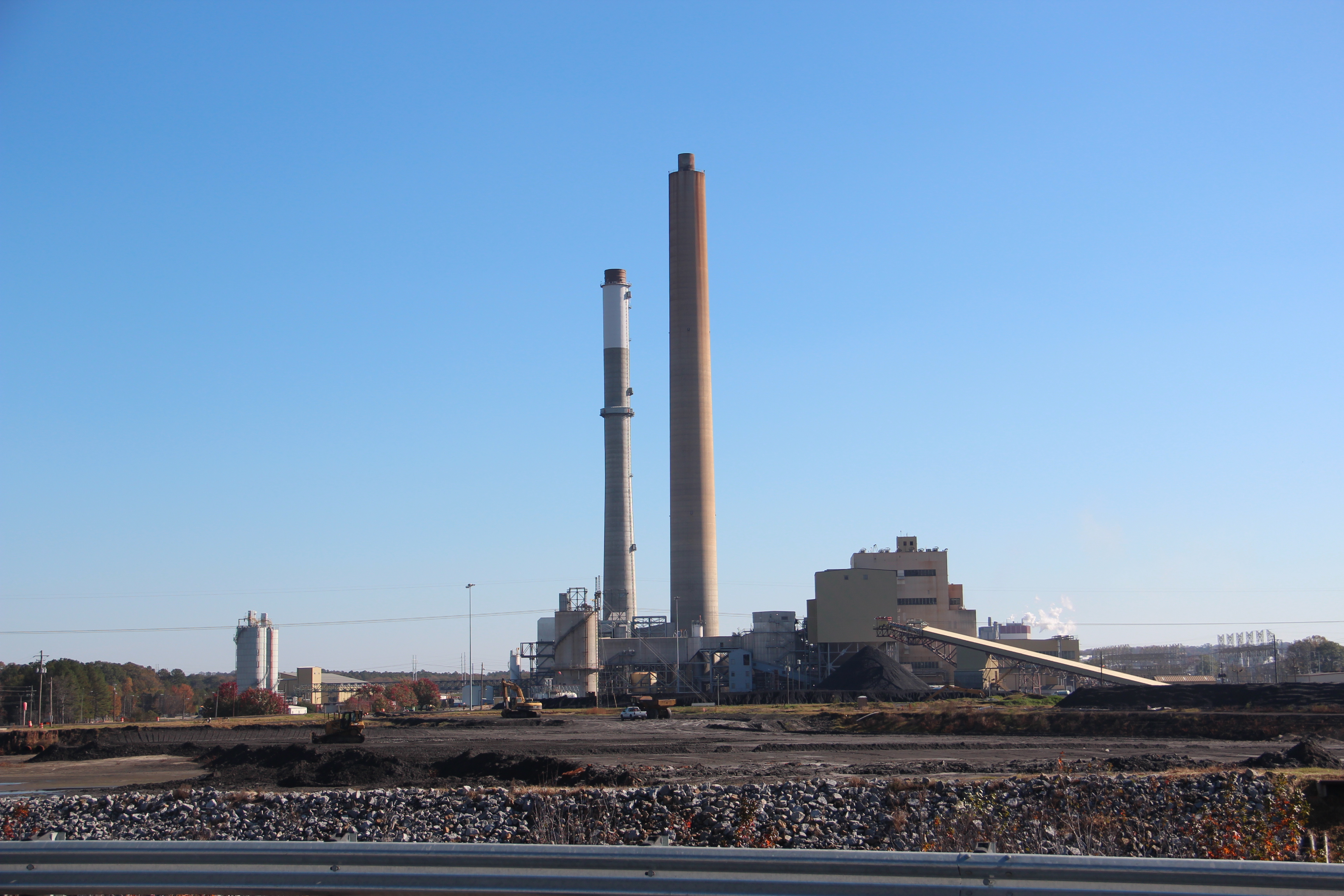
- Plant Hammond, a coal-fired power plant in Coosa

- Location within Georgia
- Coordinates: 34°15′16″N 85°21′16″W
- Country: United States
- State: Georgia
- County: Floyd
- Elevation: 594 ft (181 m)
- Time zone: UTC-5 (Eastern (EST))
  - Summer (DST): UTC-4 (EDT)
- ZIP code: 30129
- Area codes: 770, 678, 470
- GNIS feature ID: 355297

Coosa is an unincorporated community in Floyd County, Georgia, United States. The community is located at the intersection of Georgia routes 20 and 100, north of the Coosa River, 11 miles (18 km) west of Rome. Coosa has a post office with ZIP code 30129, which opened on December 28, 1846. An early variant name was "Missionary Station".
