= Floyd County, Georgia =

County in Georgia, United States

- County
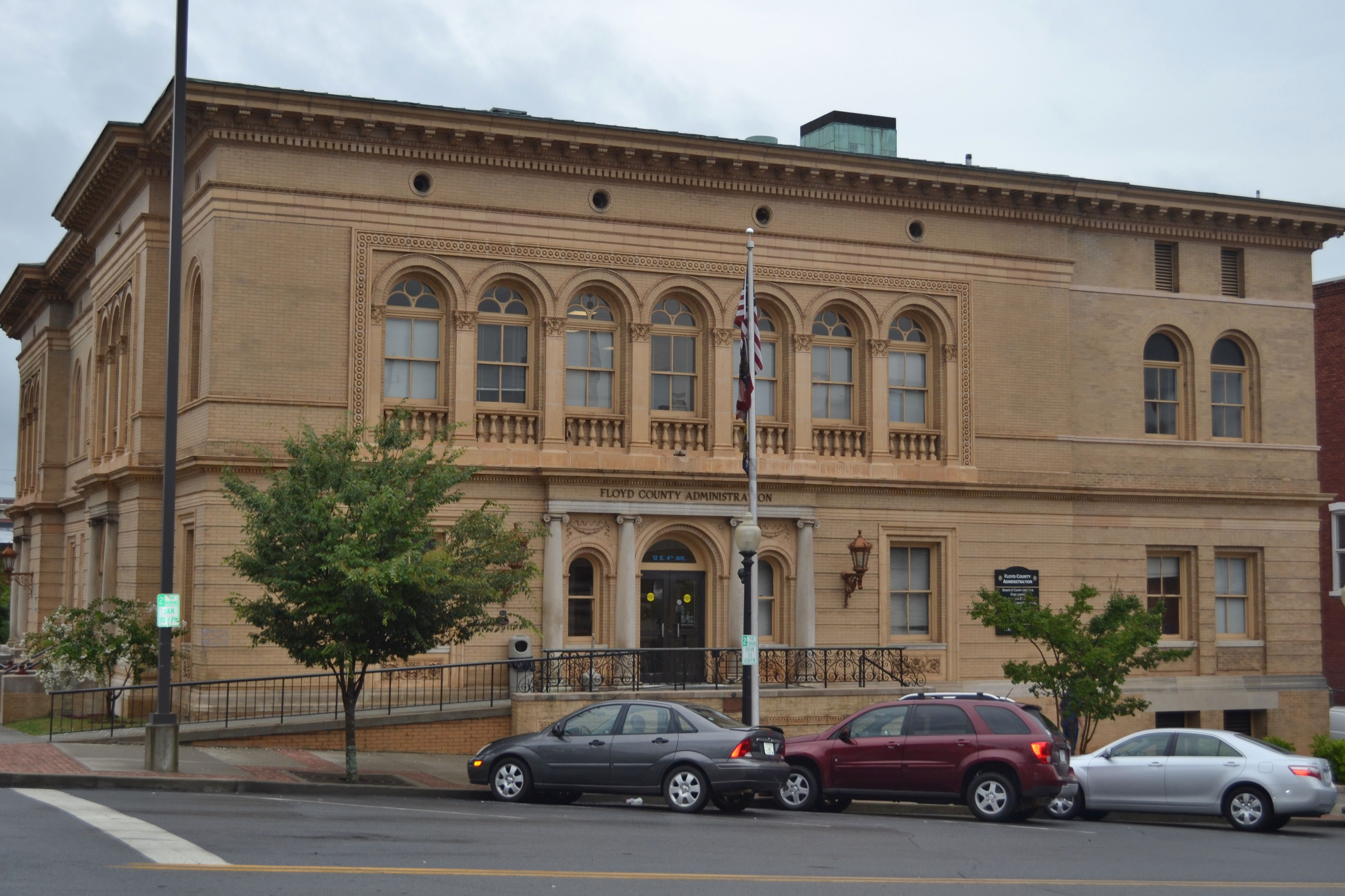
- Floyd County Administration Building

- Flag Seal

- Location within the U.S. state of Georgia
- Coordinates: 34°16′N 85°13′W
- Country: United States
- State: Georgia
- Founded: December 3, 1832; 193 years ago
- Named for: John Floyd
- Seat: Rome
- Largest city: Rome

Area
  - Total: 518 sq mi (1,340 km^{2})
  - Land: 510 sq mi (1,300 km^{2})
  - Water: 8.6 sq mi (22 km^{2}) 1.7%

Population (2020)
  - Total: 98,584
  - Estimate (2025): 101,378 ▲
  - Density: 190/sq mi (75/km^{2})
- Time zone: UTC−5 (Eastern)
  - Summer (DST): UTC−4 (EDT)
- Congressional district: 14th
- Website: floydcountyga.gov

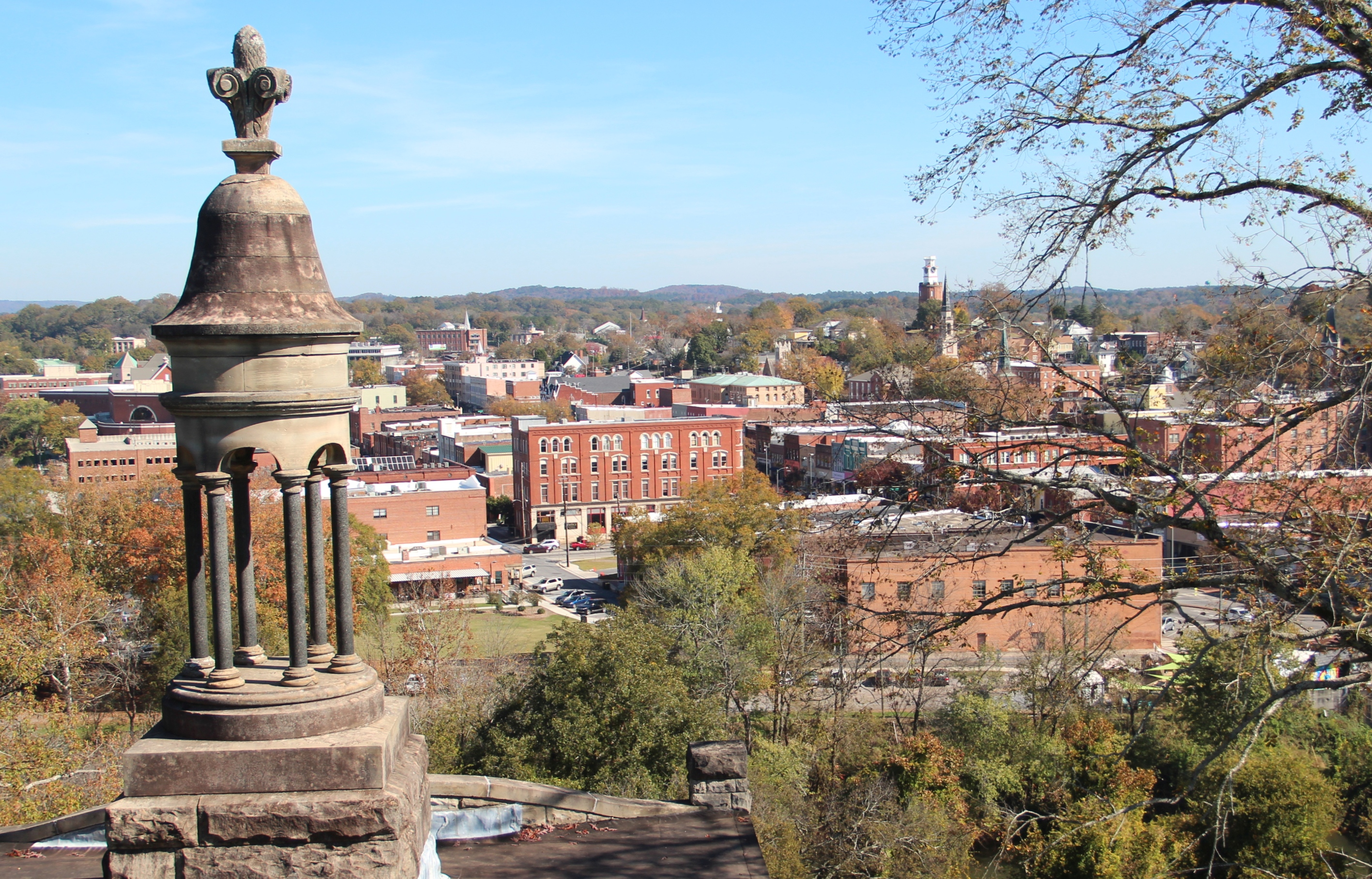
Rome metropolitan area, Georgia

Floyd County is a county in the Northwest region of the U.S. state of Georgia. As of the 2020 United States census, the population was 98,584. The county seat is Rome. Floyd County comprises the Rome metropolitan statistical area.

== History ==
The county was established on December 3, 1832, by an act of the Georgia General Assembly, and was created from land that was part of Cherokee County at the time. The county is named after United States Congressman John Floyd.

== Geography ==
According to the U.S. Census Bureau, the county has a total area of 518 square miles (1,340 km^{2}), of which 510 sq mi (1,300 km^{2}) are land and 8.6 sq mi (22 km^{2}) (1.7%) are covered by water.

The northern third of Floyd County is located in the Oostanaula River sub-basin of the ACT River Basin (Coosa-Tallapoosa River Basin). The eastern third of the county is located in the Etowah River sub-basin of the larger ACT River Basin, while the western third of Floyd County is located in the Upper Coosa River sub-basin of the same ACT River Basin.

=== Lakes and reservoirs ===
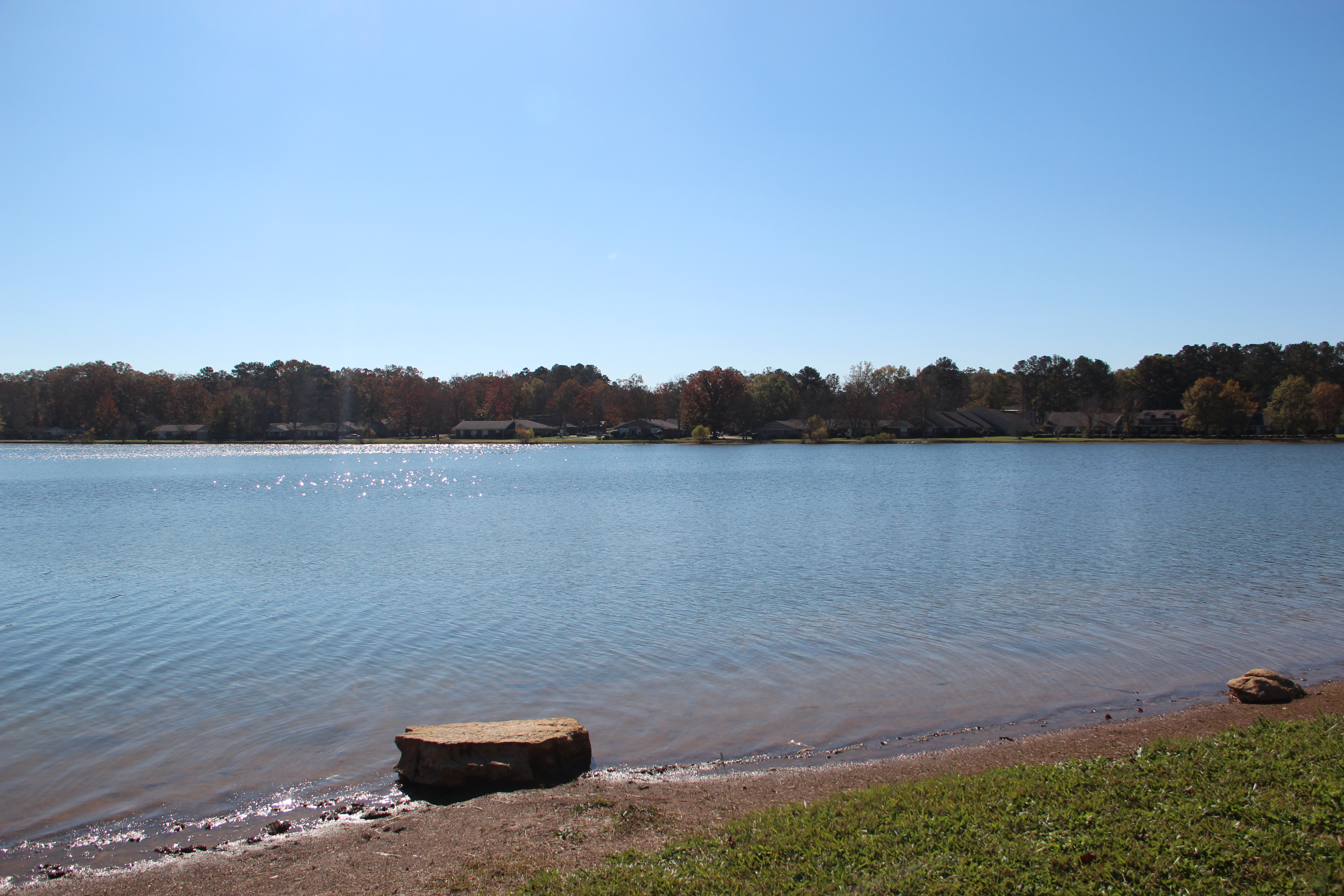
Lake Conasauga

- Antioch Lake
- Lake Conasauga
- DeSoto Lake
- Heath Lake
- Lake Marvin
- Powers Lake
- Weiss Lake

=== Adjacent counties ===
- Walker County – north
- Gordon County – northeast
- Bartow County – east
- Polk County – south
- Cherokee County, Alabama – west (CST)
- Chattooga County – northwest

=== National protected area ===
- Chattahoochee National Forest (part)

== Transportation ==
=== Major highways ===
- US 27 / SR 1
  - SR 1 Loop (Rome)
- US 411
- SR 20
- SR 53
- SR 100
- SR 101
- SR 140
- SR 156
- SR 293 (former US 411/SR 20)

=== Pedestrians and cycling ===
- Heritage Trail System
- Kingfisher Trail
- Silver Creek Trail
- Simms Mountain Trail
- Snow Loop
- The Goat
- Thornwood Trail
- Viking Trail

== Demographics ==
Historical population
Census	Pop.	Note	%±
1840	4,441		—
1850	8,205		84.8%
1860	15,195		85.2%
1870	17,230		13.4%
1880	24,418		41.7%
1890	28,391		16.3%
1900	33,113		16.6%
1910	36,736		10.9%
1920	39,841		8.5%
1930	48,667		22.2%
1940	56,141		15.4%
1950	62,899		12.0%
1960	69,130		9.9%
1970	73,742		6.7%
1980	79,800		8.2%
1990	81,251		1.8%
2000	90,565		11.5%
2010	96,317		6.4%
2020	98,584		2.4%
2025 (est.)	101,378	▲	2.8%
U.S. Decennial Census; 1790-1880 1890-1910; 1920-1930 1930-1940; 1940-1950 1960-1980; 1980-2000 2010 2020

A July 1, 2009 estimate placed the population at 96,250.

=== Racial and ethnic composition ===
Floyd County, Georgia – racial and ethnic composition Note: the US Census treats Hispanic/Latino as an ethnic category. This table excludes Latinos from the racial categories and assigns them to a separate category. Hispanics/Latinos may be of any race.
Race / ethnicity (NH = Non-Hispanic)	Pop 1980	Pop 1990	Pop 2000	Pop 2010	Pop 2020	% 1980	% 1990	% 2000	% 2010	% 2020
White alone (NH)	68,810	68,858	71,674	70,959	67,747	86.23%	84.75%	79.14%	73.67%	68.72%
Black or African American alone (NH)	10,141	11,027	11,984	13,494	13,940	12.71%	13.57%	13.23%	14.01%	14.14%
Native American or Alaska Native alone (NH)	52	128	204	194	191	0.07%	0.16%	0.23%	0.20%	0.19%
Asian alone (NH)	211	400	834	1,225	1,287	0.26%	0.49%	0.92%	1.27%	1.31%
Native Hawaiian or Pacific Islander alone (NH)	x	x	43	56	24	x	x	0.05%	0.06%	0.02%
Other race alone (NH)	41	7	63	108	371	0.05%	0.01%	0.07%	0.11%	0.38%
Mixed-race or multiracial (NH)	x	x	780	1,294	3,558	x	x	0.86%	1.34%	3.61%
Hispanic or Latino (any race)	545	831	4,983	8,987	11,466	0.68%	1.02%	5.50%	9.33%	11.63%
Total	79,800	81,251	90,565	96,317	98,584	100.00%	100.00%	100.00%	100.00%	100.00%

=== 2020 census ===
As of the 2020 census, there were 98,584 people, 36,883 households, and 23,561 families residing in the county. The median age was 38.6 years; 22.6% of residents were under the age of 18 and 17.4% were 65 years of age or older, while for every 100 females there were 95.3 males and for every 100 females age 18 and over there were 92.6 males.

61.3% of residents lived in urban areas, while 38.7% lived in rural areas.

The racial makeup of the county was 70.5% White, 14.3% Black or African American, 0.7% American Indian and Alaska Native, 1.3% Asian, 0.0% Native Hawaiian and Pacific Islander, 5.9% from some other race, and 7.3% from two or more races. Hispanic or Latino residents of any race comprised 11.6% of the population.

Of the 36,883 households, 31.2% had children under the age of 18 living with them and 29.3% had a female householder with no spouse or partner present. About 27.0% of all households were made up of individuals and 12.1% had someone living alone who was 65 years of age or older.

There were 40,475 housing units, of which 8.9% were vacant. Among occupied housing units, 61.6% were owner-occupied and 38.4% were renter-occupied. The homeowner vacancy rate was 1.7% and the rental vacancy rate was 6.4%.

=== 2010 census ===
As of the 2010 United States census, 96,317 people, 35,930 households, and 24,916 families were living in the county. The population density was 188.9 inhabitants per square mile (72.9/km^{2}). The 40,551 housing units had an average density of 79.5 units per square mile (30.7 units/km^{2}). The racial makeup of the county was 76.9% White, 14.2% African American, 1.3% Asian, 0.4% American Indian, 0.1% Pacific Islander, 5.3% from other races, and 1.9% from two or more races. Those of Hispanic or Latino origin made up 9.3% of the population. In terms of ancestry, 16.2% were English, 13.3% were American, 12.4% were Irish, and 6.8% were German.

Of the 35,930 households, 34.4% had children under the age of 18 living with them, 49.4% were married couples living together, 14.8% had a female householder with no husband present, 30.7% were not families; 26.0% of all households were made up of individuals. The average household size was 2.58, and the average family size was 3.09. The median age was 37.6 years.

The median income for a household in the county was $41,066, and for a family was $49,310. Males had a median income of $40,269 versus $29,587 for females. The per capita income for the county was $20,640. About 13.3% of families and 18.7% of the population were below the poverty line, including 26.5% of those under age 18 and 11.0% of those age 65 or over.

=== 2000 census ===
As of the 2000 United States census, 90,565 people, 34,028 households, and 24,227 were families living in the county. The population density was 176 people per square mile (68 people/km^{2}). The 36,615 housing units averaged 71 units per square mile (27 units/km^{2}). The racial makeup of the county was 81.34% White, 13.31% African American, 0.31% Native American, 0.93% Asian, 0.09% Pacific Islander, 2.88% from other races, and 1.14% from two or more races. About 5.50% of the population was Hispanic or Latino of any race.

Of the 34,028 households, 32.10% had children under the age of 18 living with them, 53.60% were married couples living together, 13.00% had a female householder with no husband present, and 28.80% were non-families. 24.50% of all households were made up of individuals, and 10.80% had someone living alone who was 65 years of age or older. The average household size was 2.55, and the average family size was 3.02.

In the county, the population was distributed as 24.60% under the age of 18, 10.80% from 18 to 24, 28.50% from 25 to 44, 22.20% from 45 to 64, and 13.90% who were 65 years of age or older. The median age was 36 years. For every 100 females, there were 93.80 males. For every 100 females age 18 and over, there were 90.30 males.

The median income for a household in the county was $35,615, and for a family was $42,302. Males had a median income of $31,659 versus $23,244 for females. The per capita income for the county was $17,808. About 10.80% of families and 14.40% of the population were below the poverty line, including 19.40% of those under age 18 and 13.80% of those age 65 or over.

== Government ==
The county government is housed in the Floyd County Administration Building in Rome, Georgia, the county seat. This was the former US Post Office and Courthouse.

The county has a council-manager form of government, with five county council members elected at-large. Two members are elected as representatives of the city of Rome and must reside there; the other three are elected from the county as residents outside the city limits. The at-large voting tends to reward candidates who can muster majority votes from across the whole county, which requires more money and organization for campaigns. The council hires a professional county manager to manage daily operations.

== Politics ==
Like most rural counties, Floyd County is a Republican stronghold. It has not voted for a Democrat since Georgian Jimmy Carter last ran in 1980. Southerner Bill Clinton was the last Democratic candidate to reach 40% of the vote, off the back of Ross Perot's third party support splitting Republican voters. Floyd County voted 70% for Donald Trump in 2024.

For elections to the United States House of Representatives, Floyd County is part of Georgia's 14th congressional district, currently represented by Clay Fuller. For elections to the Georgia State Senate, Floyd County is covered by District 52 and District 53. For elections to the Georgia House of Representatives, Floyd County is divided by districts 5, 12 and 13.

United States presidential election results for Floyd County, Georgia
Year	Republican		Democratic		Third party(ies)	
Year	No.	%	No.	%	No.	%
1912	63	2.77%	1,838	80.79%	374	16.44%
1916	50	1.94%	2,137	83.05%	386	15.00%
1920	667	25.75%	1,923	74.25%	0	0.00%
1924	470	18.05%	1,922	73.81%	212	8.14%
1928	1,730	53.66%	1,494	46.34%	0	0.00%
1932	300	6.42%	4,342	92.94%	30	0.64%
1936	612	10.00%	5,499	89.87%	8	0.13%
1940	912	14.12%	5,528	85.56%	21	0.33%
1944	1,123	19.08%	4,764	80.92%	0	0.00%
1948	1,689	22.19%	5,247	68.94%	675	8.87%
1952	4,532	34.84%	8,477	65.16%	0	0.00%
1956	5,955	47.31%	6,633	52.69%	0	0.00%
1960	6,108	45.39%	7,350	54.61%	0	0.00%
1964	9,849	52.85%	8,750	46.95%	37	0.20%
1968	7,470	34.72%	4,041	18.78%	10,001	46.49%
1972	15,485	82.12%	3,372	17.88%	0	0.00%
1976	7,713	33.73%	15,151	66.27%	0	0.00%
1980	9,220	39.07%	13,710	58.10%	666	2.82%
1984	15,437	63.50%	8,873	36.50%	0	0.00%
1988	14,697	62.85%	8,548	36.55%	141	0.60%
1992	12,378	44.43%	11,614	41.69%	3,868	13.88%
1996	12,426	48.96%	10,464	41.23%	2,488	9.80%
2000	16,194	60.37%	10,282	38.33%	349	1.30%
2004	21,400	67.56%	10,038	31.69%	238	0.75%
2008	23,132	67.40%	10,691	31.15%	499	1.45%
2012	22,733	69.04%	9,640	29.28%	554	1.68%
2016	24,114	69.17%	9,159	26.27%	1,587	4.55%
2020	28,906	69.88%	11,917	28.81%	542	1.31%
2024	31,631	70.70%	12,862	28.75%	245	0.55%

United States Senate election results for Floyd County, Georgia2
Year	Republican		Democratic		Third party(ies)	
Year	No.	%	No.	%	No.	%
2020	28,752	69.64%	11,480	27.80%	1,056	2.56%
2020	25,108	70.17%	10,676	29.83%	0	0.00%

United States Senate election results for Floyd County, Georgia3
Year	Republican		Democratic		Third party(ies)	
Year	No.	%	No.	%	No.	%
2020	15,417	37.67%	8,151	19.91%	17,362	42.42%
2020	24,959	69.73%	10,834	30.27%	0	0.00%
2022	21,923	68.73%	9,160	28.72%	813	2.55%
2022	19,973	70.50%	8,358	29.50%	0	0.00%

Georgia Gubernatorial election results for Floyd County
Year	Republican		Democratic		Third party(ies)	
Year	No.	%	No.	%	No.	%
2022	23,930	74.60%	7,855	24.49%	293	0.91%

== Education ==
=== Colleges and universities ===
- Berry College
- Shorter University
- Georgia Highlands College
- Georgia Northwestern Technical College

=== Primary and secondary schools ===
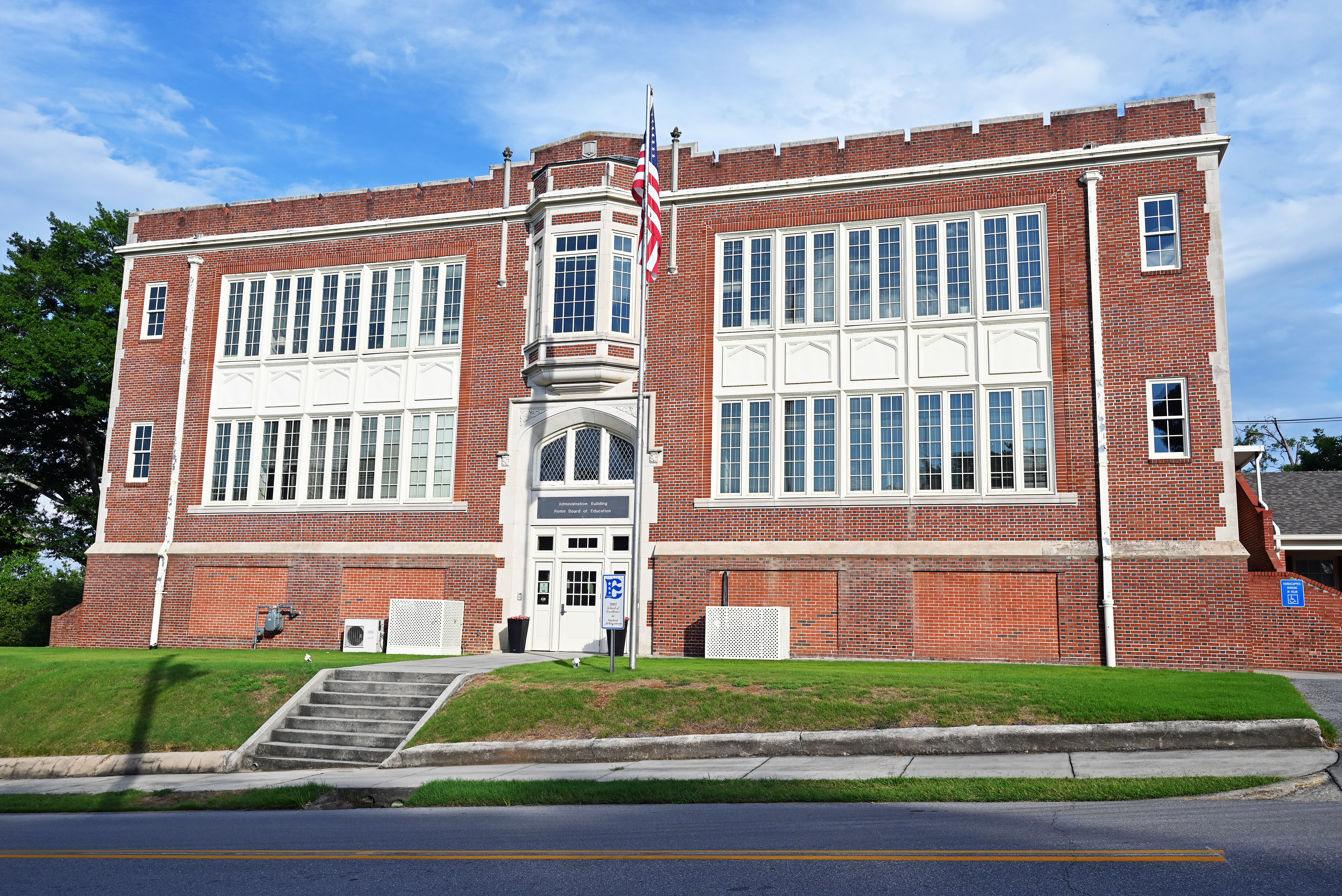
Floyd County Board of Education

Floyd County School District operates schools in most of the county. Its high schools are Armuchee High School, Coosa High School, Model High School, and Pepperell High School.

Rome City School District serves areas in the Rome city limits. Rome High School is its high school.

Private schools

- Unity Christian School
- Darlington School
- St. Mary's Catholic School (of the Roman Catholic Archdiocese of Atlanta)
- Berry College Elementary & Middle School
- Montessori School of Rome

== Law enforcement ==
The Bob Richards Regional Youth Detention Center, part of the Georgia Department of Juvenile Justice, is in Rome.

As of 2022 the Floyd County Sheriff's Office employs 162 people. The current Floyd County Jail was built in 1982 and renovated in 1996. It is the largest building owned by the county government, being 256 thousand square feet in area. In 2020, the jail's average daily population was 507 inmates.

== Notable people ==
- Linda Anderson, according to NPR considered "one of the foremost living memory painters"

== Communities ==
=== Cities ===
- Cave Spring
- Rome

=== Census-designated places ===
- Berry College
- Lindale
- Shannon

=== Unincorporated communities ===
- Armuchee
- Coosa
- Livingston
- Mount Berry
- Silver Creek

== See also ==
- National Register of Historic Places listings in Floyd County, Georgia
- Berry College
- List of counties in Georgia
