= Georgia State Route 154 =

Highway in Georgia

State Route 154
- Georgia State Route 154 highlighted in red

Route information
- Maintained by GDOT
- Length: 56.2 mi (90.4 km)

Major junctions
- West end: SR 54 in Sharpsburg
- I-85 southeast of Palmetto; US 29 Alt. / SR 14 Alt. in Palmetto; SR 166 west of East Point; I-285 in Atlanta; US 29 / SR 14 / SR 139 / SR 166 in Atlanta; US 29 / SR 3 Conn. in Atlanta; US 19 / US 41 / SR 3 US 23 / SR 42 in Atlanta; US 278 / SR 12 in Avondale Estates
- East end: SR 10 east of Avondale Estates

Location
- Country: United States
- State: Georgia
- Counties: Coweta, Fulton, Douglas, DeKalb

Highway system
- Georgia State Highway System; Interstate; US; State; Special
← SR 153	→ SR 155

State Route 154 (SR 154) is a 56.2-mile-long (90.4 km) state highway in the area around Atlanta in the U.S. state of Georgia. It begins in Sharpsburg and ends just to the east of Avondale Estates. The road also runs through portions of Atlanta.

== Route description ==
=== Southwest of Atlanta ===
SR 154 begins at an intersection with SR 54 in Sharpsburg, in Coweta County. It heads northwest and intersects with SR 34 just west of Peachtree City and continues northwest where it has an interchange with Interstate 85 (I-85) at exit 51. Less than 1 mile (1.6 km) north, SR 154 meets US 29/SR 14 and turns north and runs concurrent with US 29/SR 14 to the northeast. In Palmetto, US 29/SR 14 (Roosevelt Highway) split to the northeast, while SR 154 heads north, concurrent with US 29 Alternate/SR 14 Alternate through town, until US 29 Alternate/SR 14 Alternate depart to the east-northeast, along South Fulton Parkway. The route continues to the north and intersects SR 70 (Cochran Mill Road). The two roads begin a concurrency to the northwest. They meet SR 92. The three highways cross the Chattahoochee River, which marks the Coweta–Fulton county line. Then, they intersect SR 166 (Duncan Memorial Highway), which joins the concurrency. The four routes head to the northeast concurrently, until SR 92 (Fairburn Road) splits to the northwest and the other three highways heads east to cross over the Chattahoochee River again, and cross back into Fulton County. About 1 mile (1.6 km) later, SR 70 (Fulton Industrial Boulevard SW) departs to the northeast, while SR 154/SR 166 continue to the east. Just a little bit later, they cross SR 6 (Camp Creek Parkway), entering the Sandtown community on its way to the Ben Hill neighborhood of Atlanta, northeast of which they have an interchange with I-285 (The Perimeter/Atlanta Bypass).

=== Inside the Perimeter ===
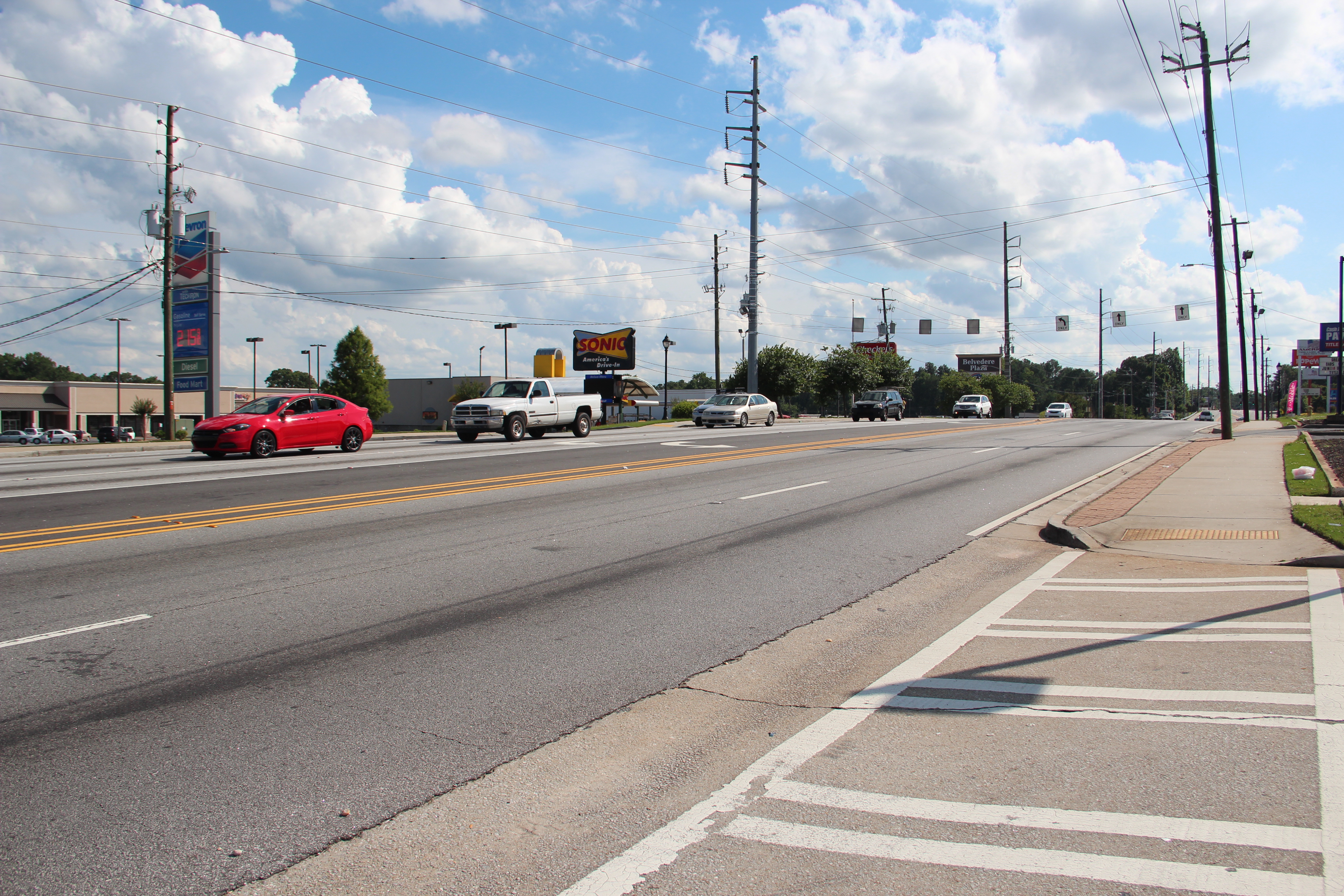
State Route 154 in Belvedere Park

SR 154/SR 166 head east as the Arthur B. Langford Jr. Parkway, a limited-access freeway that was originally named the Lakewood Freeway and was planned as I-420. It runs along the East Point–Atlanta city line, with a brief cross into East Point proper, before running along the city line again. The Parkway passes Fort McPherson Army base. The concurrent routes meets US 29/SR 14/SR 139 (Main Street/Lee Street SW). SR 154 heads north-northeast into Atlanta proper, concurrent with these three highways. Just before reaching I-20, SR 139 departs to the west (on Ralph David Abernathy Boulevard), while US 29/SR 14/SR 154 continue to the north-northeast. They cross under, but don't have an interchange with, I-20. After only about 600 feet (180 m), US 29 departs to the northwest, concurrent along Chapel Street SW, along with SR 3 Connector. SR 14/SR 154 heads northeast and cross over, but don't intersect, US 19/US 41/SR 3. At the intersection with Spring Street SW, SR 14 abruptly ends, and SR 154 continues eastward. A short distance later, it crosses over, but doesn't have an interchange with, I-75/I-85. SR 154 parallels I-20 along Memorial Drive SE, intersecting US 23/SR 42 (Moreland Avenue SE), which forms the Fulton–DeKalb county line. Then, it meets SR 155 (Candler Road SE). SR 154 heads northeast to an intersection with US 278/SR 12 (Covington Highway). It continues to the northeast for about 2,000 feet (610 m) until it meets its eastern terminus, an intersection with SR 10 (Mountain Drive/Memorial Drive).

=== National Highway System ===
The only parts of SR 154 that are part of the National Highway System, a system of roadways important to the nation's economy, defense, and mobility, are those parts concurrent with US 29/SR 14 southwest of Palmetto; US 29 Alternate/SR 14 Alternate in, and northeast of, Palmetto; and the Langford Parkway in East Point and Atlanta.

== Major intersections ==
County	Location	mi	km	Destinations	Notes
Coweta	Sharpsburg	0.0	0.0	SR 54 – Luthersville, Peachtree City	Western terminus
Coweta		5.3	8.5	SR 34 – Newnan, Peachtree City	
Coweta		7.9	12.7	I-85 (SR 403) – Montgomery, Atlanta	I-85 exit 51
Coweta		8.6	13.8	US 29 south / SR 14 south	Western end of US 29/SR 14 concurrency
Fulton	Palmetto	14.5	23.3	US 29 north / SR 14 north (Roosevelt Highway) / US 29 Alt. / SR 14 Alt.	Eastern end of US 29/SR 14 concurrency; western end of US 29 Alt./SR 14 Alt. concurrency
Fulton		18.1	29.1	US 29 Alt. north / SR 14 Alt. north (South Fulton Parkway)	Eastern end of US 29 Alt./SR 14 Alt. concurrency
Fulton		22.8	36.7	SR 70 west (Cochran Mill Road) – Chattahoochee Hills	Western end of SR 70 concurrency
Fulton		23.1	37.2	SR 92 east (Campbellton Fairburn Road) – Fairburn	Western end of SR 92 concurrency
Douglas		24.0	38.6	SR 166 west (Duncan Memorial Highway) – Carrollton	Western end of SR 166 concurrency
Douglas		27.4	44.1	SR 92 west (Fairburn Road) – Douglasville	Eastern end of SR 92 concurrency
Fulton		30.3	48.8	SR 70 east (Fulton Industrial Boulevard SW) – Atlanta	Eastern end of SR 70 concurrency
Fulton		32.7	52.6	SR 6 (Camp Creek Parkway) – Austell, College Park	
Fulton	Atlanta	37.7	60.7	I-285 (Atlanta Bypass / SR 407) – Montgomery, Macon, Birmingham, Chattanooga	I-285 exit 5
Fulton	East Point	42.1	67.8	US 29 south / SR 14 south / SR 139 south (Main Street) / SR 166 east (Arthur B. Langford Jr. Parkway)	Eastern end of SR 166 concurrency; Western end of US 29/SR 14/SR 139 concurrency
Fulton	Atlanta	45.4	73.1	SR 139 north (Ralph David Abernathy Boulevard)	Eastern end of SR 139 concurrency
Fulton	Atlanta	45.8	73.7	US 29 north / SR 3 Conn. north (Chapel Street SW)	Eastern end of US 29 concurrency; southern terminus of SR 3 Conn.
Fulton	Atlanta	46.7	75.2	SR 14	Eastern end of SR 14 concurrency
Fulton–DeKalb county line	Atlanta	49.5	79.7	US 23 / SR 42 (Moreland Avenue SE)	
DeKalb		52.8	85.0	SR 155 (Candler Road SE) – Panthersville, Decatur	
DeKalb	Avondale Estates	55.7	89.6	US 278 / SR 12 (Covington Highway)	
DeKalb		56.2	90.4	SR 10 (Mountain Drive/Memorial Drive) – Atlanta, Stone Mountain	Eastern terminus
1.000 mi = 1.609 km; 1.000 km = 0.621 mi: Concurrency terminus

== Special routes ==
=== State Route 154 Connector ===
State Route 154 Connector
- Location: Atlanta
- Length: 0.5 mi (800 m)

State Route 154 Connector (SR 154 Conn.) is a 0.5-mile-long (0.80 km) connecting route of SR 154 that exists entirely within the southeastern part of Atlanta, in Fulton County.

It begins just east of Grant Park, which contains the Atlanta Cyclorama & Civil War Museum, in Glenwood Park, at an intersection with Glenwood Avenue SE. The highway heads due north to an interchange with Interstate 20 (I-20). It continues its due north orientation until it meets its northern terminus, an intersection with the SR 154 mainline (Memorial Drive SE), in Reynoldstown.

SR 154 Conn. is not part of the National Highway System, a system of roadways important to the nation's economy, defense, and mobility.

The entire route is in Fulton County.

Location	mi	km	Destinations	Notes
0.0	0.0	Glenwood Avenue SE – Grant Park, East Atlanta	Southern terminus	
0.3	0.48	I-20 (Ralph David Abernathy Freeway / SR 402) – Birmingham, Augusta	No access to I-20 east from SR 154 Conn.; no access to SR 154 Conn. from I-20; I-20 exit 59A	
0.5	0.80	SR 154 (Memorial Drive SE)	Northern terminus	
1.000 mi = 1.609 km; 1.000 km = 0.621 mi: Incomplete access

=== State Route 154 Spur ===
State Route 154 Spur
- Location: Southeast of Avondale Estates
- Length: 0.6 mi (970 m)

State Route 154 Spur (SR 154 Spur) exists entirely within the central part of DeKalb County, southeast of Avondale Estates.

It begins at an intersection with the SR 154 mainline (Memorial Drive SE) and runs in a generally eastern route to meet its eastern terminus, an intersection with US 278/SR 12 (Covington Highway).

SR 154 Spur is not part of the National Highway System, a system of roadways important to the nation's economy, defense, and mobility.

The entire route is in DeKalb County.

Location	mi	km	Destinations	Notes
	0.0	0.0	SR 154 (Memorial Drive SE) – Stone Mountain	Western terminus
	0.6	0.97	US 278 / SR 12 (Covington Highway) – Decatur, Lithonia	Eastern terminus
1.000 mi = 1.609 km; 1.000 km = 0.621 mi
