= Georgia State Route 139 =

State highway in Georgia, United States

State Route 139
- SR 139 highlighted in red

Route information
- Maintained by GDOT
- Length: 29.8 mi (48.0 km)

Major junctions
- South end: SR 85 / Rountree Road in Riverdale
- I-285 in College Park; I-85 in College Park; US 29 / SR 14 in College Park; SR 154 / SR 166 in East Point; US 29 / SR 14 / SR 154 in Downtown Atlanta; I-285 in Atlanta
- North end: US 78 / US 278 / SR 8 in Mableton

Location
- Country: United States
- State: Georgia
- Counties: Clayton, Fulton, Cobb

Highway system
- Georgia State Highway System; Interstate; US; State; Special
← SR 138	→ SR 140

Georgia State Route 139 is a 29.8-mile-long (48.0 km) state highway in the northeast part of state of Georgia. It travels within portions of Clayton, Fulton, and Cobb counties and connects the southern suburbs of Atlanta with the town of Mableton, west of the city.

== Route description ==
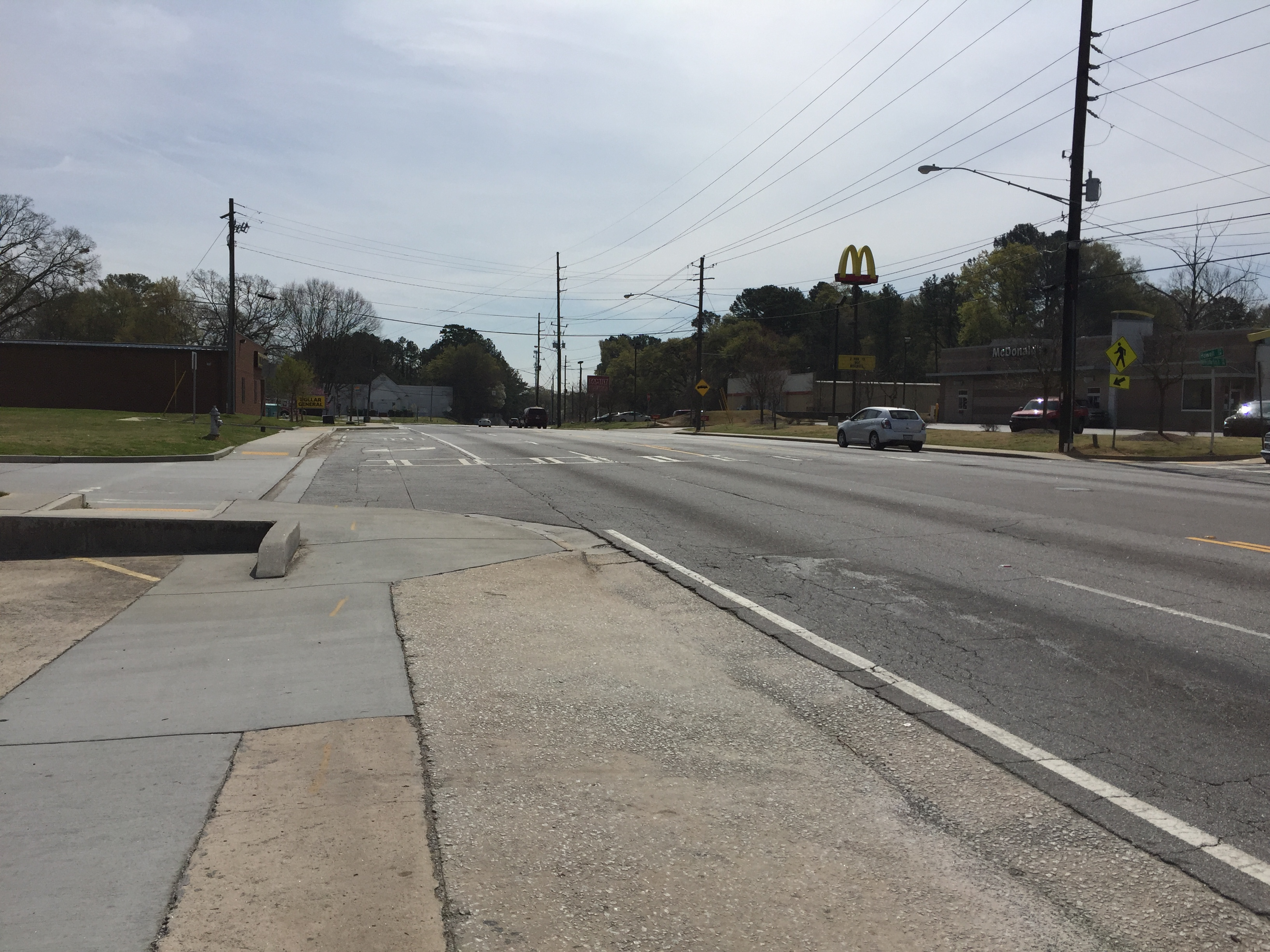
State Route 139 in Adamsville

SR 139 begins at an intersection with SR 85 in the southern part of the town of Riverdale, in Clayton County. It heads northwest to the city of College Park. In the town, it first has an interchange with Interstate 285 (I-285). The highway intersects SR 314 (West Fayetteville Road) and then runs along the southwestern part of the Hartsfield–Jackson Atlanta International Airport. Then, it has an interchange with I-85. Immediately after this interchange is the Fulton County line. Shortly afterward, the highway passes over, but does not intersect US 29/SR 14. It continues northwest and turns to the north at Jamestown Park. At SR 6 (Camp Creek Parkway), they run concurrently to the east. The two highways cross back into Clayton County for just over 1,000 feet (300 m). Then, they enter Fulton County again and intersect US 29/SR 14. SR 139 joins their concurrency. To the northeast, they pass through East Point, where they have an interchange with SR 154/SR 166 (Arthur B. Langford Jr. Parkway), just before they enter Atlanta and pass Fort McPherson. At this interchange, SR 154 joins the concurrency. They pass through the Oakland City neighborhood before SR 139 departs to the west on Ralph David Abernathy Boulevard. After leaving the concurrency, it passes through the West End neighborhood. Then, it passes just north of Westview Cemetery, before intersecting with SR 280 (Hamilton E. Holmes Drive NW), at which point the road becomes known as Martin Luther King Jr. Drive. A short distance later is a second interchange with I-285, the neighborhood of Adamsville. After that, it passes under, but does not have an interchange with I-20 (Tom Murphy Freeway). Just northwest of I-20 is SR 70 (Fulton Industrial Boulevard NW) and Fulton County Airport–Brown Field. The road crosses over the Chattahoochee River into Cobb County. It passes through rural areas until it meets its northern terminus, an intersection with US 78/US 278/SR 8 (Veterans Memorial Highway SW), in Mableton.

SR 139 is not part of the National Highway System.

== Major intersections ==
County	Location	mi	km	Destinations	Notes
Clayton	Riverdale	0.0	0.0	SR 85 – Fayetteville, Forest Park	Southern terminus; Road continues as Rountree Road
Clayton	College Park	4.8	7.7	I-285 (Atlanta Bypass / SR 407)	I-285 exit 60
Clayton	College Park	5.7	9.2	SR 314 south (West Fayetteville Road) – Fayetteville	Northern terminus of SR 314
Clayton	College Park	7.8	12.6	I-85 (SR 407) – Montgomery, Atlanta	I-85 exit 71
Fulton	College Park	9.4	15.1	SR 6 west (Camp Creek Parkway) – Austell	Southern end of SR 6 concurrency
Clayton	College Park	10.5	16.9	US 29 south / SR 14 south (Roosevelt Highway) / SR 6 east (Camp Creek Parkway)	Southern end of US 29/SR 14 concurrency; northern end of SR 6 concurrency
Fulton	East Point	14.7	23.7	SR 154 west / SR 166 (Arthur B. Langford Jr. Parkway) – Palmetto, Carrollton	Southern end of SR 154 concurrency
Fulton	Atlanta	17.8	28.6	US 29 north / SR 14 north / SR 154 east (West Whitehall Street SW)	Northern end of US 29/SR 14 and SR 154 concurrencies
Fulton	Atlanta	21.3	34.3	SR 280 north (Hamilton E. Holmes Drive NW) – Smyrna	Southern terminus of SR 280
Fulton	Atlanta	23.0	37.0	I-285 (Atlanta Bypass / SR 407)	I-285 exit 9
Fulton	Atlanta	24.9	40.1	SR 70 (Fulton Industrial Boulevard NW) – Fulton County Airport–Brown Field	
Chattahoochee River		25.9	41.7	Unnamed bridge; crossing over the Chattahoochee River, marking the Fulton–Cobb county line	
Cobb	Mableton	29.8	48.0	US 78 / US 278 / SR 8 (Veterans Memorial Highway SW)	Northern terminus
1.000 mi = 1.609 km; 1.000 km = 0.621 mi: Concurrency terminus
