= Georgia State Route 6 =

State highway in west-central Georgia

State Route 6
- Georgia State Route 6 highlighted in red

Route information
- Maintained by GDOT
- Length: 72.1 mi (116.0 km)

Major junctions
- West end: US 278 / SR 74 at the Alabama state line, northwest of Esom Hill
- US 27 / SR 1 / SR 100 in Cedartown; SR 92 in Hiram; US 78 / US 278 / SR 5 / SR 8 in Lithia Springs; I-20 in Lithia Springs; SR 154 / SR 166 west of Atlanta; I-285 in East Point; US 29 / SR 14 / SR 139 in College Park
- East end: I-85 west of Atlanta Airport

Location
- Country: United States
- State: Georgia
- Counties: Polk, Paulding, Cobb, Douglas, Fulton, Clayton

Highway system
- Georgia State Highway System; Interstate; US; State; Special
← SR 5	→ SR 7

State Route 6 (SR 6) is a 72.1-mile-long (116.0 km) state highway that travels northwest-to-southeast in the U.S. state of Georgia. It is known as Jimmy Lee Smith Parkway, Jimmy Campbell Parkway, Nathan Dean Parkway, and Wendy Bagwell Parkway in Paulding County; C.H. James Parkway in Cobb County; Thornton Road in Douglas County; and Camp Creek Parkway and honorarily as Tuskegee Airmen Parkway in Fulton and Clayton counties. It begins at the Alabama state line, where it is concurrent with US 278. Here, US 278 enters Alabama, concurrent with the unsigned state highway SR 74. Its eastern terminus is at an interchange with Interstate 85 (I-85) west of Hartsfield–Jackson Atlanta International Airport.

== Route description ==
SR 6 starts at the Alabama state line, southwest of Cedartown, and northwest of Esom Hill in Polk County, and initially heads east to Cedartown, concurrent with US 278 from its western terminus. Skirting Cedartown around the south, the highway continues east to Rockmart, where it turns sharply to the south and then southeast into Paulding County and Dallas. Bypassing Dallas to the south, SR 6 continues traveling to the southeast and travels through the southwestern corner of Cobb County, through Powder Springs, to Austell in Douglas County.

In Lithia Springs, the highway approaches the intersection with US 78/SR 5/SR 8, where US 278 turns left and joins a concurrency with US 78 as far east as Druid Hills, while SR 6 continues southeast where it has an intersection with Maxham Drive, a local boulevard spanning from the Westfork Shopping Center through SR 5, and later crosses over I-20, where it has a partial cloverleaf and half-diamond interchange. Forming the county line between Cobb and Douglas counties, the highway continues traveling to the southeast, and crosses the Chattahoochee River into Fulton County. Curving to the east, the highway crosses I-285 and reaches its eastern terminus at the western edge of Hartsfield–Jackson Atlanta International Airport in College Park.

The entire length of SR 6 is part of the National Highway System, a system of routes determined to be the most important for the nation's economy, mobility, and defense.

== History ==
SR 6 was established at least as early as 1919 from SR 1 in Cedartown east-southeast through Dallas to SR 8 in Austell. By the end of September 1921, it was extended westward to the Alabama state line. By October 1926, US 78 was designated on SR 8 at SR 6's eastern terminus. About 20 years later, between the beginning of 1945 and November 1946, the entire segment from Alabama to Austell was hard surfaced. Between June 1954 and June 1955, US 278 was designated on the entire original segment. Between June 1963 and the end of 1965, SR 6 was extended south-southwest on US 78/SR 8 to a point south-southwest of Austell and then on a sole path southeast to I-20; this entire extension was hard surfaced. At this time, Camp Creek Parkway was established from Welcome All Road west-southwest of College Park to US 29/SR 14 in the city. Between the beginning of 1963 and the beginning of 1969, a northern bypass of the main part of Rockmart was built from US 278/SR 6 west-northwest of the city to SR 113 in the northwestern part of the city. By the beginning of 1974, an eastern bypass of the main part of Rockmart was proposed from US 278/SR 6/SR 100 southeast of Van Wert north-northwest and north to SR 113 in the northwest part of Rockmart. In 1976, SR 139 was rerouted westward just west of the Atlanta Airport, onto the path of US 29/SR 14. Due to this, Camp Creek Parkway was extended eastward to I-85. Between the beginning of 1979 and March 1980, Camp Creek Parkway was extended westward to Old Fairburn Road and northwest to Butner Road. Between the beginning of 1979 and the beginning of 1982, SR 6's path in Cedartown was shifted westward one block, replacing the entire length of SR 6 Loop. In 1983, a western bypass of Powder Springs, Clarkdale, and Austell, designated as SR 726, was proposed from an unnumbered road south-southwest of Powder Springs to US 78/SR 5/SR 8 southwest of Austell.

In 1986, a slightly northern rerouting of US 278/SR 6 was proposed from just east of the Paulding–Cobb county line to the northern part of Powder Springs. US 278/SR 6 in the Powder Springs–Austell area was shifted westward, onto the path of SR 726 and the northern part of the unnumbered road in Powder Springs. The former path from Powder Springs to Austell was redesignated as SR 6 Bus. Camp Creek Parkway was extended north-northwest to connect with the eastern terminus of SR 6. The next year, SR 744 Spur was proposed from US 27/SR 1/SR 100 in the southern part of Cedartown to the proposed path of SR 744 southeast of it. Part of the eastern bypass of Rockmart, designated as SR 748, was proposed from SR 113 east-northeast of the city south and south-southeast to US 278/SR 6 east-southeast of Van Wert. A northeastern bypass of Yorkville, designated as SR 789, was proposed from north-northeast of Yorkville to east of it. A southern bypass of Dallas, designated as SR 768, was proposed from west-southwest of Dallas to US 278/SR 6/SR 120 southeast of it; this replaced the proposed path of SR 6 Byp. In 1988, a proposed northern rerouting of US 278/SR 6 was designated as a second iteration of SR 726. In 1990, US 278/SR 6 was shifted northeast from Van Wert on SR 113 and southeast on the proposed path of SR 748, with SR 101/SR 113 concurrent with them to Yorkville. US 278/SR 6/SR 120 was routed on the proposed path of SR 768. At this time, SR 726 was completed. Also, Camp Creek Parkway's path between I-285 and I-85 was designated as SR 387. The next year, the path of US 278/SR 6 in Cedartown was shifted southward from the central part of the city to the southern part, onto the proposed path of SR 744 Spur. US 278/SR 6, as well as part of US 27/SR 1, was routed onto parts of the former path of SR 744. US 278/SR 6 in Rockmart was shifted northward onto a more direct path just north of the city. US 278/SR 6 in the Powder Springs area was shifted northward, onto the former path of SR 726. Also, SR 387 was decommissioned. In 1987, SR 6 was extended on the entire length of Camp Creek Parkway, to its eastern terminus.

On March 14, 1984, US 278 and SR 6, between Powder Springs and Austell, was designated as the 'C. H. (Fat) James, Sr., Memorial Highway'.

Recently, at the intersection of SR 6 and I-285 in East Point, there has been a renaissance for southern Fulton County: the opening of the Camp Creek MarketPlace. It was opened in late 2003, and the second portion opened in spring or summer of 2006.

On August 1, 2008, Camp Creek Parkway, the 12-mile (19 km) stretch of SR 6, between SR 70 and I-85, was honorarily designated Tuskegee Airmen Parkway.

As of March 2009, the portion of the highway in Fulton County is no longer signed as SR 6. The only signage on this route are the Tuskegee Airmen Parkway signs. The portion near I-285 and the Atlanta Airport, which is in Clayton County, is still signed as SR 6.

== Major intersections ==
County	Location	mi	km	Destinations	Notes
Polk		0.0	0.0	US 278 west (SR 74) – Piedmont	Alabama state line; western terminus
Polk		8.2	13.2	SR 100 north – Cave Spring, Summerville	West end of SR 100 concurrency
Polk	Cedartown	9.6	15.4	US 27 Bus. / SR 1 Bus. (Main Street) – Rome, Cedartown, Buchanan	
Polk	Cedartown	11.1	17.9	US 27 south / SR 1 south / SR 100 south (Martha Berry Highway) – Buchanan, Tallapoosa	East end of SR 100 concurrency; west end of US 27/SR 1 concurrency
Polk	Cedartown	12.9	20.8	US 27 north / SR 1 north / East Avenue – Rome, Cedartown	Interchange; east end of US 27/SR 1 concurrency
Polk	Rockmart	21.8	35.1	US 278 Bus. east / SR 6 Bus. east	Western terminus of US 278 Bus./SR 6 Bus.
Polk	Rockmart	23.4	37.7	US 278 Bus. west / SR 6 Bus. west / SR 101 north – Rome, Aragon, Rockmart	Eastern terminus of US 278 Bus./SR 6 Bus.; west end of SR 101 concurrency
Polk	Rockmart	24.3	39.1	SR 113 north (Cartersville Road) – Cartersville, Rockmart	West end of SR 113 concurrency
Polk		27.1	43.6	Old Atlanta Highway – Rockmart	Former segment of US 278/SR 6/SR 101/SR 113
Polk		28.0	45.1	SR 101 south / SR 113 south – Villa Rica, Temple	East end of SR 101 and SR 113 concurrencies
Paulding	Dallas	36.9	59.4	West Memorial Drive – Dallas Business District	Former segment of US 278/SR 6
Paulding	Dallas	37.6	60.5	SR 6 Bus. east / SR 120 west (Buchanan Street) – Dallas, Tallapoosa, Buchanan	West end of SR 120 concurrency; western terminus of SR 6 Bus.
Paulding	Dallas	39.6	63.7	SR 61 (Nathan Dean Boulevard) to SR 6 Bus. – Cartersville, Dallas, Villa Rica	
Paulding	Hiram	42.4	68.2	SR 120 east / SR 360 east (Charles Hardy Parkway) – Marietta	East end of SR 120 concurrency
Paulding	Hiram	42.8	68.9	SR 6 Bus. west (Atlanta Highway)	Eastern terminus of SR 6 Bus.
Paulding	Hiram	44.0	70.8	SR 92 – Hiram, Historic Downtown Hiram, Pickett's Mill Historic Site	
Douglas	Powder Springs	49.2	79.2	Brownsville Road – Powder Springs, Sun Valley Beach	Former western terminus of SR 6 Bus.
Douglas	Lithia Springs	54.1	87.1	US 78 / US 278 east / SR 5 / SR 8 (Bankhead Highway) – Austell, Lithia Springs, Douglasville	East end of US 278 concurrency
Douglas	Lithia Springs	56.7	91.2	I-20 (SR 402) – Atlanta, Birmingham	I-20 exit 44
Fulton		60.6	97.5	SR 70 (Fulton Industrial Boulevard) to SR 154 west / I-20 – Newnan, Palmetto	
Fulton		62.7	100.9	SR 154 / SR 166 (Campbellton Road) to I-285 – Palmetto, Carrollton, East Point, Atlanta	
Fulton	East Point	68.9	110.9	I-285 (SR 407) – Birmingham, Montgomery	I-285 exit 2
Clayton–Fulton county line	College Park	71.7	115.4	Main Street (US 29/SR 14/SR 139) – Union City, Fairburn, Hartsfield–Jackson Atlanta International Airport, Atlanta	Interchange
Clayton–Fulton county line	College Park	71.9	115.7	I-85 (SR 403) – Montgomery, Atlanta, Hartsfield–Jackson Atlanta International Airport	Eastern terminus; I-85 exit 72; roadway continues as Airport Boulevard.
1.000 mi = 1.609 km; 1.000 km = 0.621 mi: Concurrency terminus

== Special routes ==
=== Cedartown loop route ===
State Route 6 Loop
- Location: Cedartown
- Existed: 1965–1982

State Route 6 Loop (SR 6 Loop) was a short loop route of SR 6 that existed entirely within the city limits of Cedartown. Between June 1963 and the beginning of 1966, it was established from US 278/SR 6 north to SR 100. In 1976, SR 100 was shifted westward, and SR 6 Loop's northern terminus was extended east-southeast to US 27/SR 1 in the northern part of the city. In 1982, the path of SR 6 was shifted westward one block, replacing the path of SR 6 Loop.

The entire route was in Cedartown, Polk County.

mi	km	Destinations	Notes
		US 278 / SR 6 / SR 100	Southern terminus
		US 27 / SR 1	Northern terminus
1.000 mi = 1.609 km; 1.000 km = 0.621 mi

=== Rockmart business loop ===
State Route 6 Business
- Location: Rockmart
- Length: 3.2 mi (5.1 km)

State Route 6 Business (SR 6 Bus.) is a 3.2-mile-long (5.1 km) business route of SR 6. Nearly the entire road is within the city limits of Rockmart. Its entire length is concurrent with U.S. Route 278 Business (US 278 Bus.).

=== Dallas spur route ===
State Route 6 Spur
- Location: Dallas
- Existed: 1966–1983

State Route 6 Spur (SR 6 Spur) was a spur route of SR 6 that existed southeast of the city limits of Dallas. In 1966, it was established from SR 61 to US 278/SR 6. In 1983, it was decommissioned.

The entire route was in Paulding County.

Location	mi	km	Destinations	Notes
			SR 61	Western terminus
			US 278 / SR 6	Eastern terminus
1.000 mi = 1.609 km; 1.000 km = 0.621 mi

=== Dallas bypass route ===
State Route 6 Bypass
- Location: Dallas

State Route 6 Bypass (SR 6 Byp.) was a proposed bypass route of SR 6 that was proposed just outside of the city limits of Dallas. In 1983, its planned path was from US 278/SR 6 west-southwest of the city to US 278/SR 6/SR 120 southeast of it. In 1987, SR 768 was proposed on the path that SR 6 Byp. was planned to travel, thereby replacing it.

=== Dallas–Hiram business loop ===
State Route 6 Business
- Location: Dallas–Hiram
- Length: 6.0 mi (9.7 km)
- Existed: 1992–present

State Route 6 Business (SR 6 Bus.) is a 6.0-mile-long (9.7 km) business route that travels from Dallas to Hiram. It consists of Buchanan Street, West Memorial Drive, East Memorial Drive, Merchants Drive, and Atlanta Highway. Unlike SR 6 Bus. in Rockmart, it is not concurrent with a business route of U.S. Route 278 (US 278).

SR 6 Bus. begins along Buchanan Street as SR 120 turns right onto the intersection with US 278/SR 6 (Jimmy Campbell Parkway). Buchanan Street ends at West Memorial Drive, and SR 6 Bus. turns right. From that point on, it follows the former path of SR 6. Curving toward the northeast, SR 6 Bus. encounters a paved trail that turns along the south side of the road, then both travel on bridges over Weaver Creek and then travel under a railroad bridge, before making a curve back towards the east-northeast as it gets closer to downtown Dallas. At the intersection of North Confederate Avenue and Main Street, SR 61 leaves North Confederate Avenue and joins SR 6 Bus. in a concurrency, and the name changes from West Memorial Drive to East Memorial Drive.

SR 6 Bus. and SR 61 leave East Memorial Drive (former SR 381) and make a right curve onto Merchants Drive. The highways travel south-southeast down a hill along the eastern edge of downtown Dallas, but then begins to elevate in the vicinity of the local post office. SR 61 leaves SR 6 Bus. at Nathan Dean Boulevard, and later the road curves from south-southeast to southeast at Hardee Street, formerly SR 6 Spur. It turns due east just before the intersection with Heritage Club Boulevard, but then curves east-northeast before the intersection of Old Harris Road, only to turn due east again after a fork in the road with Macland Road, across from an intersection with Butler Industrial Drive. Just before leaving Dallas, it travels along the south side of Carter Lake.

Before the intersection with Paris Road, the highway enters the Hiram city limits, where Merchants Drive becomes Atlanta Highway, and climbs a slight hill. At New Canaan Baptist Church and Cemetery, the road descends along another hill, but climbs back up before the intersection with Cobbler Cove Drive. At Summerhill Road, SR 6 Bus. starts to curve to the southeast and approaches an intersection with SR 120/SR 360 (Charles Hardy Parkway). Shortly after this, the business curves to the southeast and then to the south-southwest to end at US 278/SR 6 at the intersection with the northern terminus of Highland Falls Boulevard.

In 1992, SR 6 Bus. was established on its current path.

The entire route is in Paulding County.

Location	mi	km	Destinations	Notes
Dallas	0.0	0.0	US 278 / SR 6 (Jimmy Campbell Parkway) / SR 120 (Buchanan Street) – Rockmart, Powder Springs, Buchanan	Western terminus
Dallas	0.4	0.64	West Memorial Drive west	Former SR 381 south
Dallas	1.2	1.9	SR 61 north (North Confederate Avenue) / Main Street – Cartersville	West end of SR 61 concurrency
Dallas	1.5	2.4	East Memorial Drive east	Former SR 381 north
Dallas	2.2	3.5	SR 61 south (Nathan Dean Boulevard) – Villa Rica	East end of SR 61 concurrency
Dallas	2.7	4.3	Hardee Street north	Former SR 6 Spur west
Hiram	5.3	8.5	SR 120 / SR 360 (Charles Hardy Parkway) – Buchanan, Marietta	
Hiram	6.0	9.7	US 278 / SR 6 (Jimmy Lee Smith Parkway) / Highland Falls Boulevard south	Eastern terminus of SR 6 Bus.; northern terminus of Highland Falls Boulevard
1.000 mi = 1.609 km; 1.000 km = 0.621 mi: Concurrency terminus

=== Powder Springs–Austell business loop ===
State Route 6 Business
- Location: Powder Springs–Austell
- Existed: 1986–2001

State Route 6 Business (SR 6 Bus.) was a business route of SR 6 that existed in Powder Springs and Austell. In 1983, a western bypass of the cities, designated as SR 726, was proposed from an unnumbered road south-southwest of Powder Springs to US 78/SR 5/SR 8 southwest of Austell. In 1986, the path of US 278/SR 6 was shifted westward, onto the path of SR 726 and the northern part of the unnumbered road; the former path was redesignated as SR 6 Bus. In 2001, it was decommissioned.

The entire route was in Cobb County.

Location	mi	km	Destinations	Notes
Powder Springs			US 278 / SR 6	Western terminus
			SR 176 north	Southern terminus of SR 176
Austell			US 278 / SR 6	Eastern terminus
1.000 mi = 1.609 km; 1.000 km = 0.621 mi

=== Austell spur route ===
State Route 6 Spur
- Location: Austell
- Length: 0.8 mi (1,300 m)
- Existed: 2012–present

State Route 6 Spur (SR 6 Spur) in Austell is a 0.8-mile-long (1.3 km) spur route that is known as Dr. Luke Glenn Garrett Jr. Memorial Highway. It parallels Sweetwater Creek. It begins at an intersection with US 278/SR 6 (C.H. James Parkway). Here, the roadway continues as Garrett Road. SR 6 Spur travels to the northeast and travels on a bridge over some railroad tracks of Norfolk Southern Railway (NS). It passes the John W. Whitaker Intermodal Terminal for NS. It continues to the northwest until it reaches its eastern terminus, an intersection with Powder Springs Road. Here, the roadway continues as Westside Road, which provides access to Luke Garrett Middle School. The roadway that would eventually become SR 6 Spur was established in 2004. Between the beginning of 2004 and the beginning of 2013, it was designated as SR 6 Spur.

The entire route is in Austell, Cobb County.

mi	km	Destinations	Notes
0.0	0.0	US 278 / SR 6 (C.H. James Parkway) / Garrett Road west – Powder Springs, Atlanta	Western terminus of SR 6 Spur; eastern terminus of Garrett Road
0.8	1.3	Powder Springs Road / Westside Road east	Eastern terminus of SR 6 Spur; western terminus of Westside Road
1.000 mi = 1.609 km; 1.000 km = 0.621 mi
