= Georgia State Route 14 =

State highway in Georgia

State Route 14

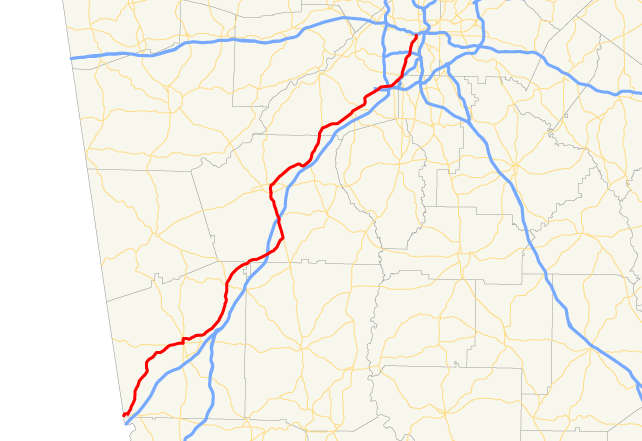

Route information
- Maintained by GDOT
- Length: 87.30 mi (140.50 km)
- Existed: 1919–present

Major junctions
- South end: US 29 / SR 15 at the Alabama state line in West Point
- US 27 / SR 1 / SR 219 in LaGrange; I-85 in Grantville; US 27 Alt. / SR 41 in Moreland; I-85 south of East Newnan; US 27 Alt. / SR 16 / SR 34 in Newnan; US 29 Alt. / SR 14 Alt. in Red Oak; I-85 / I-285 in College Park west of Hartsfield–Jackson Atlanta International Airport; US 29 / SR 3 Conn. in West End
- North end: SR 154 at Ted Turner Drive, Downtown Atlanta

Location
- Country: United States
- State: Georgia
- Counties: Troup, Coweta, Fulton

Highway system
- Georgia State Highway System; Interstate; US; State; Special
← SR 13	→ SR 15

State Route 14 (SR 14) is a 87.30-mile-long (140.50 km) state highway that travels southwest-to-northeast through portions of Troup, Coweta, and Fulton counties in the west-central and north-central parts of the U.S. state of Georgia. The highway connects the Alabama state line in West Point to Downtown Atlanta, via LaGrange, Fairburn, College Park, and East Point. Except for the northernmost segment, it is entirely concurrent with U.S. Route 29 (US 29).

== Route description ==
SR 14 starts at its southern terminus just west of the Chattahoochee River in West Point in Troup County, and travels northeast through LaGrange, paralleling I-85 to the west, and is concurrent with US 29 for almost its entire length, with the exception of a brief distance at its northern terminus. US 29/SR 14 turns slightly north after leaving LaGrange and travels through Hogansville, then turns northeast again, traveling through Grantville, before crossing I-85 and traveling parallel to the interstate on its east side through portions of Coweta County.

The route then travels into Moreland, where it turns slightly northwest, crosses I-85 once more, and heads into Newnan. Turning northeast once more, the route crosses into Fulton County and heads through Palmetto, Fairburn, and Union City, before crossing I-285 west of Hartsfield–Jackson Atlanta International Airport. SR 14 then continues through East Point, crosses I-20, and arrives at its northern terminus at SR 154 and Ted Turner Drive NW in downtown Atlanta.

There following portions of SR 14 are part of the National Highway System, a system of routes determined to be the most important for the nation's economy, mobility, and defense:

- The concurrency with US 27/SR 1 in LaGrange
- From the I-85 interchange south of East Newnan to the intersection with SR 34 Byp. in Newnan
- From SR 74 in Fairburn to the US 29 Alt./SR 14 Alt. in Red Oak

== History ==
SR 14 was established at least as early as 1919 on its current path, from West Point to Atlanta. Between September 1921 and October 1926, US 29 was designated on SR 14's entire length. Three segments of the highway had a completed hard surface: a portion in the east-northeast part of West Point, from south-southwest of LaGrange to just southwest of the Troup–Meriwether–Coweta county tripoint, and from Moreland to Atlanta. By October 1929, the entire highway had a completed hard surface.

== Major intersections ==
County	Location	mi	km	Destinations	Notes
Troup	West Point	0.000	0.000	US 29 south (SR 15) – Lanett	Southern terminus; southern end of US 29 concurrency; continuation into Alabama
Troup	West Point	0.881	1.418	SR 18 east (East 10th Street) – Pine Mountain	Western terminus of SR 18
Troup	LaGrange	14.277	22.977	SR 109 west (Roanoke Road) – Roanoke	Southern end of SR 109 concurrency
Troup	LaGrange	15.570	25.057	SR 14 Conn. north (Broad Street)	Western terminus of SR 14 Conn.
Troup	LaGrange	16.567	26.662	US 27 south / SR 1 south / SR 219 south / SR 109 east (Martha Berry Highway) – Pine Mountain, Columbus	Northern end of SR 109 concurrency; southern end of US 27/SR 1 and SR 219 concurrencies
Troup	LaGrange	16.617	26.742	SR 14 Conn. west / SR 219 north (Greenville Street) – West Point	Northern end of SR 219 concurrency; eastern terminus of SR 14 Conn.
Troup	LaGrange	17.319	27.872	US 27 north / SR 1 north (Martha Berry Highway) – Franklin, Carrollton	Northern end of US 27/SR 1 concurrency
Troup	LaGrange	19.955	32.114	SR 14 Spur south (Davis Road) to I-85 / I-185	Northern terminus of SR 14 Spur
Troup	Hogansville	29.824	47.997	SR 54 / SR 100 south (Main Street) to I-85 – Luthersville	Southern end of SR 100 concurrency
Troup	Hogansville	30.271	48.716	SR 100 north (Corinth Road) – Franklin	Northern end of SR 100 concurrency
Coweta	Grantville	38.121	61.350	I-85 (SR 403) – Montgomery, Atlanta	I-85 exit 35
Coweta	Moreland	41.732	67.161	US 27 Alt. south / SR 41 south – Luthersville	Southern end of US 27 Alt. concurrency; northern terminus of SR 41
Coweta		44.940	72.324	I-85 (SR 403) – Montgomery, Atlanta	I-85 exit 41
Coweta	East Newnan	45.391	73.050	SR 16 east – Sharpsburg	Southern end of SR 16 concurrency
Coweta	Newnan	49.208	79.193	US 27 Alt. north / SR 16 west / SR 34 (Temple Avenue / Bullsboro Drive) – Carrollton, Peachtree City, Franklin	Northern end of US 27 Alt. and SR 16 concurrencies
Coweta	Newnan	50.090	80.612	SR 70 north (Roscoe Road)	Southern terminus of SR 70
Coweta	Newnan	50.615	81.457	SR 34 Byp. (Millard Farmer Industrial Boulevard) to I-85 – Franklin, Peachtree City	
Coweta		57.646	92.772	SR 154 south to I-85 – Sharpsburg	Southern end of SR 154 concurrency
Fulton	Palmetto	63.550	102.274	SR 154 north / US 29 Alt. north / SR 14 Alt. north (Cascade Palmetto Highway)	Northern end of SR 154 concurrency; southern terminus of US 29 Alt./SR 14 Alt.
Fulton	Fairburn	68.224	109.796	SR 74 south (Virlyn B Smith Road, Fairburn Industrial Boulevard) to I-85 – Tyrone	Northern terminus of SR 74
Fulton	Fairburn	69.122	111.241	SR 92 south (Campbellton Street)	Southern end of SR 92 concurrency
Fulton	Fairburn	70.137	112.875	SR 92 north / SR 138 (Beverly Engram Parkway) – Jonesboro	Northern end of SR 92 concurrency
Fulton	Red Oak	74.746	120.292	US 29 Alt. south / SR 14 Alt. south / SR 14 Conn. east to I-85 / I-285	Northern terminus of US 29 Alt. and SR 14 Alt.; western terminus of SR 14 Conn.
Fulton	College Park	77.311	124.420	SR 279 south (Old National Highway)	Northern terminus of SR 279
Fulton	College Park	77.671	124.999	SR 139 south (Riverdale Road)	Southern end of SR 139 concurrency
Fulton	College Park	79.012	127.157	SR 6 (Camp Creek Parkway) to I-85	
Fulton	East Point	82.973	133.532	SR 154 west / SR 166 (Arthur B. Langford Jr. Parkway)	Southern end of SR 154 concurrency
Fulton	Atlanta	85.997	138.399	SR 139 north (Gordon Street)	Northern end of SR 139 concurrency
Fulton	Atlanta	86.360	138.983	US 29 north / SR 3 Conn. north (Chapel Street) to US 19 / US 41 / SR 3	Northern end of US 29 concurrency; southern terminus of SR 3 Conn.
Fulton	Atlanta	87.296	140.489	SR 154 east (Trinity Avenue) / Ted Turner Drive	Northern terminus; northern end of SR 154 concurrency
1.000 mi = 1.609 km; 1.000 km = 0.621 mi: Concurrency terminus

== Special routes ==
=== LaGrange alternate route ===
State Route 14 Alternate
- Location: LaGrange
- Existed: 1965–1976

State Route 14 Alternate (SR 14 Alt.) was an alternate route of SR 14 that existed entirely within the city limits of LaGrange. Between June 1963 and the beginning of 1966, it was established from US 29/SR 14/SR 109 (Broad Street) east past SR 219 to US 27/SR 1/SR 219 (Hamilton Road; this intersection also served as the western terminus of SR 720) and north on them to US 29/SR 14/SR 219 (Broad Street; this intersection also served as the southern terminus of US 29 Bus./SR 14 Conn. Between the beginning of 1974 and the beginning of 1977, the path of US 29/SR 14/SR 109 in the western part of the city was shifted southward, replacing the path of SR 14 Alt.

The entire route was in LaGrange, Troup County.

mi	km	Destinations	Notes
		US 29 / SR 14 / SR 109	Western terminus
		SR 219 south	Southbound lanes of SR 219 on one-way pair
		US 27 south / SR 1 south / SR 219 south / SR 720 east	West end of US 27/SR 1/SR 219 concurrency; northbound lanes of SR 219 on one-way pair; western terminus of SR 720
		US 27 north / US 29 / SR 1 north / SR 14 / SR 109 / SR 219 north / US 29 Bus. north / SR 14 Conn. north	Eastern terminus; east end of US 27/SR 1/SR 219 concurrency; southern terminus of US 29 Bus./SR 14 Conn.
1.000 mi = 1.609 km; 1.000 km = 0.621 mi: Concurrency terminus

=== LaGrange connector route (1965–1976) ===
State Route 14 Connector
- Location: LaGrange
- Existed: 1965–1976

State Route 14 Connector (SR 14 Conn.) was a connector route of SR 14 that existed entirely within the city limits of LaGrange. Between June 1963 and the beginning of 1966, it was established, concurrent with US 29 Bus., starting at an intersection with US 27/SR 1/SR 14 Alt./SR 219 (Hamilton Road/Franklin Road) and US 29/SR 14/SR 109 (Broad Street/Franklin Road). US 29 Bus./SR 14 Conn. traveled east-northeast on Greenville Street, concurrent with SR 109. Then, they split off of SR 109 and curved to the north-northeast to a second intersection with US 29/SR 14 (Commerce Avenue/Hogansville Road). Between the beginning of 1974 and the beginning of 1977, both US 29 Bus. and SR 14 Conn. were decommissioned.

The entire route was in LaGrange, Troup County.

mi	km	Destinations	Notes
		US 27 / SR 1 / SR 14 Alt. west / SR 219 (Hamilton Road / Franklin Road) / US 29 / SR 14 / SR 109 west (Broad Street / Franklin Road) / US 29 Bus. begins	Southern terminus of US 29 Bus./SR 14 Conn.; western terminus of SR 14 Alt.; south end of US 29 Bus. and SR 109 concurrencies
		SR 109 east (Greenville Street)	North end of SR 109 concurrency
		US 29 / SR 14 (Commerce Avenue / Hogansville Road) / US 29 Bus. ends	Northern terminus of US 29 Bus./SR 14 Conn.; north end of US 29 Bus. concurrency
1.000 mi = 1.609 km; 1.000 km = 0.621 mi: Concurrency terminus

=== LaGrange connector route ===
State Route 14 Connector
- Location: LaGrange
- Length: 1.12 mi (1.80 km)
- Existed: 1994–present

State Route 14 Connector (SR 14 Conn.) is a 1.12-mile-long (1.80 km) connector route of SR 14 that exists entirely within the city limits of LaGrange. It is known as Broad Street from its western terminus to West LaFayette Square/Church Street. It is known as North LaFayette Square from there to Main Street. It is known as Greenville Street from that point to its eastern terminus. The western end of the highway serves as the northern and western edge of LaGrange College. Between Waverly Way and Gordon Street, it is also the centerpiece of the Broad Street Historic District, and has a concurrency with SR 219 from Greenwood Street to Morgan Street (US 27/US 29/SR 1/SR 14).

The roadway that would eventually become SR 14 Conn. was established at least as early as 1919 as part of US 29/SR 14. Between September 1921 and October 1926, this segment had a "completed hard surface". In 1937, SR 109 was placed on a concurrency with US 29/SR 14. In 1994, US 29/SR 14/SR 109 was shifted southward, onto Vernon Street. The former path was redesignated as SR 14 Conn.

The entire route is in LaGrange, Troup County.

mi	km	Destinations	Notes
0.000	0.000	US 29 / SR 14 / SR 109 (Vernon Street)	Western terminus; no left turn allowed from US 29 north/SR 14 north/SR 109 east to SR 14 Conn.
0.802	1.291	SR 219 north (Greenwood Street) – Franklin	Western end of SR 219 concurrency
1.119	1.801	US 27 / US 29 / SR 1 / SR 14 / SR 219 south (Morgan Street)	Eastern terminus; eastern end of SR 219 concurrency
1.000 mi = 1.609 km; 1.000 km = 0.621 mi: Concurrency terminus; Incomplete access

=== LaGrange spur route ===
State Route 14 Spur
- Location: LaGrange
- Length: 4.29 mi (6.90 km)
- Existed: 1971–present

State Route 14 Spur (SR 14 Spur) is a 4.29-mile-long (6.90 km) spur route of SR 14 in the southeastern part of LaGrange, in Troup County. It connects US 27 in the southern part of the city with US 29/SR 14 northeast of the city.

It begins at an intersection with US 27/SR 1 (Hamilton Road). It reaches SR 109 (Lafayette Parkway) just over 1 mile (1.6 km) before meeting its northern terminus, an intersection with US 29/SR 14 (Hogansville Road).

SR 14 Spur is not part of the National Highway System, a system of roadways important to the nation's economy, defense, and mobility.

In 1971, SR 14 Spur was established on its current path. Sometime between 2019 and 2026, SR 14 Spur was truncated to its current length; it previously extended further westward from its southern terminus via Davis Road to connect with SR 219 (Whitesville Road).

The entire route is in LaGrange, Troup County.

mi	km	Destinations	Notes
0.000	0.000	US 27 / SR 1 (Hamilton Road) to I-85 / I-185 – Pine Mountain, West Point	Southern terminus
3.225	5.190	SR 109 (Lafayette Parkway) to I-85 / I-185 – LaGrange, Greenville	
4.293	6.909	US 29 / SR 14 (Hogansville Road) – LaGrange, Hogansville	Northern terminus
1.000 mi = 1.609 km; 1.000 km = 0.621 mi

=== Palmetto–Red Oak alternate route ===
State Route 14 Alternate
- Location: Palmetto–Red Oak
- Length: 13.72 mi (22.08 km)
- Existed: 2007–present

State Route 14 Alternate (SR 14 Alt.) is a 13.72-mile-long (22.08 km) alternate route of SR 14 that exists entirely within the southern and southeastern parts of Fulton County. It connects Palmetto with Red Oak, located southwest of Atlanta. It is concurrent with US 29 Alt. for its entire length.

It begins at an intersection with US 29/SR 14 (Main Street) in Palmetto. This intersection marks the northern end of US 29/SR 14's concurrency with SR 154, with which US 29 Alt./SR 14 Alt. begins concurrent. The three highways travel north on a nearly due-north direction, until they reach SR 70 (South Fulton Parkway). There, the alternate routes turn to the right, toward Atlanta. The concurrency heads northeast, passing Cedar Grove Lake, and intersects SR 92 (Campbellton–Fairburn Road). They pass South Wind Golf Course and curve to a nearly due-east direction. In Red Oak, they have an interchange with US 29/SR 14 (Roosevelt Highway). Here, both US 29 Alternate/SR 14 Alternate meet their northern terminus, and the roadway continues as SR 14 Conn.

All of SR 14 Alt., from the eastern end of the SR 154 concurrency to its eastern terminus, is included as part of the National Highway System, a system of routes determined to be the most important for the nation's economy, mobility, and defense.

The roadway that would eventually become SR 14 Alt. was proposed in 1992 from SR 154 north-northwest of Palmetto to SR 14 Spur west of Red Oak. The next year, this road was completed. It wasn't until 2007 that US 29 Alt./SR 14 Alt. was designated on its entire current path.

The entire route is in Fulton County.

Location	mi	km	Destinations	Notes
Palmetto	0.000	0.000	US 29 / SR 14 / SR 154 west (Roosevelt Highway) / US 29 Alt. begins – Newnan, Atlanta	Southern terminus; southern end of US 29 Alt. and SR 154 concurrencies
	3.606	5.803	SR 70 (South Fulton Parkway) / SR 154 east (Cascade–Palmetto Highway)	Northern end of SR 154 concurrency
	7.585	12.207	SR 92 (Campbellton–Fairburn Road) to I-85 – Union City, Douglasville, Wolf Creek Amphitheater	
Red Oak	13.261	21.342	US 29 (Roosevelt Highway / SR 14) – Union City, Atlanta	Interchange
Red Oak	13.715	22.072	US 29 Alt. ends / SR 14 Conn. east – College Park	Northern terminus; northern end of US 29 Alt. concurrency; northern terminus of US 29 Alt.; western terminus of SR 14 Conn.
1.000 mi = 1.609 km; 1.000 km = 0.621 mi: Concurrency terminus

=== Red Oak spur route ===
State Route 14 Spur
- Location: Red Oak
- Existed: 1963–2007

State Route 14 Spur (SR 14 Spur) was a spur route of SR 14 that existed in Red Oak. Between June 1960 and June 1963, it was established from US 29/SR 14 southwest of Red Oak north-northeast and east-southeast to another intersection with US 29/SR 14. Then, it headed in an easterly direction to Interstate 85 (I-85) and north-northwest to US 29/SR 14 east of Red Oak. In 2007, it was redesignated as SR 14 Connector.

The entire route was in Fulton County.

Location	mi	km	Destinations	Notes
			US 29 / SR 14	Western terminus
Red Oak			US 29 / SR 14	
Red Oak			I-85 (SR 403)	
Red Oak			US 29 / SR 14	Eastern terminus
1.000 mi = 1.609 km; 1.000 km = 0.621 mi

=== Red Oak–College Park connector route ===
State Route 14 Connector
- Location: Red Oak–College Park
- Length: 2.80 mi (4.51 km)
- Existed: 2007–present

State Route 14 Connector (SR 14 Conn.) is a 2.80-mile-long (4.51 km) connector route of SR 14 in southern Fulton County. Its western terminus is at an interchange with US 29/SR 14 (Roosevelt Highway) in Red Oak, where the roadway continues as US 29 Alt./SR 14 Alt. (South Fulton Parkway), it becomes a state maintained freeway. A short distance later, it enters College Park. At the southwest interchange of I-85 and I-285, it becomes their collector/distributor roads, which continue east through the SR 279 interchange to end at the northeast split of I-85/285.

All of SR 14 Spur is included as part of the National Highway System, a system of roadways important to the nation's economy, defense, and mobility.

The roadway that would eventually become SR 14 Conn. was established between June 1960 and June 1963, as SR 14 Spur from US 29/SR 14 southwest of Red Oak north-northeast and east-southeast to another intersection with US 29/SR 14. It then traveled easterly to I-85 and then north-northwest to US 29/SR 14 east of Red Oak. In 1993, the western terminus was truncated to the middle junction with US 29/SR 14. In 2007, it was redesignated as SR 14 Conn.

The entire route is in Fulton County.

Location	mi	km	Destinations	Notes
Red Oak	0.000	0.000	US 29 / SR 14 / US 29 Alt. south / SR 14 Alt. south – Fairburn, Palmetto	Western terminus; northern terminus of US 29 Alt./SR 14 Alt.
Red Oak	0.751	1.209	Buffington Road	No access from SR 14 Conn. eastbound to Buffington Road or from Buffington Road to SR 14 Conn. westbound
College Park	1.098	1.767	I-85 south (SR 403) – Columbus, Montgomery	Exit for southbound lanes of I-85; no ramp for northbound I-85
College Park	1.596	2.569	I-285 west (SR 407) – Birmingham, Chattanooga	Exit for westbound lanes of I-285; no ramp for eastbound I-285
College Park	2.377	3.825	SR 279 (Old National Highway)	
College Park	2.797	4.501	I-85 north (SR 403) / I-285 east (SR 407) / SR 139 (Riverdale Road) – Macon	Eastern terminus; exit ramps for I-85 northbound and I-285 eastbound, exit 62; no ramps for I-85 southbound or I-285 westbound
1.000 mi = 1.609 km; 1.000 km = 0.621 mi: Incomplete access

== See also ==
- Transportation in Atlanta
