= Georgia State Route 166 =

Highway in Georgia

State Route 166
- SR 166; mainline in red, connector in blue

Route information
- Maintained by GDOT
- Length: 63.4 mi (102.0 km)
- Existed: 1940–present

Major junctions
- West end: SR 46 at the Alabama state line west of Bowdon
- US 27 / SR 1 / US 27 Alt. / SR 16 in Carrollton; I-285 in Atlanta; US 29 / SR 154 in East Point; I-75 / I-85 in Atlanta
- East end: Lakewood Avenue in southeast Atlanta

Location
- Country: United States
- State: Georgia
- Counties: Carroll, Douglas, Fulton

Highway system
- Georgia State Highway System; Interstate; US; State; Special
← SR 165	→ SR 167
← SR 419	→ SR 421
← SR 413	→ SR 415

State Route 166 (SR 166) is a state highway in the U.S. state of Georgia. It connects the Alabama state line with the city of Atlanta. The highway travels through Carrollton, McWhorter, and East Point. Except for the Carrollton and East Point/Atlanta areas, the highway is fairly rural. In Atlanta, it has a limited-access freeway portion that is known as the Arthur B. Langford Jr. Parkway (formerly named the Lakewood Freeway).

SR 166 was originally the Georgia segment of U.S. Route 78S (US 78S), which was later redesignated as US 78 Alt. The Lakewood Freeway portion of this highway was, at one time, slated to become designated as Interstate 420 (I-420), but that project was cancelled.

== Route description ==
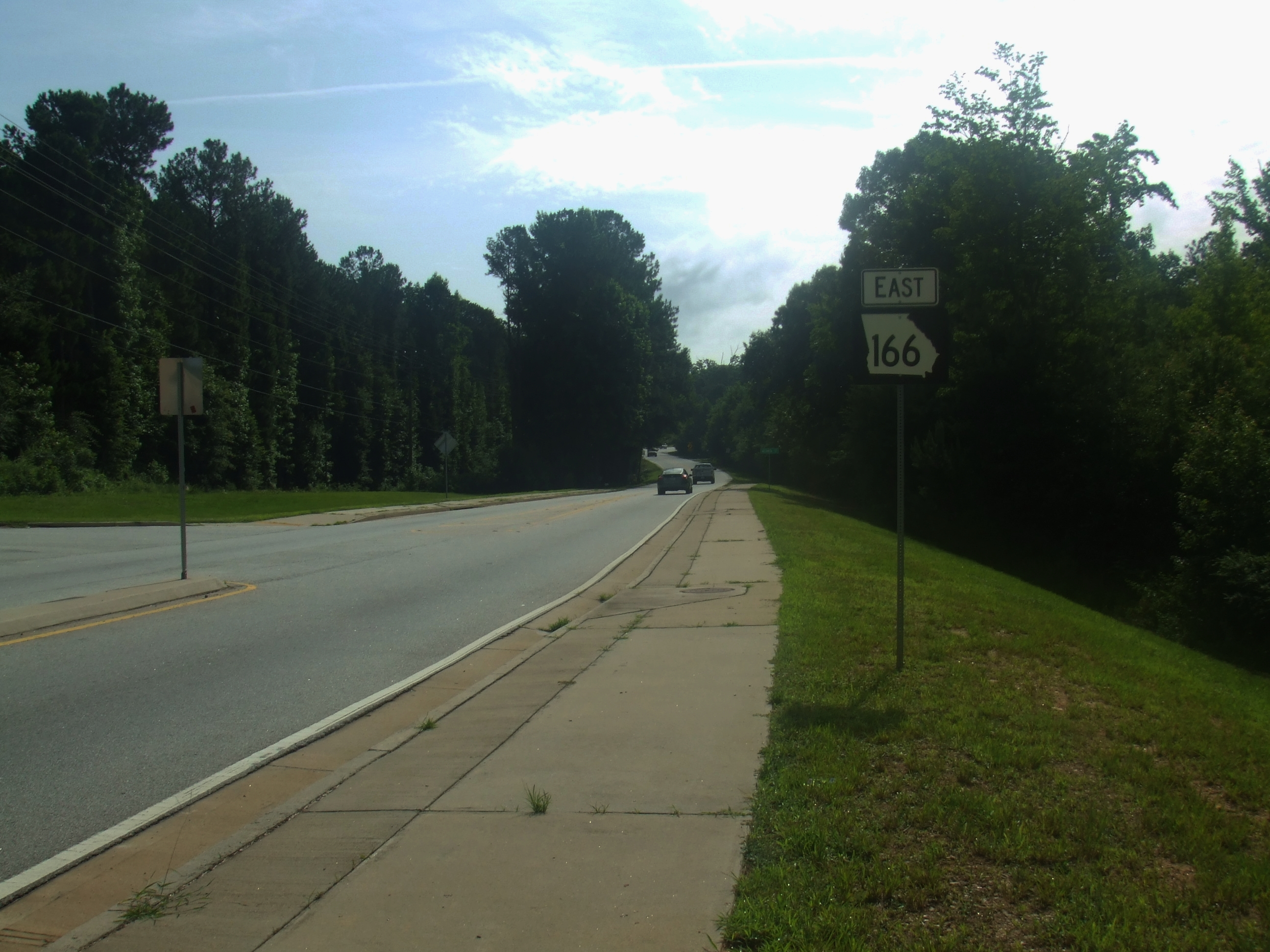
SR 166 in Douglas County

=== Carroll County ===
SR 166 begins at the Alabama state line, on the northeastern edge of Ranburne, Alabama, where the roadway continues as Alabama State Route 46 (Main Street). It travels to the northeast, through Carroll County. After curving to an east-northeast direction, and then beginning an east-southeast routing, it crosses over Big Indian Creek. The highway enters Bowdon and curves back to the east-northeast just before intersecting the northern terminus of Elm Street. Just to the east of Griffins Alley, it curves to a due-east direction and intersects SR 100 (Wedowee Street/North Carroll Street). Almost immediately, the highway travels to the northeast. After leaving the city limits of Bowdon, and just before an intersection with Dixson Road and West Jonesville Road, SR 166 begins to curve to an easterly direction. It passes just north of Anderson Lake shortly before crossing over the Little Tallapoosa River. Nearly 2 miles (3.2 km) later, it enters the city limits of Carrollton. At an intersection with Maple Street, which leads to downtown Carrollton, SR 166 turns to the right onto what is essentially a bypass of the main part of the city. It passes to the south of Sunset Hills Country Club and then reaches the Wayne Shackelford Interchange with US 27/SR 1/SR 16 (Martha Berry Highway). SR 166 continues to the east-northeast, concurrent with SR 16, as well as US 27 Alt., which begins at that interchange. The three highways curve to the northeast and travel to the southeast of Richards Lake. At an intersection with Newnan Road, US 27 Alt./SR 16 depart to the southeast, while SR 166 continues to the northeast. Just after Old Newnan Road, it curves to a due-north direction. Just to the east of Lake Carroll, it intersects the eastern terminus of SR 166 Conn. (Northside Drive). At this intersection, SR 166 turns to the right, traveling northeast on Bankhead Highway. At an intersection with the southern terminus of SR 61 (Carrollton-Villa Rica Highway), SR 166/Bankhead Highway turn right and resume their eastward trek. They weave through rural portions of the county. At the Douglas county line, the Bankhead Highway name ends and the J. Ebb Duncan Memorial Highway name begins.

=== Douglas County ===
SR 166 continues winding its way through mainly farmland and rural areas on its way to McWhorter. Here, it intersects SR 5 (Bill Arp Road) by way of a traffic circle. A short distance after crossing over the Dog River, the highway begins paralleling the western shore of the Chattahoochee River. It travels through mostly wooded land on its way to an intersection with SR 70/SR 92/SR 154 (Campbellton-Fairburn Road). The four-highway concurrency travels to the north-northeast, bypassing the Boundary Waters Aquatic Center. The highways reach an intersection with Fairburn Road, where SR 92 departs to the north. At this same intersection, SR 70/SR 154/SR 166 turn right and travel to the southeast. They curve to the east-southeast and cross over the Chattahoochee River into southern Fulton County on the Dick Lane Bridge.

=== Fulton County ===
SR 70/SR 154/SR 166 continue to the east-southeast for about 1 mile (1.6 km), where SR 70 departs the concurrency by turning left onto Fulton Industrial Boulevard SW. SR 154/SR 166 curve to the northeast and gradually travel in more of an eastern direction and enter Sandtown. Here, they intersect SR 6 (Camp Creek Parkway). Just over 0.5 miles (0.80 km) later, they pass Sandtown Middle School and Asa Philip Elementary School. After the schools is an entrance to Sandtown Park. The highways curve to the southeast and leave the city limits of Sandtown and enter those of Atlanta. They pass Southwest Atlanta Christian Academy and just north of Ben Hill Park. Less than 0.5 miles (0.80 km) later, the Arthur B. Langford Jr. Parkway designation begins, and then they have an interchange with Interstate 285 (I-285; Atlanta Bypass). Almost immediately, SR 154/SR 166 pass the Greenbriar Mall and have an interchange with Greenbriar Parkway. Just over 2 miles (3.2 km) later, along the Atlanta-East Point city line, they have an interchange with DeLowe Drive and Stanton Road. The highways enter East Point proper and have an interchange with US 29/SR 14/SR 139 (although the last two are not signed on the exit signs. At this interchange, SR 154 departs the concurrency to the north. SR 166 re-enters Atlanta and has an interchange with Sylvan Road and Cleveland Avenue. About 0.5 miles (0.80 km) later is an interchange with Perkerson Road, which leads to US 19/US 41/SR 3 (Metropolitan Parkway). SR 3 is not signed on the exit sign. Almost immediately is an interchange with I-75/I-85 (Downtown Connector). Approximately 0.8 miles (1.3 km) later, SR 166 and the Langford Parkway meet their eastern terminus, and interchange with Lakewood Avenue SW.

== History ==
=== 1920s and 1930s ===
The road that would eventually become SR 166 was established in 1920 as part of SR 34 from Carrollton to just northeast of the city (at today's intersection of SR 166 and SR 61). By the end of the third quarter of 1921, SR 16 was designated from the Alabama state line, west of Bowdon to Carrollton. By late 1926, SR 16 and SR 34 were redesignated as a southern branch of SR 8. In 1927, US 78 split into two divided routes, with US 78S being designated from Heflin, Alabama to just northeast of Carrollton, via Bowdon and Carrollton, on the southern branch of SR 8.

By 1932, US 78S/SR 8 were paved from Carrollton to just northeast of town. In the middle of 1934, US 78S/SR 8 were paved from the Alabama state line to about Bowdon. By November of that year, US 78S was redesignated as US 78 Alt. In early 1936, US 78S/SR 8 were paved from Bowdon to Carrollton. In August 1938, SR 41 was designated along the current path of SR 70 on the east side of the Chattahoochee River.

=== 1940s to 1960s ===
At the end of 1940, SR 166 was designated from Carrollton to the SR 92 intersection northwest of Fairburn (this intersection currently also carries SR 70 and SR 154, as well). By April, it was extended across the Chattahoochee River and paralleled SR 41 to the east as it entered Atlanta on Campbellton Road, and intersected US 29 at Dill Avenue, farther north than it does today. Prior to the next year, all of the Fulton County section of SR 166 was paved. By the end of 1946, SR 41 was redesignated as SR 154. SR 92 and SR 166 traveled concurrently (as they do today). SR 166 crossed the Chattahoochee River farther to the north than it used to. SR 154 and SR 166 traveled concurrently from just east of the river to about the current SR 6 intersection. By the beginning of 1948, the southern branch of SR 8 was redesignated as SR 8 Alternate. Also, SR 166 was paved from the northern SR 92 intersection to the Chattahoochee River.

In either 1952 or 1953, US 78 Alt. was decommissioned. By the middle of 1954, an extension of SR 74 was designated along SR 154/SR 166 west of Atlanta. By the middle of 1955, SR 8 Alternate was redesignated as SR 166 from the Alabama state line to northeast of Carrollton. Also, SR 166 was paved from northeast of Carrollton to McWhorter.

By the middle of 1960, all of the then-current length of SR 166 was paved. By 1966, the limited-access portion of SR 166 was under construction from I-285 to US 19/US 41/SR 3. Later that year, the construction was complete along that section. In 1967. the extension of SR 70 was renumbered as part of SR 70. In 1969, the limited access portion was proposed to be extended from its current eastern terminus, at Lakewood Avenue, past SR 54 and McDonough Boulevard (today's SR 42 Spur) to end at a proposed piece of SR 400.

=== 1970s to 2010s ===
By the beginning of 1978, the proposed extension (and possibly the rest of the limited-access portion) was proposed to be designated as I-420. Also, the proposed eastern terminus was extended to I-20 between its crossing of Sugar Creek and its interchange with Gresham Road. Along the way, the proposed interchange with SR 400 was changed to one with the northern terminus of I-675. In 1985, the proposed northern part of I-675 and the I-420 proposal were both removed from the GDOT maps. Also, the yearly map reverted the eastern terminus back to I-75/I-85. In 1992, SR 154 was rerouted on a concurrency with SR 166, from just west of the Chattahoochee River to the interchange with US 29, as it does today. In 2007, SR 70 was partially rerouted from the east side of the Chattahoochee River to follow the SR 92/SR 154/SR 166 concurrency on the west side of the river and cross back over west of Atlanta. It wasn't until the 2015-2016 edition of GDOT's state map that the section from I-75/I-85 to Lakewood Avenue was returned to the map.

=== Miscellaneous notes ===
SR 166 was originally supposed to extend (as I-420) from I-20 near Douglasville in the west to the DeKalb County seat of Decatur in the east. The eastern portion of this was fought bitterly by residents in court, and was eventually cancelled, along with a number of other interstate highways in Atlanta.

In 1995, the Georgia Senate moved to rename the then-Lakewood Freeway to the Arthur Langford, Jr. Memorial Parkway in honor of the former Atlanta City Councilman and Georgia State Senator. Since 2003, GDOT has widened SR 166 between Greenbriar Parkway and Perkerson Road.

== Major intersections ==
County	Location	mi	km	Destinations	Notes
Cleburne	Ranburne	0.0	0.0	SR 46 west (Main Street) – Heflin	Western terminus at the Alabama state line
Carroll	Bowdon	3.8	6.1	SR 100 (Wedowee Street / North Carroll Street) – Franklin, Tallapoosa	
Carroll	Carrollton	14.9	24.0	US 27 / SR 1 (Martha Berry Highway) / US 27 Alt. begins / SR 16 west – LaGrange	Western end of US 27 Alt./SR 16 concurrency; northern terminus of US 27 Alt.; Wayne Shackelford Interchange
Carroll	Carrollton	17.0	27.4	US 27 Alt. south / SR 16 east (Newnan Road) – Whitesburg, West Georgia Technical College	Eastern end of US 27 Alt./SR 16 concurrency
Carroll	Carrollton	18.9	30.4	SR 166 Conn. west (Northside Drive)	Eastern terminus of SR 166 Conn.
Carroll		21.8	35.1	SR 61 north (Carrollton–Villa Rica Highway) – Villa Rica	Southern terminus of SR 61
Douglas	McWhorter	32.3	52.0	SR 5 north (Bill Arp Road) – Douglasville	Western end of SR 5 concurrency on traffic circle
Douglas	McWhorter	32.3	52.0	SR 5 north (Bill Arp Road) – Whitesburg	Eastern end of SR 5 concurrency on traffic circle
Douglas		43.0	69.2	SR 70 south / SR 92 south / SR 154 west (Campbellton–Fairburn Road) – Campbellton	Western end of SR 70, SR 92, and SR 154 concurrencies
Douglas		46.6	75.0	SR 92 north (Fairburn Road) – Douglasville	Eastern end of SR 92 concurrency
Chattahoochee River		48.4	77.9	Dick Lane Bridge	
Fulton		49.4	79.5	SR 70 north (Fulton Industrial Boulevard SW) – Atlanta	Eastern end of SR 70 concurrency
Fulton	Sandtown	51.8	83.4	SR 6 (Camp Creek Parkway)	
Fulton	Atlanta	56.9	91.6	I-285 (Atlanta Bypass / SR 407) – Montgomery, Macon, Birmingham, Chattanooga	I-285 exit 5; Langford Parkway designation begins just west of this interchange.
Fulton	Atlanta	57.5	92.5	Greenbriar Parkway to Campbellton Road	Interchange
Fulton	Atlanta–East Point line	59.6	95.9	DeLowe Drive / Stanton Road	Interchange
Fulton	East Point	61.3	98.7	US 29 / SR 154 north (SR 14 / SR 139) – Tyler Perry Studios	Interchange; eastern end of SR 154 concurrency
Fulton	Atlanta	61.9	99.6	Sylvan Road / Cleveland Avenue	Interchange
Fulton	Atlanta	62.4	100.4	Perkerson Road to US 19 / US 41 (Metropolitan Parkway)	Interchange
Fulton	Atlanta	62.6	100.7	I-75 / I-85 (Downtown Connector / SR 295 / SR 401 / SR 403) – Macon, Atl Airport, Downtown Atlanta	I-75/I-85 exit 243
Fulton	Atlanta	63.4	102.0	Lakewood Avenue SW – Aaron's Amphitheatre	Eastern terminus of SR 166/Langford Parkway; interchange
1.000 mi = 1.609 km; 1.000 km = 0.621 mi: Concurrency terminus

== Related routes ==
=== Interstate 420 ===
Interstate 420
- State Route 414
- Location: Atlanta
- Length: 5.40 mi (8.69 km)
- Existed: 1983–1986

Interstate 420 (I-420) was an Auxiliary Interstate Highway that was planned to split off I-285 on the west side of Atlanta, then continue east to a point south of downtown Atlanta, merging at an interchange with proposed I-675 and traveling northeastward on to I-20 near Gresham Park. It would have had a length of 5.40 miles (8.69 km). The only portion of it actually built was SR 166, known as Lakewood Freeway and now, Langford Parkway. The portion east of I-75/I-85 was never built, due to public opposition from communities in its path. I-675 was built, however, and currently travels between I-75 near Stockbridge in Henry County to I-285 near Panthersville in DeKalb County. If I-420 had been built, it would have had the hidden designation of State Route 414. I-420 was proposed in 1978, and was approved to be designated on September 29, 1983; had it been built, it would have cost $96.4 million.

=== Carrollton connector route ===
State Route 166 Connector
- Location: Carrollton
- Length: 3.7 mi (6.0 km)
- Existed: 2004–

State Route 166 Connector (SR 166 Conn.) is a 3.7-mile-long (6.0 km) connector of SR 166 that is mostly within the city limits of Carrollton. It is entirely within Carroll County. It is known as Linda Lane from its western terminus to its intersection with SR 113 and Northside Drive from SR 113 to its eastern terminus.

SR 166 Conn. begins at an intersection with US 27/SR 1 on the northern edge of Carrollton, where the roadway continues as Columbia Drive. The highway leaves the city limits and travels on a nearly due east direction until it intersects SR 113. It travels in a southeasterly direction and crosses over the Little Tallapoosa River, where it re-enters the city limits of Carrollton. After a gradual curve to the south-southeast, it meets its eastern terminus, an intersection with the SR 166 mainline.

The highway was proposed in 1998 on a routing from Shady Grove Road to its current eastern terminus. In 2000, the proposal was extended to include all of its current length. In 2001, it was proposed to be numbered as SR 166 Spur, on at least the US 27/SR 1-to-SR 113 segment. In 2004, it was completed, and signed as SR 166 Conn.

The entire route is in Carroll County.

Location	mi	km	Destinations	Notes
Carrollton	0.0	0.0	US 27 / SR 1 (Bremen Highway)	Western terminus; roadway continues as Columbia Drive.
	0.9	1.4	SR 113	
Carrollton	3.7	6.0	SR 166 (Bankhead Avenue/Northside Drive)	Eastern terminus
1.000 mi = 1.609 km; 1.000 km = 0.621 mi

== See also ==
- Transportation in Atlanta
