= Georgia State Route 92 =

State highway in Georgia

State Route 92
- SR 92 highlighted in red

Route information
- Maintained by GDOT
- Length: 101.72 mi (163.70 km)
- Existed: January 1932–present

Major junctions
- South end: US 19 Bus. / US 41 Bus. / SR 16 in Griffin
- US 19 / US 41 / SR 3 in Griffin; US 29 / SR 14 in Fairburn; I-20 in Douglasville; US 78 / SR 5 / SR 8 in Douglasville; US 278 / SR 6 in Hiram; US 41 / SR 3 in Acworth; I-75 in Acworth; I-575 / SR 5 in Woodstock
- North end: SR 9 / SR 120 / SR 140 in Roswell

Location
- Country: United States
- State: Georgia
- Counties: Spalding, Fayette, Fulton, Douglas, Paulding, Cobb, Cherokee

Highway system
- Georgia State Highway System; Interstate; US; State; Special
← SR 91W	→ SR 93

State Route 92 (SR 92) is a 101.72-mile-long (163.70 km) state highway in the U.S. state of Georgia. Its southern terminus is an intersection with US 19 Bus./US 41 Bus./SR 16 in Griffin. Its northern terminus is an intersection with SR 9/SR 120/SR 140 in Roswell. The highway connects Griffin to Roswell, via Fayetteville, Fairburn, Douglasville, Hiram, Acworth, and Woodstock. Primarily signed from south to north, SR 92 is a rural highway that travels through three county seats. It can be seen as a western bypass of the city of Atlanta.

== Route description ==
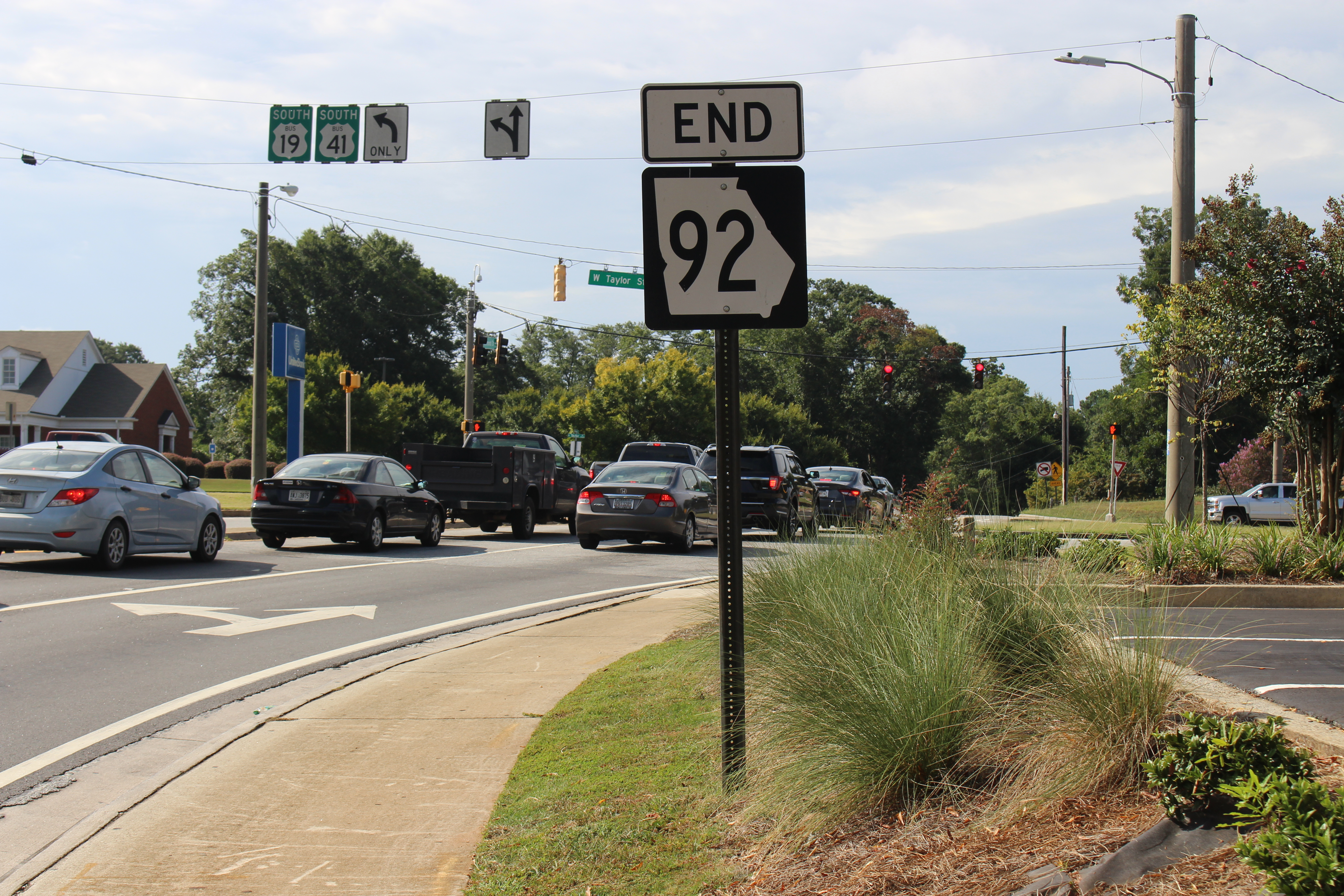
Southern terminus in Griffin

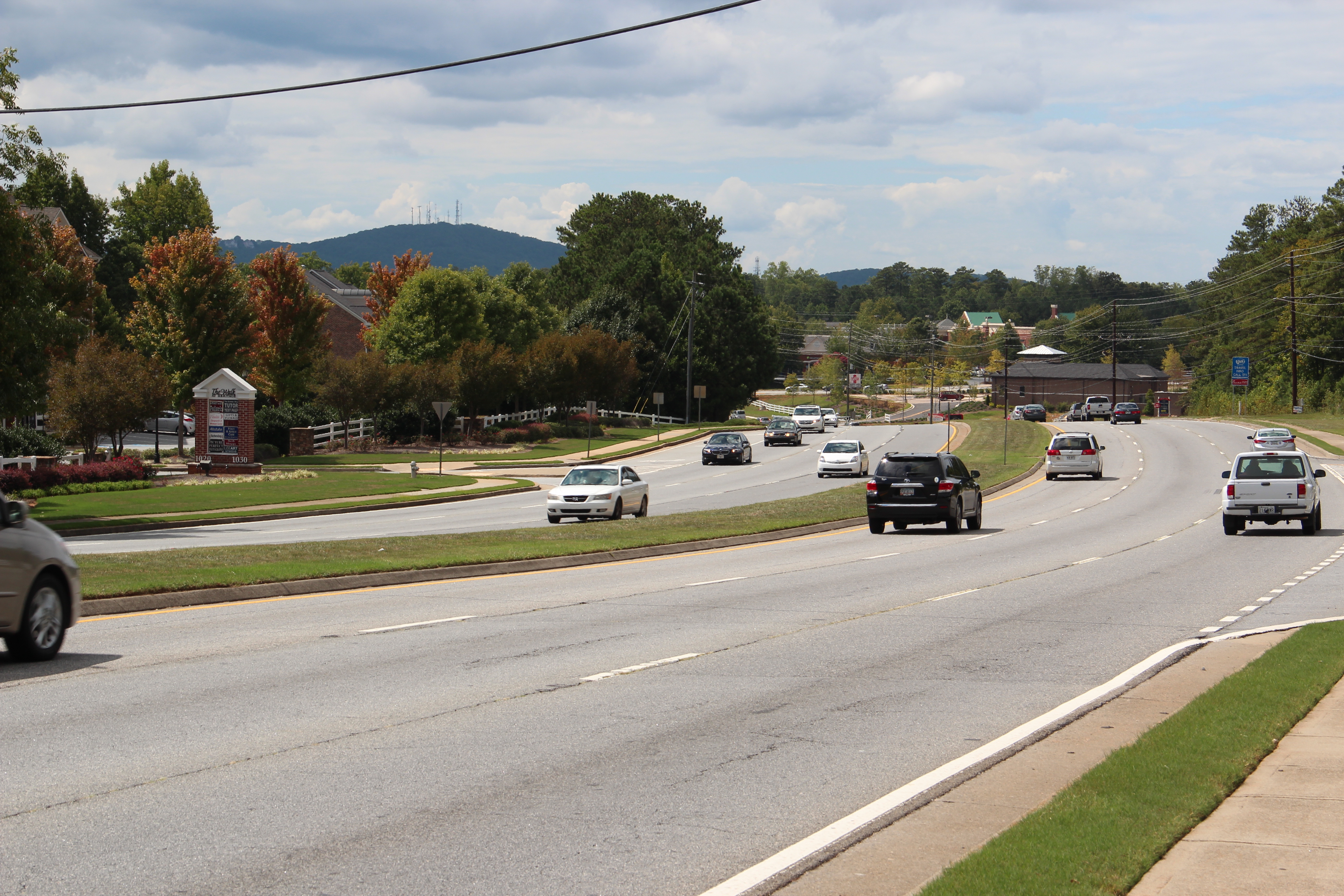
State Route 92 in Roswell

The highway begins at the intersection between West McIntosh Road and North Expressway, the latter carrying US 19/US 41/SR 3, on the north side of Griffin. SR 92 runs westward away from the intersection in the middle of a commercial area of the city. The highway is a divided as it passes through residential subdivisions to exit town. Turning northwesterly on Fayetteville Road, SR 92 follows a two-lane roadway through rural Spalding County, running through a combination of woods and farm fields. The highway rounds the northern end of Heads Creek Reservoir before crossing the Flint River and into Fayette County. Past the river, the highway turns northward, running next to Lake Horton before entering the town of Woolsey. Continuing northward, the landscape transitions to residential subdivisions again as the highway enters the outskirts of Fayetteville. SR 92 follows Jimmie Mayfield Boulevard north before turning west onto Helen Sams Parkway, a divided highway. SR 92 turns back northward when it merges with SR 85; the two routes run concurrently northward on Glenn Street into downtown.

In downtown Fayetteville, SR 85/SR 92 meets a pair of one-way streets that carry the two directions of SR 54. Further north, SR 92 separates from SR 85 when it turns northwesterly along Forest Avenue to exit downtown. It meanders north and northwesterly through subdivisions to exit the city near a pair of small airports, Coleman Field and McLendon Airport. SR 92 crosses into the southwestern corner of Fulton County near Fairburn, and it runs through a mixture of industrial parks and commercial zones. The highway passes over I-85, without an interchange, and crosses rail lines owned by CSX Transportation. SR 92 follows Campbellton Street through downtown, intersecting US 29/SR 14 in the middle of town. The highway then follows Campbellton–Fairburn Road north of town through an intersection with US 29 Alt./SR 14 Alt. (Fulton Parkway). At Campbellton, SR 92 merges with SR 154 to cross the Chattahoochee River and enter Douglas County.

On the north bank of the Chattahoochee, SR 166 joins the concurrency, and the merged highway continues northward away from the river. SR 154 and SR 166 separate to turn to the southeast, and SR 92 continues its northward course along Fairburn Road into Douglasville. On the south side of town, the highway arcs westward and crosses I-20 at that freeway's exit 37. SR 92 passes into downtown and merges with to run westward with US 78/Georgia State Route 5 /SR 8 for several blocks before turn northward again. North of town, the highway crosses into Paulding County for the first time. There it follows Hiram–Douglasville Highway north into Hiram where it crosses a line of the Norfolk Southern Railway and intersects US 278/SR 6 (Jimmy Lee Smith Parkway).

North of Hiram, SR 92 meets SR 360 and SR 120 in a pair of intersections while running northward through residential subdivisions on the western edge of the Atlanta metropolitan area. The roadway follows the county line and then crosses into Cobb County. It then returns to Paulding County again near the Pickett's Mill Battlefield. The state route follows Dallas–Acworth Highway back into Cobb County and past Allatoona High School before meeting US 41/SR 3 (Cobb Parkway). SR 92 turns southeasterly onto Cobb Parkway to cross one arm of Lake Allatoona. SR 92 leaves the parkway to turn northward across the dividing line between Lake Allatoona, and Lake Acworth, entering Acworth. The highway follows Lake Acworth Drive through town and parallel to I-75 before crossing that freeway and entering Cherokee County, Georgia.

In Cherokee County, SR 92 turns eastward along Alabama Road. The highway crosses I-575 in Woodstock. As passing through exit 7 of that freeway, SR 92 then arcs to the southeast, crossing the extreme northeastern corner of Cobb County to enter Fulton County near Mountain Park. The highway continues southeasterly into Roswell where it terminates at an intersection with SR 9/SR 120 (Alpharetta Highway) and SR 140 (Holcomb Bridge Road).

The following portions of SR 92 are part of the National Highway System, a system of routes determined to be the most important for the nation's economy, mobility, and defense:

- From its southern terminus in the central part of Griffin to the northern end of the US 19/US 41/SR 3 in the northern part of the city
- From SR 138 in Fairburn to the northern end of the US 41/SR 3 concurrency in Acworth
- From I-75 in Acworth to its northern terminus

== History ==
=== 1920s through 1940s ===
The roadway that would eventually become SR 92 was established at least as early as 1919 as part of SR 42 from Fayetteville to Fairburn. By the end of 1921, SR 42's path was shifted to the east. Its former path was redesignated as part of SR 54.

By the end of 1931, the southern half of this segment of SR 54 had a "sand clay or top soil" surface. In January 1932, SR 92 was established from US 78/SR 8 in Douglasville to SR 6 in Hiram. In December 1933, SR 92 was extended south-southeast to Fairburn with a ferry over the Chattahoochee River. The next year, SR 54's segment from Fayetteville to Fairburn was shifted southward. SR 92 was extended from Fairburn to Griffin, absorbing this segment. By the end of the year, the portion in Griffin had a completed hard surface. A portion northwest of Griffin, as well as the Fulton County portion of the Fairburn–Douglasville segment, was under construction. Early in 1935, the northern half of the Douglas County portion of the Fairburn–Douglasville segment was under construction. By the middle of the year, the southern half of this portion was also under construction. About a year later, a portion northwest of Griffin had a sand clay or top soil surface. A few months later, nearly the entire Douglas County portion of the Fairburn–Douglasville segment had completed grading, but was not surfaced. In 1938, a portion north of the Douglas–Paulding county line was under construction. By the middle of 1939, the northern half of the Fulton County portion of the Fairburn–Douglasville segment was under construction. Also, the southern part of the Douglas County portion of this segment had completed grading, but was not surfaced. Around the middle of the year, SR 92 was established from US 278/SR 6 in Dallas to US 41/SR 3 in Acworth. However, there is no indication if the highway was concurrent with SR 6 from Hiram to Dallas or if this was a completely separate segment. The crossing of the Chattahoochee River was indicated to have "no bridge or ferry". The northern half of the Fulton County portion of the Fairburn–Douglasville segment, as well as a portion from Douglasville to just south of Hiram, had completed grading, but was not surfaced. At the end of the year, a portion northeast of Dallas was under construction.

In the early part of 1940, this segment had completed grading, but was not surfaced. Later that year, a portion south of Hiram had a completed hard surface. The entire Dallas–Acworth segment was under construction. Before the year ended, SR 92 was extended northeast and east to SR 5 in Woodstock. A portion of the highway northeast of Dallas had a completed hard surface. In early 1941, the crossing of the Chattahoochee River was indicated to have a ferry again. The entire Paulding County portion of the Douglasville–Hiram segment had a completed hard surface. A few months later, the Douglas County portion of the Douglasville–Hiram segment was under construction. In 1944, a small portion north-northwest of Fayetteville had a sand clay or top soil surface. By the end of 1946, the Acworth–Woodstock segment was shifted to a more northerly winding course. The Douglas County portion of the Fairburn–Douglasville segment had completed grading, but was not surfaced. Also, a portion in the vicinity of New Hope was hard surfaced. By the end of 1948, nearly the entire Griffin–Fayetteville segment, the entire Fayette County portion of the Fayetteville–Fairburn segment, and the entire Cobb County portion of the highway, had a sand clay, top soil, or stabilized earth surface. A portion from the northern end of the SR 166 concurrency to Douglasville, and then to the Douglas–Paulding county line, as well as the entire Paulding County portion of the Dallas–Acworth segment, was hard surfaced. The next year, the entire segment of the highway from Griffin to Fayetteville was hard surfaced.

=== 1950s and 1960s ===
By the end of 1951, the Fulton County portion of Fayetteville–Fairburn segment was hard surfaced. By the middle of 1955, the western half of the Acworth–Woodstock segment was hard surfaced. About two years later, the entire length of SR 92 from Griffin to the SR 154 intersection just southeast of the Fulton–Douglas county line, and from the northern SR 166 intersection southeast of Douglasville to the SR 205 intersection west-northwest of Woodstock, was paved. At the end of the decade, the ferry was removed from the crossing of the Chattahoochee River. SR 92 from the SR 154 intersection just southeast of the Fulton–Douglas county line to the northern SR 166 intersection southeast of Douglasville was paved. From the Cobb–Cherokee county line to just west of the SR 205 intersection, SR 92 had completed grading, but was not surfaced.

By the end of 1963, SR 92 was extended east and southeast to a point just southeast of the second crossing of the Cherokee–Cobb county line. This entire extension was paved. Between 1963 and 1966, the segment of SR 92 from the SR 205 intersection to Woodstock was shifted south, which removed the concurrency with SR 5. Also, an unnumbered road was built from Hiram to New Hope. The next year, the segment of SR 92 from Dallas to New Hope was shifted to the southeast, onto this unnumbered road, which connected it more directly to the rest of the highway. The old alignment was redesignated as SR 92 Spur.

=== 1970s and later ===
In 1970, an unnumbered road was built from US 278/SR 6 and SR 92 in Hiram to SR 92 in Cross Roads. In 1972, the Hiram–New Hope segment was shifted east to travel between Hiram and Cross Roads on the previously unnumbered road. SR 92's old alignment was redesignated as a northeast extension of SR 92 Spur. In 1988, SR 92 was extended southeast to Roswell.

In the 2010s and 2020s, the Georgia Department of Transportation (GDOT) undertook a multi-phase relocation and widening project for SR 92 through Douglasville, constructing a bypass route to divert through traffic around downtown and improve safety and traffic flow. The relocation work has included grade-separated crossings and road realignments, with portions of the new alignment open as traffic patterns continue to shift to the bypass.

== Major intersections ==
County	Location	mi	km	Destinations	Notes
Spalding	Griffin	0.000	0.000	US 19 Bus. south / US 41 Bus. south / SR 16 (West Taylor Street) to I-75 / I-85 – Jackson, Newnan	Southern terminus; southern end of US 19 Bus./US 41 Bus. concurrency; northern terminus of Hammond Drive
Spalding	Griffin	1.293	2.081	US 19 south / US 41 south / SR 3 south – Zebulon, Barnesville	Northern end of US 19 Bus./US 41 Bus. concurrency; northern terminus of US 19 Bus./US 41 Bus.; southern end of US 19/US 41/SR 3 concurrency; no access to US 19 south/US 41 south/SR 3 from US 19 Bus./US 41 Bus./SR 92 north; interchange
Spalding	Griffin	1.896	3.051	US 19 north / US 41 north / SR 3 north (Martin L. King Jr. Boulevard) / Mc Intosh Road east – Sunny Side, Hampton, Atlanta	Northern end of US 19/US 41/SR 3 concurrency
Fayette	Fayetteville	18.765	30.199	SR 85 south / Ramah Road west – Senoia	Southern end of SR 85 concurrency
Fayette	Fayetteville	20.065	32.291	SR 54 east (Stonewall Avenue) – Jonesboro, Historic Train Depot, Chamber of Commerce, Fayette County Development Auth.	Eastbound lanes of SR 54 on a one-way pair
Fayette	Fayetteville	20.125	32.388	SR 54 west (Lanier Avenue) – Peachtree City, Holliday–Dorsey–Fife Museum, Historic Cemetery	Westbound lanes of SR 54 on a one-way pair
Fayette	Fayetteville	20.697	33.309	SR 85 north (North Glynn Street) / Easterbrook Way east – Riverdale	Northern end of SR 85 concurrency; western terminus of Easterbrook Way
Fulton	Fairburn	30.444	48.995	Oakley Industrial Boulevard to I-85 / SR 74	Interchange
Fulton	Fairburn	32.363	52.083	US 29 south / SR 14 south (West Broad Street)	Southern end of US 29/SR 14 concurrency
Fulton	Fairburn	33.379	53.718	US 29 south / SR 14 south / SR 138 east (Beverly Engram Parkway)	Northern end of US 29/SR 14 concurrency; western terminus of SR 138
Fulton		37.225	59.908	US 29 Alt. / SR 14 Alt. (South Fulton Parkway)	
Fulton	Campbellton	41.896	67.425	SR 70 south / SR 154 west (Palmetto–Cascade Highway)	Southern end of SR 70/SR 154 concurrency
Chattahoochee River		42.416	68.262	Robert and Ardena Beasley Memorial Bridge	
Douglas		42.717	68.746	SR 166 west	Southern end of SR 166 concurrency
Douglas		46.197	74.347	SR 70 north / SR 154 east / SR 166 east / Old Lower River Road north – Atlanta	Northern end of SR 70/SR 154 and SR 166 concurrencies; southern terminus of Old Lower River Road
Douglas	Douglasville	51.536	82.939	I-20 (SR 402) – Birmingham, Atlanta	I-20 exit 37
Douglas	Douglasville	52.878	85.099	US 78 / SR 5 / SR 8 (Veterans Memorial Highway) – Villa Rica, Historic Downtown Business District	
Paulding	Hiram	61.293	98.642	SR 120 Conn. west (Hiram Sudie Road)	Eastern terminus of SR 120 Conn.; provides access to Wellstar Paulding Hospital
Paulding	Hiram	61.234	98.547	Dewey Pendley Bridge	Crossing over Grays Mill Creek
Paulding	Hiram	62.872	101.183	US 278 / SR 6 (Jimmy Lee Smith Parkway) – Dallas, Austell	Provides access to Wellstar Paulding Hospital and Paulding Northwest Atlanta Airport
Paulding		64.113	103.180	SR 360 (Macland Road) – Dallas, Macland, Marietta	
Paulding		65.368	105.200	SR 120 (Charles Hardy Parkway) – Buchanan, Marietta	Provides access to Wellstar Paulding Hospital
Cobb	No major junctions				
Paulding		71.722	115.425	Dallas–Acworth Highway south / Cedarcrest Road north – Dallas, Pickett's Mill Battlefield	Former SR 381; southern terminus of Cedarcrest Road
Cobb	Acworth	75.751	121.909	US 41 north / SR 3 north (Cobb Parkway) / Old Acworth–Dallas Highway north – Cartersville	Southern end of US 41/SR 3 concurrency; southern terminus of Old Acworth–Dallas Highway
Cobb	Acworth	76.564	123.218	Kimberly Boyd Memorial Bridge	Crossing over Lake Allatoona
Cobb	Acworth	77.246	124.315	US 41 south / SR 3 south (Cobb Parkway) – Marietta	Northern end of US 41/SR 3 concurrency
Cobb	Acworth	78.801	126.818	North Main Street – Downtown Business District, Lake Acworth	Interchange
Cobb	Acworth	78.881	126.947	Mary McCall Memorial Overpass	Crossing over North Main Street
Cherokee	Acworth	81.210	130.695	I-75 (Larry McDonald Memorial Highway / SR 401) – Atlanta, Chattanooga	I-75 exit 277
Cherokee	Woodstock	89.256	143.644	I-575 / SR 5 (Phillip Landrum Memorial Highway / SR 417) – Marietta, Canton	I-575 exit 7
Cobb	No major junctions				
Fulton	Roswell	101.721	163.704	SR 9 / SR 120 (Alpharetta Highway) / SR 140 (Holcomb Bridge Road) – Cumming, Norcross, Atlanta	Northern terminus
1.000 mi = 1.609 km; 1.000 km = 0.621 mi: Concurrency terminus

== Special routes ==
=== Hiram–New Hope connector route ===
State Route 92 Connector
- Location: Hiram–New Hope
- Existed: 1969–1979

State Route 92 Connector (SR 92 Conn.) was a connector route that existed between Hiram and New Hope. The highway that would eventually become SR 92 Conn. was established at the end of 1940 as SR 176 from SR 6 in Hiram to SR 92 in New Hope. A portion of SR 176 just west of Lost Mountain had a "sand clay, top soil, or stabilized earth" surface. By the middle of 1950, a portion just west of Lost Mountain was hard surfaced. In 1953, a portion west of Lost Mountain had completed grading, but was not surfaced. By the middle of 1955, this entire segment of SR 176 had a sand clay, topsoil, or stabilized earth surface. About two years later, it was indicated to have a "topsoil or gravel, unpaved" surface. Between 1957 and 1960, it was paved. About a decade later, the segment of SR 176 between Lost Mountain and New Hope was shifted to the northeast. Its former alignment was redesignated as SR 92 Conn. In 1979, SR 92 Conn. was redesignated as SR 120 Conn.

=== Dallas connector route ===
State Route 92 Connector
- Location: Dallas
- Existed: 1946–1950

State Route 92 Connector (SR 92 Conn.) was a connector route of SR 92 in Dallas. Between 1945 and the end of 1946, it was established from SR 6/SR 120 and SR 61 in the eastern part of the city to SR 92 in the northeast part of the city. Its entire length was hard surfaced. By the middle of 1950, it was decommissioned.

=== Dallas spur route ===
State Route 92 Spur
- Location: Dallas
- Existed: 1952–1953

State Route 92 Spur (SR 92 Spur) was a spur route of SR 92 in Dallas. In 1952, it was established from SR 6/SR 120 and SR 61 in the eastern part of the city to SR 92 in the northeastern part. The next year, it was decommissioned.

=== Dallas–Cross Roads spur ===
State Route 92 Spur
- Location: Dallas–Cross Roads
- Existed: 1966–1979

State Route 92 Spur (SR 92 Spur) was a spur route of SR 92 that existed from Dallas to Cross Roads. The roadway that would eventually become SR 92 Spur was built in 1939, when SR 92 was extended from Hiram to Acworth. By the end of 1948, the entire length of SR 92 that would become the spur route was hard surfaced. In 1966, the Dallas–New Hope segment of SR 92 was shifted to the southeast. Its old alignment became SR 92 Spur. In 1972, the Hiram–New Hope segment of SR 92 was shifted east. Its old alignment between New Hope and Cross Roads became a northeast extension of SR 92 Spur. In 1979, SR 92 Spur was redesignated as SR 381.

On April 4, 1977, Southern Airways Flight 242 attempted a landing on the stretch of highway near New Hope after hail and heavy rain shattered its windshields and destroyed its engines. The DC-9 crashed, killing the flight crew, 60 passengers, and eight people on the ground. It also destroyed a gas station, grocery store, and other structures.
