= Georgia State Route 34 =

State highway in Georgia

State Route 34
- SR 34 highlighted in red

Route information
- Maintained by GDOT
- Length: 43.6 mi (70.2 km)

Major junctions
- West end: SR 22 at the Alabama state line southwest of Waresville
- US 27 / SR 1 / SR 100 in Franklin; US 27 Alt. / US 29 / SR 14 / SR 16 in Newnan; I-85 in Newnan
- East end: SR 54 west of Peachtree City

Location
- Country: United States
- State: Georgia
- Counties: Heard, Coweta

Highway system
- Georgia State Highway System; Interstate; US; State; Special
← SR 33	→ SR 35

State Route 34 (SR 34) is a 43.6-mile-long (70.2 km) state highway that travels west-to-east through portions of Heard and Coweta counties in the west-central part of the U.S. state of Georgia. The highway connects the Alabama state line southwest of Franklin with the Peachtree City area, via Franklin and Newnan.

== Route description ==
SR 34 begins at the Alabama state line, southwest of Waresville, in Heard County, where the roadway continues to the southwest as Alabama State Route 22 (SR 22). In a curving fashion, it heads northeast to an intersection with the northern terminus of SR 219. It continues to the northeast and enters Franklin. Just inside the city limits, it begins a concurrency with SR 100. Just before the concurrency ends, the two highways cross over the Chattahoochee River on the Pleasant Theodore McCutchen Sr. Bridge. On the eastern side of the river, they diverge, with SR 34 continuing to the northeast and has an interchange with US 27/SR 1. The highway travels through a portion of Bush Head Shoals State Park. Then, it passes Turners Lake and Heard Wesley Cemetery, before entering Coweta County. The highway passes Josephs Lake and Dent Chapel Cemetery, before reaching the Rock Cabin Lake area. Right by the lake, it passes Emory Chapel Cemetery. Farther along, it curves to the east-northeast. Then, it passes Mountain Lake. Less than 3,000 feet (910 m) later, it meets the western terminus of SR 34 Byp. (Newnan By-Pass Road). The highway enters Newnan, where it intersects US 27 Alt./SR 16 (Temple Avenue). The three highways head concurrent toward the main part of town. They pass Temple Avenue Recreation Complex. In downtown, they intersect US 29/SR 14 (Jackson Street). All five highways head south. At Posey Place, SR 34 departs the concurrency and intersects the northbound lanes, where it rejoins the concurrency to the north. At Clark Street, SR 34 splits off to the northeast. A few miles farther, it meets the eastern terminus of SR 34 Byp. (this time known as Millard Farmer Industrial Boulevard. Then, it has an interchange with Interstate 85 (I-85). After that, it leaves Newnan and travels in a fairly eastern routing. In Thomas Crossroads is an intersection with SR 154 (Sharpsburg–McCollum Road). SR 34 curves to the east-southeast and reaches its eastern terminus, an intersection with SR 54 just west of Peachtree City.

The only portion of SR 34 that is part of the National Highway System, a system of routes determined to be the most important for the nation's economy, mobility, and defense, is from the central part of Newnan to its eastern terminus.

== History ==
SR 34 was established between October 1929 and June 1930, from the Alabama state line west-southwest of Franklin, east-northeast to Newnan. Between November 1946 and February 1948, it was extended east-northeast to SR 54, at its current eastern terminus. Between August 1950 and January 1952, the entire path of SR 34 was hard surfaced.

== Major intersections ==
County	Location	mi	km	Destinations	Notes
Alabama state line		0.0	0.0	Western terminus at the Alabama state line; roadway continues as SR 22 west towards Roanoke, Alabama.	
Heard		6.9	11.1	SR 219 south – LaGrange	Northern terminus of SR 219
Heard	Franklin	11.3	18.2	SR 100 north – Ephesus	Western end of SR 100 concurrency
Heard	Franklin	12.2	19.6	Pleasant Theodore McCutchen Sr. Bridge	Crossing over the Chattahoochee River
Heard	Franklin	12.4	20.0	SR 100 south – LaGrange	Eastern end of SR 100 concurrency
Heard	Franklin	13.4	21.6	US 27 / SR 1	Interchange
Coweta		28.9	46.5	SR 34 Byp. east (Newnan By-Pass Road)	Western terminus of SR 34 Byp.
Coweta	Newnan	30.9	49.7	US 27 Alt. north / SR 16 west (Temple Avenue West) – Carrollton	Western end of US 27 Alt./SR 16 concurrency
Coweta	Newnan	32.1	51.7	US 29 north / SR 14 north (Jackson Street) – Palmetto	Western end of US 29/SR 14 concurrency
Coweta	Newnan	32.2	51.8	US 27 Alt. south / US 29 south / SR 14 south / SR 16 east (Jackson Street) – Moreland, Sharpsburg	Eastern end of US 27 Alt./SR 16 and US 29/SR 14 concurrencies; one-way pair
Coweta	Newnan	32.3	52.0	US 27 Alt. north / US 29 north / SR 14 north / SR 16 west (Jefferson Street)	Eastern end of US 27 Alt./SR 16 and US 29/SR 14 concurrencies; one-way pair
Coweta	Newnan	32.4	52.1	US 27 Alt. north / US 29 north / SR 14 north / SR 16 west (Clark Street) – Carrollton, Palmetto	Eastern end of US 27 Alt./SR 16 and US 29/SR 14 concurrencies; one-way pair
Coweta	Newnan	34.9	56.2	SR 34 Byp. west (Millard Farmer Industrial Boulevard)	Eastern terminus of SR 34 Byp.
Coweta	Newnan	35.5	57.1	I-85 (SR 403) – Montgomery, Atlanta	I-85/SR 403 exit 47
Coweta	Thomas Crossroads	39.6	63.7	SR 154 (Sharpsburg–McCollum Road) – Sharpsburg, Palmetto	
Coweta		43.6	70.2	SR 54 – Sharpsburg, Peachtree City	Eastern terminus
1.000 mi = 1.609 km; 1.000 km = 0.621 mi: Concurrency terminus

== Special routes ==
=== Franklin bypass route ===
State Route 34 Bypass
- Location: Franklin
- Existed: 1949–1983

State Route 34 Bypass (SR 34 Byp.) was a bypass of SR 34 that existed completely within the city limits of Franklin. In 1949, it was established from US 27/SR 1/SR 100 in the southeastern part of the city to SR 34 in the northeastern part. In 1983, it was decommissioned.

The entire route was in Franklin, Heard County.

mi	km	Destinations	Notes
		US 27 / SR 1 / SR 100	Southern terminus
		SR 34	Northern terminus
1.000 mi = 1.609 km; 1.000 km = 0.621 mi

=== Newnan bypass route ===
State Route 34 Bypass
- Location: Around Newnan
- Length: 6.0 mi (9.7 km)
- Existed: 1989–present

State Route 34 Bypass (SR 34 Byp.) is a 6.0-mile-long (9.7 km) bypass route of SR 34 that exists entirely within the central part of Coweta County. Approximately half of the highway is located in the city limits of Newnan. Most of the bypass functions as a truck route for US 27 Alt./US 29/SR 14/SR 16/SR 34

It begins at an intersection with the SR 34 mainline (Franklin Road) west of Newnan. It heads north, has an interchange with Welcome Road, and curves to the east-northeast and intersects US 27 Alt./SR 16 (Temple Avenue) northwest of the city. Then, it continues to an intersection with the southern terminus of SR 70 (Roscoe Road), on the northern edge of the city. SR 34 Byp. curves to the southeast and intersects US 29/SR 14 (Jackson Street). It curves its way through the city, until it meets its eastern terminus, a second intersection with the SR 34 mainline (Bullsboro Drive), in the eastern part of the city.

The entire length of SR 34 is included as part of the National Highway System, a system of routes determined to be the most important for the nation's economy, mobility, and defense.

In 1984, a northern bypass of Newnan was established from US 29/SR 14 just north of the city to SR 34 just northeast of it. However, it was unnumbered. The next year, a western extension of this bypass, designated as SR 747, was proposed to have a western terminus at SR 34 west of the city. In 1986, this bypass was then proposed as SR 34 Byp. The next year, it was re-proposed as SR 747. In 1988, it was completed as SR 747 from US 27 Alt./SR 16 to US 29/SR 14. The next year, this bypass was entirely redesignated as SR 34 Byp.

The entire route is in Coweta County.

Location	mi	km	Destinations	Notes
	0.0	0.0	SR 34 (Franklin Road) / Ishman–Ballard Road south – Franklin, Newnan, Chattahooche Bend State Park	Western terminus of SR 34 Byp.; northern terminus of Ishman–Ballard Road
			Welcome Road	Interchange via access road
	2.0	3.2	US 27 Alt. / SR 16 (Temple Avenue) – Newnan, Carrollton, Whitesburg, Luthersville	
Newnan	3.1	5.0	SR 70 north (Roscoe Road) – Newnan, Roscoe, Vinewood Plantation, Dunaway Gardens	Southern terminus of SR 70
Newnan	3.8	6.1	US 29 / SR 14 (Jackson Street) – Newnan, Palmetto	
Newnan	6.0	9.7	SR 34 (Bullsboro Drive) to I-85 (SR 403) / Newnan Crossing Bypass south – Newnan, Peachtree City, Piedmont Newnan Hospital, Male Academy Museum	Eastern terminus of SR 34 Byp.; northern terminus of Newnan Crossing Bypass
1.000 mi = 1.609 km; 1.000 km = 0.621 mi
