= Coweta County, Georgia =

County in Georgia, United States

- County
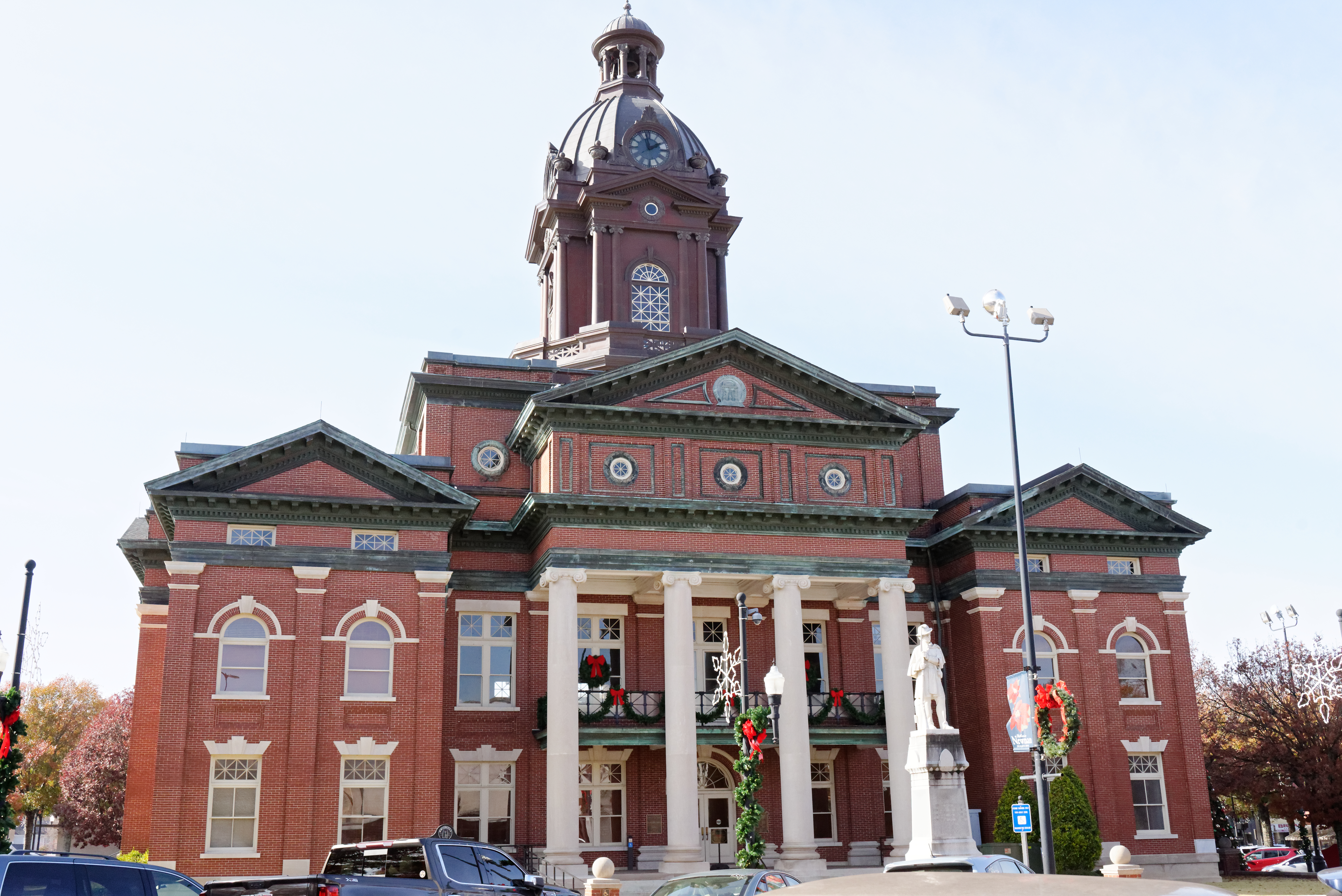
- Coweta County Courthouse in Newnan

- Flag Seal Logo

- Location within the U.S. state of Georgia
- Coordinates: 33°21′N 84°46′W
- Country: United States
- State: Georgia
- Founded: 1826; 200 years ago
- Seat: Newnan
- Largest city: Newnan

Area
  - Total: 446 sq mi (1,160 km^{2})
  - Land: 441 sq mi (1,140 km^{2})
  - Water: 4.9 sq mi (13 km^{2}) 1.1%

Population (2020)
  - Total: 146,158
  - Estimate (2025): 160,240 ▲
  - Density: 327/sq mi (126/km^{2})
- Time zone: UTC−5 (Eastern)
  - Summer (DST): UTC−4 (EDT)
- Congressional district: 3rd
- Website: coweta.ga.us

Coweta County /kaʊˈiːtə/ is a county in the West Central region of the U.S. state of Georgia. It is part of Metro Atlanta. As of the 2020 census, the population was 146,158. The county seat is Newnan.

Coweta County is included in the Atlanta-Sandy Springs-Roswell metropolitan statistical area.

== History ==
The land for Lee, Muscogee, Troup, Coweta and Carroll counties was ceded by the Creek people in the 1825 Treaty of Indian Springs. The counties' boundaries were created by the Georgia General Assembly on June 9, 1826, but they were not named until December 14, 1826. Coweta County was named for the Koweta Indians (a sub-group of the Creek people), who had several towns in and around the present-day county.

In 1882, Aleck Brown, an African-American man accused of raping a white woman, was lynched. In 1899, Sam Hose, an African-American man accused of killing his boss, was tortured and burned alive by a lynch mob of approximately 2,000 citizens of Coweta County.

== Geography ==
According to the U.S. Census Bureau, the county has a total area of 446 square miles (1,160 km^{2}), of which 441 square miles (1,140 km^{2}) is land and 4.9 square miles (13 km^{2}) (1.1%) is water. The county is located in the Piedmont region of the state.

The eastern half of Coweta County, from Palmetto southwest to Newnan, then south to Luthersville, is in the Upper Flint River sub-basin of the ACF River Basin (Apalachicola-Chattahoochee-Flint River Basin). The western half is in the Middle Chattahoochee River-Lake Harding sub-basin of the same ACF River Basin.

=== Major highways ===
- Interstate 85 / State Route 403
- U.S. Route 27 Alternate
- U.S. Route 29 / State Route 14
- State Route 16
- State Route 34
  - State Route 34 Bypass
- State Route 41
- State Route 54
- State Route 70
- State Route 74 / State Route 85
- State Route 154

=== Adjacent counties ===
- Fulton County – northeast
- Fayette County – east
- Spalding County – East/southeast
- Meriwether County – south
- Troup County – southwest
- Heard County – west
- Carroll County – northwest

== Communities ==
=== Cities ===
- Chattahoochee Hills (partly in Fulton County)
- Grantville
- Newnan
- Palmetto (partly in Fulton County)
- Senoia

=== Towns ===
- Haralson
- Moreland
- Sharpsburg
- Turin

=== Census-designated place ===
- East Newnan

=== Unincorporated communities ===
- Corinth (partly in Heard County)
- Raymond
- Roscoe
- Sargent
- Thomas Crossroads

=== Planned town ===
In the federal government's National Urban Policy and New Community Development Act of 1970, funding was provided for thirteen "new towns" or planned cities throughout the country. One 7,400-acre location was set to be developed in Coweta County and was known as Shenandoah. The project was launched in the early 1970s and was foreclosed on in 1981, when it included 170 families and 108 residential lots.

== Demographics ==
Historical population
Census	Pop.	Note	%±
1830	5,003		—
1840	10,364		107.2%
1850	13,635		31.6%
1860	14,703		7.8%
1870	15,875		8.0%
1880	21,109		33.0%
1890	22,354		5.9%
1900	24,980		11.7%
1910	28,800		15.3%
1920	29,047		0.9%
1930	25,127		−13.5%
1940	26,972		7.3%
1950	27,786		3.0%
1960	28,893		4.0%
1970	32,310		11.8%
1980	39,268		21.5%
1990	53,853		37.1%
2000	89,215		65.7%
2010	127,317		42.7%
2020	146,158		14.8%
2025 (est.)	160,240	▲	9.6%
U.S. Decennial Census; 1790-1880 1890-1910; 1920-1930 1930-1940; 1940-1950 1960-1980; 1980-2000 2010

=== Racial and ethnic composition ===
Coweta County, Georgia – Racial and ethnic composition Note: the US Census treats Hispanic/Latino as an ethnic category. This table excludes Latinos from the racial categories and assigns them to a separate category. Hispanics/Latinos may be of any race.
Race / Ethnicity (NH = Non-Hispanic)	Pop 1980	Pop 1990	Pop 2000	Pop 2010	Pop 2020	% 1980	% 1990	% 2000	% 2010	% 2020
White alone (NH)	28,324	41,044	68,867	92,604	99,421	72.13%	76.21%	77.19%	72.73%	68.02%
Black or African American alone (NH)	10,564	12,162	15,935	21,744	25,544	26.90%	22.58%	17.86%	17.08%	17.48%
Native American or Alaska Native alone (NH)	32	101	183	284	298	0.08%	0.19%	0.21%	0.22%	0.20%
Asian alone (NH)	35	149	608	1,895	3,329	0.09%	0.28%	0.68%	1.49%	2.28%
Native Hawaiian or Pacific Islander alone (NH)	x	x	13	54	62	x	x	0.01%	0.04%	0.04%
Other race alone (NH)	19	12	78	182	669	0.05%	0.02%	0.09%	0.14%	0.46%
Mixed race or Multiracial (NH)	x	x	734	2,061	5,782	x	x	0.82%	1.62%	3.96%
Hispanic or Latino (any race)	294	385	2,797	8,493	11,053	0.75%	0.71%	3.14%	6.67%	7.56%
Total	39,268	53,853	89,215	127,317	146,158	100.00%	100.00%	100.00%	100.00%	100.00%

=== 2020 census ===
As of the 2020 census, the county had a population of 146,158. The median age was 39.5 years. 23.9% of residents were under the age of 18 and 15.0% of residents were 65 years of age or older. For every 100 females there were 93.9 males, and for every 100 females age 18 and over there were 91.4 males age 18 and over. 55.1% of residents lived in urban areas, while 44.9% lived in rural areas.

The racial makeup of the county was 69.6% White, 17.7% Black or African American, 0.4% American Indian and Alaska Native, 2.3% Asian, 0.0% Native Hawaiian and Pacific Islander, 3.2% from some other race, and 6.8% from two or more races. Hispanic or Latino residents of any race comprised 7.6% of the population.

There were 53,596 households in the county, of which 35.3% had children under the age of 18 living with them and 24.4% had a female householder with no spouse or partner present. About 20.8% of all households were made up of individuals and 8.7% had someone living alone who was 65 years of age or older.

There were 56,729 housing units, of which 5.5% were vacant. Among occupied housing units, 73.4% were owner-occupied and 26.6% were renter-occupied. The homeowner vacancy rate was 1.6% and the rental vacancy rate was 7.2%.

== Education ==
The Coweta County School System holds pre-school to grade 12, and consists of nineteen elementary schools, six middle schools and three high schools. The system has 1,164 full-time teachers and more than 18,389 students. Private schools in the county include The Heritage School and Trinity Christian School.

Mercer University has a Regional Academic Center in Newnan. The center, opened in 2010, offers programs through the university's College of Continuing and Professional Studies. The University of West Georgia has a campus near downtown Newnan on the site of the old Newnan Hospital. This campus offers two undergraduate programs - Bachelor of Science in nursing and early childhood education.

Newnan is also home to a campus of West Georgia Technical College.

== Government ==
The legislative body of Coweta is the Coweta County Commission, which consists of five members elected from numbered districts. The chairmanship rotates among the members. Coweta County is the only county in Georgia that operates with a rotating chairmanship.

District	Commissioner	Party	Term of office	Seat up
District 1	Paul Poole	Republican	2021–present	2024
District 2	Bill McKenzie	Republican	2021–present	2026
District 3	Bob Blackburn	Republican	2023–present	2026
District 4	John Reidelbach (chairman)	Republican	2021–present	2024
District 5	Al Smith	Democratic	2021–present	2024

In the General Assembly, it is currently divided between State House district 70, 71, 72 and 132, and is within State Senate district 28 (currently held by Matt Brass). In Congress, it is in the 3rd congressional district, currently represented by Brian Jack.

=== Politics ===
Coweta County is a strongly Republican county, voting 68.4 percent for Donald Trump in 2016 and 69.9 percent for Brian Kemp in 2018.

For elections to the United States House of Representatives, Coweta County is part of Georgia's 3rd congressional district.

For elections to the Georgia State Senate, Coweta County is a part of District 6. For elections to the Georgia House of Representatives, Coweta County is represented by districts 65, 67, 70 and 73.

United States presidential election results for Coweta County, Georgia
Year	Republican		Democratic		Third party(ies)	
Year	No.	%	No.	%	No.	%
1880	1,285	48.20%	1,381	51.80%	0	0.00%
1884	1,326	47.10%	1,489	52.90%	0	0.00%
1888	990	40.05%	1,476	59.71%	6	0.24%
1892	1,085	34.50%	2,005	63.75%	55	1.75%
1896	571	31.86%	1,196	66.74%	25	1.40%
1900	232	17.82%	1,063	81.64%	7	0.54%
1904	160	12.46%	1,070	83.33%	54	4.21%
1908	220	17.30%	1,032	81.13%	20	1.57%
1912	46	4.09%	1,044	92.80%	35	3.11%
1916	26	2.02%	1,179	91.40%	85	6.59%
1920	169	13.38%	1,094	86.62%	0	0.00%
1924	67	6.00%	1,010	90.42%	40	3.58%
1928	229	12.15%	1,656	87.85%	0	0.00%
1932	46	2.06%	2,183	97.67%	6	0.27%
1936	73	3.13%	2,260	96.75%	3	0.13%
1940	103	3.48%	2,846	96.25%	8	0.27%
1944	130	4.68%	2,649	95.32%	0	0.00%
1948	219	8.27%	2,214	83.58%	216	8.15%
1952	652	14.52%	3,837	85.48%	0	0.00%
1956	850	22.06%	3,003	77.94%	0	0.00%
1960	1,159	23.12%	3,855	76.88%	0	0.00%
1964	3,656	49.62%	3,712	50.38%	0	0.00%
1968	2,442	32.84%	1,204	16.19%	3,791	50.97%
1972	5,751	78.66%	1,560	21.34%	0	0.00%
1976	3,044	32.95%	6,195	67.05%	0	0.00%
1980	4,480	42.99%	5,697	54.66%	245	2.35%
1984	7,981	68.62%	3,650	31.38%	0	0.00%
1988	9,668	69.41%	4,212	30.24%	49	0.35%
1992	9,814	47.75%	7,093	34.51%	3,646	17.74%
1996	13,058	56.85%	7,794	33.93%	2,118	9.22%
2000	21,327	68.30%	9,056	29.00%	843	2.70%
2004	31,682	74.36%	10,647	24.99%	280	0.66%
2008	37,571	70.05%	15,521	28.94%	543	1.01%
2012	39,653	71.17%	15,168	27.22%	897	1.61%
2016	42,533	68.37%	16,583	26.66%	3,094	4.97%
2020	51,501	67.02%	24,210	31.50%	1,134	1.48%
2024	57,204	66.58%	28,111	32.72%	601	0.70%

United States Senate election results for Coweta County, Georgia2
Year	Republican		Democratic		Third party(ies)	
Year	No.	%	No.	%	No.	%
2020	51,299	67.39%	22,915	30.10%	1,908	2.51%
2020	45,776	68.01%	21,527	31.99%	0	0.00%

United States Senate election results for Coweta County, Georgia3
Year	Republican		Democratic		Third party(ies)	
Year	No.	%	No.	%	No.	%
2020	28,927	38.24%	16,593	21.94%	30,122	39.82%
2020	45,462	67.56%	21,825	32.44%	0	0.00%
2022	41,512	65.52%	20,169	31.83%	1,674	2.64%
2022	35,110	66.74%	17,500	33.26%	0	0.00%

Georgia Gubernatorial election results for Coweta County
Year	Republican		Democratic		Third party(ies)	
Year	No.	%	No.	%	No.	%
2022	45,376	71.20%	17,847	28.01%	503	0.79%

== Notable people ==
- Ellis Gibbs Arnall, governor of Georgia, 1943–1947
- William Yates Atkinson, governor of Georgia, 1894–1896; founded Georgia State College for Women, now Georgia College & State University
- Steve Bedrosian, former Major League baseball player; National League Cy Young Award winner in 1987
- Eric Berry, football player for the Kansas City Chiefs
- Keith Brooking, football player for the Atlanta Falcons and Dallas Cowboys
- Erskine Caldwell, author of the novels Tobacco Road and God's Little Acre
- Lewis Grizzard, newspaper columnist, author and humorist
- Drew Hill, played for the pro football Houston Oilers, Los Angeles Rams and Atlanta Falcons
- Sam Hose, African-American man who was brutally murdered by a lynch mob after accusations of murder, assault and rape
- Alan Jackson, country music singer and musician
- Joe M. Jackson, colonel, U.S. Air Force, Medal of Honor recipient
- Warren Newson, played pro baseball for the Chicago White Sox
- Stephen W. Pless, major, U.S. Marine Corps, Medal of Honor recipient
- Jefferson Randolph "Soapy" Smith, confidence man and crime boss
- Charles Wadsworth, retired director of the Chamber Music Society at the Lincoln Center for the Performing Arts
- Jerome Walton, former Major League baseball player; Rookie of the Year in the National League in 1989
- Rutledge Wood, auto racing analyst and host of Top Gear
- Will Smith, professional baseball player for the Kansas City Royals

== See also ==
- National Register of Historic Places listings in Coweta County, Georgia
- B. T. Brown Reservoir
- Murder in Coweta County
- Murder in Coweta County 1983 film
- List of counties in Georgia
