= Georgia State Route 70 =

State highway in Georgia, United States

State Route 70
- SR 70 highlighted in red

Route information
- Maintained by GDOT
- Length: 43.1 mi (69.4 km)

Major junctions
- South end: US 29 / SR 14 in Newnan
- US 29 Alt. / SR 14 Alt. / SR 154 near Fairburn; SR 92 from Campbellton to near Doublegate; SR 166 near Campbellton; SR 154 / SR 166 northeast of Campbellton; SR 6 northeast of Campbellton; I-20 west of Atlanta
- North end: US 78 / US 278 / SR 8 in west-central Atlanta

Location
- Country: United States
- State: Georgia
- Counties: Coweta, Fulton, Douglas

Highway system
- Georgia State Highway System; Interstate; US; State; Special
← SR 69	→ SR 71

State Route 70 (SR 70) is a 43.1-mile-long (69.4 km) state highway that travels southwest-to-northeast through portions of Coweta and Fulton counties in the north-central part of the U.S. state of Georgia. The highway connects Newnan with the west-central part of Atlanta.

== Route description ==
=== Coweta County ===
SR 70 begins at an intersection with US 29/SR 14 in the northwestern part of Newnan in the central part of Coweta County. At this intersection, the roadway continues as Sprayberry Road. SR 70 travels to the west and immediately curves to the northwest. It leaves Newnan and intersects SR 34 Byp. (Millard Farmer Industrial Boulevard). It curves to the north-northwest and then to a due-north direction. The highway crosses over Wahoo Creek and curves back to the north-northwest. It crosses over Little Wahoo Creek and then curves to the north-northeast. It curves back to the north-northwest and crosses over Cedar Creek. The highway then curves back to the north-northeast before entering the unincorporated community of Roscoe. There, it curves to the east-southeast and then back to the north-northeast. Then, it enters the southwestern part of Fulton County.

=== Southwestern Fulton County ===
SR 70 crosses over White Oak Creek before intersecting South Fulton Parkway. Here, SR 70 turns right and travels to the southeast. It crosses over White Oak Creek again before it makes a gradual curve to the east-northeast. Then, it crosses over Moss Creek. After curving to the east-southeast, it crosses over Cedar Branch. Then, it begins a gradual curve back to the east-northeast. It intersects Cochran Mill Road, which leads to Cochran Mill Nature Center and Cochran Mill Park. The highway crosses over Little Bear Creek and Bear Creek before curving to the northeast. Just after curving back to the east-northeast, it intersects US 29 Alt./SR 14 Alt./SR 154 (Cascade-Palmetto Highway). Here, US 29 Alt./SR 14 Alt. take the route of South Fulton Parkway, and SR 70 turns left onto SR 154. The two highways travel to the north-northeast. They curve to the north-northwest and begin paralleling Pea Creek. After crossing over that creek, they travel just to the west of Horsehead Lake. They then have a roundabout with the eastern terminus of the western segment of Cedar Grove Road and the western terminus of Ridge Road. SR 70 and SR 154 curve back to the north-northeast and begin paralleling Tuggle Creek. After crossing over Town Creek, they curve to the northeast and enter Campbellton. There, they intersect SR 92 (Campbellton-Fairburn Road). SR 70 and SR 154 turn left and follow SR 92 to the northwest. An intersection with Church Street leads to Campbellton Park. They curve to the north-northwest and leave Campbellton before crossing over the Chattahoochee River on the Robert and Ardena Beasley Memorial Bridge. This crossing marks the Douglas County line.

=== Douglas County ===
Almost immediately, SR 166 joins the concurrency. The four highways curve to the northeast. They pass Boundary Waters Park. They curve to the north-northwest and pass New Manchester High School. They curve back to the north-northeast and cross over Gilberts Branch. At an intersection with Fairburn Road and the southern terminus of Old Lower River Road, SR 92 turns left onto Fairburn Road west, and SR 70, SR 92, and SR 154 turns right onto Fairburn Road east. The three highways travel to the southeast. They curve to the east-southeast and then cross over the Chattahoochee River again, this time on the Dick Lane Bridge, and re-enter Fulton County, this time in the west-central part of it.

=== West-central Fulton County ===
At an intersection with Fulton Industrial Boulevard, SR 70 turns left and travels to the northeast, while SR 154 and SR 166 continue to the east-southeast on Campbellton Road. The highway then curves to the north-northeast. It curves back to the northeast and intersects SR 6. It crosses over Utoy Creek before an interchange with Interstate 20 (I-20; Tom Murphy Freeway). Then, it has an intersection with SR 139. The highway crosses over Sandy Creek and curves to the east-northeast. It then enters Atlanta before meeting its northern terminus, an intersection with US 78/US 278/SR 8 (Donald Lee Hollowell Parkway NW). Here, the roadway continues as Fulton Industrial Boulevard NW.

== History ==
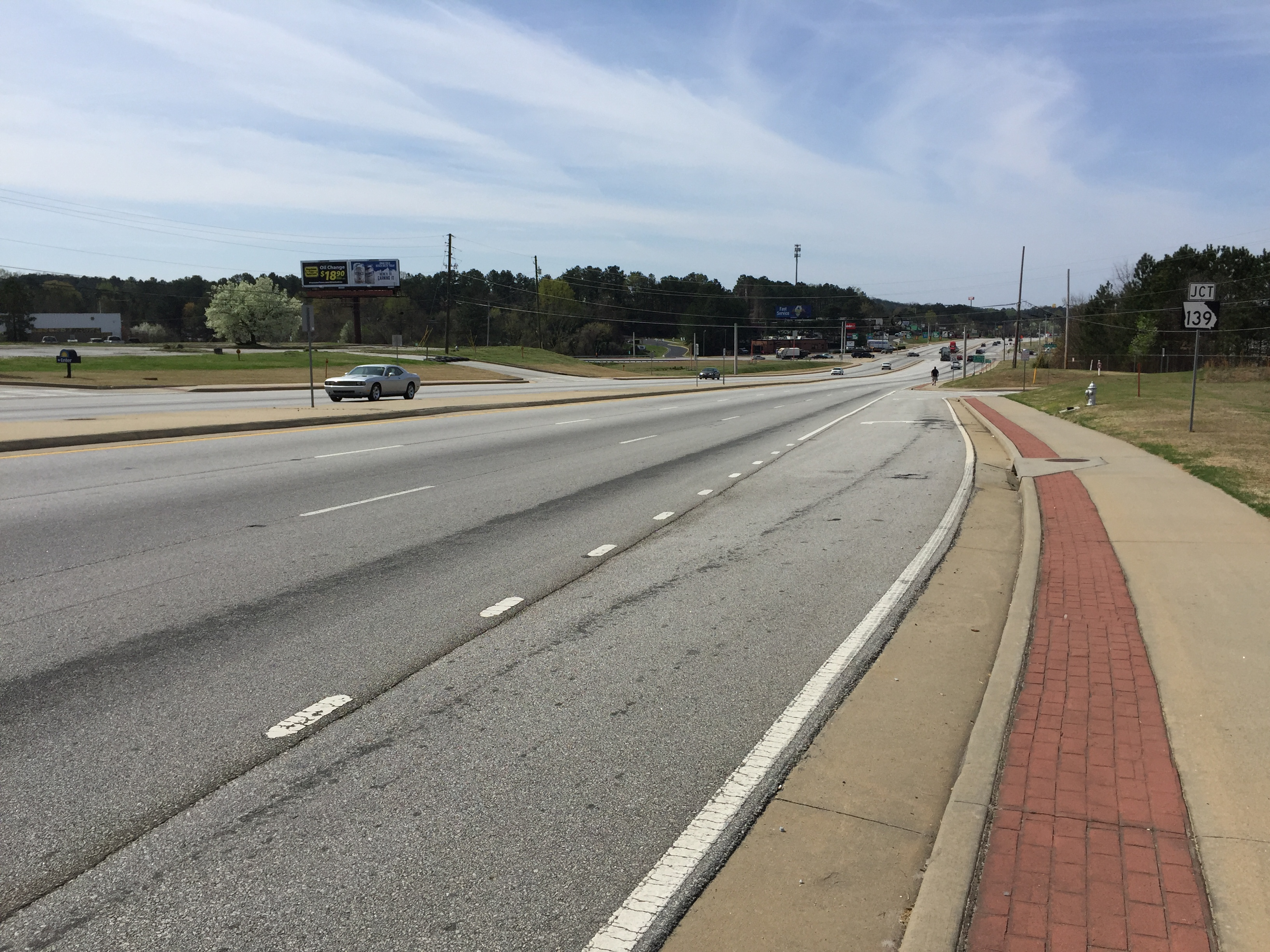
Fulton Industrial Boulevard

SR 70 used to travel along Fulton Industrial Boulevard between Campbellton Road and Fairburn Road in southwestern Fulton County, However, it was re-routed over the Chattahoochee River into Douglas County, before crossing over the river again back into Fulton County. However, this stretch no longer carries a state route number.

== Major intersections ==
County	Location	mi	km	Destinations	Notes
Coweta	Newnan	0.0	0.0	US 29 / SR 14 (Jackson Street) / Sprayberry Road east	Southern terminus of SR 70; western terminus of Sprayberry Road
Coweta		0.6	0.97	SR 34 Byp. (Millard Farmer Industrial Boulevard) – Franklin, Peachtree City	
Fulton		20.6	33.2	US 29 Alt. / SR 14 Alt. (Cascade–Palmetto Highway south / South Fulton Parkway east) / SR 154 west (Cascade–Palmetto Highway south)	Southern end of SR 154 concurrency
Fulton	Campbellton	25.6	41.2	SR 92 south (Campbellton–Fairburn Road) / Cascade–Palmetto Highway north	Southern end of SR 92 concurrency
Chattahoochee River		26.0 26.2	41.8 42.2	Robert and Ardena Beasley Memorial Bridge	
Douglas		26.3– 26.4	42.3– 42.5	SR 166 west	Southern end of SR 166 concurrency
Douglas		29.9	48.1	SR 92 north (Fairburn Road) / Old Lower River Road north	Northern end of SR 92 concurrency; southern terminus of Old Lower River Road
Chattahoochee River		32.2 32.2	51.8 51.8	Dick Lane Bridge	
Fulton		33.2	53.4	SR 154 east / SR 166 east (Campbellton Road) / Cascade–Palmetto Highway south	Northern end of SR 154 and SR 166 concurrencies
Fulton		36.7	59.1	SR 6 (Camp Creek Parkway) – East Point	
Fulton		40.5– 40.7	65.2– 65.5	I-20 (Tom Murphy Freeway / SR 402) – Birmingham, Atlanta	I-20 exit 49
Fulton		41.1	66.1	SR 139 (Martin L. King Jr. Drive) to I-285 – Mableton, Atlanta	
Fulton	Atlanta	43.1	69.4	US 78 / US 278 / SR 8 (Donald Lee Hollowell Parkway) / Fulton Industrial Boulevard NW north to I-285 – Austell, Decatur	Northern terminus; roadway continues as Fulton Industrial Boulevard NW.
1.000 mi = 1.609 km; 1.000 km = 0.621 mi: Concurrency terminus
