= Palmetto, Georgia =

- City
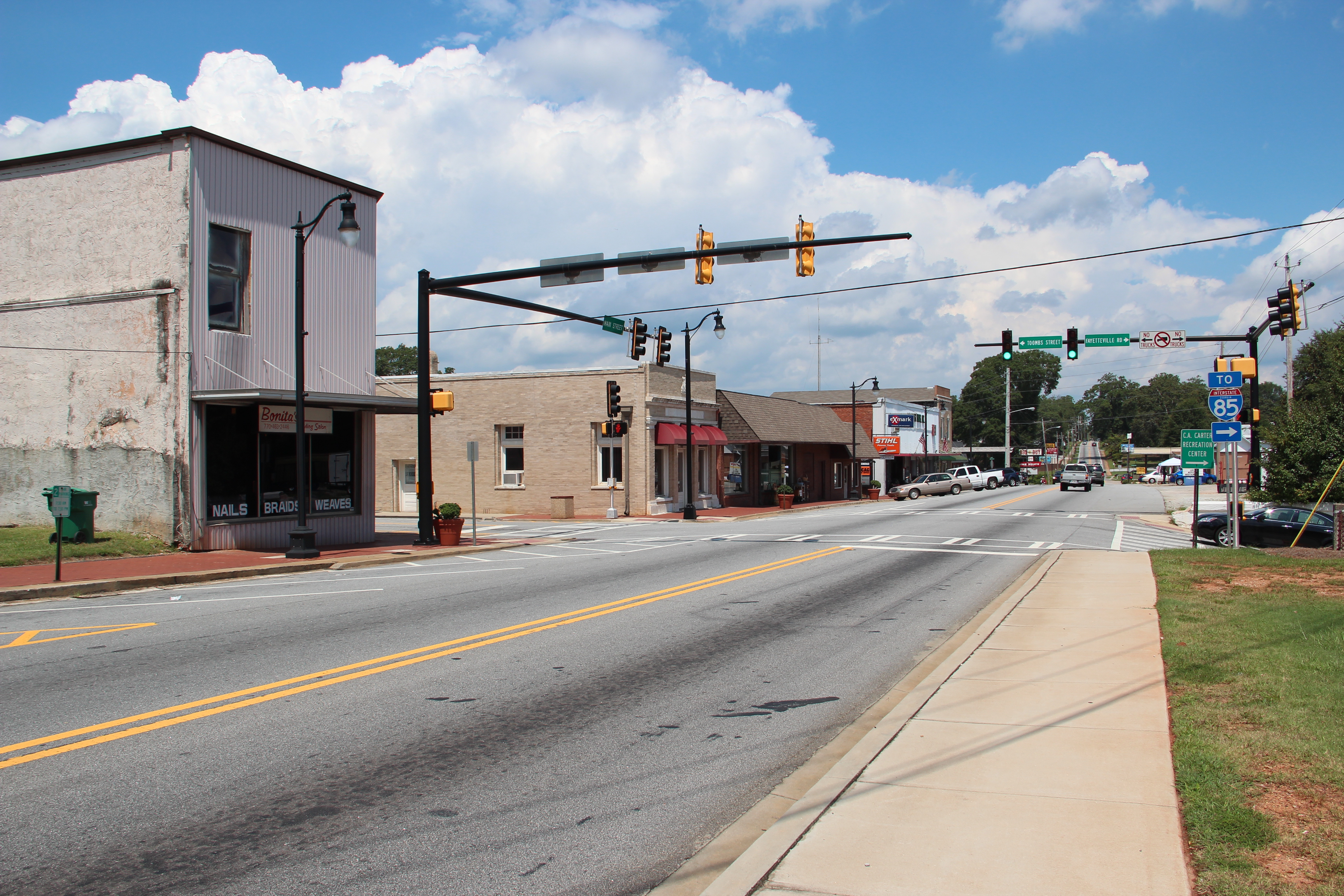
- Downtown Palmetto

- Seal

- Location in Fulton County and the state of Georgia
- Coordinates: 33°31′52″N 84°40′03″W
- Country: United States
- State: Georgia
- Counties: Fulton, Coweta

Government
  - Mayor: Teresa Thomas-Smith

Area
  - Total: 12.04 sq mi (31.19 km^{2})
  - Land: 11.86 sq mi (30.71 km^{2})
  - Water: 0.19 sq mi (0.49 km^{2})
- Elevation: 1,020 ft (310 m)

Population (2020)
  - Total: 5,071
  - Density: 427.7/sq mi (165.14/km^{2})
- Time zone: UTC-5 (Eastern (EST))
  - Summer (DST): UTC-4 (EDT)
- ZIP code: 30268
- Area code: 770
- FIPS code: 13-58884
- GNIS feature ID: 2404466
- Website: citypalmetto.com

Palmetto is a city located mostly in Fulton County (originally Campbell County) and now partly in Coweta County in the U.S. state of Georgia. The population was 5,071 at the 2020 census.

== History ==
The Georgia General Assembly incorporated Palmetto as a town in 1854. The community was named after the Palmetto Regiment of the Mexican–American War. In 2023, Palmetto elected its first female and African American mayor when Teresa Thomas-Smith won the election by 84 votes.

== Demographics ==
Historical population
Census	Pop.	Note	%±
1860	1,526		—
1870	294		−80.7%
1880	473		60.9%
1890	552		16.7%
1900	620		12.3%
1910	922		48.7%
1920	965		4.7%
1930	964		−0.1%
1940	1,029		6.7%
1950	1,257		22.2%
1960	1,466		16.6%
1970	2,045		39.5%
1980	2,086		2.0%
1990	2,612		25.2%
2000	3,400		30.2%
2010	4,488		32.0%
2020	5,071		13.0%
2025 (est.)	5,298	▲	4.5%
U.S. Decennial Census; 1850-1870 1870-1880; 1890-1910 1920-1930; 1940 1950 1960; 1970 1980 1990; 2000 2010

=== Racial and ethnic composition ===
Palmetto city, Georgia – Racial and ethnic composition Note: the US Census treats Hispanic/Latino as an ethnic category. This table excludes Latinos from the racial categories and assigns them to a separate category. Hispanics/Latinos may be of any race.
Race / Ethnicity (NH = Non-Hispanic)	Pop 2000	Pop 2010	Pop 2020	% 2000	% 2010	% 2020
White alone (NH)	1,443	1,209	1,203	42.44%	26.94%	23.72%
Black or African American alone (NH)	1,490	2,552	2,949	43.82%	56.86%	58.15%
Native American or Alaska Native alone (NH)	13	5	9	0.38%	0.11%	0.18%
Asian alone (NH)	1	33	43	0.03%	0.74%	0.85%
Native Hawaiian or Pacific Islander alone (NH)	1	1	1	0.03%	0.02%	0.02%
Other race alone (NH)	8	5	25	0.24%	0.11%	0.49%
Mixed race or Multiracial (NH)	49	113	180	1.44%	2.52%	3.55%
Hispanic or Latino (any race)	395	570	661	11.62%	12.70%	13.03%
Total	3,400	4,488	5,071	100.00%	100.00%	100.00%

=== 2020 census ===
As of the 2020 census, Palmetto had a population of 5,071. The median age was 36.5 years. 25.0% of residents were under the age of 18 and 14.1% of residents were 65 years of age or older. For every 100 females there were 84.0 males, and for every 100 females age 18 and over there were 79.6 males age 18 and over.

88.0% of residents lived in urban areas, while 12.0% lived in rural areas.

There were 1,866 households in Palmetto, of which 38.4% had children under the age of 18 living in them. Of all households, 35.0% were married-couple households, 17.8% were households with a male householder and no spouse or partner present, and 40.9% were households with a female householder and no spouse or partner present. About 27.6% of all households were made up of individuals and 12.2% had someone living alone who was 65 years of age or older. There were 1,200 families.

There were 2,055 housing units, of which 9.2% were vacant. The homeowner vacancy rate was 2.9% and the rental vacancy rate was 11.3%.
