= National Register of Historic Places listings in Troup County, Georgia =

This is a list of properties and districts in Troup County, Georgia that are listed on the National Register of Historic Places (NRHP).

This National Park Service list is complete through NPS recent listings posted March 21, 2025.

== Current listings ==
| | Name on the Register | Image | Date listed | Location | City or town | Description |
|---|---|---|---|---|---|---|
| 1 | Bellevue | Bellevue | November 7, 1972 (#72000400) | 204 Ben Hill St. 33°02′30″N 85°02′22″W | LaGrange | The historic home of Senator Benjamin Harvey Hill. Built from 1853 to 1855 in the Greek Revival style. It was named a National Historic Landmark in 1973. |
| 2 | Broad Street Historic District | Broad Street Historic District | January 12, 1984 (#84001264) | Roughly bounded by McLendon Circle, Gordon St., Vernon Rd., and Wavely Way; 33°02′23″N 85°02′26″W | LaGrange | |
| 3 | College Home/Smith Hall | College Home/Smith Hall | August 26, 1982 (#82002488) | LaGrange College campus 33°02′22″N 85°02′33″W | LaGrange | Located on the campus of LaGrange College, Smith Hall is the oldest building on the campus. The main portion of the building was built in 1842. The building now houses offices, classrooms and seminar rooms. Smith Hall was named in memory of Mrs. Oreon Smith, wife of former College president Rufus W. Smith, who served from 1885 until his death in 1915. |
| 4 | Dixie Cotton Mills and Mill Village Historic District | | July 28, 2022 (#100007942) | Roughly centered on 710 Greenville St. 33°02′30″N 85°00′58″W | LaGrange | |
| 5 | East Main Street-Johnson Street Historic District | East Main Street-Johnson Street Historic District | July 14, 2000 (#00000788) | Centered on East Main and Johnson Sts. 33°10′19″N 84°54′29″W | Hogansville | |
| 6 | Eastside Historic District | Eastside Historic District | August 28, 2012 (#12000552) | Roughly bounded by Ave. A, Ave. P, E. 12th, & E. 3rd Sts. 32°52′23″N 85°10′19″W | West Point | |
| 7 | Fannin-Trutti-Handley Place | Fannin-Trutti-Handley Place | December 17, 1998 (#98001541) | 2159 Whitesville Rd., GA 219; 32°59′28″N 85°01′51″W | LaGrange | Most of the property was demolished in 2013 in preparation for commercial construction. Only the cemetery in the back of the property, and an old tenant house across the road remain. |
| 8 | Ferrell-Holder House | Ferrell-Holder House | August 14, 1979 (#79000748) | 1402 Vernon Rd. 33°02′09″N 85°03′13″W | LaGrange | |
| 9 | Hawkes Children's Library of West Point | Hawkes Children's Library of West Point | December 28, 1990 (#90001990) | 100 W. 8th St. 32°52′35″N 85°10′54″W | West Point | Built in 1922. |
| 10 | Heard-Dallis House | Heard-Dallis House | March 4, 1975 (#75000611) | 206 Broad St. 33°02′23″N 85°02′05″W | LaGrange | |
| 11 | H. Frank Jarrell House | H. Frank Jarrell House | October 22, 1992 (#92001399) | 605 Hill St. 33°02′44″N 85°01′08″W | LaGrange | Also known as "Hill Street House" |
| 12 | R. M. Jones General Store | R. M. Jones General Store | February 10, 2009 (#08001321) | 6926 Whitesville Rd. 32°52′26″N 85°02′03″W | Jones Crossroads | Built by Monroe Jones in 1903, the old rock store has been owned and operated by members of the Avery family since the 1920s. |
| 13 | Kidd-Robertson House | Kidd-Robertson House | December 30, 2008 (#08001249) | 2423 Greenville Rd. 33°02′34″N 84°56′49″W | LaGrange | |
| 14 | LaGrange Commercial Historic District | LaGrange Commercial Historic District | September 13, 2001 (#01000971) | Courthouse square, -Main St.-Ridley Ave., Bull St.-Church St., Broad and Greenville Sts., Vernon Rd.-LaFayette Pkwy, Haralson St. 33°02′16″N 85°01′46″W | LaGrange | part of the Georgia County Courthouses Thematic Resource (TR) |
| 15 | Liberty Hill | Liberty Hill | February 24, 1975 (#75000612) | Northwest of La Grange on Liberty Hill Rd. near West Point Lake. 33°06′35″N 85°07′43″W | Houston | The unincorporated community of Houston is also known as "Liberty Hill". |
| 16 | Long Cane Historic District | Long Cane Historic District | May 24, 1976 (#76000653) | North of West Point on U.S. 29; 32°57′36″N 85°08′04″W | West Point | |
| 17 | Mays-Boddie House | | June 28, 1982 (#82002489) | GA 109; 33°02′31″N 84°55′28″W | Mountville | House from around 1830, expanded around 1858, and barn across GA 109. |
| 18 | McFarland-Render House | McFarland-Render House | November 29, 1978 (#78001008) | 101 Bill Hart Rd. 33°21′03″N 84°42′17″W | Newnan | Also known as "The Magnolias Plantation". The McFarland-Render House was moved in 1997 from its former location at 612 Hones St. in La Grange to its current location at 101 Bill Hart Rd. in Newnan, Georgia. |
| 19 | Henry and Lura Miller House | Henry and Lura Miller House | December 21, 2020 (#100005926) | 1603 US 29; 32°53′10″N 85°10′11″W | West Point | The Henry and Lura Miller House was built in 1876 and is one of the best examples of neo-Georgian architecture in the state. |
| 20 | Nutwood | Nutwood | May 8, 1974 (#74000704) | North of Big Springs Rd. near Newsom Cemetery; 33°01′21″N 84°59′41″W | LaGrange | Nutwood was designed by architect Collin Rogers and built in 1833 by Joel Dortch Newsom. The house stands on what was then the Newsom family plantation, east of LaGrange. |
| 21 | Phillips-Sims House | Phillips-Sims House | April 17, 1986 (#86000791) | GA 54; 33°09′34″N 84°51′50″W | Hogansville | |
| 22 | Potts Brothers Store | Potts Brothers Store | March 31, 1983 (#83000246) | Gabbettville Rd; 32°56′40″N 85°07′58″W | West Point | |
| 23 | Reid-Glanton House | Reid-Glanton House | June 20, 1972 (#72000401) | East of La Grange at junction of GA 109 and Pattillo Rd. 33°02′45″N 84°58′22″W | LaGrange | |
| 24 | Riverside Club-Magnolia Club | Riverside Club-Magnolia Club | September 14, 2015 (#15000589) | 802 1st Ave. 32°52′38″N 85°10′54″W | West Point | |
| 25 | Royal Theater | Royal Theater | June 21, 2001 (#01000646) | 301 E. Main St. 33°10′23″N 84°54′44″W | Hogansville | Built in the art deco style in 1937, The Royal Theater currently serves as the Hogansville City Hall. |
| 26 | Rutledge House | Rutledge House | August 24, 1977 (#77000445) | South of LaGrange on Bartley Rd. 32°55′48″N 85°04′21″W | LaGrange | |
| 27 | Stark Mill and Mill Village Historic District | Stark Mill and Mill Village Historic District | July 5, 2000 (#00000754) | Roughly bounded by Lincoln, Askew, Church, Keith, and Brazil Sts, Whaley Ave. and the Hogansville city limits 33°10′46″N 84°54′28″W | Hogansville | |
| 28 | Strickland House | Strickland House | December 12, 1976 (#76000652) | Northwest of La Grange on Glenn Rd. just south of the Troup/Heard County line. 33°09′18″N 85°08′35″W | Houston | |
| 29 | Troup County Courthouse, Annex, and Jail | Troup County Courthouse, Annex, and Jail | June 8, 1995 (#95000721) | E. Haralson St. 33°02′25″N 85°01′50″W | LaGrange | Built in 1939, the old Troup County Courthouse is still in use today as the Juvenile Courthouse. The jail behind it was torn down in 2001 when the Troup County Government Center was built. Part of the Georgia County Courthouses TR. |
| 30 | Nathan Van Boddie House | Nathan Van Boddie House | August 29, 1977 (#77000446) | W. of Mountville on GA 109; 33°02′47″N 84°54′54″W | Mountville | Built in 1836, the house was designed by neoclassical architect Collin Rogers. The house is dominated by a two-story temple-front Ionic portico with a modillion cornice. |
| 31 | Vernon Road Historic District | Vernon Road Historic District | January 12, 1984 (#84001266) | Vernon Rd. from Jenkins St. to Forrest Ave. incl. Ferrel Dr., Broad and Carter Sts. 33°02′11″N 85°03′08″W | LaGrange | |
| 32 | West Point Commercial Historic District | West Point Commercial Historic District | February 1, 2006 (#05001596) | Roughly bounded by 4th Ave., 2nd Ave., W. 9th St., and W. 7th St. 32°52′38″N 85°11′04″W | West Point | |
| 33 | West Point Freight Depot | West Point Freight Depot | February 24, 2005 (#05000075) | 305 W. 5th St. 32°52′27″N 85°11′04″W | West Point | |
| 34 | West Point Public School | West Point Public School | April 1, 1999 (#99000411) | Junction of Ave. F and East 8th St. 32°52′28″N 85°10′28″W | West Point | |
| 35 | Westside Historic District | Westside Historic District | May 11, 2011 (#11000264) | Roughly bounded by W. 10th St., the GA—AL state line, W. 15th St. & the Chattahoochee River; 32°52′58″N 85°11′02″W | West Point | |
