= Mountville =

Mountville is the name of two towns in the United States:

- Mountville, Georgia
- Mountville, Pennsylvania
- Mountville, South Carolina
- Mountville, Virginia

== See also ==
- Montville (disambiguation)
