= R. M. Jones General Store =

- U.S. National Register of Historic Places
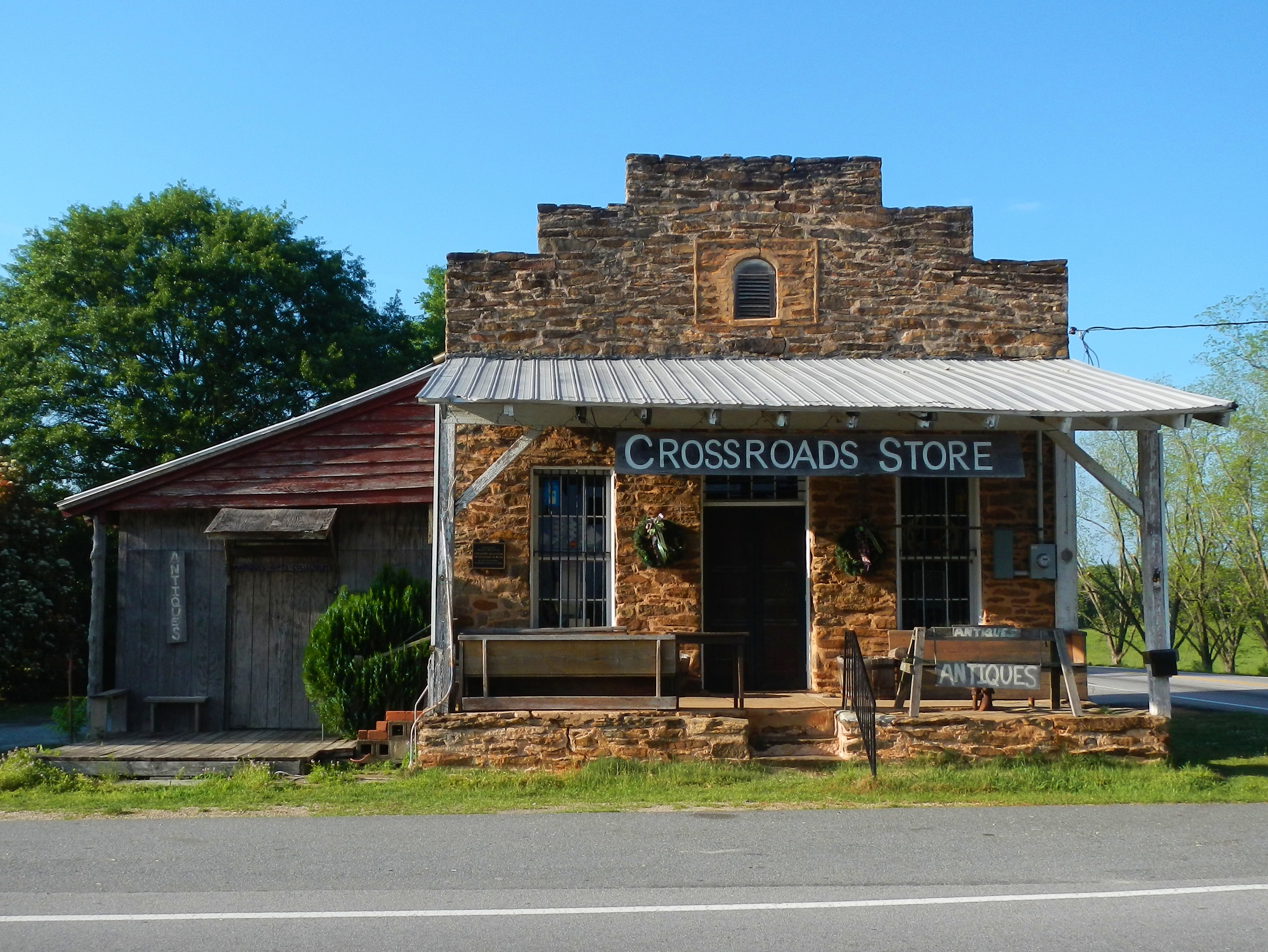
- Crossroads Store

- Location within Georgia Location within the United States
- Nearest city: LaGrange, Georgia
- Coordinates: 32°52′11″N 85°2′7″W
- Area: Less than one acre (0.40 ha)
- Built: 1903
- Architectural style: Fieldstone store
- NRHP reference No.: 08001321
- Added to NRHP: February 10, 2009

The R. M. Jones General Store, also known as the Crossroads Store, is a historic general store in Jones Crossroads, Troup County, Georgia. The rock building was constructed by Monroe Jones in 1903. It has been owned and operated by members of the Avery family since the 1920s. It was added to the National Register of Historic Places on February 10, 2009. It is located at 6926 Whitesville Road. The store's history is noted on a historical marker for Jones Crossroads.

== See also ==
- National Register of Historic Places listings in Troup County, Georgia
