= Long cane =

Long Cane may refer to:

- Long Cane, Georgia
- Long Cane Massacre Site, in South Carolina
