= Mays-Boddie House =

Historic house in the U.S.

- U.S. National Register of Historic Places
- Location within Georgia
- Nearest city: Mountville, Georgia
- Coordinates: 33.04208°N 84.92441°W
- Area: 198 acres (0.80 km^{2})
- Built: c.1830, 1858
- Architectural style: Double pen house
- NRHP reference No.: 82002489
- Added to NRHP: June 28, 1982

The Mays-Boddie House, in Troup County, Georgia, near Mountville, Georgia, was built around 1830. It was listed on the National Register of Historic Places in 1982.

It is a 1 1/2-story house, which, in 1982, was unpainted and plain.

It was built originally as a small double pen house, with two rooms over four rooms, and with a stairway in the rear of the house to the bedrooms above. Its walls are wide pine boards, with graining of a wainscot. It has heart pine mantels. After the Boddie family purchased the house in 1858, additions were made.

Besides for the house, the property was deemed significant "in landscape architecture as it displays features of carefully planned planting and buxus designs. It is significant in historic archaeology because there is evidence of outbuildings that are no longer extant as well as remains of a formal garden."

Outbuildings that been lost, whose locations were known at time of listing, included a carriage house, a chicken coop, and a smokehouse. Locations of slave quarters, later tenant houses, privies, and other barns, are not known.

Surviving contributing resources are a well, just west of the house, and a barn, just across the GA 109. The barn, though deteriorated, survived in 2016 and is located at exactly 33.042680°N 84.924879°W.

It is located on Georgia State Route 109 in a wooded area about 2.6 miles (4.2 km) west of Mountville.
