= Liberty Hill (La Grange, Georgia) =

Historic house in Georgia, United States

- U.S. National Register of Historic Places
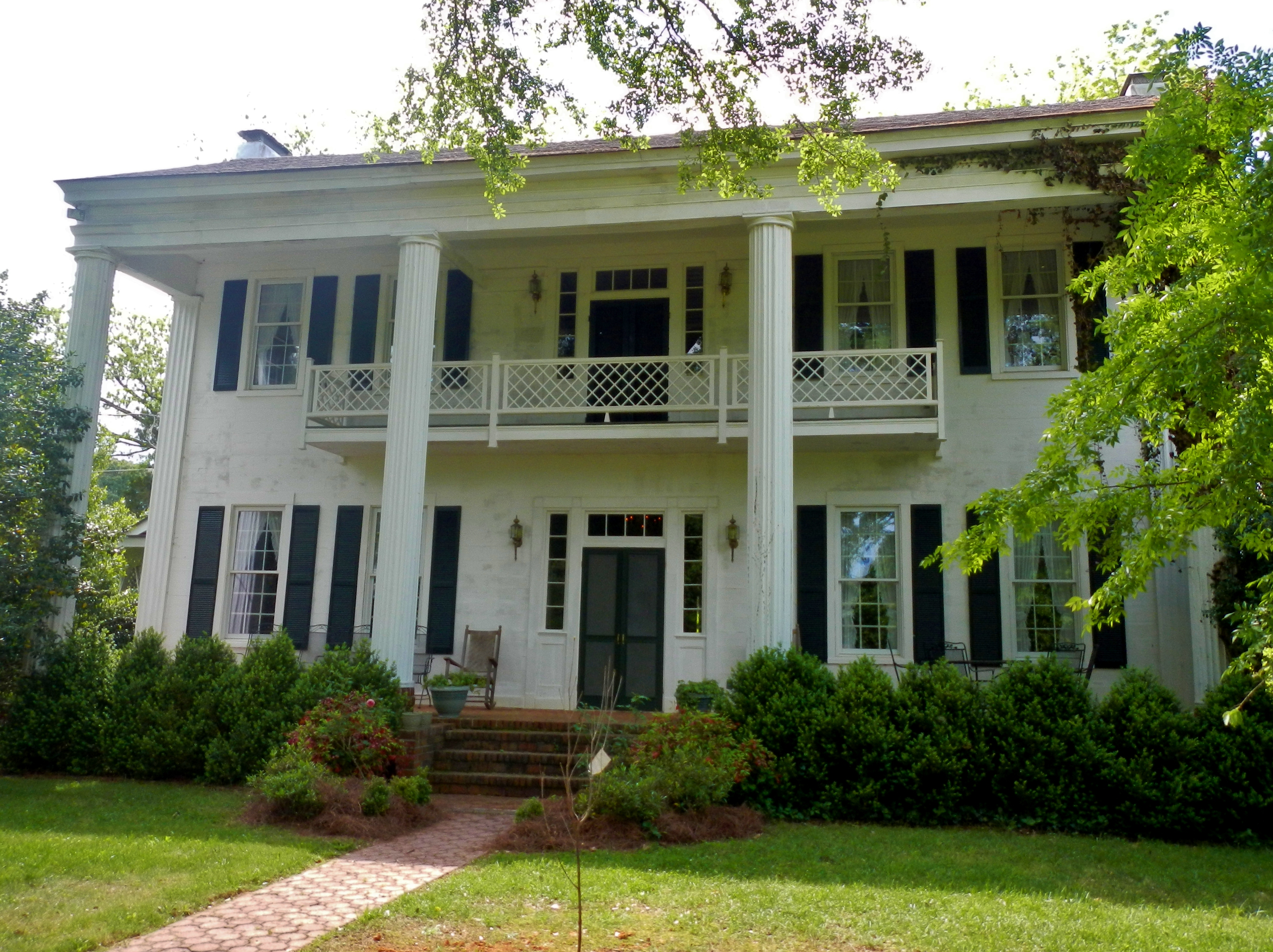
- The building is located in the unincorporated community of Houston, Georgia which is also known as "Liberty Hill".

- Location within Georgia Location within the United States
- Nearest city: Northwest of La Grange, Georgia
- Coordinates: 33°6′35″N 85°7′43″W
- Built: 1836
- Architectural style: Greek Revival
- NRHP reference No.: 75000612
- Added to NRHP: February 24, 1975

Liberty Hill in La Grange, Georgia, about 0.75 miles (1.21 km) west of the Chattahoochee River in Troup County, is a Greek Revival style plantation house built in the 1830s or 1840s. The original cotton plantation owner, John T. Boykin, bought the piece of land the house is on in 1836. The house with its current 150 acres (61 ha) property, was listed on the National Register of Historic Places in 1975.

Its nomination describes much of its layout as follows:

Typical of many ante-bellum plantation houses along the river, Liberty Hill is a white frame Greek Revival home with four fluted Doric columns spanning the two-storey front porch. Built almost entirely from slave labor, the house followed the popular plan of many such river plantations. Consisting of two rooms separated by a central hall running the length of the house, it includes two one-storey shed rooms at the rear of the building, which were separated by an open porch.

It was deemed notable as

a significant example of an ante-bellum river plantation that was sustained by the booming cotton industry ... Built in the heyday of the South, it remained intact throughout the War and subsequent years when it has continued to be a private residence to the present day.
