= Jones Crossroads, Georgia =

Unincorporated community in Georgia, United States

Coordinates: 32°52′10.46″N 85°2′4.77″W

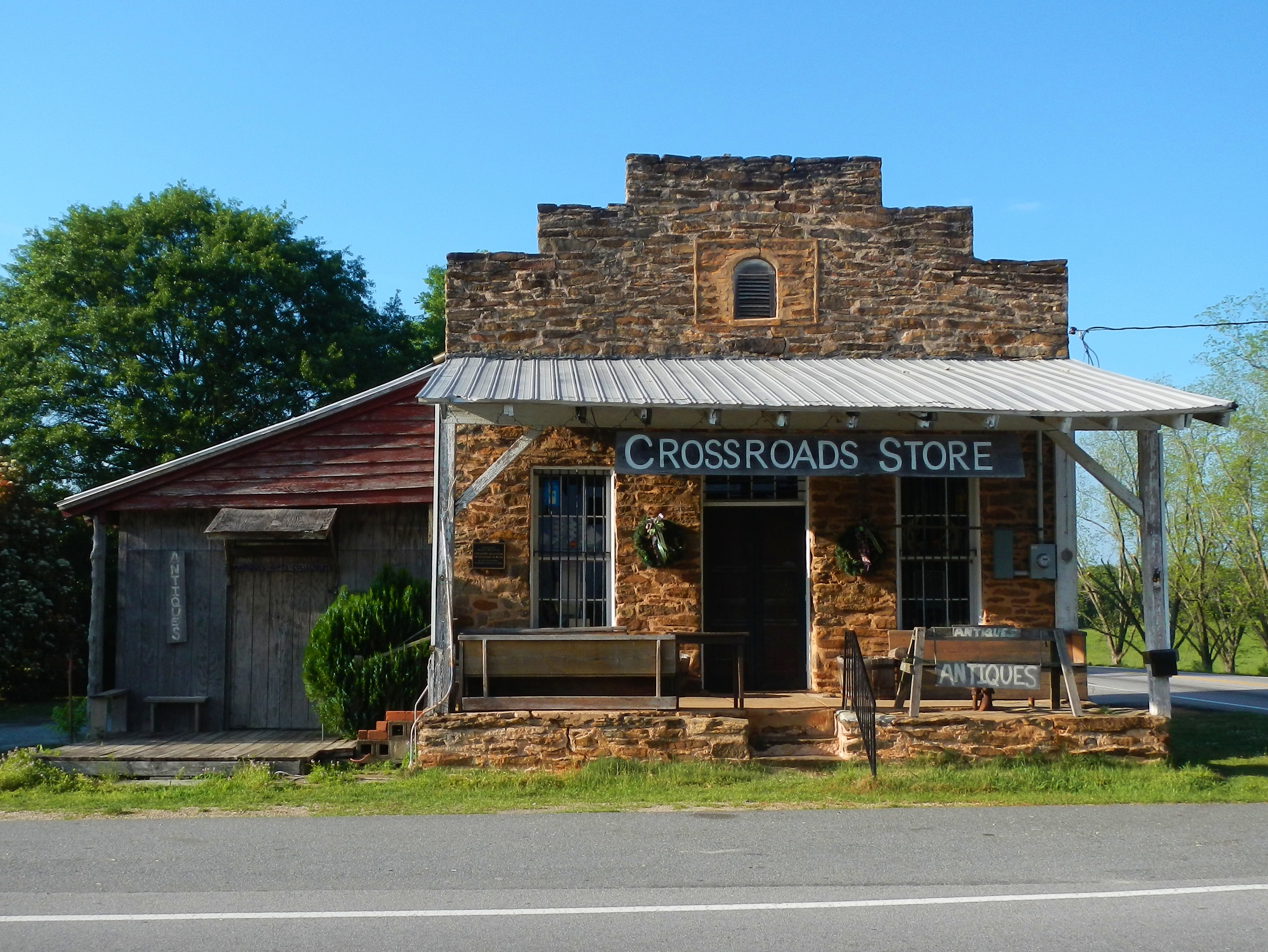
Historic R. M. Jones General Store

Jones Crossroads is an unincorporated community in Harris and Troup counties, in the U.S. state of Georgia.

== History ==
The community was named after Christopher Columbus Jones, the original owner of the town site. Previous variant names are "Palina", "Paulina" and "Union".

The R. M. Jones General Store, a historic country store listed on the National Register of Historic Places, stands at Jones Crossroads.
