= Harrisonville, Georgia =

Unincorporated community in Georgia, U.S.

Coordinates: 33°10′33″N 84°59′19″W

Harrisonville is an unincorporated community in Troup County, in the U.S. state of Georgia.

== History ==
A variant name was "Asbury". A post office called Asbury was established in 1848, and remained in operation until 1905. In 1900, the community had 53 inhabitants. Harrisonville was an incorporated town until its municipal charter was dissolved in 1995.
