= West Point, Georgia =

City in Georgia, United States

- City
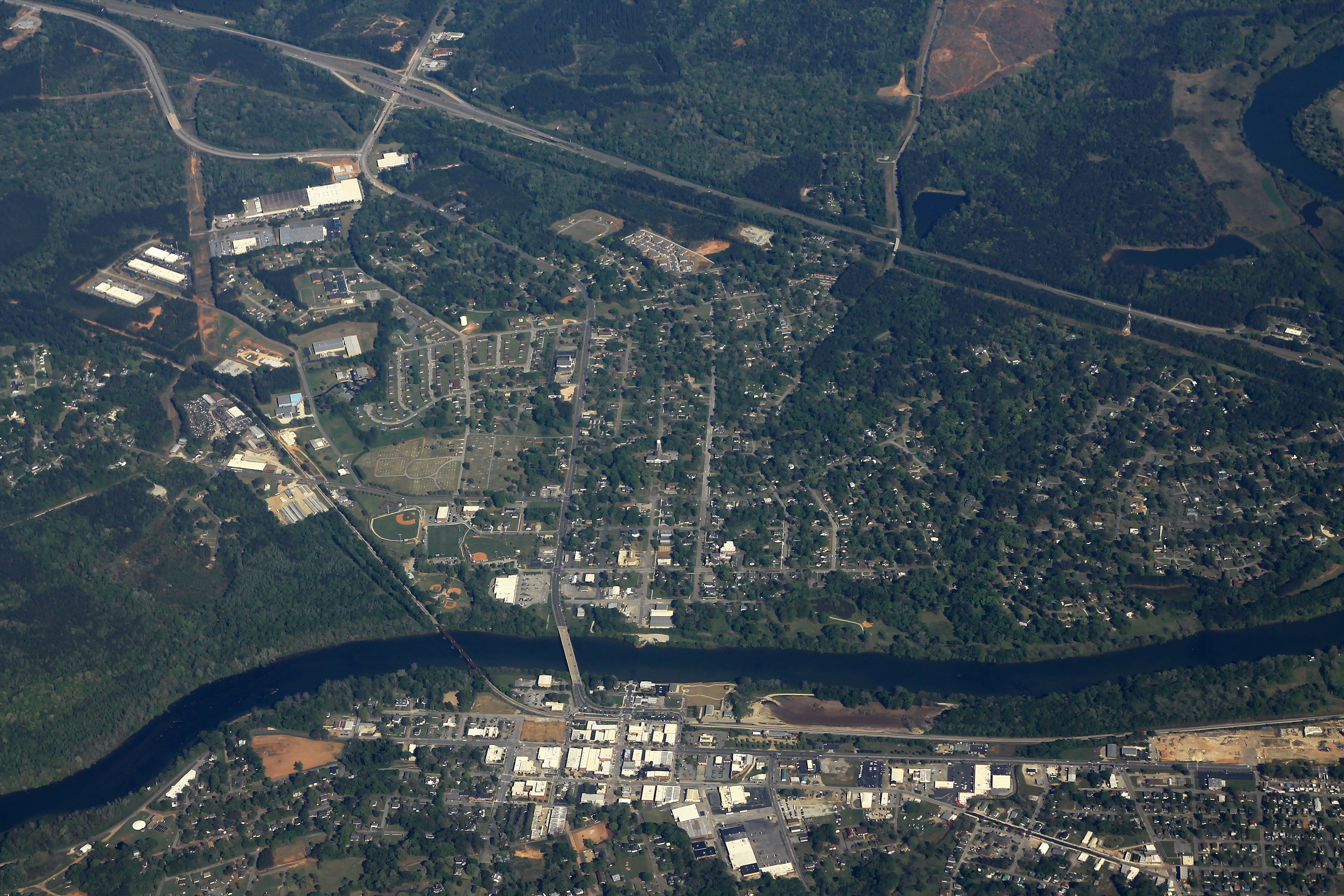
- Aerial view of West Point

- Logo

- Location in Troup County and Georgia
- Coordinates: 32°52′35″N 85°10′26″W
- Country: United States
- State: Georgia
- Counties: Troup, Harris

Government
  - Mayor: Steve Tramell

Area
  - Total: 11.85 sq mi (30.69 km^{2})
  - Land: 11.70 sq mi (30.29 km^{2})
  - Water: 0.15 sq mi (0.40 km^{2})
- Elevation: 568 ft (173 m)

Population (2020)
  - Total: 3,719
  - Density: 318.0/sq mi (122.78/km^{2})
- Time zone: UTC-5 (Eastern (EST))
  - Summer (DST): UTC-4 (EDT)
- ZIP code: 31833
- Area code: Area code 706
- FIPS code: 13-82132
- GNIS feature ID: 0333394
- Website: cityofwestpointga.com

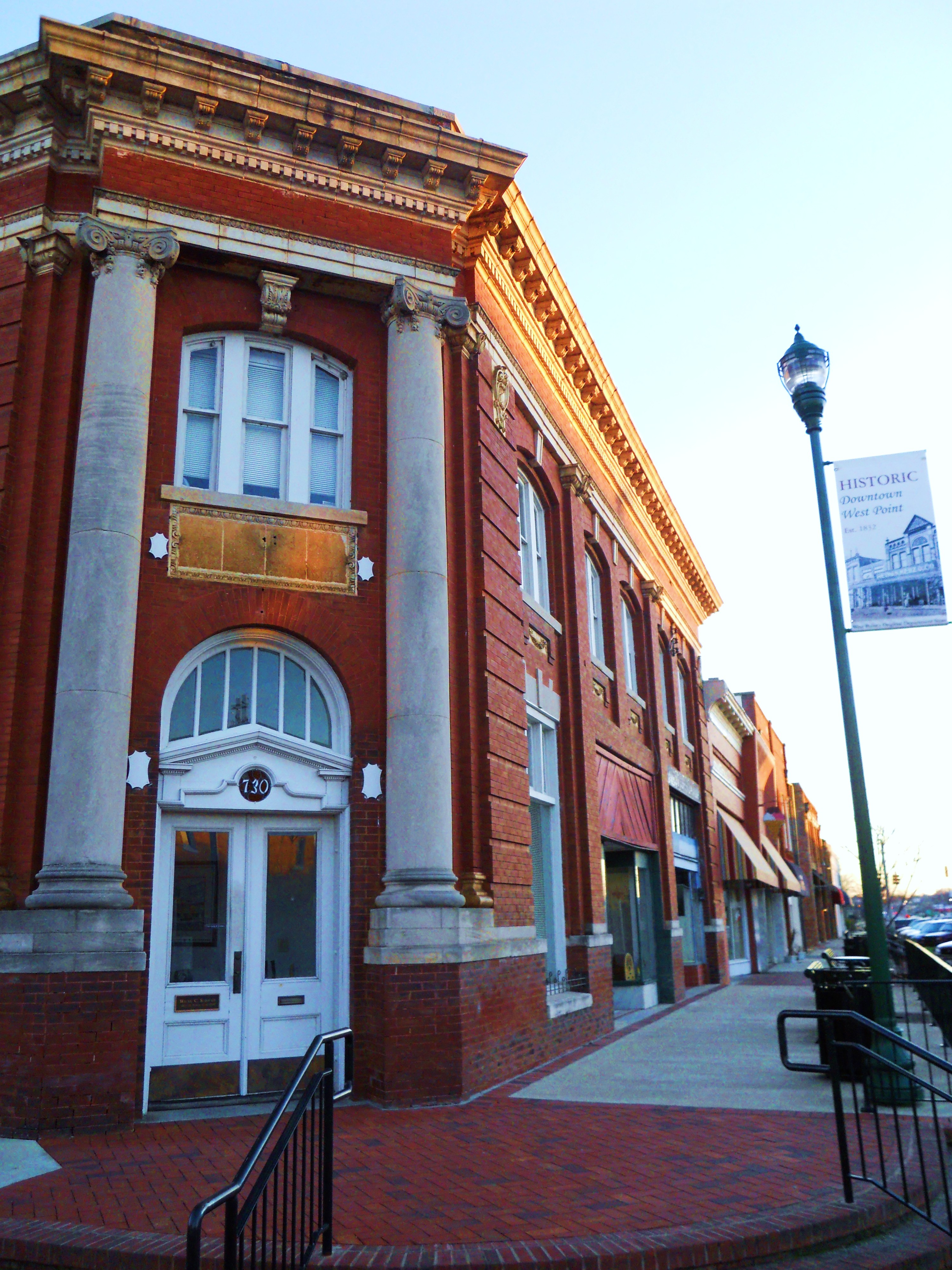
The West Point Commercial Historic District was added to the National Register of Historic Places on February 1, 2006.

West Point is a city in Troup and Harris counties in the U.S. state of Georgia. It is located approximately halfway between Montgomery, Alabama and Atlanta along Interstate 85. As of 2020, its population was 3,719. Most of the city is in Troup County, which is part of the LaGrange micropolitan statistical area, and hence part of the Atlanta-Athens-Clarke County-Sandy Springs, GA combined statistical area. A sliver in the south is in Harris County, which is part of the Columbus metropolitan statistical area. Despite being in both metropolitan areas however, it is a part of the Valley-Lanett Urban Area, which had a 2020 population of 20,466

== History ==
The city's present name comes from its being near the westernmost point of the Chattahoochee River, where the river turns from its southwesterly flow from the Appalachian Mountains to due south – for all practical purposes – and forms the boundary with Alabama. Prior to being named West Point, the area was commonly referred to as Miller's Bend.

The large nearby reservoir, West Point Lake, was created by the Army Corps of Engineers by the building of the West Point Dam, for water storage and hydroelectric power generation. The reservoir stores water which can be released during dry seasons, in order to maintain the water level of the navigable inland waterway from Columbus, Georgia, south to the Gulf of Mexico.

During the late spring of 2003, there was a flood caused by extremely heavy rainfall and thunderstorms upstream of the West Point Dam; the weather caused the water level in the reservoir to come close to overflowing the top of the dam. There were allegations of poor forecasting by the Corps of Engineers of the reservoir's water levels. The flood water would have overflowed the dam had a large amount of water not been released through the spillway of the dam. Whereas this prevented the catastrophic failure of the West Point Dam, the city endured a flood much more severe than any other in the time since the dam had been built.

In the mid-19th century, the Atlanta & LaGrange Railroad was established and soon renamed the Atlanta & West Point Railroad, using the name of West Point; the city of East Point, Fulton County, Georgia, received its name for being at the northeastern end of this railroad line. The rail line linked metropolitan Atlanta with the lower reaches of the Chattahoochee River, with Columbus, and with Montgomery, Alabama, via the Montgomery & West Point Railroad.

Passenger service between Atlanta and Montgomery continued, on the "West Point Route", until approximately the beginning of the Amtrak era, or more than 100 years (circa 1855–circa 1970). The Montgomery-to-West Point rail line was completed in 1851, three years before the West Point-to-Atlanta segment. Rail operations were seriously disrupted during the Civil War (1861–65), as Southern rail lines were subject to Union Army attacks.

Toward the end of the war, West Point was the scene of the Battle of West Point (April 16, 1865, seven days after Lee's surrender at Appomattox).

== Geography ==
West Point is located primarily in the southwest corner of Troup County, with a portion extending south into the northwest corner of Harris County. It is bordered to the northeast by the city of LaGrange, the Troup County seat. The city is bordered to the west by the Chattahoochee River, across which are the cities of Lanett and Valley, Alabama. According to the United States Census Bureau, the city has a total area of 11.3 square miles (29.2 km^{2}), of which 11.2 square miles (28.9 km^{2}) are land and 0.1 square miles (0.3 km^{2}), or 1.11%, are water.

Interstate 85 runs northeast to southwest through the city, leading northeast 81 miles (130 km) to Atlanta and southwest 81 miles (130 km) to Montgomery, Alabama. Other highways that run through the city include U.S. Route 29, Georgia State Route 18, and Georgia State Route 103.

=== Climate ===
Climate data for West Point, Georgia, 1991–2020 normals, extremes 1891–2015
Month	Jan	Feb	Mar	Apr	May	Jun	Jul	Aug	Sep	Oct	Nov	Dec	Year
Record high °F (°C)	80 (27)	84 (29)	95 (35)	94 (34)	100 (38)	104 (40)	106 (41)	106 (41)	106 (41)	99 (37)	93 (34)	80 (27)	106 (41)
Mean maximum °F (°C)	71.4 (21.9)	74.9 (23.8)	81.8 (27.7)	86.0 (30.0)	90.6 (32.6)	95.3 (35.2)	97.2 (36.2)	96.6 (35.9)	92.6 (33.7)	86.2 (30.1)	79.2 (26.2)	72.9 (22.7)	98.5 (36.9)
Mean daily maximum °F (°C)	55.6 (13.1)	59.5 (15.3)	67.0 (19.4)	74.6 (23.7)	81.8 (27.7)	87.6 (30.9)	90.4 (32.4)	89.4 (31.9)	84.2 (29.0)	75.1 (23.9)	65.8 (18.8)	57.9 (14.4)	74.1 (23.4)
Daily mean °F (°C)	43.8 (6.6)	47.1 (8.4)	53.9 (12.2)	61.0 (16.1)	69.4 (20.8)	76.4 (24.7)	79.7 (26.5)	78.9 (26.1)	73.5 (23.1)	62.7 (17.1)	53.0 (11.7)	46.3 (7.9)	62.1 (16.8)
Mean daily minimum °F (°C)	32.0 (0.0)	34.8 (1.6)	40.8 (4.9)	47.5 (8.6)	57.1 (13.9)	65.3 (18.5)	69.1 (20.6)	68.4 (20.2)	62.8 (17.1)	50.2 (10.1)	40.3 (4.6)	34.7 (1.5)	50.3 (10.1)
Mean minimum °F (°C)	16.4 (−8.7)	20.7 (−6.3)	26.7 (−2.9)	33.7 (0.9)	44.3 (6.8)	56.0 (13.3)	62.7 (17.1)	62.0 (16.7)	49.7 (9.8)	35.6 (2.0)	28.0 (−2.2)	20.0 (−6.7)	13.4 (−10.3)
Record low °F (°C)	−8 (−22)	5 (−15)	11 (−12)	26 (−3)	35 (2)	43 (6)	53 (12)	52 (11)	35 (2)	24 (−4)	8 (−13)	1 (−17)	−8 (−22)
Average precipitation inches (mm)	4.88 (124)	4.71 (120)	5.31 (135)	4.59 (117)	3.89 (99)	3.90 (99)	4.70 (119)	3.98 (101)	3.67 (93)	3.12 (79)	4.37 (111)	5.42 (138)	52.54 (1,335)
Average snowfall inches (cm)	0.0 (0.0)	0.0 (0.0)	0.0 (0.0)	0.0 (0.0)	0.0 (0.0)	0.0 (0.0)	0.0 (0.0)	0.0 (0.0)	0.0 (0.0)	0.0 (0.0)	0.0 (0.0)	0.1 (0.25)	0.1 (0.25)
Average precipitation days (≥ 0.01 in)	8.8	8.4	7.6	7.1	7.0	9.5	9.0	8.2	6.8	5.7	6.8	8.7	93.6
Average snowy days (≥ 0.1 in)	0.0	0.0	0.0	0.0	0.0	0.0	0.0	0.0	0.0	0.0	0.0	0.1	0.1
Source 1: NOAA
Source 2: National Weather Service (mean maxima/minima 1981–2010)

== Demographics ==
Historical population
Census	Pop.	Note	%±
1870	1,405		—
1880	1,178		−16.2%
1890	1,254		6.5%
1900	1,797		43.3%
1910	1,906		6.1%
1920	2,138		12.2%
1930	2,145		0.3%
1940	3,591		67.4%
1950	4,076		13.5%
1960	4,610		13.1%
1970	4,232		−8.2%
1980	4,305		1.7%
1990	3,571		−17.0%
2000	3,382		−5.3%
2010	3,474		2.7%
2020	3,719		7.1%
U.S. Decennial Census; 1850-1870 1870-1880; 1890-1910 1920-1930; 1940 1950 1960; 1970 1980 1990; 2000 2010

=== Racial and ethnic composition ===
West Point city, Georgia – Racial and ethnic composition Note: the US Census treats Hispanic/Latino as an ethnic category. This table excludes Latinos from the racial categories and assigns them to a separate category. Hispanics/Latinos may be of any race.
Race / Ethnicity (NH = Non-Hispanic)	Pop 2000	Pop 2010	Pop 2020	% 2000	% 2010	% 2020
White alone (NH)	1,364	1,315	1,387	40.33%	37.85%	37.29%
Black or African American alone (NH)	1,948	1,993	2,041	57.60%	57.37%	54.88%
Native American or Alaska Native alone (NH)	1	7	12	0.03%	0.20%	0.32%
Asian alone (NH)	30	34	66	0.89%	0.98%	1.77%
Native Hawaiian or Pacific Islander alone (NH)	0	0	1	0.00%	0.00%	0.03%
Other race alone (NH)	1	1	18	0.03%	0.03%	0.48%
Mixed race or Multiracial (NH)	17	38	108	0.50%	1.09%	2.90%
Hispanic or Latino (any race)	21	86	86	0.62%	2.48%	2.31%
Total	3,382	3,474	3,719	100.00%	100.00%	100.00%

=== 2020 census ===
As of the 2020 census, West Point had a population of 3,719. The median age was 37.8 years. 22.5% of residents were under the age of 18 and 18.1% were 65 years of age or older. For every 100 females, there were 88.7 males, and for every 100 females age 18 and over, there were 82.1 males age 18 and over.

86.0% of residents lived in urban areas, while 14.0% lived in rural areas.

There were 1,421 households in West Point, including 970 families. Of all households, 32.4% had children under the age of 18 living in them. Married-couple households were 33.6% of households, while 19.7% had a male householder with no spouse or partner present and 40.5% had a female householder with no spouse or partner present. About 28.7% of all households were made up of individuals, and 13.2% had someone living alone who was 65 years of age or older.

There were 1,627 housing units, of which 12.7% were vacant. The homeowner vacancy rate was 1.6%, and the rental vacancy rate was 10.2%.

== Economy ==
Kia Motors opened an automobile factory in West Point in 2009. Since 2011, the West Point auto factory has been manufacturing models of the Kia K5, Kia Sorento, Kia Sportage, and Kia Telluride. The Kia Motors Manufacturing Georgia also manufactures the Kia Sorento's sibling, the Hyundai Santa Fe to get more Sonatas in Alabama.

Batson-Cook Construction was founded in West Point in 1913. It continues to be headquartered in West Point.

West Point Iron Works was founded in West Point three years after the Civil War ended. The company started off as a supplier of individual components, such as pulleys and gears, to nearby textile mills. In the 1930s the company was renamed West Point Foundry and Machine Co. In the 2000s, having been negatively impacted by imports (cloth) the company turned to SEETAC to seek assistance to use the firm's engineering and production expertise to provide products to the U.S. military. The firm also changed its name to West Point Industries to emphasize its broader client base. West Point now also makes component parts for manufacturers in a wide range of industries.

== Education ==
Troup County High School and Long Cane Middle School, located in LaGrange, serve the children of West Point and the surrounding area.

Point University, formerly Atlanta Christian College, a private Christian university in East Point, moved their campus to West Point in 2012.

== Notable people ==
- Drew Ferguson, politician
- Dorothy Kirby, professional golfer
- Alex Moore, American football player
- Joe Palmisano, baseball player
- Ansley Truitt, basketball player

== Gallery ==
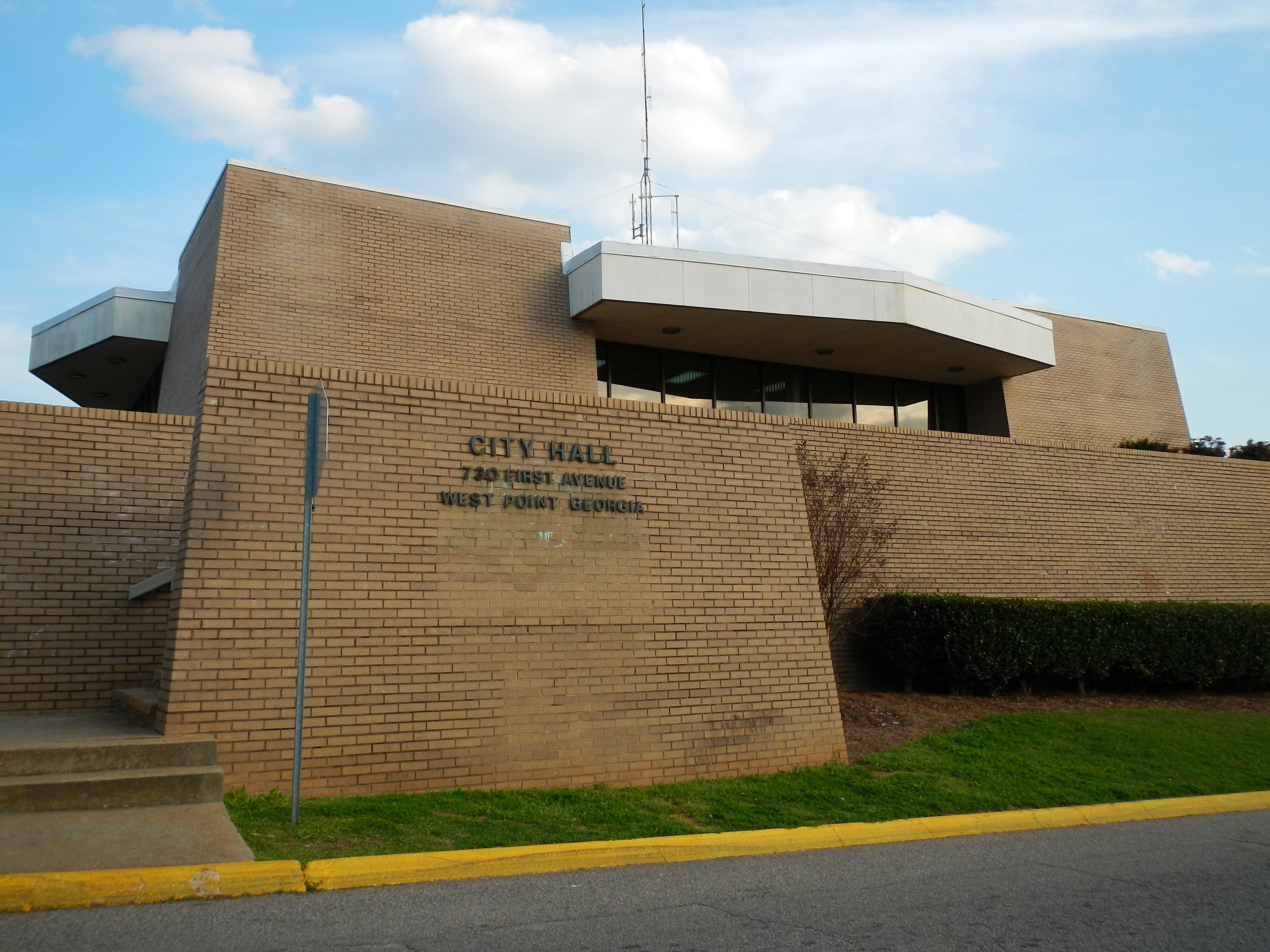
West Point City Hall

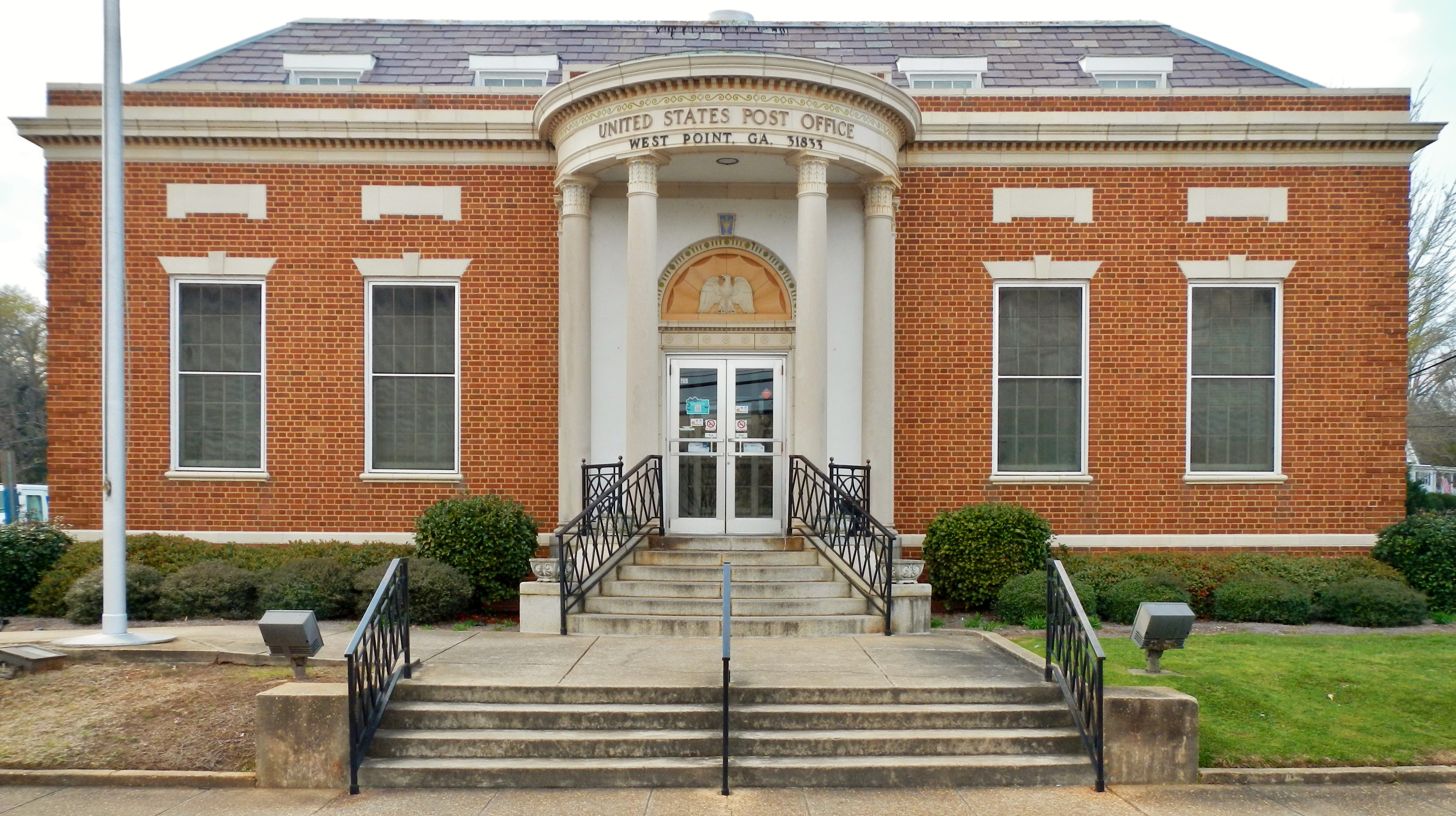
West Point Post Office (ZIP code: 31833)

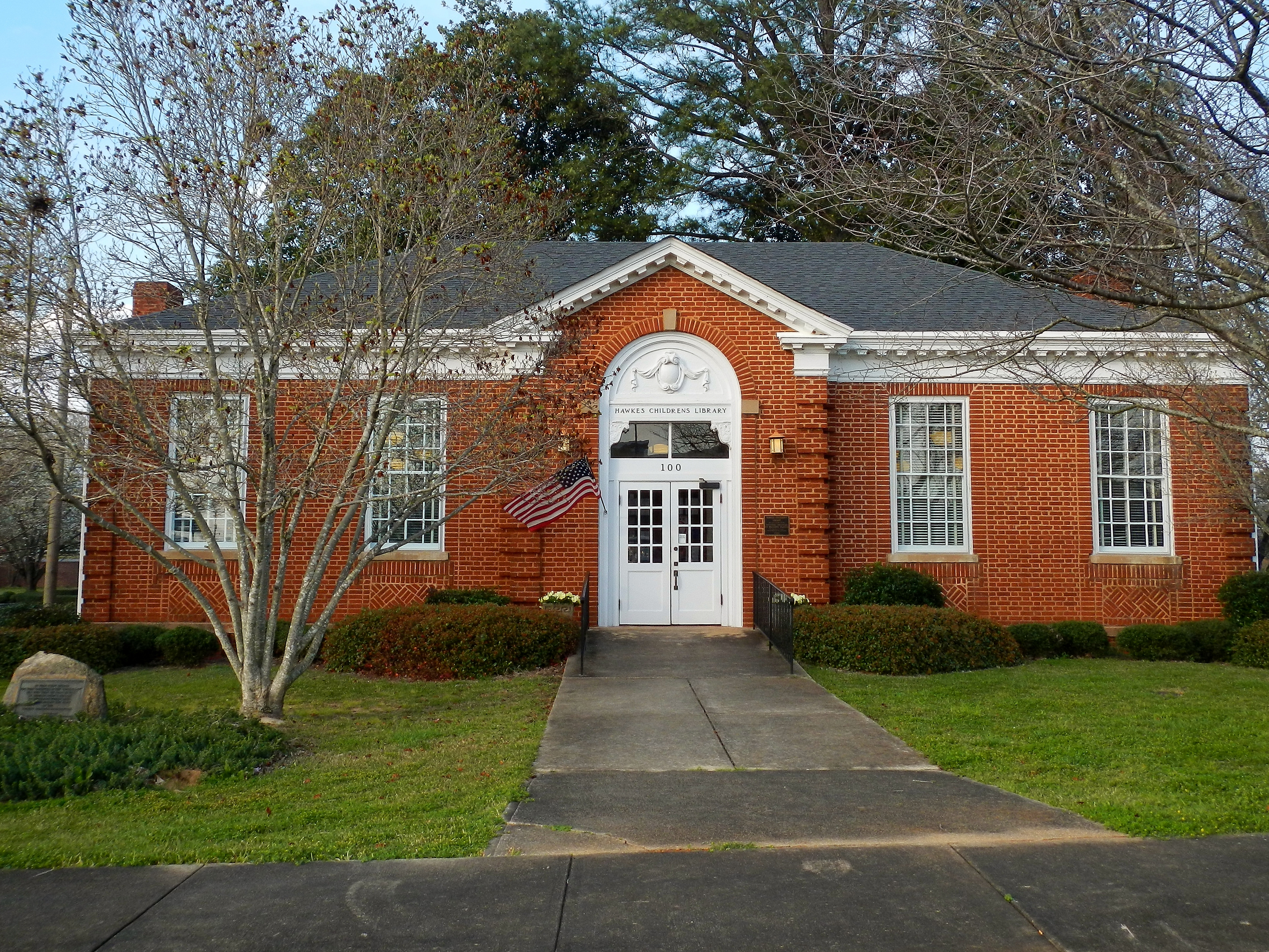
Hawkes Children's Library of West Point was built in 1922 and added to the National Register of Historic Places on December 28, 1990.

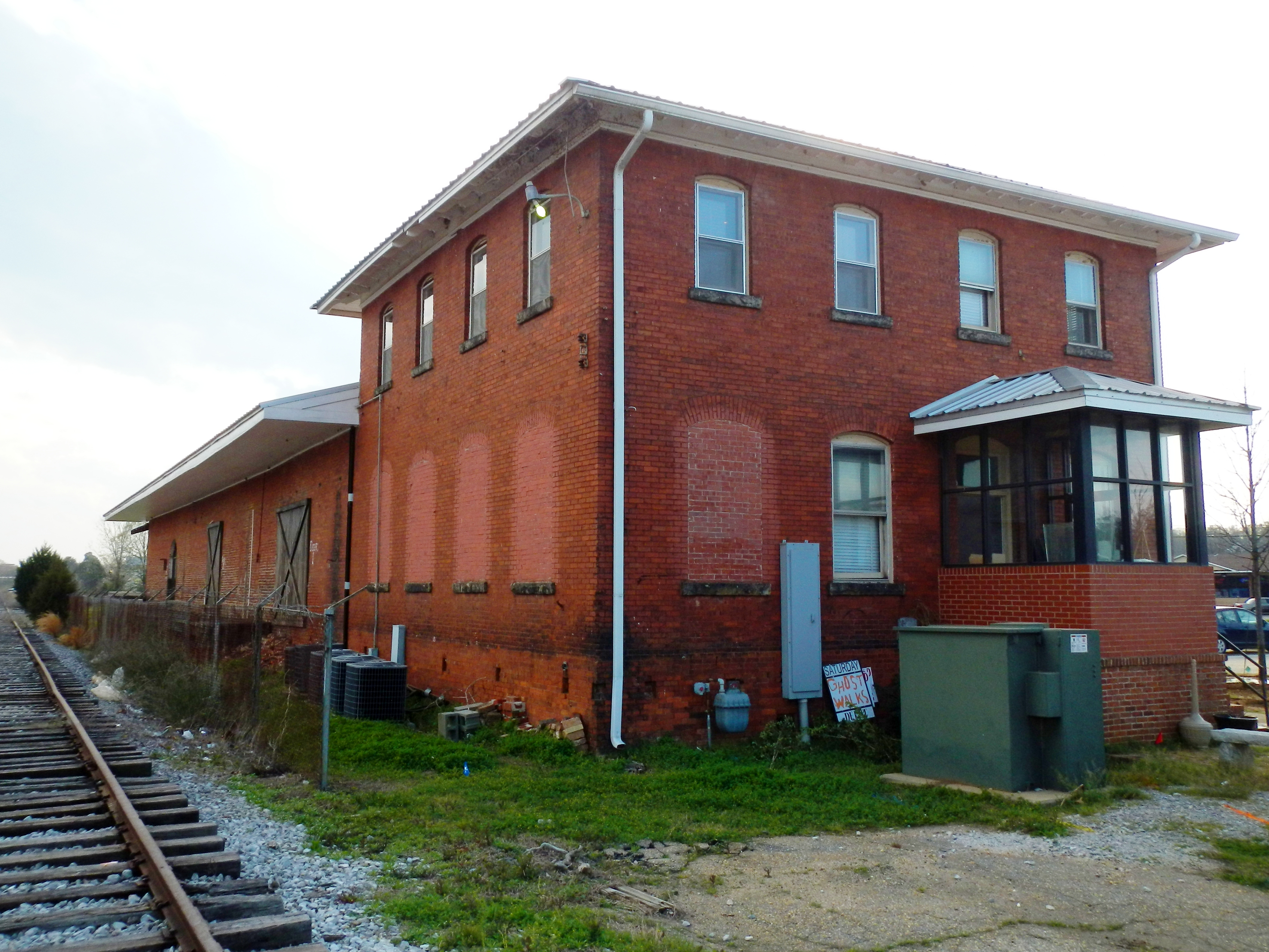
West Point Freight Depot was built in 1887 and added to the National Register of Historic Places on February 24, 2005.

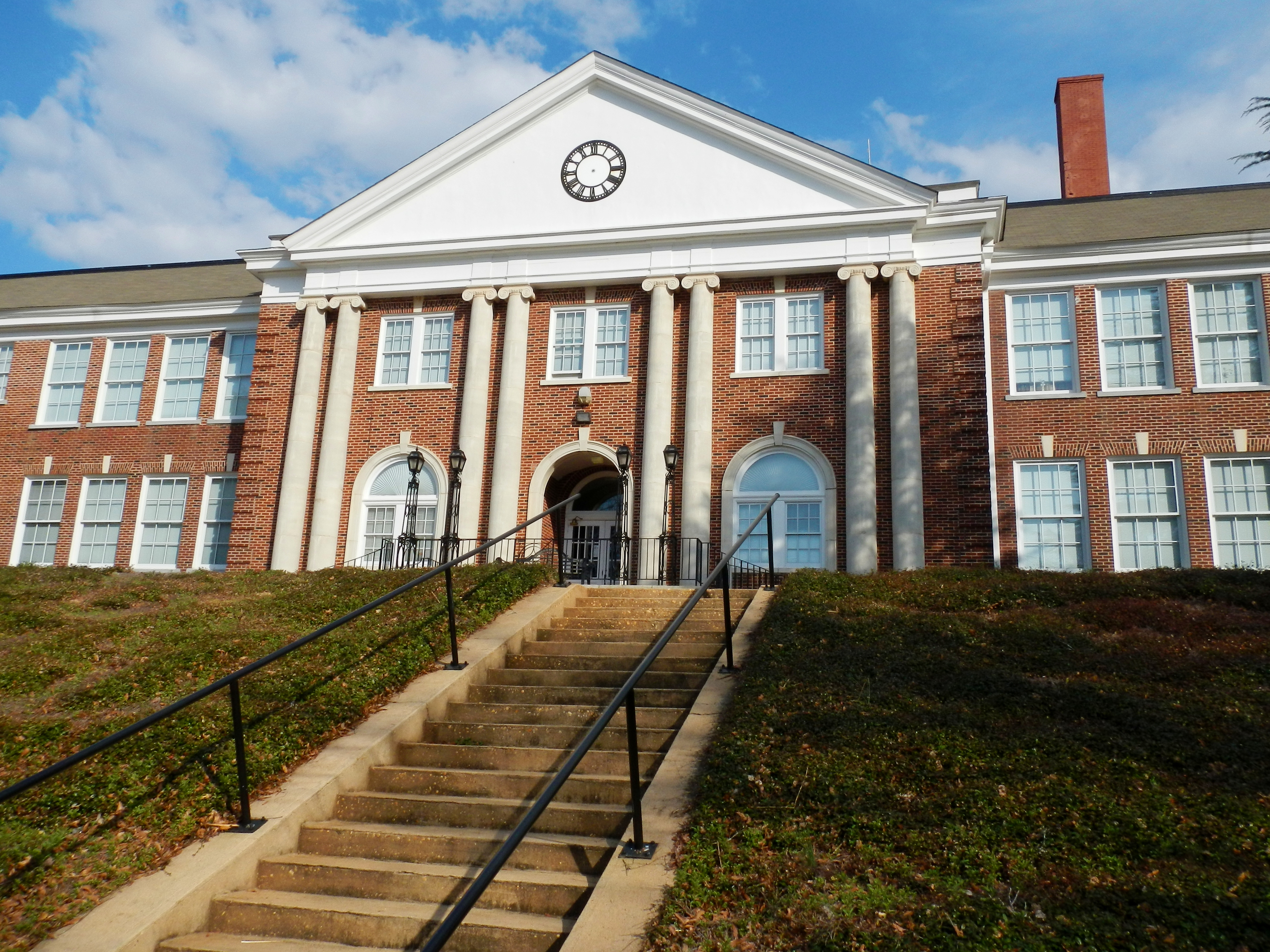
West Point Public School was added to the National Register of Historic Places on April 1, 1999.

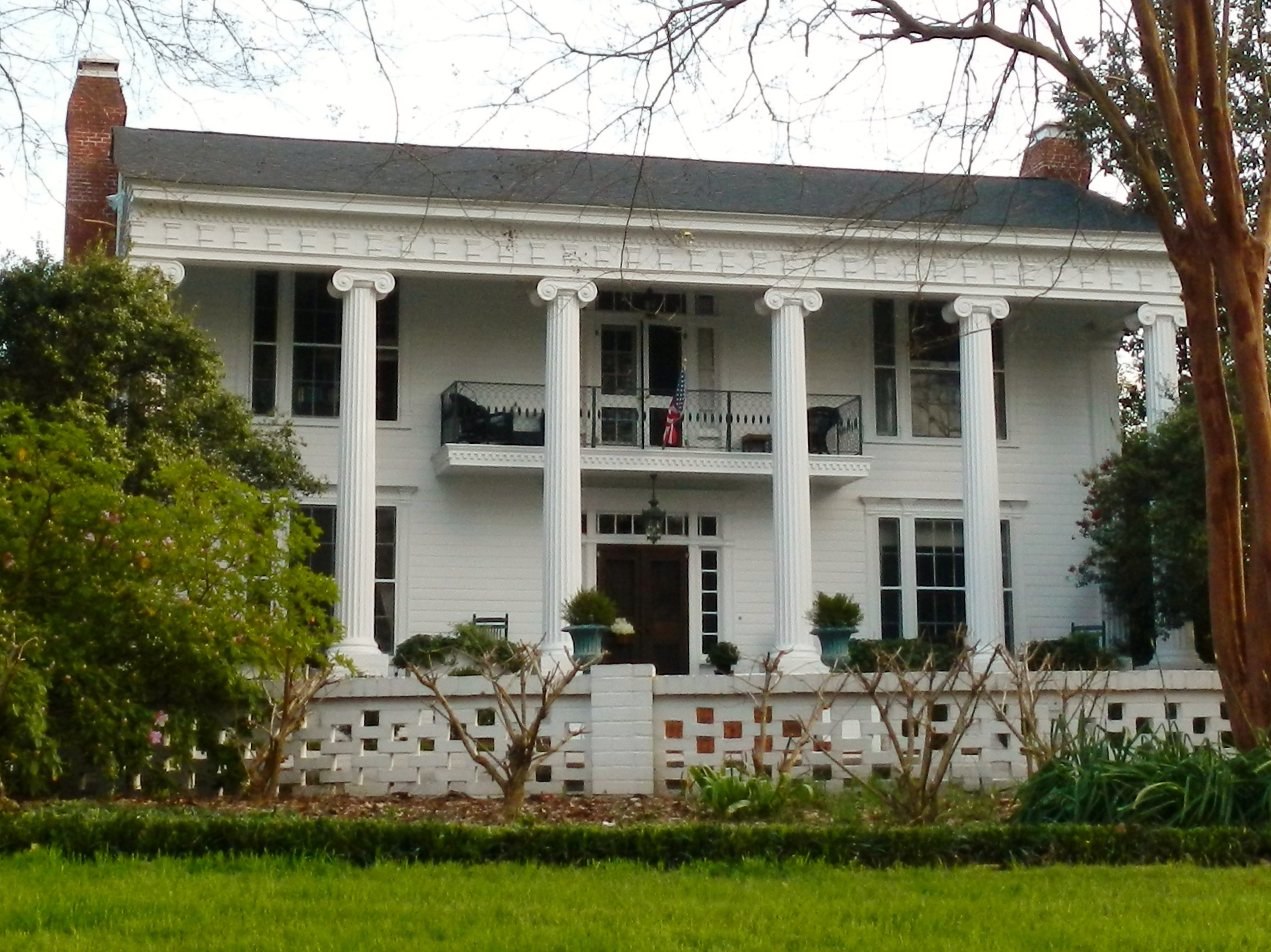
White Hall is a Greek Revival-style plantation home built in 1857 and added to the National Register of Historic Places on August 19, 1974.

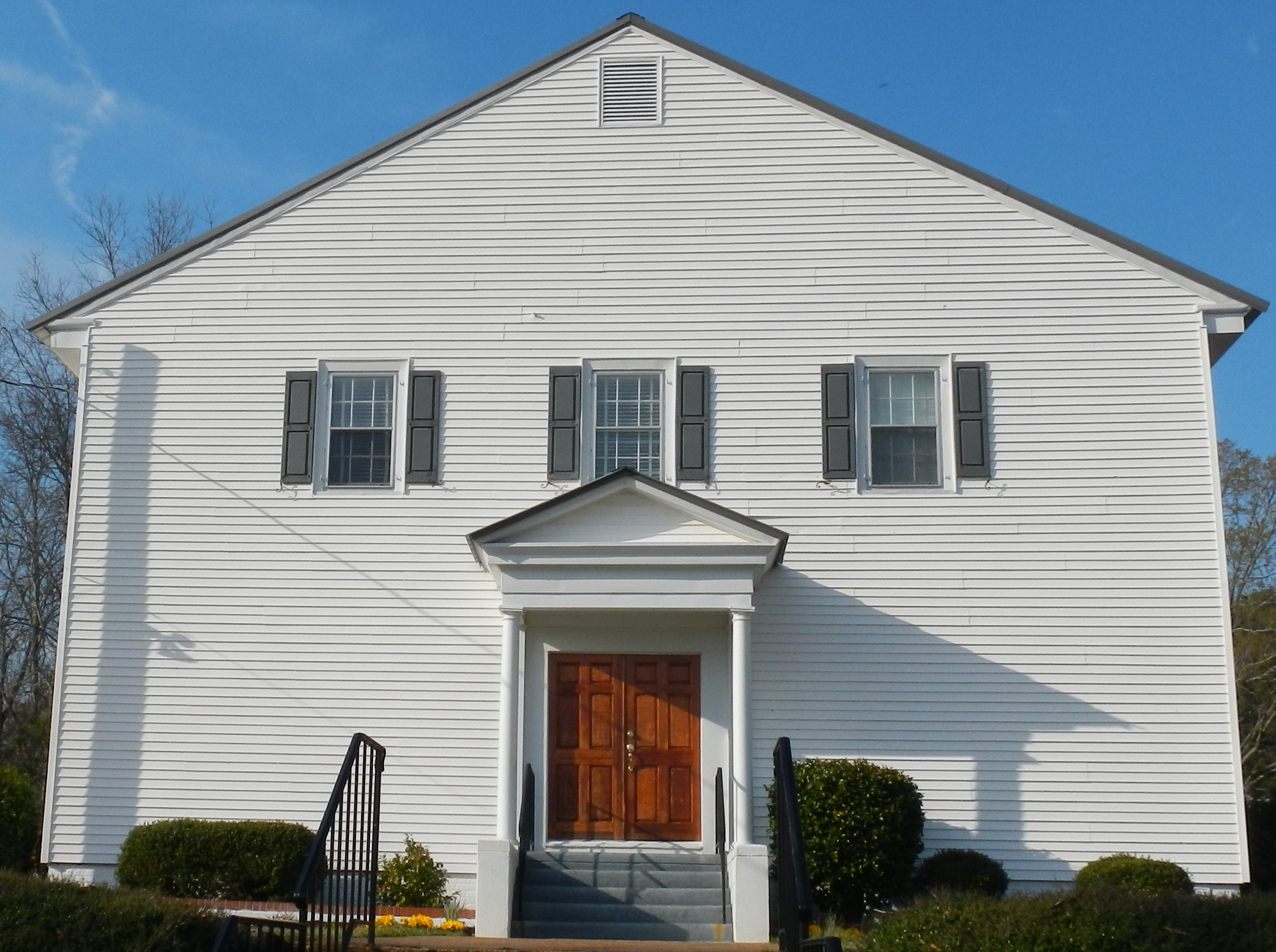
Long Cane Historic District was added to the National Register of Historic Places on May 24, 1976.

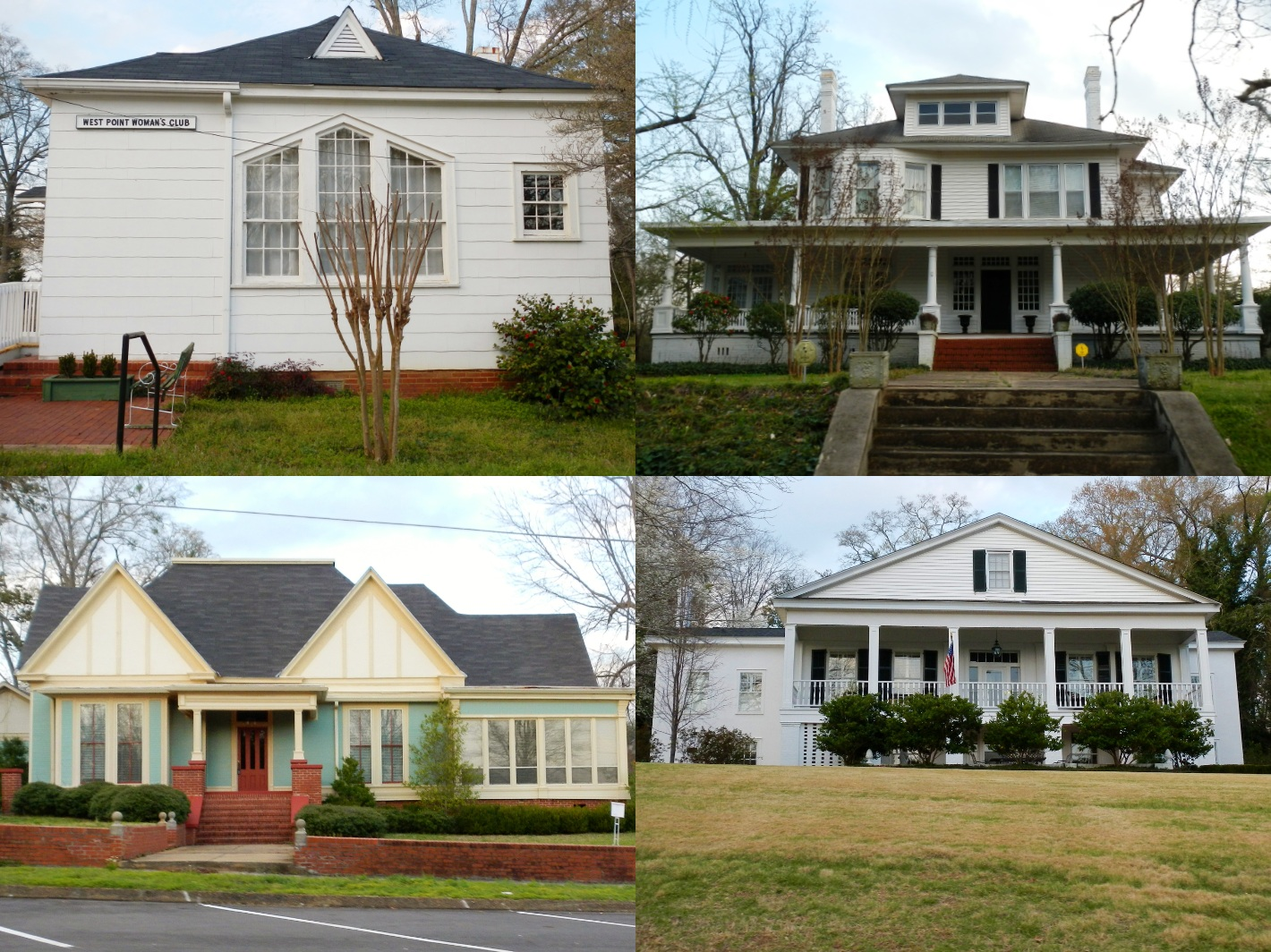
Westside Historic District was added to the National Register of Historic Places on May 11, 2011.

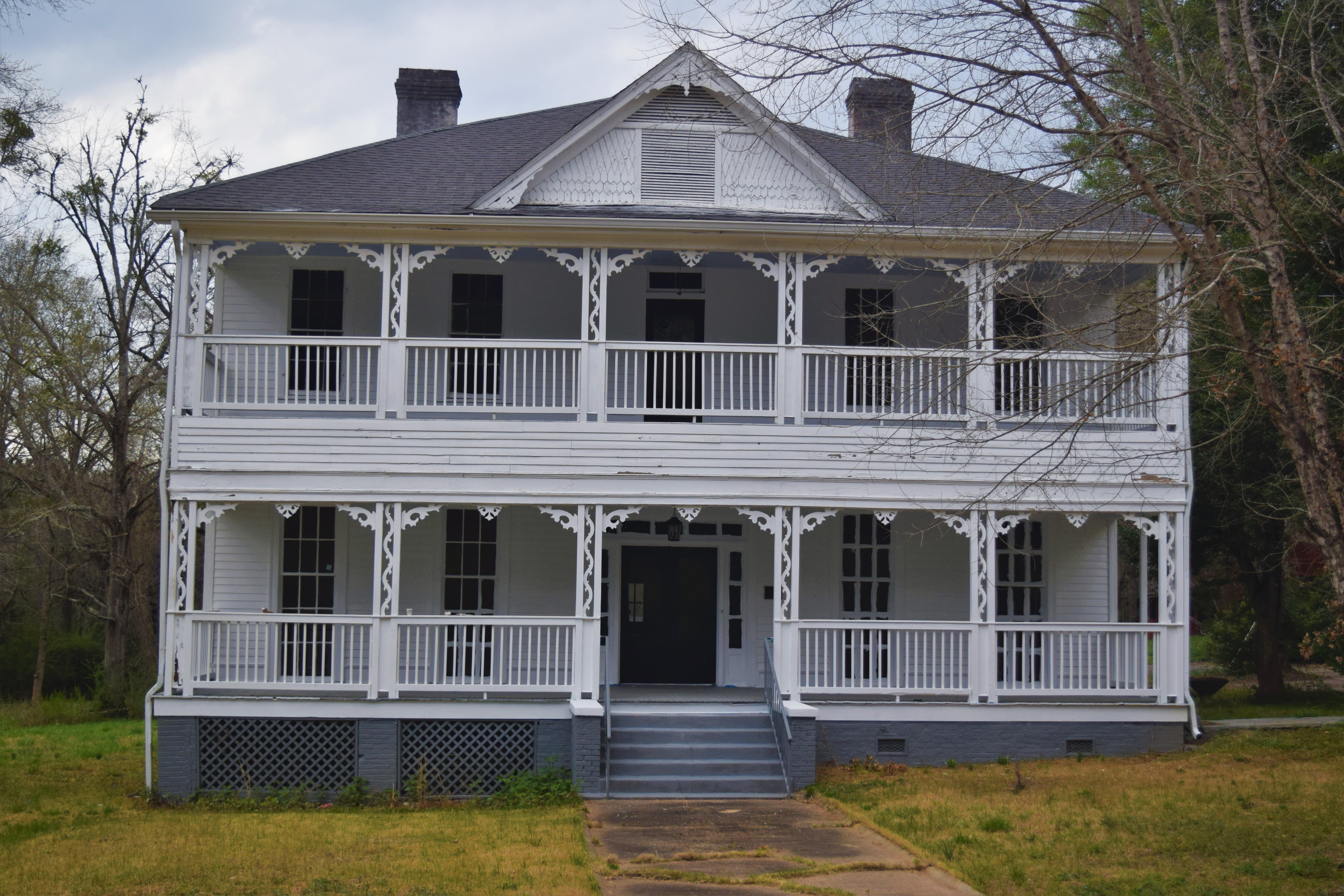
The Henry and Lura Miller House was added to the National Register of Historic Places on December 21, 2020.
