= McFarland-Render House =

- U.S. National Register of Historic Places
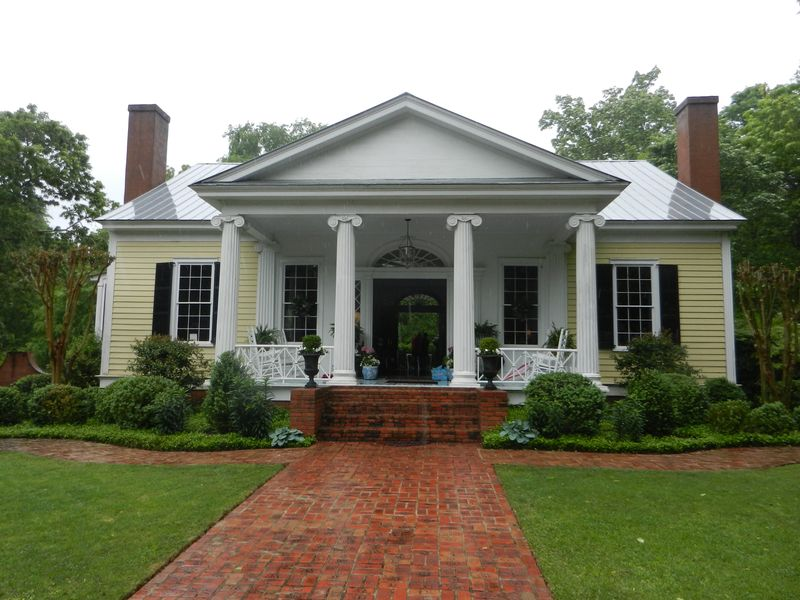
- The McFarland-Render House in 2013

- Location within Georgia
- Location: 101 Bill Hart Rd., Newnan, Georgia
- Coordinates: 33°21′03.0″N 84°42′17.2″W
- Area: 7 acres (2.8 ha)
- Built: 1830–33
- Built by: Collin Rodgers
- Architect: Collin Rodgers
- Architectural style: Greek Revival
- NRHP reference No.: 78001008
- Added to NRHP: November 29, 1978

The McFarland-Render House, also known as Magnolias or The Magnolias Plantation, is a one-and-a-half-story Greek Revival-style plantation home in Newnan, Georgia. The McFarland-Render House was built from 1830 to 1833 by Collin Rodgers, a Troup County architect and craftsman. for Joseph D. McFarland, a physician from Scotland.

The McFarland-Render House was documented by the Historic American Buildings Survey in 1936, and was listed on the National Register of Historic Places in 1978.

In 1997, the McFarland-Render House was moved from 612 Hines Street in LaGrange 32 miles northwest to 101 Bill Hart Road in Newnan, Georgia. After the move and extensive renovation, the home and its new owner were featured in the October 1999 issue of House Beautiful magazine.

== Gallery ==
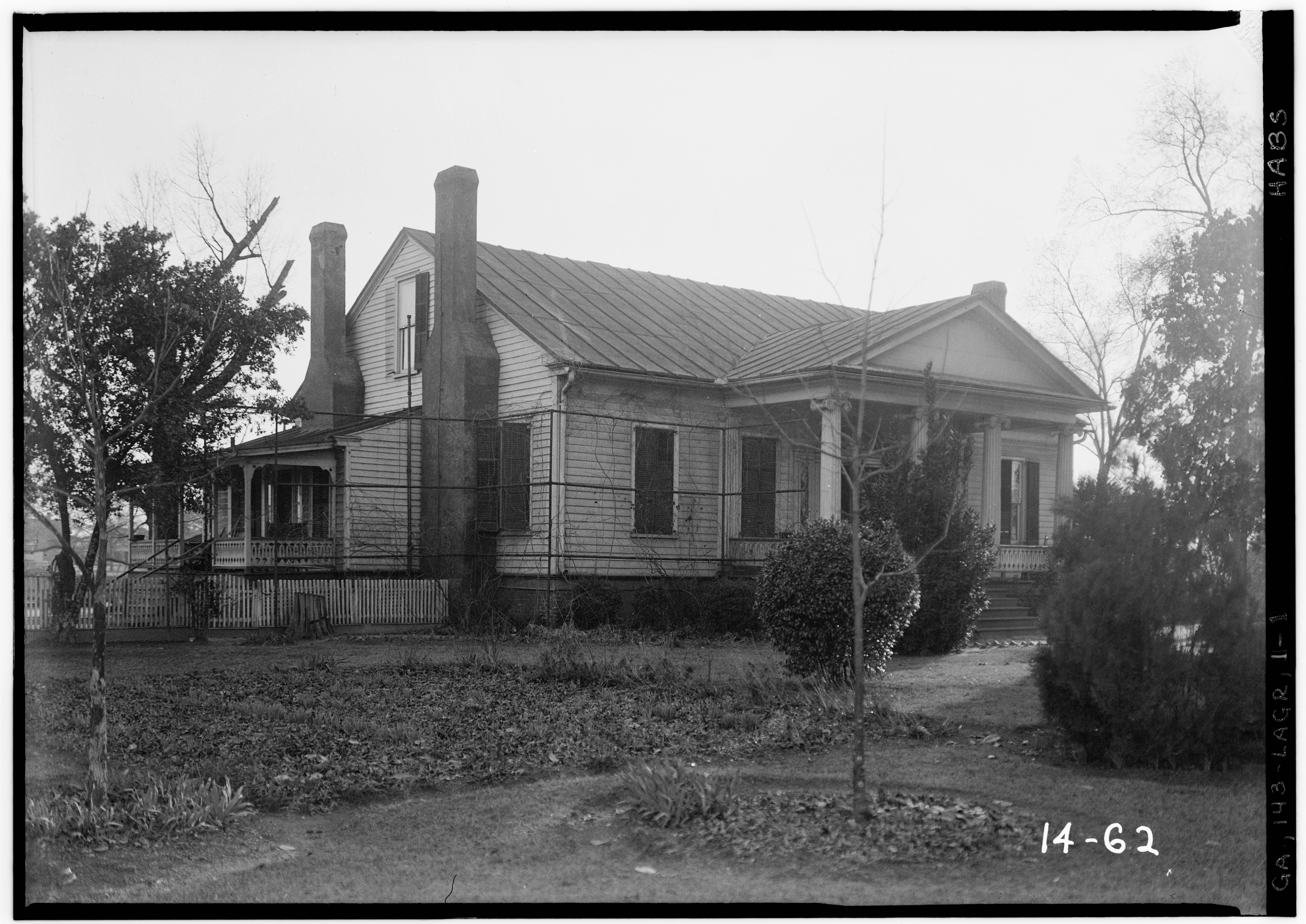
Historic American Buildings Survey photograph of the McFarland-Render House circa 1936.
