= The Burnt Village =

Coordinates: 33.009°N 85.181°W

The Burnt Village (9TP9) was an historic Native American archaeological site located under West Point Reservoir in Troup County, Georgia. The settlement, also known by the Creek name Okfuskenena, was a trading crossroads for natives west of the Chattahoochee River, and reportedly a center for raiding parties against American expansionist efforts in the late 18th century. The village was attacked on September 27, 1793, by a party of white men attempting to rout the Creek population from the state. Several Indians were killed, and the village was burnt to the ground, leading to its characteristic name.

From 1966 to 1969, Harold Huscher of the Smithsonian Institution conducted excavations of the area before it was flooded by the West Point Reservoir in 1971. Though the location was lost to history, regional survey and later excavation located a small area that fit within the proper time period of the historic village. According to his data, the village contained a number of curved wooden "rotundas" or "council houses", suggesting a series of tribal meeting places within the relatively small town. Later work by Mark Williams of the University of Georgia suggests that Huscher's original theories were incorrect, as the actual recovered data was not consistent enough to suggest overall settlement patterning. Even with improper analysis by the original investigators, in modern reckoning Okfuskenena is considered the most completely and thoroughly excavated historic Creek town in the state of Georgia.

Today, the site is unreachable at the bottom of West Point Lake. However, continuing research by the University of Georgia researchers, including ceramic analysis and building distribution continues to provide a wealth of information about historic Creek society.
