= Collin Rogers =

American architect

Collin Rogers (May 7, 1791 – October 25, 1845) was an American master builder and neoclassical architect. He designed and built houses for antebellum planters in Troup and Coweta Counties in Georgia. His first name is also spelled as Cullen or Cullin, his surname as Rogers.

== Works ==
Rogers, a builder by trade, worked in partnership with his brother Henry. By 1830 Henry owned around thirty slaves employed as construction hands and craftsmen. Rogers did not receive a formal training in architecture. Rogers, like his contemporary Daniel Pratt, was influenced by the works and ideas of Asher Benjamin (The American Builder's Companion) and Edward Shaw.

Six extant houses designed and built by Rogers in the 1830s are listed on the National Register of Historic Places in Georgia:

- McFarland-Render House (The Magnolias), La Grange (1830–1833), moved to Coweta County and restored
- Henderson-Orr House, Stallings Crossing, Coweta County (1828 home-enlarged by Rogers in 1832)
- Nutwood, La Grange (1833)
- Nathan Van Boddie House, La Grange (1836)
- Edwards-Phillips House, La Grange (1835–1840) (Now demolished)
- Fannin-Truitt-Handley Place, La Grange (1835–1840) (Now demolished)

Rogers designs followed the standard Georgian floor plan with four rooms divided with a central hall. He employed four-column porticos and diamond-shaped sidelights. According to the authors of The Architecture of Georgia, his La Grange houses, built in the 1830s, look "old-fashioned" in the sense that they followed the pattern set by Daniel Pratt in Milledgeville in the 1820s.

His trademark was a 6 pointed star in the center of the volute of the Ionic columns of his works.

Rogers also served as the county judge of inferior court (county commissioner) in 1832–1833 and in 1837–1842.

== See also ==
- Antebellum architecture
