= Nutwood (La Grange, Georgia) =

Historic house in Georgia, United States

- U.S. National Register of Historic Places
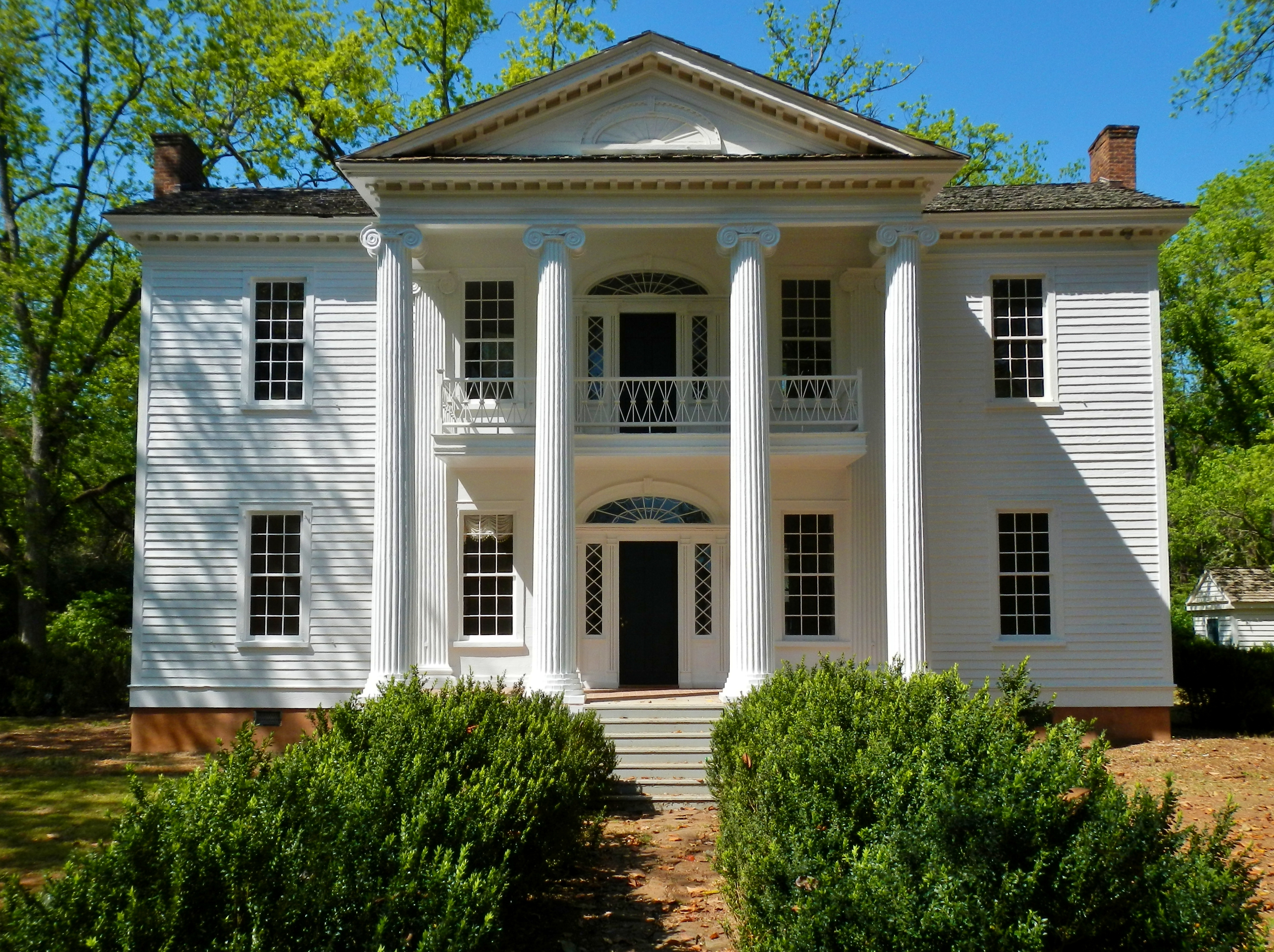
- Nutwood in 2012

- Location within Georgia Location within the United States
- Nearest city: La Grange, Georgia
- Coordinates: 33°1′21″N 84°59′41″W
- Built: 1833
- Architect: Rodgers, Cullen
- Architectural style: Greek Revival, Federal, Plantation plain
- NRHP reference No.: 74000704
- Added to NRHP: May 08, 1974

Nutwood in LaGrange, Georgia, in Troup County, is a building built in 1833. It was listed on the National Register of Historic Places in 1974.

The Nutwood home was built by Joel Dortch Newsom, who relocated to LaGrange from Hancock County in 1830. The house stands on what was then the Newsom family plantation, east of LaGrange. It was designed by architect Collin Rodgers and still bears the architect's signature medallion above the side entrance. The private Newsom family cemetery in nearby grove features imported marble tombstones.

The home is a private residence and is not open to the public, however, Nutwood Winery and its vineyards were built next door to the home in 2019 and are open to the public Thursday–Saturday.
