= Bellevue (LaGrange, Georgia) =

Historic house in Georgia, United States

- U.S. National Register of Historic Places
- U.S. National Historic Landmark
- U.S. Historic district – Contributing property
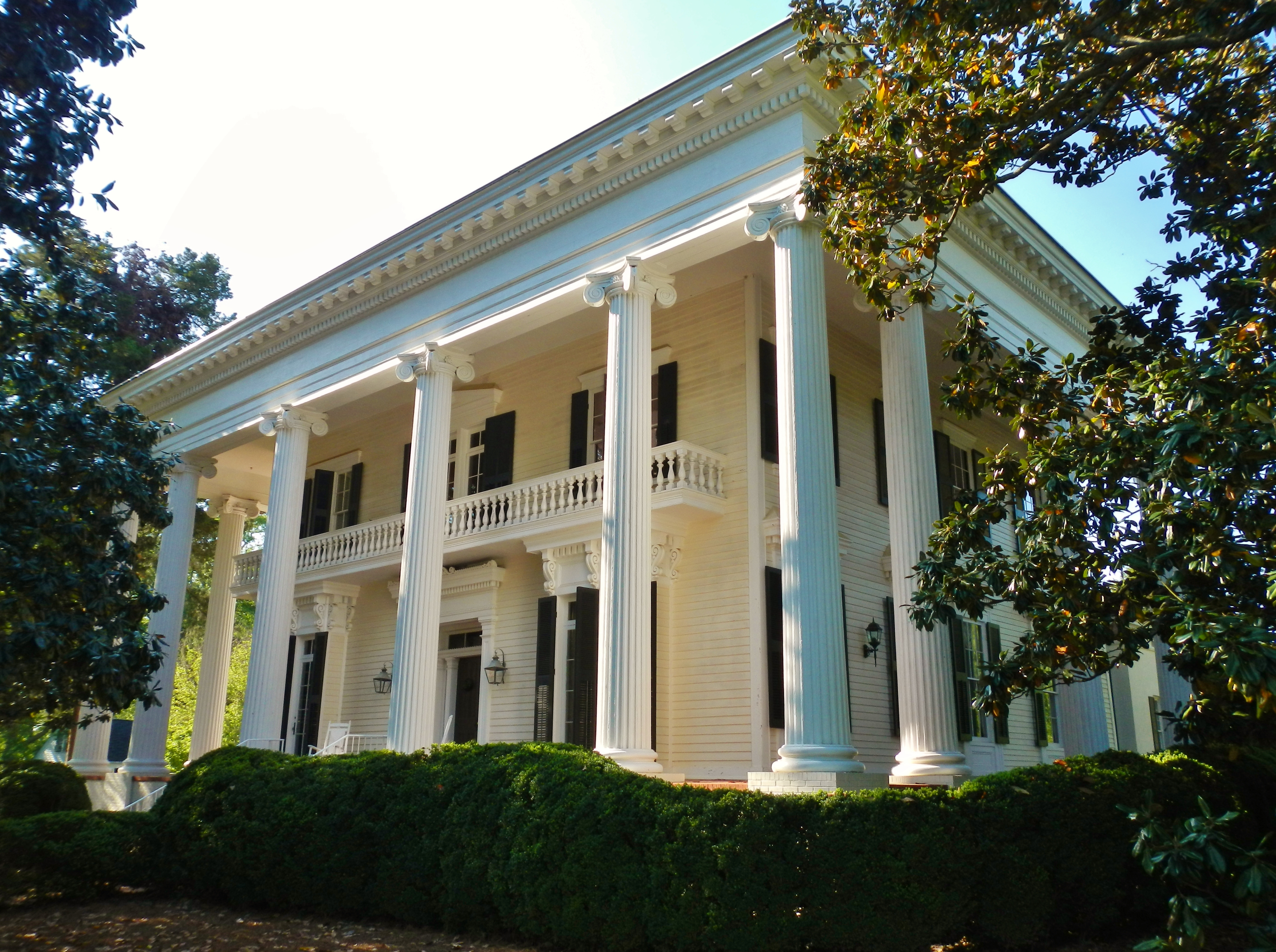
- Bellevue in 2012

- Location within Georgia Location within the United States
- Location: LaGrange, Georgia
- Coordinates: 33°2′29.86″N 85°2′22.37″W
- Area: 2.5 acres (1.0 ha)
- Built: 1853
- Architect: Taylor, M.
- Architectural style: Greek Revival
- Part of: Broad Street Historic District (ID84001264)
- NRHP reference No.: 72000400

Significant dates
- Added to NRHP: November 7, 1972
- Designated NHL: November 7, 1973
- Designated CP: January 12, 1984

Bellevue is a historic mansion house at 204 Ben Hill Street in LaGrange, Georgia, United States. Built in 1853–1855, it was the home of Senator Benjamin Harvey Hill, and is one of the state's finest examples of Greek Revival architecture. Now a historic house museum, it was designated a National Historic Landmark in 1973, and is a contributing structure in Broad Street Historic District.

== Description and history ==
Bellevue is located in central LaGrange, on an oval parcel located at the north end of Ben Hill Street, and flanked on both sides by McLendon Circle. It is a two-story wood-frame structure with a two-story Greek temple front, featuring six fluted Ionic columns with four-sided capitals, and a heavy multi-level entablature below a dentillated cornice. Set within the temple front is a second-floor balcony with a turned balustrade, and a center entrance recessed in an opening flanked by pilasters and topped by an entablature. Ells extend the house, joining it to what was once a separate kitchen building.

Bellevue, originally a 1,200-acre (490 ha) plantation estate, was established in 1853 by Benjamin Harvey Hill, one of Georgia's leading politicians of the antebellum and Civil War era. Its architect is only known by his last name, Taylor, and is one Georgia's finest example of antebellum Greek Revival architecture. Hill (1823–82) was a highly regarded orator and politician, who opposed secession in the years prior to the Civil War. When Georgia did secede from the Union, he served in the Senate of the Confederacy, and was opposed to Reconstruction Era legislation after the war. His house is now owned by the LaGrange Women's Club, which offers tours of the house and rentals for special events.

== See also ==
- List of National Historic Landmarks in Georgia
- National Register of Historic Places listings in Troup County, Georgia
