= Houston, Georgia =

Coordinates: 33°09′34″N 85°08′16″W

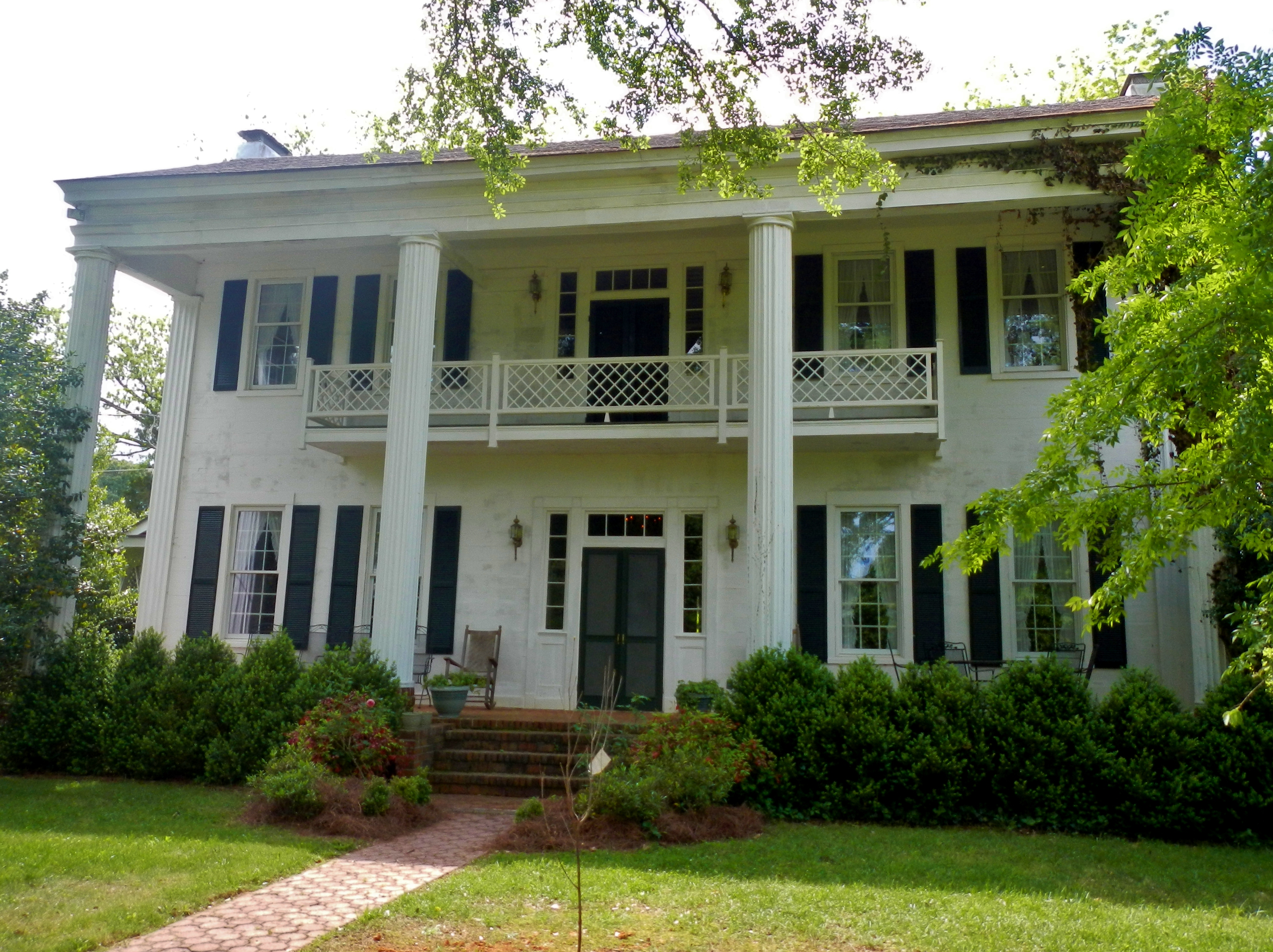
The antebellum plantation house called "Liberty Hill", built in 1836, is near the community named "Liberty Hill".

Houston (also Liberty Hill) is an unincorporated community in Heard County, Georgia, United States. Its elevation is 833 feet (254 m).

== History ==
The community was named after Reverend H. W. Houston, a local minister. The Georgia General Assembly incorporated the place in 1840 as the Village of Houston. The town's charter was dissolved in 1995.
