= Montville =

Montville may refer to:

== Places ==
=== Australia ===
- Montville, Queensland

=== France ===
- Montville, Seine-Maritime

=== United States ===
- Montville, Connecticut
- Montville, Maine
- Montville, New Jersey
- Montville Township, Geauga County, Ohio
  - Montville, Ohio
- Montville Township, Medina County, Ohio

== People ==
- Leigh Montville (born 1943), American sports reporter and author
