= Broad Street Historic District (LaGrange, Georgia) =

Historic district in Georgia, United States

- U.S. National Register of Historic Places
- U.S. Historic district
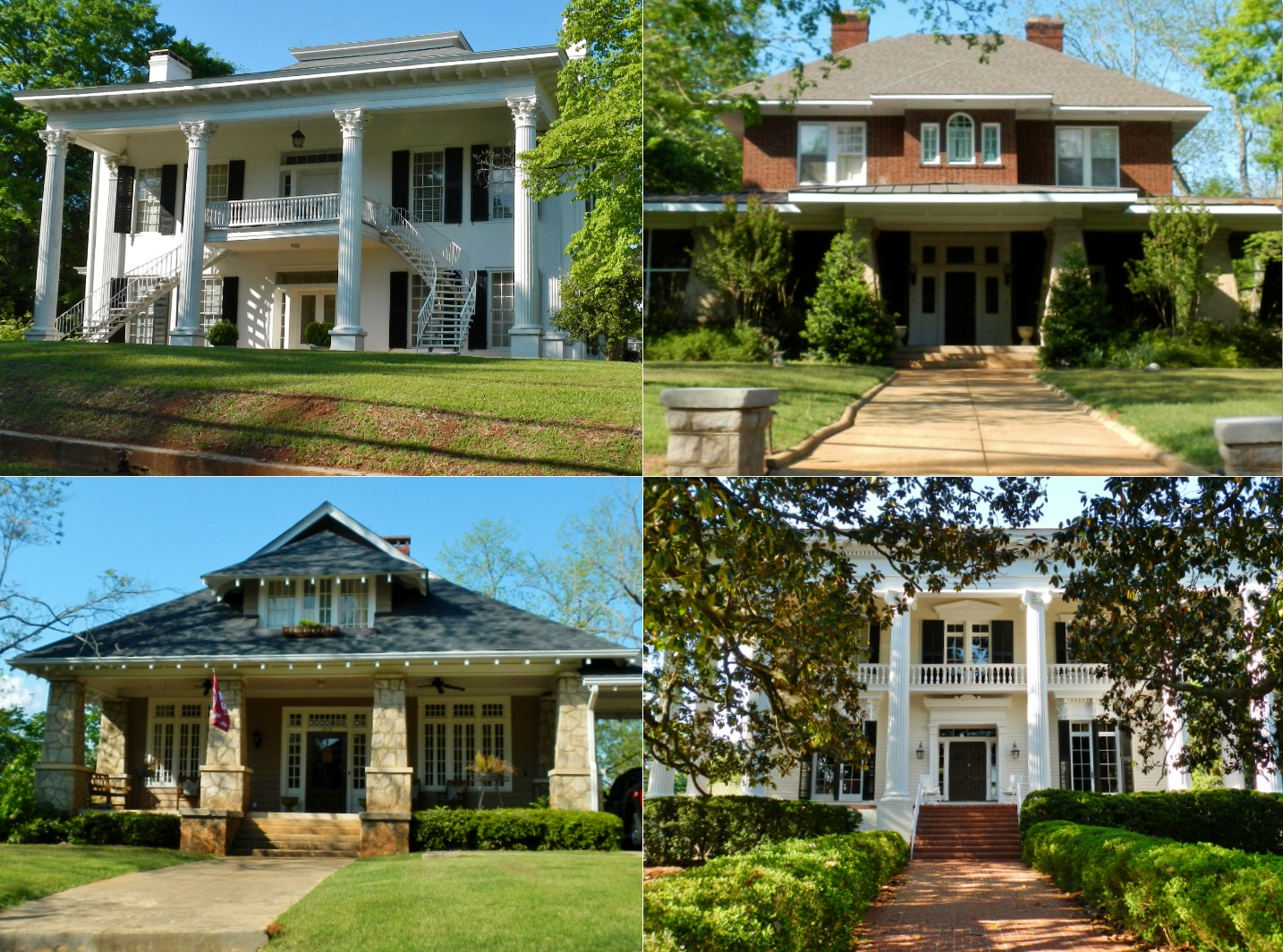

- Location within Georgia Location within the United States
- Location: La Grange, Georgia
- Coordinates: 33°02′23″N 85°02′26″W
- Architectural style: Late Victorian, Greek Revival, Tudor Revival, Craftsman/Bungalow
- NRHP reference No.: 84001264
- Added to NRHP: January 12, 1984

Broad Street Historic District in LaGrange, Georgia is a historic district. It includes the 1855-built Bellevue, an "outstanding example" of a high-style Greek Revival mansion which is a National Historic Landmark.

Post American Civil War architectural styles represented in the district include "eclectic Victorian styles", turn-of-the-20th-century Neoclassical and Georgian Revival styles and early-twentieth-century Tudor Revival and Craftsman/Bungalow styles".
