= Long Cane, Georgia =

Unincorporated community in Georgia, U.S.

Coordinates: 32°57′23″N 85°08′27″W

Long Cane is an unincorporated community in Troup County, in the U.S. state of Georgia. The name sometimes is spelled "Longcane".

== History ==
The community takes its name from nearby Long Cane Creek. A post office called Long Cane was established in 1834, and remained in operation until 1900.
