= Benjamin Harvey Hill =

American politician (1823–1882)

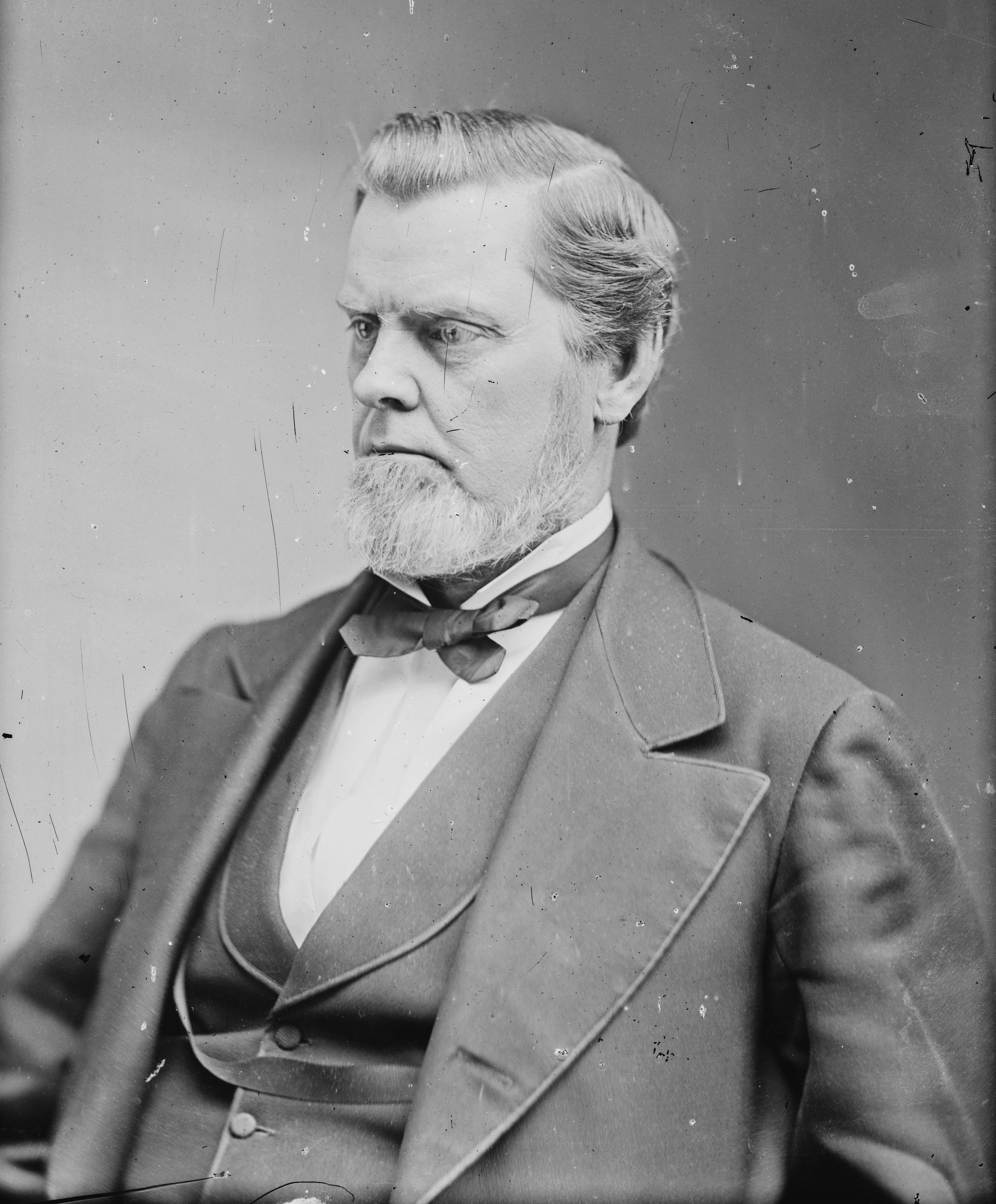

United States Senator from Georgia
- In office March 4, 1877 – August 16, 1882
- Preceded by: Thomas M. Norwood
- Succeeded by: Middleton P. Barrow

Member of the U.S. House of Representatives from Georgia's 9th district
- In office May 5, 1875 – March 3, 1877
- Preceded by: Hiram Parks Bell
- Succeeded by: Hiram Parks Bell

Confederate States Senator from Georgia
- In office February 18, 1862 – May 10, 1865
- Preceded by: Constituency established
- Succeeded by: Constituency abolished

Deputy to the C.S. Congress from Georgia
- In office February 8, 1861 – February 17, 1862
- Preceded by: Constituency established
- Succeeded by: Constituency abolished

Personal details
- Born: September 14, 1823 Jasper County, Georgia, U.S.
- Died: August 16, 1882 (aged 58) Gurley, Alabama, U.S.
- Party: Democratic
- Other political affiliations: Whig (Before 1855); American (1855–1859); Constitutional Union (1859–1861)
- Education: University of Georgia

Benjamin Harvey Hill (September 14, 1823 – August 16, 1882) was an American and Confederate politician from Georgia. His "flamboyant opposition" to Congressional Reconstruction is credited with helping inaugurate Georgia's Ku Klux Klan. His famous "brush arbor speech" in Atlanta on July 23, 1868, called for the use of violence against the governor, the legislature, and freed people. His career spanned state and national politics, and the Civil War. He served in the Georgia legislature in both houses. Although he initially opposed secession and was elected as a Unionist in 1860, he nonetheless voted to secede in that year, and represented Georgia as a Confederate senator during the conflict.

After the war and near the end of the Reconstruction era, Hill was elected in 1874 to the United States House of Representatives, and in 1877 as a U.S. senator from Georgia. He served in the Senate until his death in 1882.

== Early life ==
Hill was born September 14, 1823, in Hillsboro, Georgia, in Jasper County. He was of Welsh and Irish American ancestry. He attended the University of Georgia in Athens, Georgia, where he was a member of the Demosthenian Literary Society. He graduated in 1844 with first honors. He was admitted to the Georgia bar later in 1844. He married Caroline E. Holt in Athens, Georgia in 1845.

== Early career ==
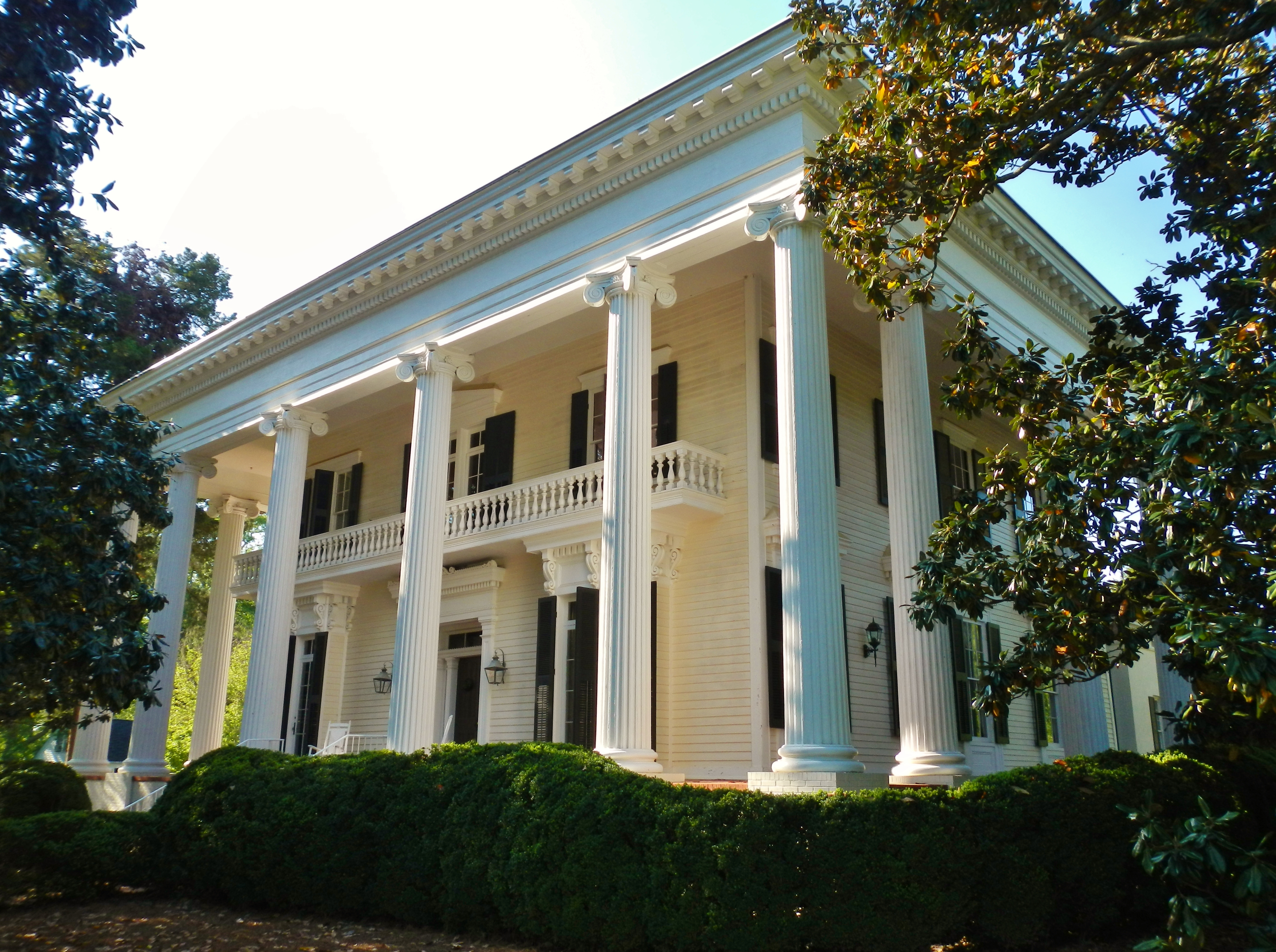
Hill's home, Bellevue

As a politician, Hill was affiliated with a number of parties, reflecting the volatile politics before and after the American Civil War. He was elected to the state legislature of Georgia in 1851 as a member of the Whig Party. He supported Millard Fillmore running on the Know-Nothing ticket in 1856, and was an elector for that party in the Electoral College. In 1857, he ran for governor of Georgia unsuccessfully against the Democratic nominee Joseph E. Brown. In 1859, he was elected to the state senate as a Unionist. In 1860, he was again an elector, this time for John Bell and the Unionist party.

Hill was known as "the peerless orator" for his skill in delivering speeches, and he was the only non-Democratic member of the Georgia secession convention on January 16, 1861. He spoke publicly against the dissolution of the Union, along with Alexander Stephens, a former opponent. Following Stephens' highly regarded argument, based on a conservative reading of the Constitution, Hill struck a more pragmatic tone.

His arguments related to the conservative belief that disunion would ultimately lead to the abolition of slavery and the downfall of Southern society. He quoted Henry Ward Beecher, a Northern abolitionist, who enthusiastically supported the dissolution of the Union as a means to end slavery, and described the anti-slavery Republican Party as a "disunionist" party, in contrast to the "Union men and Southern men" participating in the convention. Acknowledging the need to respond to the threat of Lincoln's election, Hill argued that his fellow Georgians should continue to resist Lincoln democratically within the bounds of the Constitution. He compared this course to George Washington, "so cool, so brave, and so thoughtful." He argued that the Northern states would eventually follow the British course of rising abolitionist thought, followed by acceptance again of slavery due to economic necessity. But he allowed that the South should prepare for secession and war if it should become necessary.

Hill was elected as a Unionist, but voted for secession in 1860, becoming a political ally of Confederate President Jefferson Davis. When the Confederate government was formed, Hill joined the Confederate Provisional Congress. He was subsequently elected by the Georgia legislature to the Confederate States Senate, a term which he held throughout its existence.

In 1863, a debate between Hill and Senator William Lowndes Yancey of Alabama, a Davis critic, over a bill intended to create the Confederate Supreme Court erupted into physical violence when Hill struck Yancey in the head with a glass inkstand, knocking Yancey over a desk and onto the floor of the Senate. The attack was kept secret for months, and in the ensuing investigation it was Yancey, not Hill, who was censured. Yancey left Congress before adjournment to recover from the injury, and his health deteriorated rapidly over the next months before he died on July 27, 1863, of kidney disease.

At the end of the Civil War, Hill was arrested as a Confederate official by the Union and confined in Fort Lafayette from May until July 1865.

== Later career ==
In 1867, Hill wrote a series of attacks on Reconstruction in the Augusta Chronicle that he called "Notes on the Situation" that his son Ben Hill Jr. later noted were filled with "severe and bitter invective" against Congressional Reconstruction and the presence of Black voters in particular. On July 31, 1871, after Black legislators were ejected from the Georgia House of Delegates, the Klan had frightened away most Black voters in Georgia, and Georgia was readmitted to the Union, Hill became a spokesman for what he called a "New South." In 1874, Hill was elected to the U. S. House of Representatives, serving from May 5, 1875 - March 3, 1877. He was later elected by the Georgia legislature to the U.S. Senate on January 26, 1877. He served in the U.S. Senate from March 4, 1877, until his death on August 16, 1882. His obituary was featured on the front page of the Atlanta Constitution on August 17, 1882.

== Death ==
Hill is buried in historic Oakland Cemetery in Atlanta, Georgia.

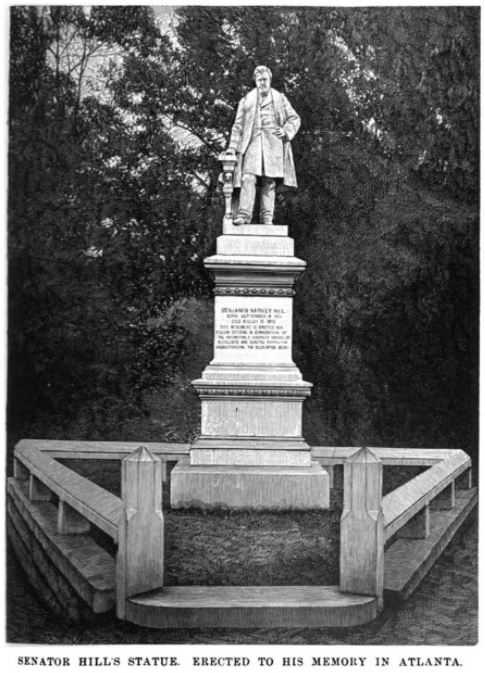
Statue of Benjamin Harvey Hill, now located inside the Georgia State Capitol

== Legacy and honors ==
- A life-size statue of Benjamin Harvey Hill looking down from atop a similarly sized plinth was installed inside the Georgia State Capitol in Atlanta, Georgia.
- A larger than life portrait of Hill hangs in the Capitol Rotunda.
- Ben Hill County, Georgia, founded in 1906, was named in his honor.

== See also ==
- List of signers of the Georgia Ordinance of Secession
- List of members of the United States Congress who died in office (1790–1899)

Party political offices
Preceded by Garnett Andrews	Know Nothing nominee for Governor of Georgia; 1857	Succeeded by None
Political offices
Preceded by Constituency established	Deputy in the C.S. Congress from Georgia; February 8, 1861 – February 17, 1862	Succeeded by Constituency abolished
Confederate States Senate
Preceded by Constituency established	Confederate States Senator (Class 3) from Georgia; February 18, 1862 – May 10, 1865; Served alongside: John Wood Lewis, Sr., Herschel Vespasian Johnson	Succeeded by Constituency abolished
U.S. House of Representatives
Preceded by Hiram Parks Bell	Member of the U.S. House of Representatives from Georgia's 9th congressional district 1875–1877	Succeeded by Hiram Parks Bell
U.S. Senate
Preceded by Thomas M. Norwood	United States Senator (Class 2) from Georgia; 1877–1882; Served alongside: John Gordon, Joseph E. Brown	Succeeded by Middleton P. Barrow
