= Mountville, Georgia =

Unincorporated community in Georgia, U.S.

Coordinates: 33°02′21″N 84°52′51″W

Mountville is an unincorporated community in Troup County, in the U.S. state of Georgia. The community was struck by an EF2 tornado (albeit at EF1 strength) on January 12, 2023. The tornado injured four people along its path as well.

== History ==
The community was so named on account of its lofty elevation. A post office called Mountville was established in 1835.

The Georgia General Assembly incorporated Mountville as a town in 1897. The town's municipal charter was repealed in 1995.
