= Troup County, Georgia =

County in Georgia, United States

- County
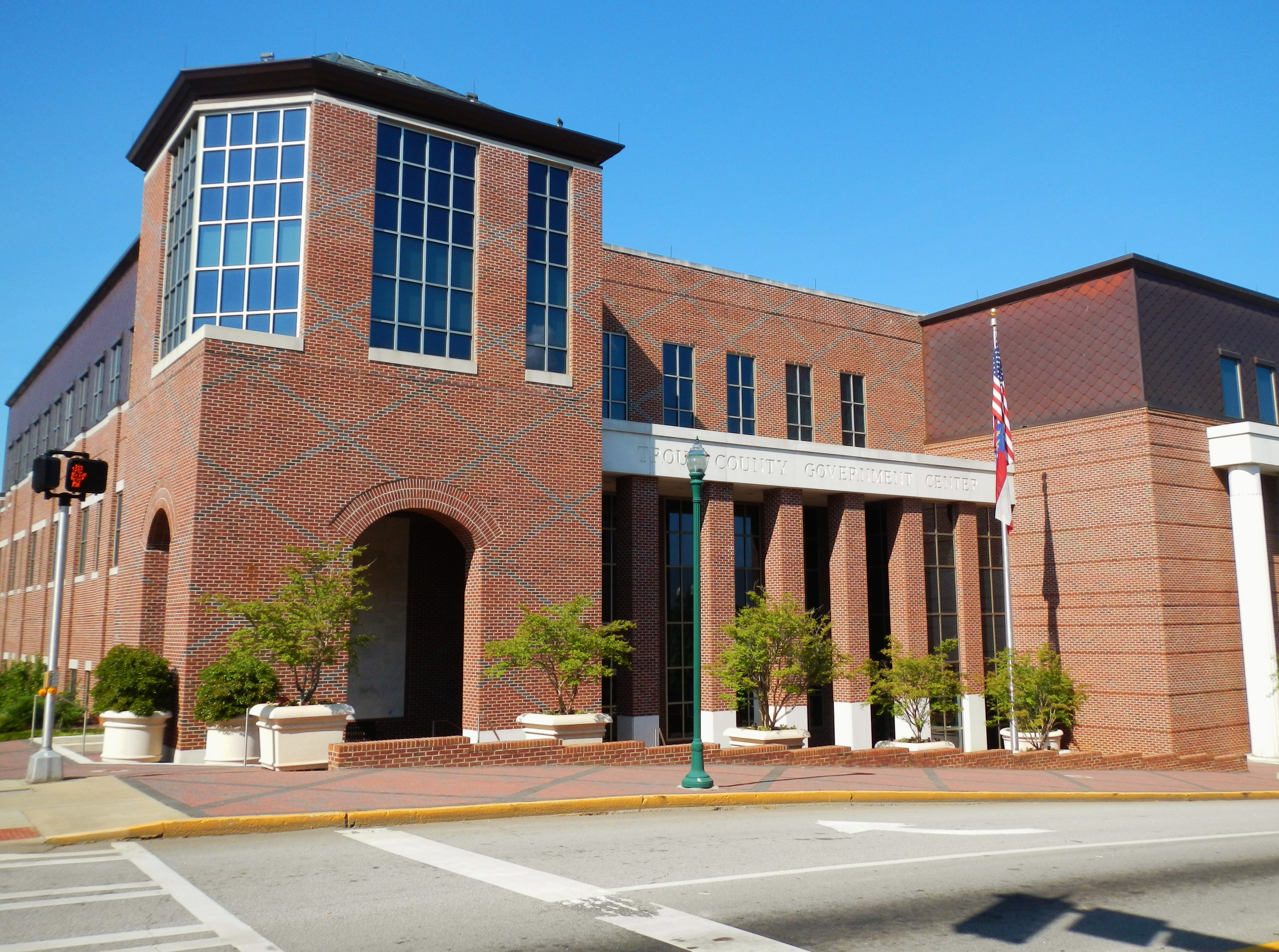
- Troup County Courthouse and Government Center in LaGrange, April 2012.

- Seal Logo

- Location within the U.S. state of Georgia
- Coordinates: 33°02′N 85°02′W
- Country: United States
- State: Georgia
- Founded: June 9, 1826; 200 years ago
- Named for: George Troup
- Seat: LaGrange
- Largest city: LaGrange

Area
  - Total: 446 sq mi (1,160 km^{2})
  - Land: 414 sq mi (1,070 km^{2})
  - Water: 32 sq mi (83 km^{2}) 7.2%

Population (2020)
  - Total: 69,426
  - Estimate (2025): 72,844 ▲
  - Density: 168/sq mi (64.7/km^{2})
- Time zone: UTC−5 (Eastern)
  - Summer (DST): UTC−4 (EDT)
- Congressional district: 3rd
- Website: https://www.troupcountyga.gov/

Troup County (/truːp/, TROOP) is a county in the West Central region of the U.S. state of Georgia. As of the 2020 census, the population was 69,426. The county seat is LaGrange. Troup County comprises the LaGrange micropolitan statistical area along with Chambers County, AL. It is included in the Atlanta-Athens-Clarke County-Sandy Springs combined statistical area.

== History ==
For thousands of years, this area of what is now defined as west central Georgia was occupied by cultures of indigenous peoples. In the historic period, it was part of a large area controlled by the Muscogee, also known as the Creek people.

The land for Lee, Muscogee, Troup, Coweta, and Carroll counties was ceded by the Creek to the United States in the 1825 Treaty of Indian Springs. The counties' boundaries were created by the Georgia General Assembly on June 9, 1826, but the counties themselves were not named until December 14, 1826.

The county is named for George Troup, thirty-fourth governor of Georgia, U.S. representative, and senator.

As with much of the Piedmont, this area was developed in the antebellum era for cotton cultivation after short-staple cotton was made profitable by invention of the cotton gin. By 1860 Troup County was the fourth-wealthiest in Georgia and fifth-largest slaveholding county in the state.

According to U.S. Census data, the 1860 Troup County population included 6,223 whites, 37 "free colored" and 10,002 slaves. By the 1870 census, the white population had increased about 3% to 6,408, while the "colored" population had increased about 12% to 11,224.

During the post-Reconstruction period, violence and the number of lynchings of blacks increased in the late 19th century, as whites exercised terrorism to re-establish and maintain white supremacy. Whites lynched three African Americans in Troup County in this period, most were killed around the turn of the 20th century. Such deaths occurred through the post-World War II period. A fourth man from Troup County was lynched in neighboring Harris County.

In the late 19th century, entrepreneurs in LaGrange built the first cotton mill, and others were rapidly established in this area. Initially they employed only white workers.

=== 20th century to present ===
During the first half of the 20th century, thousands of blacks left Georgia and other southern states in what is known as the Great Migration. They were seeking work as mechanization reduced the number of farm jobs, and they were seeking more opportunities than in the Jim Crow South, where they were disenfranchised and socially oppressed.

On September 8, 1940, 16-year-old Austin Callaway, a black youth, was arrested in LaGrange as a suspect in an attack on a white woman. The next night a small, armed group of white men took him from the county jail, driving him out to the nearby countryside, where they lynched him: shooting him several times and leaving him for dead. In 2017 a man who was a child at the time revealed that his white family found and took Callaway to the hospital, where he died the next day. They had kept their role secret out of fear of the KKK. Callaway was noted by the local paper as dying from gunshot wounds; the New York Times at the time described it as a lynching. As was typical in these cases, no one was prosecuted for the murder. In response, that fall African Americans organized the first NAACP chapter in Troup County at Warren Temple Methodist Church in LaGrange. It has worked on a variety of civil rights issues, including voting rights, equal justice, access, and human services.

In 1947, prosperous farmer Henry "Peg" Gilbert, a married African-American father who owned and farmed 100 acres in the county, was arrested and charged with harboring a fugitive by officials from neighboring Harris County, Georgia, in the case of Gus Davidson. Also African American, the latter man was charged in the shooting death of a white farmer. Four days later Gilbert was dead, shot while held in jail by the Harris County Sheriff, in what he said was self-defense. In 2016 the Civil Rights and Restorative Justice Project of Northeastern University reported on this death in custody. They found that Gilbert had been beaten severely before his death, and shot five times. They asserted he had been detained and killed because of his success as a farmer.

By 1960, the county was recorded in the US Census as having 31,418 whites and 15,760 "Negroes" (now classified as black or African Americans). Following passage of the Voting Rights Act of 1965, blacks gradually regained the ability to vote and take part in the political process.

Textile manufacturing was a major part of the economy until the late 20th century, when textile manufacturing moved offshore to areas with cheaper labor. The county has acquired other industry, notably auto parts manufacturers who support the nearby Kia Motors plant. Also in the area are West Point Lake and Callaway Gardens, which attract tourists and visitors as top recreation destinations in the state.

On January 25, 2017, Mayor Jim Thornton and Police Chief Louis M. Dekmar, of the county seat of LaGrange, publicly apologized to more than 200 people gathered for a reconciliation service at Warren Temple United Methodist Church for the police's failure decades before to protect Callaway, saying:

"I sincerely regret and denounce the role our Police Department played in Austin's lynching, both through our action and our inaction," Chief Dekmar told a crowd at a traditionally African-American church. "And for that, I'm profoundly sorry. It should never have happened."

Residents organized Troup Together, a grassroots group to acknowledge lynchings, commemorate the victims, and work on racial reconciliation. On March 18, 2017, black and white residents of the county gathered to dedicate a historic marker at Warren Temple Church "memorializing Callaway's lynching and three others documented in the area: Willis Hodnett in 1884; Samuel Owensby in 1913 and Henry Gilbert, a Troup County resident who was lynched in neighboring Harris County in 1947." Another ceremony was held at Southview Cemetery in LaGrange, where these names were read.

On April 7, 2017, Troup County's computer systems were the victim of a ransomware attack; it caused all county computer systems to be inaccessible. This included the sheriff's office and district attorney's office. After five days, the county was still working to get 400 computer systems back online.

== Geography ==
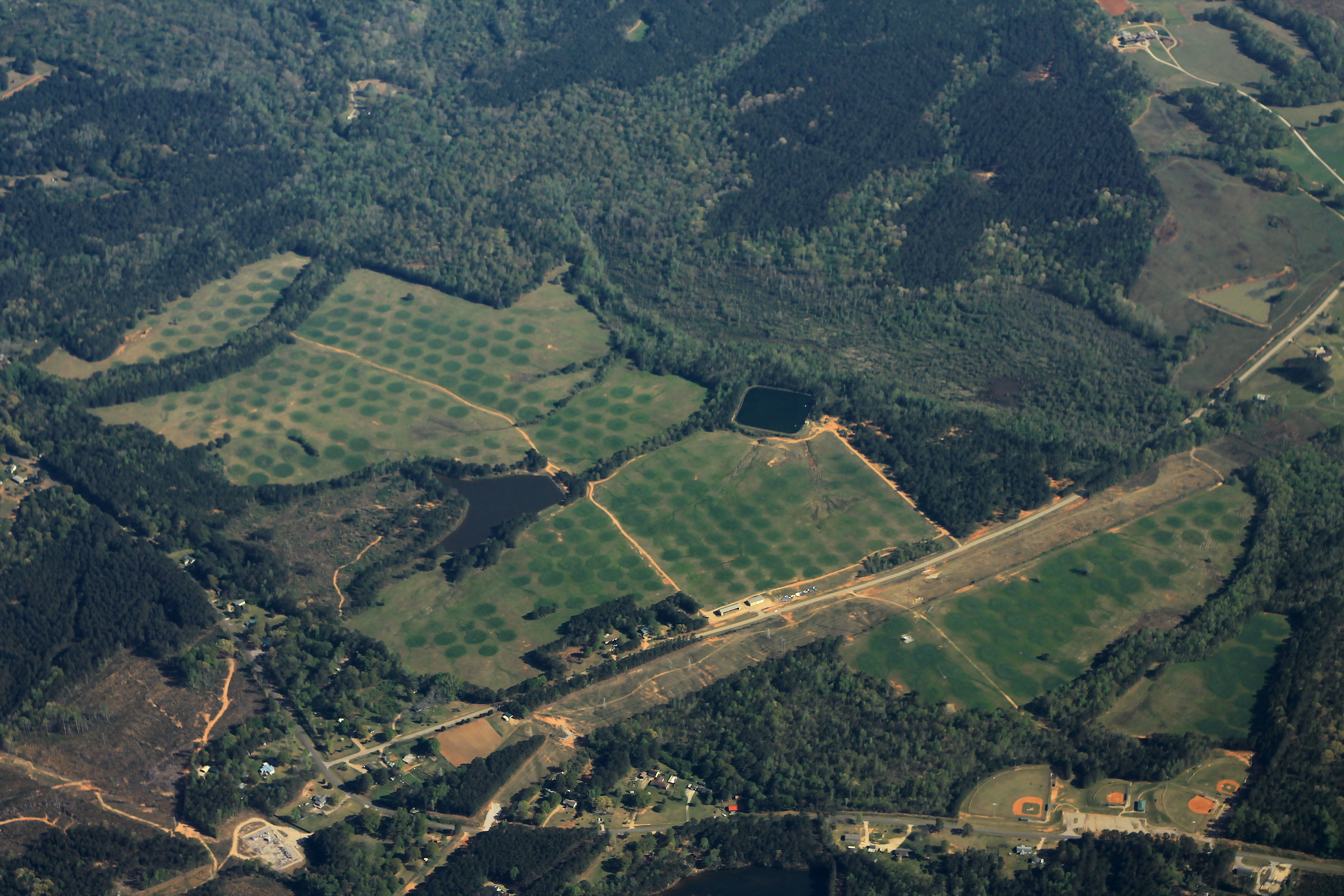
Landscape of Troup County, near Hogansville

According to the U.S. Census Bureau, the county has a total area of 446 square miles (1,160 km^{2}), of which 414 square miles (1,070 km^{2}) is land and 32 square miles (83 km^{2}) (7.2%) is water. The county is located in the Piedmont region of the state.

The entirety of Troup County is located in the Middle Chattahoochee River-Lake Harding sub-basin of the ACF River Basin (Apalachicola-Chattahoochee-Flint River Basin).

=== Major highways ===
- Interstate 85 / State Route 403 (unsigned)
- Interstate 185 / State Route 411 (unsigned)
- U.S. Route 27 / State Route 1
- U.S. Route 29 / State Route 14
  - State Route 14 Connector
  - State Route 14 Spur
- State Route 18
- State Route 54
- State Route 100
- State Route 103
- State Route 109
- State Route 219

=== Adjacent counties ===
- Coweta County (northeast)
- Meriwether County (east)
- Harris County (south)
- Chambers County, Alabama (southwest/CST Border except for Lanett and Valley as they are part of the Columbus Metropolitan Area)
- Randolph County, Alabama (northwest/CST Border)
- Heard County (north)

== Communities ==
=== Cities ===
- Hogansville
- LaGrange (county seat)
- West Point

=== Unincorporated communities ===
- Abbottsford
- Harrisonville
- Long Cane
- Mountville

== Demographics ==
Historical population
Census	Pop.	Note	%±
1830	5,799		—
1840	15,733		171.3%
1850	16,879		7.3%
1860	16,262		−3.7%
1870	17,632		8.4%
1880	20,565		16.6%
1890	20,723		0.8%
1900	24,002		15.8%
1910	26,228		9.3%
1920	36,097		37.6%
1930	36,752		1.8%
1940	43,879		19.4%
1950	49,841		13.6%
1960	47,189		−5.3%
1970	44,466		−5.8%
1980	50,003		12.5%
1990	55,536		11.1%
2000	58,779		5.8%
2010	67,044		14.1%
2020	69,426		3.6%
2025 (est.)	72,844	▲	4.9%
U.S. Decennial Census; 1790-1880 1890-1910; 1920-1930 1930-1940; 1940-1950 1960-1980; 1980-2000 2010

=== Racial and ethnic composition ===
Troup County, Georgia – Racial and ethnic composition Note: the US Census treats Hispanic/Latino as an ethnic category. This table excludes Latinos from the racial categories and assigns them to a separate category. Hispanics/Latinos may be of any race.
Race / Ethnicity (NH = Non-Hispanic)	Pop 1980	Pop 1990	Pop 2000	Pop 2010	Pop 2020	% 1980	% 1990	% 2000	% 2010	% 2020
White alone (NH)	33,975	38,284	38,261	40,408	38,099	67.95%	68.94%	65.09%	60.27%	54.88%
Black or African American alone (NH)	15,449	16,614	18,650	22,319	24,157	30.90%	29.92%	31.73%	33.29%	34.80%
Native American or Alaska Native alone (NH)	24	53	84	134	127	0.05%	0.10%	0.14%	0.20%	0.18%
Asian alone (NH)	130	286	340	1,054	1,608	0.26%	0.51%	0.58%	1.57%	2.32%
Native Hawaiian or Pacific Islander alone (NH)	x	x	10	21	36	x	x	0.02%	0.03%	0.05%
Other race alone (NH)	13	10	55	85	239	0.03%	0.02%	0.09%	0.13%	0.34%
Mixed race or Multiracial (NH)	x	x	375	853	2,204	x	x	0.64%	1.27%	3.17%
Hispanic or Latino (any race)	412	289	1,004	2,170	2,956	0.82%	0.52%	1.71%	3.24%	4.26%
Total	50,003	55,536	58,779	67,044	69,426	100.00%	100.00%	100.00%	100.00%	100.00%

=== 2020 census ===
As of the 2020 census, the county had 69,426 people, 26,317 households, and 15,354 families residing in the county. The median age was 38.1 years. 24.3% of residents were under the age of 18 and 16.4% of residents were 65 years of age or older. For every 100 females there were 91.7 males, and for every 100 females age 18 and over there were 87.5 males age 18 and over. 54.6% of residents lived in urban areas, while 45.4% lived in rural areas.

The racial makeup of the county was 55.7% White, 35.0% Black or African American, 0.3% American Indian and Alaska Native, 2.3% Asian, 0.1% Native Hawaiian and Pacific Islander, 2.5% from some other race, and 4.2% from two or more races. Hispanic or Latino residents of any race comprised 4.3% of the population.

Of those households, 33.6% had children under the age of 18 living with them and 33.4% had a female householder with no spouse or partner present. About 26.3% of all households were made up of individuals and 11.3% had someone living alone who was 65 years of age or older.

There were 28,721 housing units, of which 8.4% were vacant. Among occupied housing units, 59.1% were owner-occupied and 40.9% were renter-occupied. The homeowner vacancy rate was 1.7% and the rental vacancy rate was 6.1%.

== Government ==
The government of Troup County is based on an elected county commission, or council. The chairman is elected county-wide, or at-large, and four commissioners are each elected from single-member districts. District 5 includes much of the territory of LaGrange, the county seat and most densely settled community in the county.

=== Politics ===
United States presidential election results for Troup County, Georgia
Year	Republican		Democratic		Third party(ies)	
Year	No.	%	No.	%	No.	%
1912	25	1.63%	1,434	93.30%	78	5.07%
1916	38	2.52%	1,227	81.53%	240	15.95%
1920	342	19.07%	1,451	80.93%	0	0.00%
1924	165	9.80%	1,422	84.44%	97	5.76%
1928	967	38.31%	1,557	61.69%	0	0.00%
1932	81	3.30%	2,371	96.62%	2	0.08%
1936	167	5.76%	2,728	94.13%	3	0.10%
1940	288	8.28%	3,176	91.34%	13	0.37%
1944	342	9.57%	3,233	90.43%	0	0.00%
1948	536	10.37%	3,896	75.37%	737	14.26%
1952	1,887	20.93%	7,130	79.07%	0	0.00%
1956	2,214	26.43%	6,162	73.57%	0	0.00%
1960	2,808	32.83%	5,745	67.17%	0	0.00%
1964	5,277	46.66%	6,032	53.34%	0	0.00%
1968	3,239	26.19%	2,896	23.42%	6,232	50.39%
1972	8,350	80.24%	2,056	19.76%	0	0.00%
1976	4,422	36.48%	7,699	63.52%	0	0.00%
1980	5,398	40.20%	7,716	57.46%	315	2.35%
1984	9,340	63.92%	5,272	36.08%	0	0.00%
1988	9,484	67.31%	4,562	32.38%	43	0.31%
1992	8,118	47.64%	6,412	37.63%	2,509	14.73%
1996	8,716	55.06%	5,940	37.52%	1,175	7.42%
2000	11,198	62.90%	6,379	35.83%	227	1.27%
2004	14,183	64.65%	7,630	34.78%	126	0.57%
2008	15,391	59.04%	10,455	40.11%	222	0.85%
2012	15,179	58.30%	10,547	40.51%	309	1.19%
2016	15,750	60.32%	9,713	37.20%	648	2.48%
2020	18,142	60.36%	11,577	38.52%	338	1.12%
2024	19,392	61.95%	11,757	37.56%	155	0.50%

United States Senate election results for Troup County, Georgia2
Year	Republican		Democratic		Third party(ies)	
Year	No.	%	No.	%	No.	%
2020	18,162	60.93%	11,111	37.27%	536	1.80%
2020	15,788	60.05%	10,504	39.95%	0	0.00%

United States Senate election results for Troup County, Georgia3
Year	Republican		Democratic		Third party(ies)	
Year	No.	%	No.	%	No.	%
2020	9,163	31.02%	7,472	25.30%	12,903	43.68%
2020	18,143	61.04%	11,578	38.96%	0	0.00%
2022	13,937	60.15%	8,806	38.01%	426	1.84%
2022	12,757	60.47%	8,339	39.53%	0	0.00%

Georgia Gubernatorial election results for Troup County
Year	Republican		Democratic		Third party(ies)	
Year	No.	%	No.	%	No.	%
2022	14,864	63.91%	8,262	35.53%	130	0.56%

As of the 2020s, Troup County is a strongly Republican voting county, voting 62% for Donald Trump in 2024. For elections to the United States House of Representatives, Troup County is part of Georgia's 3rd congressional district, currently represented by Brian Jack. For elections to the Georgia State Senate, Troup County is part of District 29. For elections to the Georgia House of Representatives, Troup County is part of districts 136 and 137.

== Education ==
Public education is provided by the Troup County School District.

== See also ==
- National Register of Historic Places listings in Troup County, Georgia
- The Burnt Village
- List of counties in Georgia
