= Heard County School District =

School district in Georgia (U.S. state)

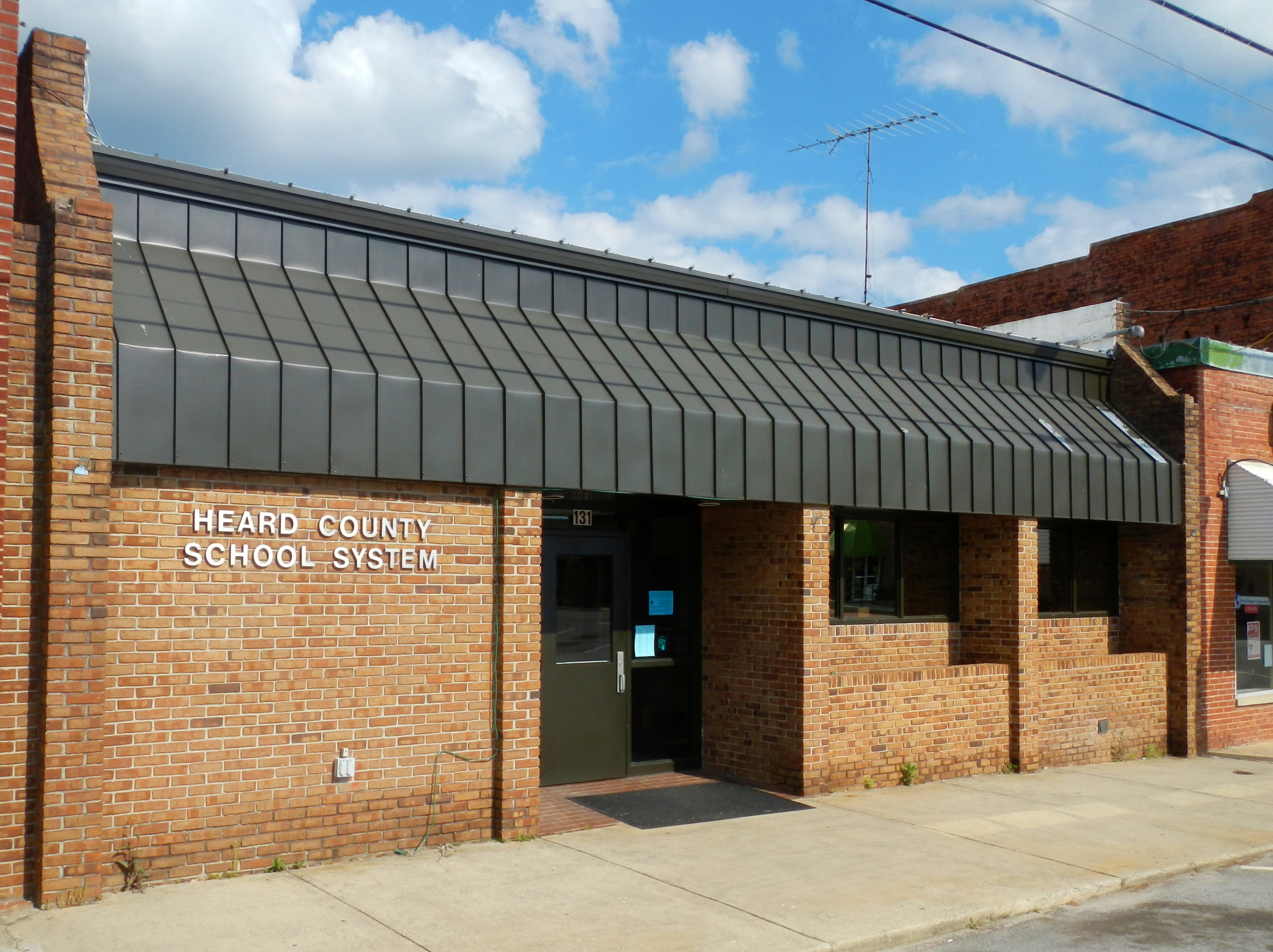

Address
- 131 Court Square Franklin, Georgia, 30217; United States
- Coordinates: 33.20652°N 84.04541°W

District information
- Grades: Pre-school - 12
- Superintendent: Benjamin R. Hyatt
- Accreditation(s): Southern Association of Colleges and Schools; Georgia Accrediting Commission

Students and staff
- Students: 2,178
- Teachers: 132

Other information
- Telephone: (706) 675-3320
- Fax: (706) 675-3357
- Website: http://www.heard.k12.ga.us/

The Heard County School District is a public school district in Heard County, Georgia, United States, based in Franklin. It serves the communities of Centralhatchee, Corinth, Ephesus, Franklin, Glenn, and Houston.

== Schools ==
The Heard County School District has three elementary schools, one middle school, and one high school.

=== Elementary schools ===
- Centralhatchee Elementary School
- Ephesus Elementary School
- Heard Elementary School

=== Middle school ===
- Heard County Middle School

=== High school ===
- Heard County High School
