= Emory Jones =

American football player (born 2000)

Dallas Renegades
- Position: Quarterback
- Roster status: Active

Personal information
- Born: April 29, 2000 (age 26); LaGrange, Georgia
- Listed height: 6 ft 2 in (1.88 m)
- Listed weight: 211 lb (96 kg)

Career information
- High school: Heard County (Franklin, Georgia)
- College: Florida (2018–2021); Arizona State (2022); Cincinnati (2023)
- NFL draft: 2024: undrafted

Career history
- Baltimore Ravens (2024)*; Atlanta Falcons (2024–2025)*; Dallas Renegades (2027–present)
- * Offseason or practice squad member only
- Stats at Pro Football Reference

Emory Jones (born April 29, 2000) is an American professional football quarterback for the Dallas Renegades of the United Football League (UFL). He played college football for the Florida Gators, the Arizona State Sun Devils and the Cincinnati Bearcats.

== Early life ==
Jones grew up in LaGrange, Georgia, and attended Heard County High School. As a senior, he completed 61 of 103 passes for 1,197 yards and 10 touchdowns while also rushing for 494 yards and six touchdowns.

Jones was rated a four star recruit and initially committed to play college football at Ohio State over offers from Clemson and Tennessee. He decommitted from Ohio State and instead signed to play at the University of Florida.

College recruiting
Name	Hometown	School	Height	Weight	Commit date
Emory Jones; QB	Franklin, GA	Heard County (GA)	6 ft 2.5 in (1.89 m)	195 lb (88 kg)	Dec 20, 2017
Emory Jones; QB	Recruit ratings: Rivals: 247Sports: ESPN: (85)				

== College career ==
=== Florida ===
Jones played in four games before redshirting his true freshman season, completing 12 of 16 pass attempts for 125 yards and two touchdowns. As a redshirt freshman, he completed 25 of 38 pass attempts for 267 yards and three touchdowns and also rushed 42 times for 256 yards and four touchdowns. He continued to be used in package plays while also serving as the backup to starter Kyle Trask.

Jones was the Gators' starting quarterback to start their 2021 season. On March 18, 2022, Jones confirmed to his coaches that he would be entering the transfer portal.

=== Arizona State ===
On May 5, 2022, Jones transferred to Arizona State. He was the Sun Devils' starting quarterback for the first seven games of the 2022 season before being replaced by Trenton Bourguet.

=== Cincinnati ===
On December 12, 2022, Jones entered the transfer portal again. Nine days later he committed to Cincinnati under new Head Coach Scott Satterfield.

Jones threw five touchdown passes in his first appearance for the Bearcats, leading Cincinnati to a victory over Eastern Kentucky. He started twelve games during the 2023 season, throwing for 2,219 yards and 18 touchdowns.

=== Statistics ===
Season	Team	Games			Passing								Rushing			
Season	Team	GP	GS	Record	Cmp	Att	Pct	Yds	Avg	TD	Int	Rtg	Att	Yds	Avg	TD
2018	Florida	4	0	—	12	16	75.0	125	10.3	2	0	181.9	18	41	2.3	0
2019	Florida	11	0	—	25	38	65.8	267	8.6	3	0	150.9	42	256	6.1	4
2020	Florida	9	0	—	18	32	56.3	221	6.8	2	1	128.6	32	217	6.8	2
2021	Florida	13	12	6–6	224	346	64.7	2,734	7.9	19	13	141.7	143	759	5.3	4
2022	Arizona State	8	7	1–6	125	199	62.8	1,533	7.7	7	4	135.1	59	31	0.5	4
2023	Cincinnati	12	11	3–8	197	322	61.2	2,219	6.9	18	10	131.3	155	560	3.6	4
Career		57	30	10–20	601	953	63.1	7,099	7.4	51	28	137.4	449	1,863	4.1	18

== Professional career ==
Pre-draft measurables
Height	Weight	Arm length	Hand span	40-yard dash	10-yard split	20-yard split	20-yard shuttle	Three-cone drill	Vertical jump
6 ft 2 1/4 in (1.89 m)	203 lb (92 kg)	32 3/8 in (0.82 m)	9 3/8 in (0.24 m)	4.77 s	1.64 s	2.75 s	4.55 s	7.28 s	30.0 in (0.76 m)
All values from Pro Day

=== Baltimore Ravens ===
On May 6, 2024, Jones signed with the Baltimore Ravens as an undrafted free agent. He was released by the Ravens on August 27.

=== DC Defenders ===
On November 13, 2024, Jones signed with the DC Defenders of the United Football League (UFL).

=== Atlanta Falcons ===
On December 26, 2024, Jones was signed to the Atlanta Falcons' practice squad. He signed a reserve/future contract with Atlanta on January 6, 2025. Jones was released by the Falcons on August 18 after suffering a concussion in a preseason game and reverted to injured reserve the following day. He was released on February 17, 2026.

=== Dallas Renegades ===
On November 3, 2026, Jones was traded to the Dallas Renegades of the United Football League (UFL) in exchange for Kary Vincent Jr. Despite not playing in 2026, Jones' rights were held by the Louisville Kings.
