= Alijah Huzzie =

American football player (born 2001)

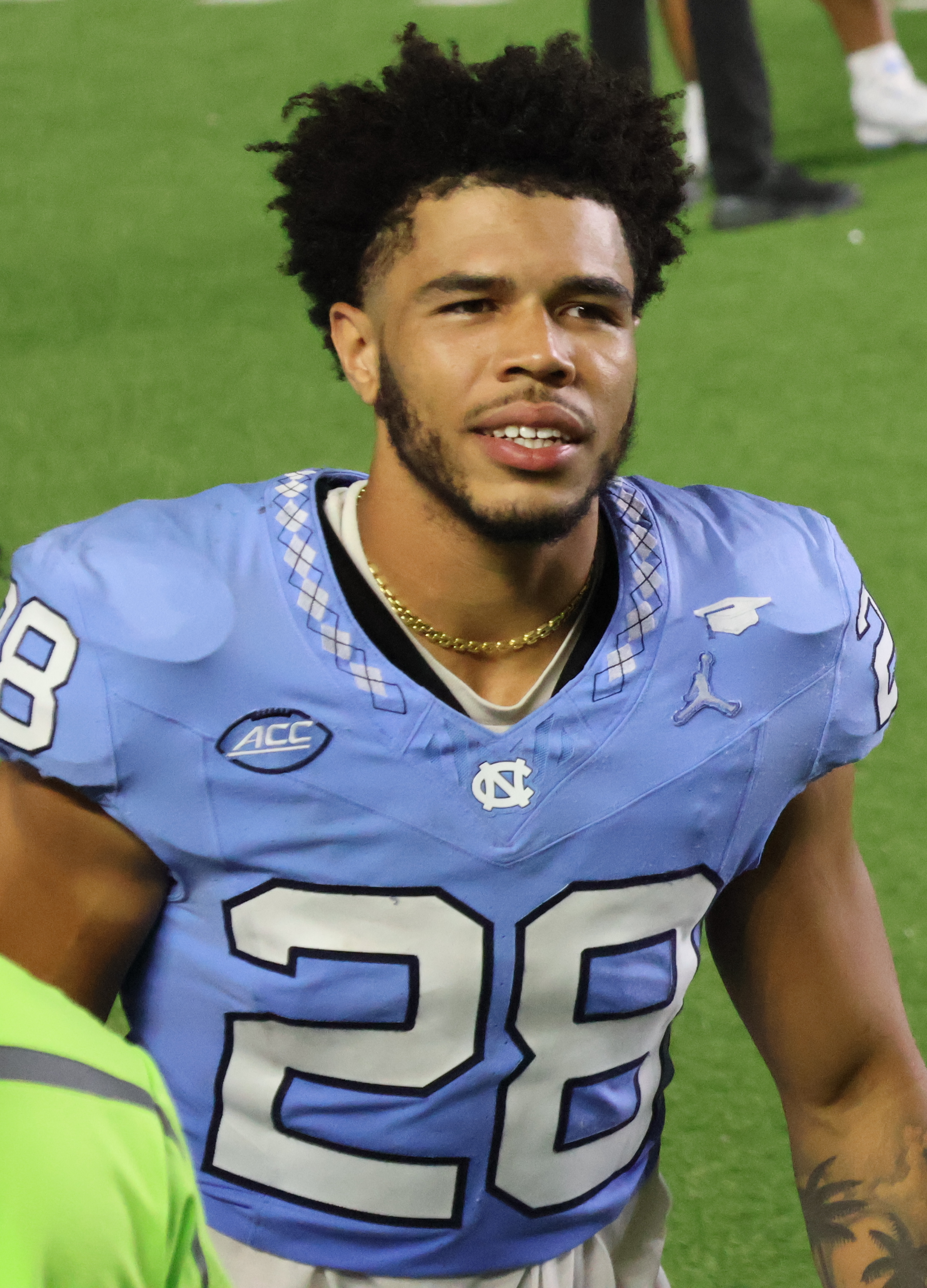
- Huzzie with North Carolina in 2024

No. 21 – Jacksonville Jaguars
- Position: Cornerback
- Roster status: Practice squad

Personal information
- Born: January 16, 2001 (age 25); LaGrange, Georgia, U.S.
- Listed height: 5 ft 10 in (1.78 m)
- Listed weight: 195 lb (88 kg)

Career information
- High school: Heard County (Franklin, Georgia)
- College: East Tennessee State (2019–2022); North Carolina (2023–2024)
- NFL draft: 2025: undrafted

Career history
- Houston Texans (2025–2026); Jacksonville Jaguars (2026–present)

Career NFL statistics as of 2025
- Tackles: 3
- Pass deflections: 1
- Interceptions: 1
- Stats at Pro Football Reference

Alijah Huzzie (born January 16, 2001) is an American professional football cornerback for the Jacksonville Jaguars of the National Football League (NFL). He played college football for the East Tennessee State Buccaneers and North Carolina Tar Heels.

== Early life ==
Huzzie attended Heard County High School in Franklin, Georgia. He committed to play college football for the East Tennessee State Buccaneers.

== College career ==
=== East Tennessee State ===
Huzzie had a breakout 2022 season with East Tennessee State, notching 59 tackles, 2.5 tackles for loss, six interceptions, 22 passes deflections, and a touchdown. For his performance, he was named a first-team FCS All-American. After the conclusion of the 2022 season, Huzzie entered the NCAA transfer portal.

Huzzie finished his career at East Tennessee State with 179 tackles, 30 pass deflections, and 12 interceptions, over a span of 34 games.

=== North Carolina ===
Huzzie transferred to North Carolina Tar Heels to continue his career. In week four of the 2023 season, Huzzie had a breakout game, where he notched two interceptions, and he returned two punts for 82 yards and a touchdown, as he helped the Tar Heels beat Pittsburgh. For his performance on the game, Huzzie was named the Atlantic Coast Conference (ACC) special teams player of the week.

== Professional career ==
Pre-draft measurables
Height	Weight	Arm length	Hand span	Wingspan
5 ft 9 3/4 in (1.77 m)	193 lb (88 kg)	29 5/8 in (0.75 m)	8 5/8 in (0.22 m)	6 ft 0 5/8 in (1.84 m)
All values from NFL Combine

=== Houston Texans ===
Huzzie was signed by the Houston Texans as an undrafted free agent on May 9, 2025. After starting the season on the reserve/non-football injury list, he was activated on November 5, but released the next day and re-signed to the practice squad. On December 6, Huzzie was activated to the active roster for standard elevation. Huzzie was activated to the active roster for standard elevation again on December 20. Huzzie made his NFL debut the following day against the Las Vegas Raiders. On January 4, 2026, Huzzie recorded his first career interception on a deflection pass against the Indianapolis Colts in Week 18.

On August 30, 2026, Huzzie was waived by the Texans as a part of final roster cuts; he was re-signed to the team's practice squad the next day.

=== Jacksonville Jaguars ===
On October 6, 2026, Huzzie was signed by the Jacksonville Jaguars off the Texans practice squad. On November 10, he was waived and re-signed to the practice squad two days later.
