= National Register of Historic Places listings in Heard County, Georgia =

This is a list of properties and districts in Heard County, Georgia that are listed on the National Register of Historic Places (NRHP).

This National Park Service list is complete through NPS recent listings posted March 14, 2025.

== Current listings ==
	Name on the Register	Image	Date listed	Location	City or town	Description
1	Heard County Jail	Heard County Jail	January 27, 1981 (#81000199)	Court Sq. and Shady Lane; 33°16′48″N 85°05′57″W	Franklin	Built in 1912, the Heard County Jail now serves as a museum and historical center.
2	John M. Ware Sr. House		November 3, 1980 (#80001090)	Address Restricted	Corinth	This clapboard house was built in 1838 and burned in the spring of 1983.
