= Skyler Thomas =

American football player (born 2003)

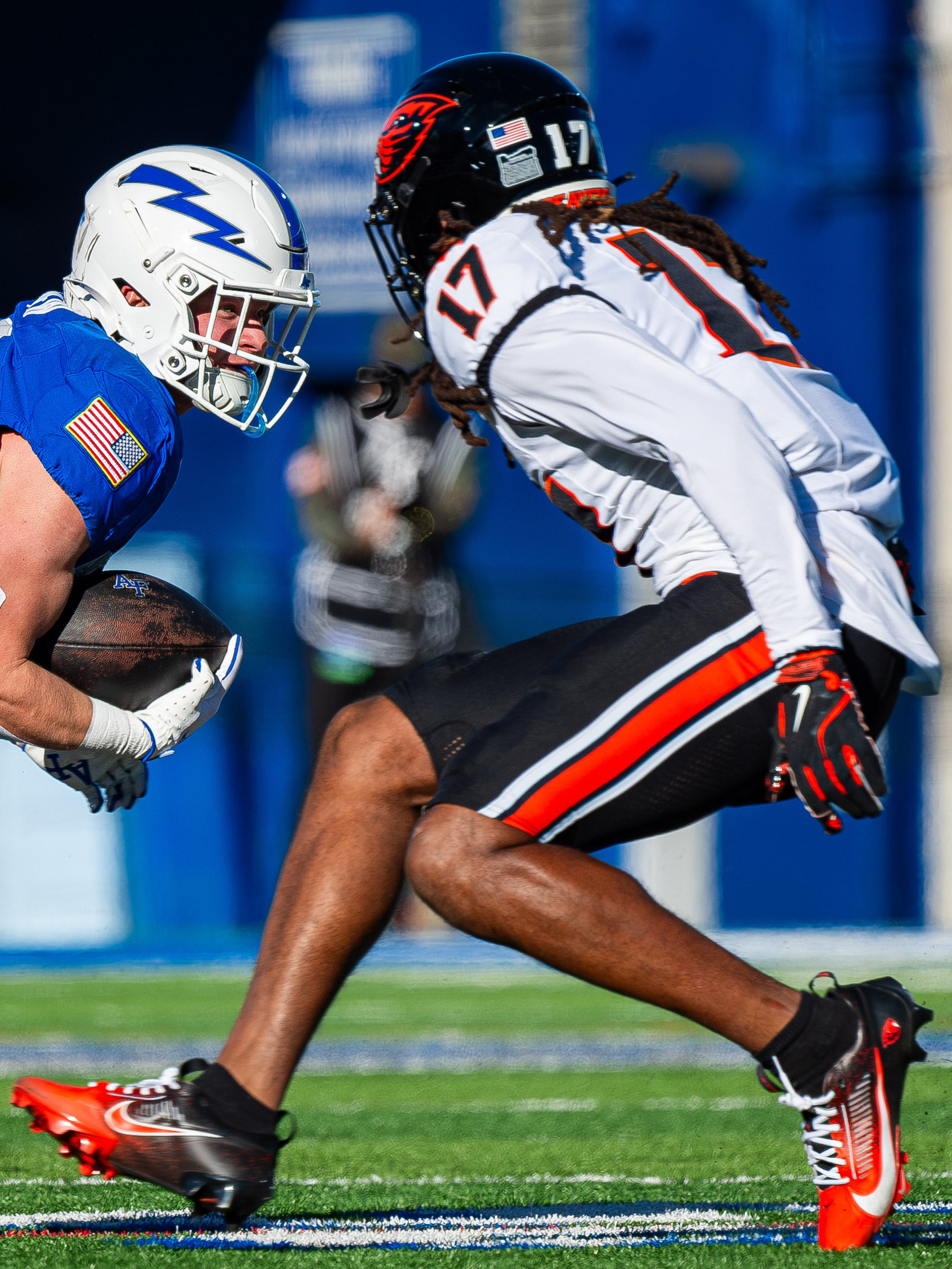
- Thomas (right) with Oregon State in 2024

No. 38 – Chicago Bears
- Position: Safety
- Roster status: Active

Personal information
- Born: September 17, 2003 (age 23); Redwood City, California, U.S.
- Listed height: 6 ft 2 in (1.88 m)
- Listed weight: 191 lb (87 kg)

Career information
- High school: Heard County (Franklin, Georgia)
- College: Oregon State (2021–2025)
- NFL draft: 2026: undrafted

Career history
- Chicago Bears (2026–present)

Career NFL statistics as of Week 7, 2026
- Total tackles: 6
- Stats at Pro Football Reference

Skyler Thomas (born September 17, 2003) is an American professional football safety for the Chicago Bears of the National Football League (NFL). He played college football for the Oregon State Beavers and he was signed as an undrafted free agent by the Bears in 2026.

== Early life ==
Thomas attended Menlo-Atherton High School in Atherton, California, before transferring to Heard County High School in Franklin, Georgia, for his senior season. He was rated as a three-star recruit by 247Sports and committed to play college football for the Oregon State Beavers over California.

== College career ==
As a freshman in 2021, Thomas played in 12 games, where he notched his first-career interception. In the 2022 season, he totaled 29 tackles with one being for a loss and a fumble recovery. Heading into the 2023 season, he was expected to be a major contributor, but suffered a season-ending knee injury in training camp. In 2024, Thomas posted a team-high 81 tackles, nine pass deflections, and an interception. In the 2025 season, he played in all 12 games, notching 78 tackles, four pass deflections, and an interception.

== Professional career ==
Pre-draft measurables
Height	Weight	Arm length	Hand span	Wingspan	40-yard dash	10-yard split	20-yard split	20-yard shuttle	Three-cone drill	Vertical jump	Broad jump	Bench press
6 ft 1 3/4 in (1.87 m)	210 lb (95 kg)	32 1/8 in (0.82 m)	9 1/2 in (0.24 m)	6 ft 6 3/4 in (2.00 m)	4.62 s	1.59 s	2.69 s	4.35 s	6.78 s	36.0 in (0.91 m)	10 ft 1 in (3.07 m)	11 reps
All values from Pro Day

Thomas was signed as an undrafted free agent by the Chicago Bears after the conclusion of the 2026 NFL draft.
