= John M. Ware Sr. House =

Historic house in Georgia, United States

- U.S. National Register of Historic Places
- Nearest city: Corinth, Georgia
- Area: 186.4 acres (0.754 km^{2})
- Built: 1838
- Built by: Ware, John M., Sr.; Et al.
- NRHP reference No.: 80001090
- Added to NRHP: November 3, 1980

The John M. Ware Sr. House, also known as the Ware House, near Corinth in Heard County, Georgia, was listed on the National Register of Historic Places in 1980.

The listing address was restricted. The listed property was 186.4 acres (0.754 km^{2}) in size and included four contributing buildings, seven contributing sites, and a contributing structure.

This clapboard house was built in 1838 and burned in the spring of 1983.

Ware family papers are archived.
