= Heard County Jail =

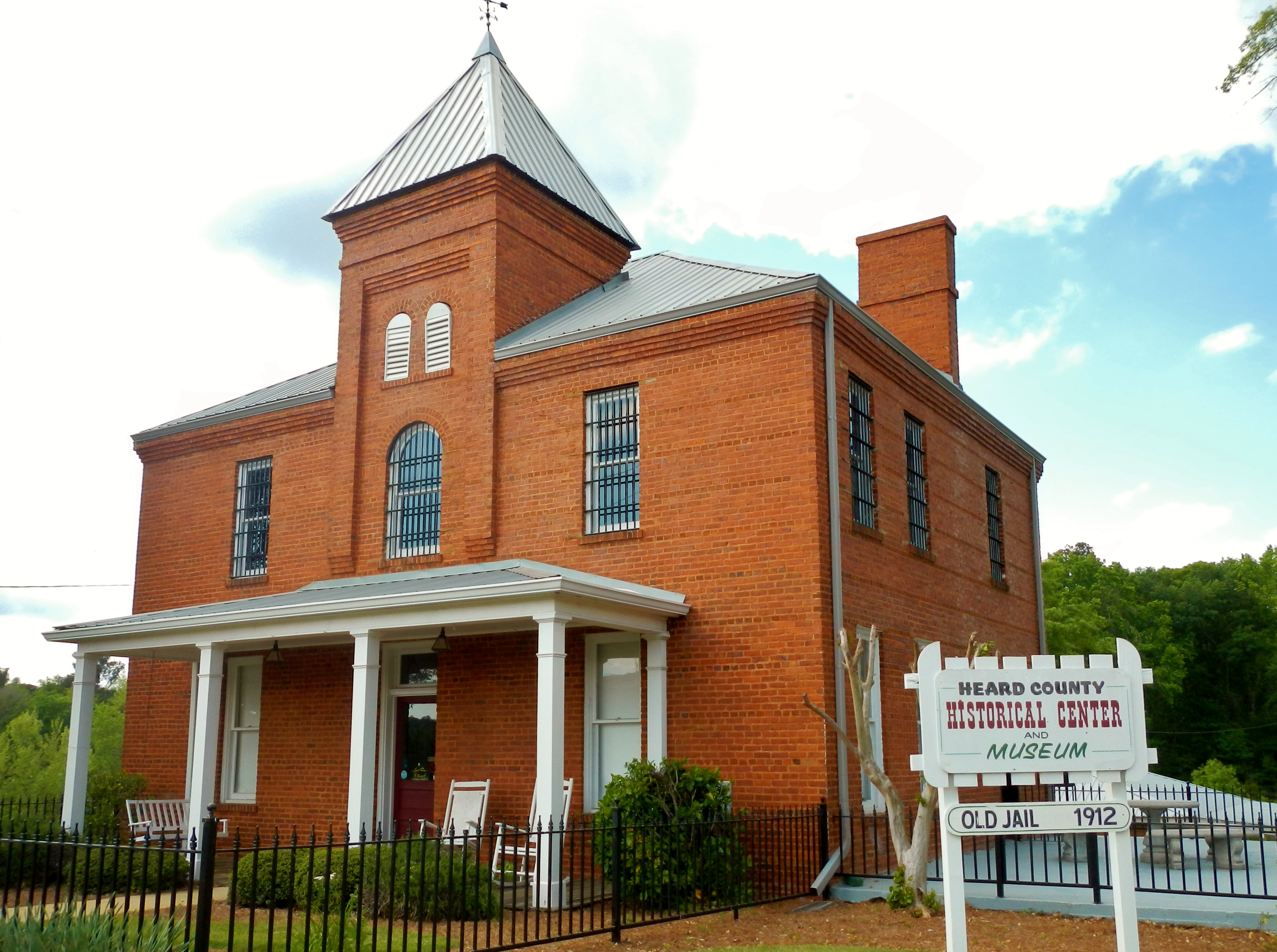
Heard County Jail, now the Heard County Historical Center and Museum

Heard County Jail is located on Court Square and Shady Lane in Franklin, Georgia. It was built in 1912 and served as county jail and sheriff's residence from 1912 to 1964. It was added to the National Register of Historic Places on January 27, 1981. The two main attractions within this building are a mannequin robed in Ku Klux Klan regalia and a reproduction of a still for making alcohol, representatives of the culture of the area. The building's coordinates are 33°16′48″N 85°05′57″W / 33.28°N 85.099167°W / 33.28; -85.099167

The Heard County Historical Society operates the Heard County Historical Center and Museum in the old jail. The Society was organized in 1979 and maintains an archive of historical records in the building.

== See also ==
- National Register of Historic Places listings in Heard County, Georgia
