= Bowdon High School =

Public high school in Bowdon, Georgia, United States

Location
- 504 West College Street; Bowdon, Georgia 30108; United States; 33°32′20″N 85°15′42″W

Information
- School type: Public high school
- Established: 1854 (172 years ago)
- School district: Carroll County School District
- CEEB code: 110415
- Principal: Jeffrey Bryant
- Staff: 25.50 (FTE)
- Grades: 9-12
- Enrollment: 395 (2023–2024)
- Student to teacher ratio: 15.49
- Colors: Red and black
- Nickname: Red Devils
- Rival: Bremen
- Website: bhs.carrollcountyschools.com

Bowdon High School is a public high school, part of the Carroll County School System, located in Bowdon, Georgia, United States. The school's mascot is the Red Devil.

== Athletics ==
The football team has won four consecutive state championships from 2022 – 2025.

== Notable alumni ==
- Nick Jones - NFL player and coach
- C. J. Brewer - NFL player
- Mike Dugan - American Politician
