= C. J. Brewer (defensive lineman) =

American football player (born 1997)

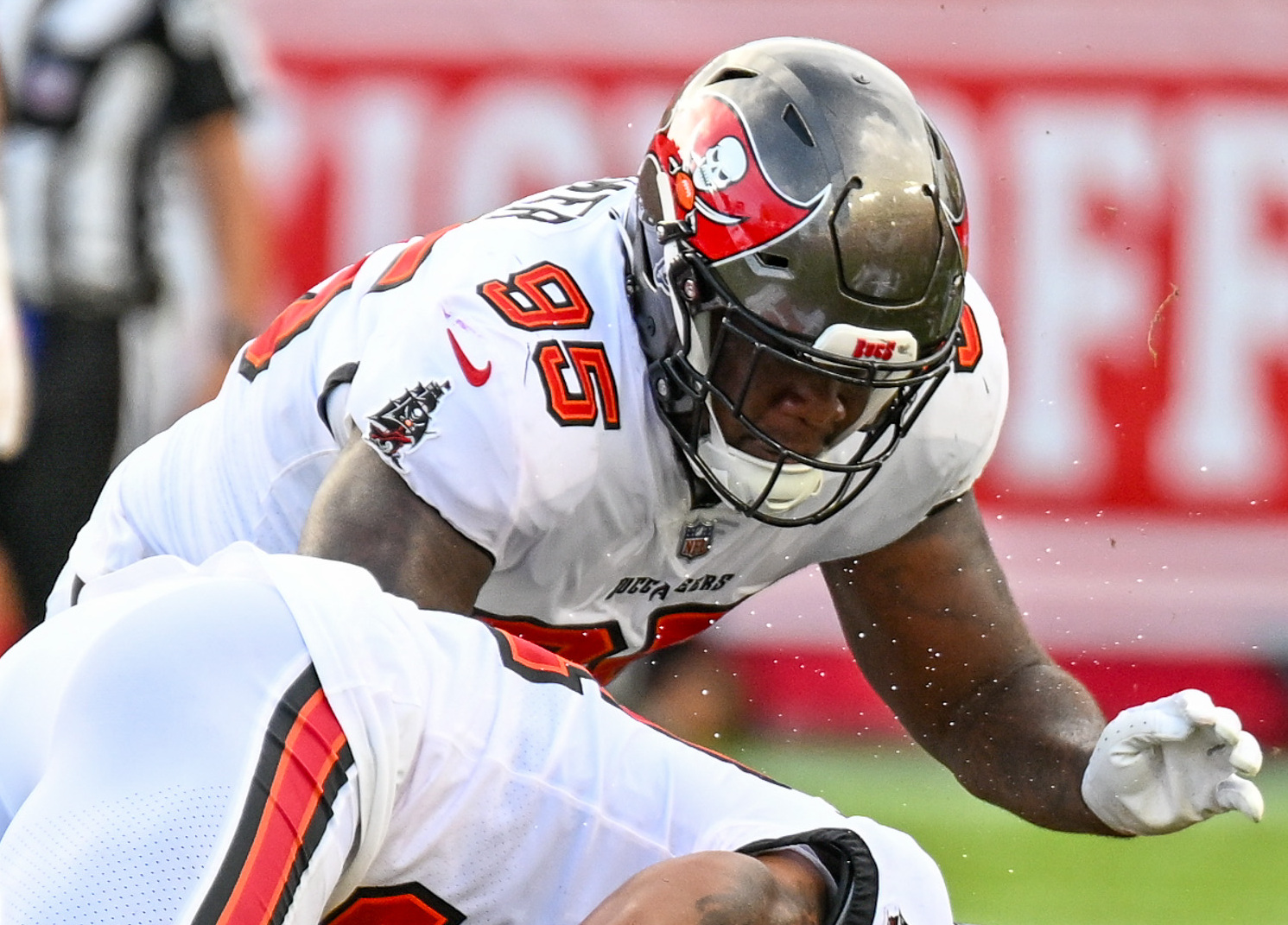
- Brewer with the Tampa Bay Buccaneers in 2024

Profile
- Position: Defensive end

Personal information
- Born: November 22, 1997 (age 28); Bowdon, Georgia, U.S.
- Listed height: 6 ft 2 in (1.88 m)
- Listed weight: 290 lb (132 kg)

Career information
- High school: Bowdon
- College: Coastal Carolina (2016–2021)
- NFL draft: 2022: undrafted

Career history
- Buffalo Bills (2022); Houston Roughnecks (2023); Tampa Bay Buccaneers (2023–2025)

Awards and highlights
- Third-team All-American (2020); 3× All-Sun Belt (2019, 2020, 2021)

Career NFL statistics as of 2025
- Total tackles: 18
- Sacks: 2.5
- Pass deflections: 2
- Stats at Pro Football Reference

C. J. Brewer (born November 22, 1997) is an American professional football defensive end. He played college football for the Coastal Carolina Chanticleers.

== Early life ==
Brewer was born on November 22, 1997, in Bowdon, Georgia. He attended Bowdon High School, where he participated in football and basketball. As a junior, he was named a first-team All-Region 5-AA selection at linebacker and a second-team choice as an offensive lineman. He was also the Times-Georgian Area Defensive Player of the Year and was named fourth-team all-state. As a senior, Brewer was named the Times-Georgian Al-Area most valuable player and the Defensive Player of the Year in the Region 5-AA. The Atlanta Journal-Constitution selected him as a first-team 5-AA all-state player and the Georgia Sports Writers Association named him a second-team selection. He was a Rivals.com two-star recruit.

== College career ==
Brewer committed to Coastal Carolina University, and spent his freshman year (2016) as a redshirt. In 2017, as a redshirt-freshman, he appeared in every game (12) as a defensive lineman, making his first career start on October 28 against the Texas State Bobcats. As a redshirt-sophomore during the 2018 season, Brewer started five games at defensive tackle and appeared in a total of nine, recording a total of 29 tackles and two forced fumbles.

Brewer was named third-team All-Sun Belt Conference following his redshirt-junior year, 2019, where he recorded 54 tackles and three quarterback sacks. He placed third on the team in tackles and also was third in tackles-for-loss with 7.5. He was a Dean's List student from fall 2019 to spring 2020, meaning he had a GPA of over 3.5.

Brewer was named to the 2020 preseason All-Sun Belt team by Phil Steele, Lindy's Sports, and Athlon Sports. He was made team captain prior to the beginning of the season and started all 12 games, being named first-team all-conference by Phil Steele, third-team All-America by Associated Press (AP) and honorable mention All-America by Steele. He earned Sun Belt Defensive Player of the Week honors once (on November 23) and ended the season second on the team with 6.5 sacks and fourth in the conference. With 60 total tackles, Brewer placed fifth on the Coastal Carolina roster. He also made 11 tackles-for-loss, which was good enough for third on the team, eighth in the conference. Against Kansas in the season-opener, he caught his only career touchdown pass.

All players were given an extra year of eligibility due to the COVID-19 pandemic, and Brewer chose to return to Coastal Carolina in 2021 as a fifth-year player (also referred to as a "super senior"). He was named preseason all-conference by Phil Steele (first-team), Athlon Sports (first-team), and Pro Football Focus (third-team), as well as preseason All-American by Athlon (fourth-team). An Outland Trophy and Bronko Nagurski Trophy watchlisted player, Brewer remained team captain and started all 13 games, recording 54 tackles, which ranked fifth on the team. He also compiled 9.5 tackles-for-loss, 4.5 sacks, six quarterback hurries, an interception, and a single fumble recovered. He was invited to the 2022 Hula Bowl, the senior all-star game, and was named first-team all-conference by Phil Steele and Pro Football Network, as well as second-team all-conference by Pro Football Focus. Brewer had six games with more than five tackles and was given the Tailgreeter Cure Bowl Community Service Soldier Award and the Team Community Service Award at the conclusion of the season. He was a member of the President's List, given to those with a GPA of 4.0, and was given a spot on the 2022 National Football Foundation (NFF) Hampshire Honor Society.

Brewer graduated with a bachelor's degree in history, and also received a master's degree in instructional technology. He finished his time at Coastal Carolina with a total of 58 games played, 230 total tackles (including 90 solo and 140 assisted), 32.5 tackles-for-loss and 16.0 sacks. Additionally, Brewer recorded one interception, seven passes defended, five forced fumbles and three recoveries in his five seasons with the team. His total tackles rank eighth in school history, and his 140 assisted tackles are fifth in the team record books. He also places fifth in team history for tackles-for-loss, third in quarterback hurries with 20, and fifth in sacks.

== Professional career ==
Pre-draft measurables
Height	Weight	Arm length	Hand span	40-yard dash	10-yard split	20-yard split	20-yard shuttle	Three-cone drill	Vertical jump	Broad jump	Bench press
6 ft 1 3/4 in (1.87 m)	288 lb (131 kg)	31 1/2 in (0.80 m)	9 3/8 in (0.24 m)	4.97 s	1.69 s	2.75 s	4.88 s	7.89 s	28.5 in (0.72 m)	9 ft 0 in (2.74 m)	24 reps
All values from Pro Day

=== Buffalo Bills ===
After going unselected in the 2022 NFL draft, Brewer was signed by the Buffalo Bills as an undrafted free agent. He was waived at the final roster cuts but re-signed to the practice squad shortly afterwards. He was elevated to the active roster on September 19 for their game with the Tennessee Titans, and made his NFL debut in the match, recording two tackles. He was reverted back to the practice squad on September 20. He was released on October 4. He was re-signed to the practice squad on November 26, 2022. He was promoted to the active roster on December 6. On December 13, he was released from the team.

=== Houston Roughnecks ===
Brewer was selected by the Houston Roughnecks of the XFL in the league's 2023 draft. He was released from his contract on May 15, 2023.

=== Tampa Bay Buccaneers ===
On May 15, 2023, Brewer signed with the Tampa Bay Buccaneers. He was waived on August 29, 2023, and re-signed to the practice squad. Brewer was released on November 14. On December 6, he was re-signed to the practice squad. He signed a reserve/future contract on January 23, 2024.

Brewer was waived by the team during roster cuts on August 27, 2024 and re-signed with the practice squad the next day. He was promoted to the active roster on September 20.

On August 26, 2025, Brewer was waived by the Buccaneers as part of final roster cuts and re-signed to the practice squad the next day. He was promoted to the active roster on September 23. On December 10, Brewer was waived and re-signed to the practice squad.
