= Glenn, Georgia =

Glenn
- Unincorporated community Census-designated place
- Location within Georgia Location within the United States
- Country: United States
- State: Georgia
- County: Heard

Population (2020)
  - Total: 101
- Time zone: UTC−6 (Central (CST))
  - Summer (DST): UTC−5 (CDT)

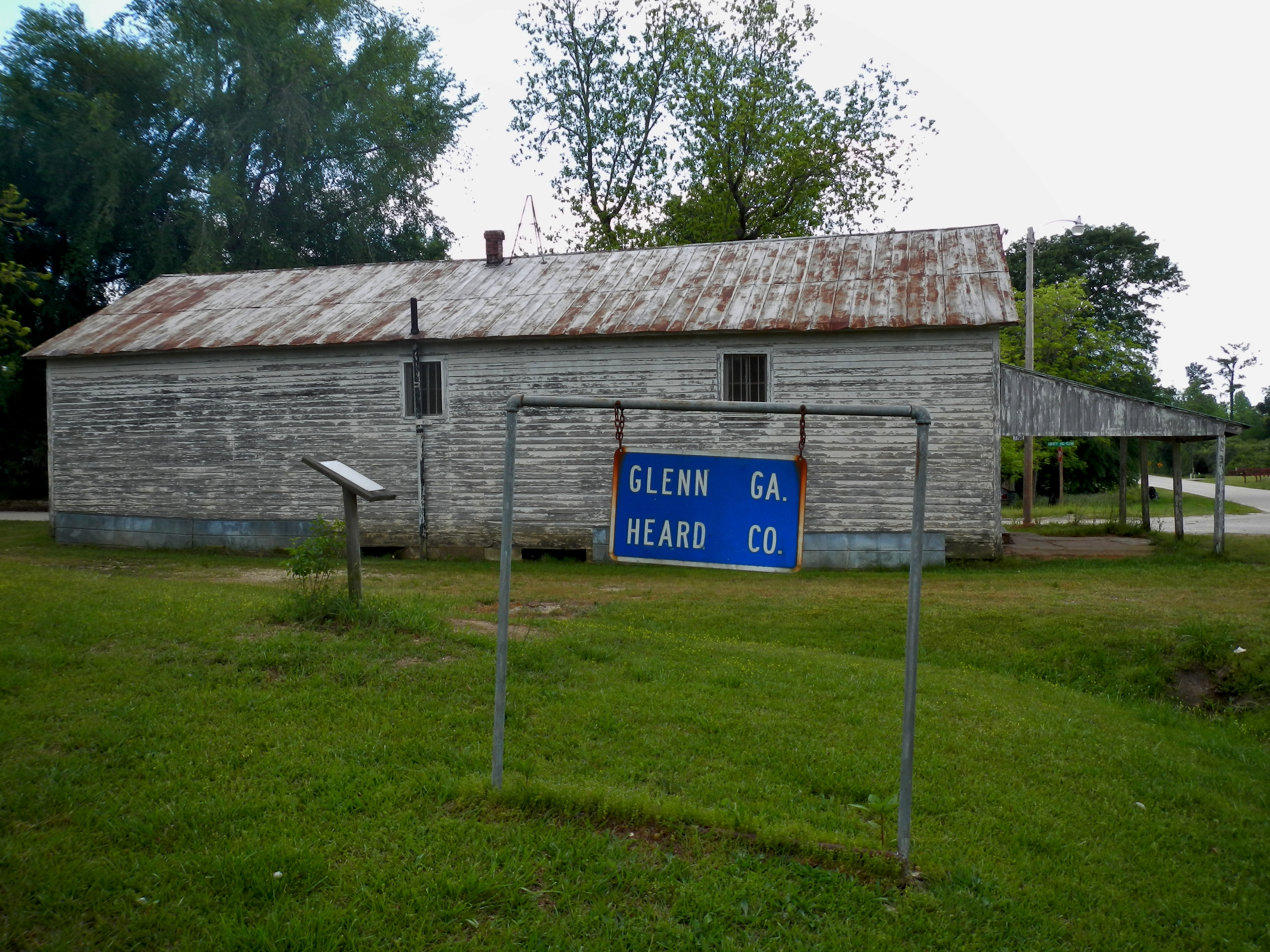
An old general store still stands at the crossroads of Glenn Road and Liberty Hill Road in Glenn.

Glenn is an unincorporated community and census-designated place in southwestern Heard County, Georgia, United States. It lies along local roads southwest of the city of Franklin, the county seat of Heard County. Its elevation is 820 feet (250 m), and it is located at 33°9′15″N 85°12′11″W (33.1542875, -85.2029992).

The 2020 census listed a population of 101.

== History ==
Glenn was named for Mr. George Glenn, one of the early white settlers in the area. Mr. Glenn operated a tanning yard, which was one of the first industries in the area.

The post office was established in 1887, with Mr. Thomas S. DeLoach as the first postmaster.

== Demographics ==
Historical population
Census	Pop.	Note	%±
2020	101		—
U.S. Decennial Census; 2020

Glenn CDP, Georgia – Racial and ethnic composition Note: the US Census treats Hispanic/Latino as an ethnic category. This table excludes Latinos from the racial categories and assigns them to a separate category. Hispanics/Latinos may be of any race.
Race / Ethnicity (NH = Non-Hispanic)	Pop 2020	% 2020
White alone (NH)	96	95.05%
Black or African American alone (NH)	0	0.00%
Native American or Alaska Native alone (NH)	0	0.00%
Asian alone (NH)	0	0.00%
Pacific Islander alone (NH)	0	0.00%
Some Other Race alone (NH)	1	0.99%
Mixed Race or Multi-Racial (NH)	4	3.96%
Hispanic or Latino (any race)	0	0.00%
Total	101	100.00%

Glenn first appeared as a census designated place in the 2020 U.S. census.

== Gallery ==
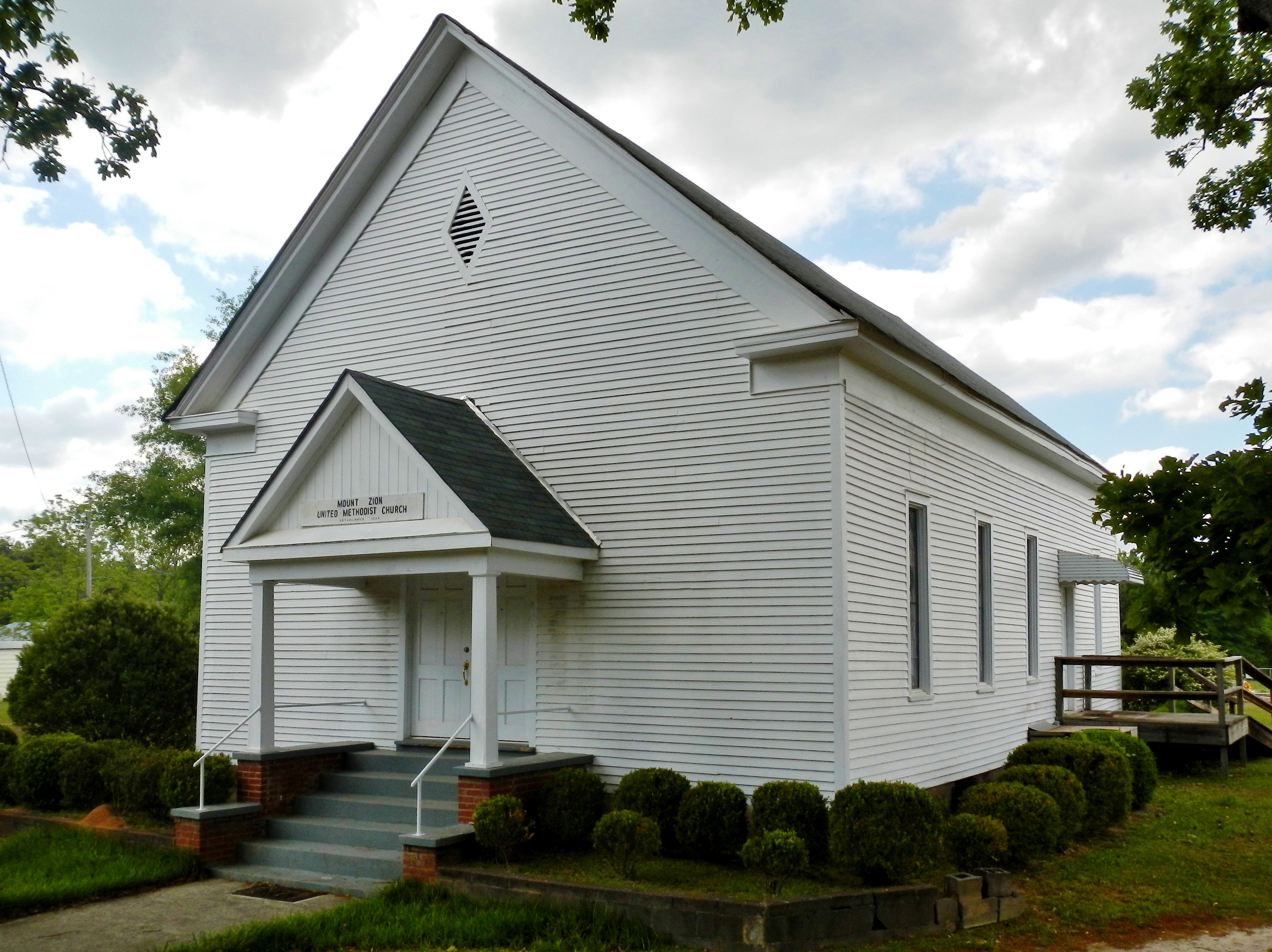
The Mt. Zion United Methodist Church was established in Glenn in 1825.

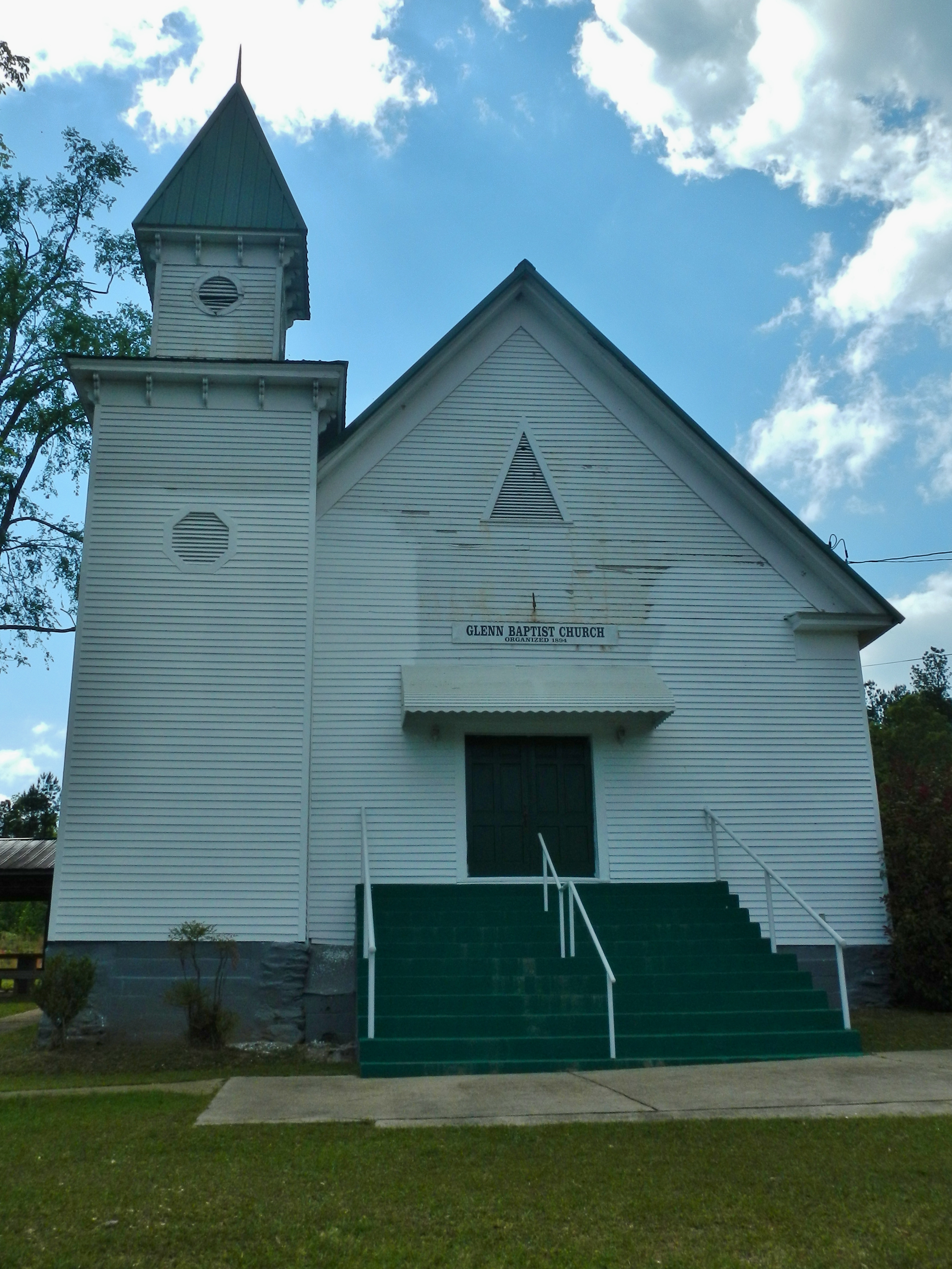
Glenn Baptist Church was established in 1894.
