= Heard County, Georgia =

County in Georgia, United States

- County
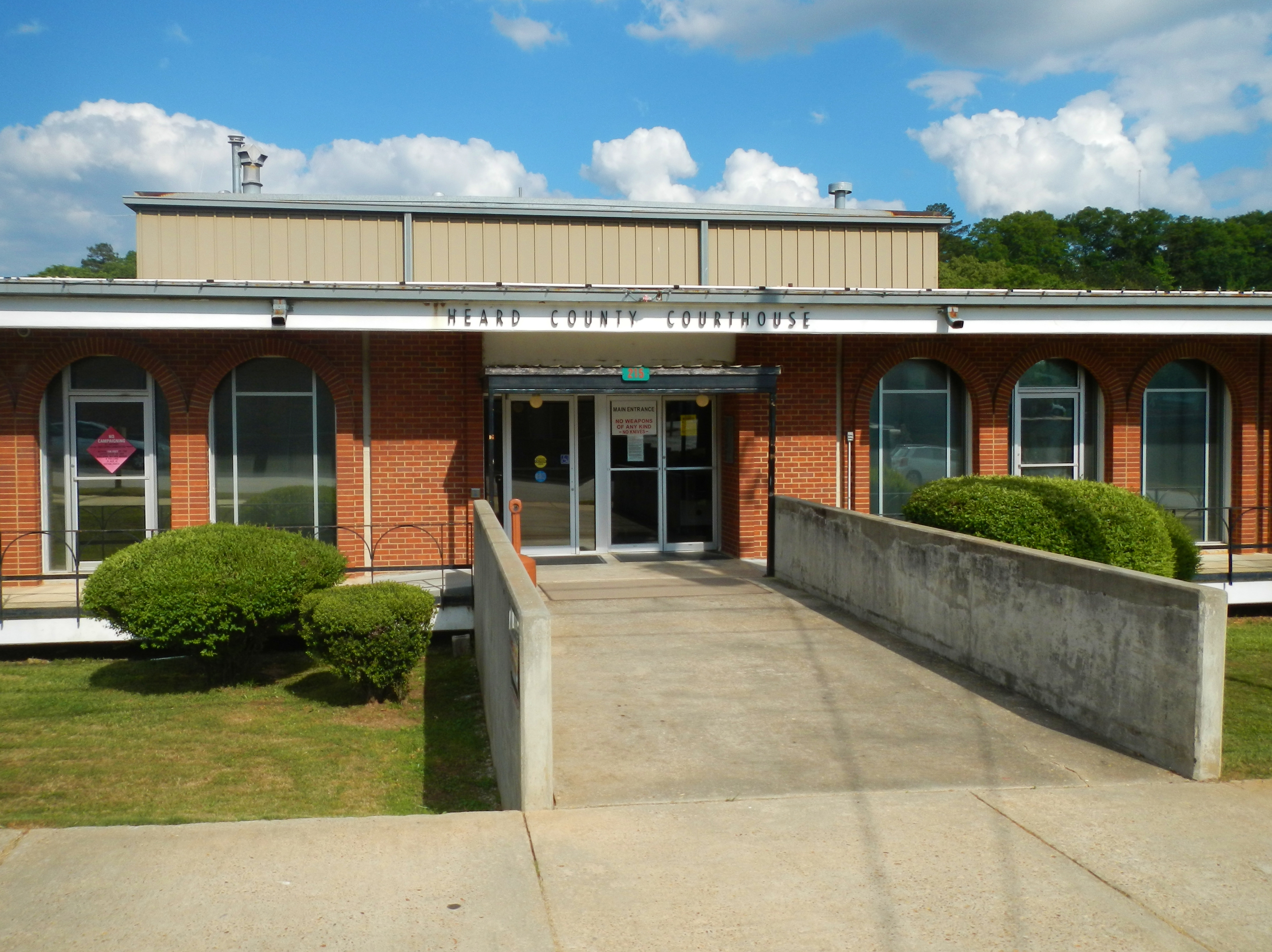
- Heard County courthouse in Franklin

- Location within the U.S. state of Georgia
- Coordinates: 33°18′N 85°08′W
- Country: United States
- State: Georgia
- Founded: December 22, 1830; 195 years ago
- Named for: Stephen Heard
- Seat: Franklin
- Largest city: Franklin

Area
  - Total: 301 sq mi (780 km^{2})
  - Land: 296 sq mi (770 km^{2})
  - Water: 5.1 sq mi (13 km^{2}) 1.7%

Population (2020)
  - Total: 11,412
  - Estimate (2025): 12,149 ▲
  - Density: 38/sq mi (15/km^{2})
- Time zone: UTC−5 (Eastern)
  - Summer (DST): UTC−4 (EDT)
- Congressional district: 3rd
- Website: heardcountyga.com

Heard County is a county located in the West Central region of the U.S. state of Georgia. At the 2020 census, the population was 11,412, down from 11,834 in 2010. The county seat is Franklin. The county was created on December 22, 1830.

Heard County is included in the Atlanta-Sandy Springs-Roswell MSA.

== History ==
Heard County was created by Act of the Legislature on December 22, 1830. It was named for Stephen Heard, elected President of the Council on February 18, 1781, thus, in the absence of Governor Howley, becoming Governor de facto. Heard moved to Wilkes County from Hanover County, Virginia, and fought in the American Revolutionary War where he distinguished himself at Kettle Creek. The first sheriff, Jonathan Mewsick, was commissioned in 1832.

== Geography ==
According to the U.S. Census Bureau, the county has a total area of 301 square miles (780 km^{2}), of which 296 square miles (770 km^{2}) is land and 5.1 square miles (13 km^{2}) (1.7%) is water.

The vast majority of Heard County is located in the Middle Chattahoochee River-Lake Harding sub-basin of the ACF River Basin (Apalachicola-Chattahoochee-Flint River Basin), with just a very small northwestern corner of the county, west of Ephesus, located in the Upper Tallapoosa River sub-basin of the ACT River Basin (Coosa-Tallapoosa River Basin).

=== Major highways ===
- U.S. Route 27 / State Route 1
- State Route 34
- State Route 100
- State Route 219

=== Adjacent counties ===
- Carroll County (north)
- Coweta County (east)
- Troup County (south)
- Randolph County, Alabama (west/Central Time border)

== Communities ==
=== Cities ===
- Ephesus
- Franklin (county seat)

=== Towns ===
- Centralhatchee

=== Census-designated places ===
- Glenn

=== Unincorporated communities ===
- Corinth (part)
- Texas

== Demographics ==
Historical population
Census	Pop.	Note	%±
1840	5,329		—
1850	6,923		29.9%
1860	7,805		12.7%
1870	7,866		0.8%
1880	8,769		11.5%
1890	9,557		9.0%
1900	11,177		17.0%
1910	11,189		0.1%
1920	11,126		−0.6%
1930	9,102		−18.2%
1940	8,610		−5.4%
1950	6,975		−19.0%
1960	5,333		−23.5%
1970	5,354		0.4%
1980	6,520		21.8%
1990	8,628		32.3%
2000	11,012		27.6%
2010	11,834		7.5%
2020	11,412		−3.6%
2025 (est.)	12,149	▲	6.5%
U.S. Decennial Census; 1790-1880 1890-1910; 1920-1930 1930-1940; 1940-1950 1960-1980; 1980-2000 2010 2020

=== Racial and ethnic composition ===
Heard County, Georgia – Racial and ethnic composition Note: the US Census treats Hispanic/Latino as an ethnic category. This table excludes Latinos from the racial categories and assigns them to a separate category. Hispanics/Latinos may be of any race.
Race / Ethnicity (NH = Non-Hispanic)	Pop 1980	Pop 1990	Pop 2000	Pop 2010	Pop 2020	% 1980	% 1990	% 2000	% 2010	% 2020
White alone (NH)	5,352	7,378	9,580	10,190	9,589	82.09%	85.51%	87.00%	86.11%	84.03%
Black or African American alone (NH)	1,084	1,150	1,181	1,152	930	16.63%	13.33%	10.72%	9.73%	8.15%
Native American or Alaska Native alone (NH)	17	12	34	32	33	0.26%	0.14%	0.31%	0.27%	0.29%
Asian alone (NH)	9	20	11	56	53	0.14%	0.23%	0.10%	0.47%	0.46%
Native Hawaiian or Pacific Islander alone (NH)	x	x	7	2	4	x	x	0.06%	0.02%	0.04%
Other race alone (NH)	1	0	18	4	29	0.02%	0.00%	0.16%	0.03%	0.25%
Mixed race or Multiracial (NH)	x	x	65	175	521	x	x	0.59%	1.48%	4.57%
Hispanic or Latino (any race)	57	68	116	223	253	0.87%	0.79%	1.05%	1.88%	2.22%
Total	6,520	8,628	11,012	11,834	11,412	100.00%	100.00%	100.00%	100.00%	100.00%

=== 2020 census ===
As of the 2020 census, the county had a population of 11,412, 4,278 households, and 3,254 families residing in the county. The median age was 41.0 years, with 23.8% of residents under the age of 18 and 16.0% aged 65 years or older.

For every 100 females there were 97.9 males, and for every 100 females age 18 and over there were 95.1 males age 18 and over. None of the residents lived in urban areas while 100.0% lived in rural areas.

The racial makeup of the county was 84.8% White, 8.3% Black or African American, 0.3% American Indian and Alaska Native, 0.5% Asian, 0.1% Native Hawaiian and Pacific Islander, 0.9% from some other race, and 5.3% from two or more races. Hispanic or Latino residents of any race comprised 2.2% of the population.

There were 4,278 households in the county, of which 33.5% had children under the age of 18 living with them and 25.0% had a female householder with no spouse or partner present. About 24.1% of all households were made up of individuals and 11.1% had someone living alone who was 65 years of age or older.

There were 4,742 housing units, of which 9.8% were vacant. Among occupied housing units, 71.5% were owner-occupied and 28.5% were renter-occupied. The homeowner vacancy rate was 1.2% and the rental vacancy rate was 5.0%.

== Politics ==
Heard County is a Republican stronghold which voted 85.9% for Donald Trump in 2024.

For elections to the United States House of Representatives, Heard County is part of Georgia's 3rd congressional district.

For elections to the Georgia State Senate, Heard County is a part of District 6. For elections to the Georgia House of Representatives, Heard County is part of District 72.

United States presidential election results for Heard County, Georgia
Year	Republican		Democratic		Third party(ies)	
Year	No.	%	No.	%	No.	%
1912	11	1.83%	526	87.38%	65	10.80%
1916	11	2.15%	439	85.74%	62	12.11%
1920	14	2.95%	461	97.05%	0	0.00%
1924	35	9.49%	327	88.62%	7	1.90%
1928	390	44.17%	493	55.83%	0	0.00%
1932	24	2.36%	989	97.34%	3	0.30%
1936	155	17.55%	725	82.11%	3	0.34%
1940	221	25.40%	647	74.37%	2	0.23%
1944	185	24.93%	557	75.07%	0	0.00%
1948	77	9.63%	670	83.75%	53	6.63%
1952	184	13.40%	1,189	86.60%	0	0.00%
1956	194	14.92%	1,106	85.08%	0	0.00%
1960	181	12.88%	1,224	87.12%	0	0.00%
1964	807	43.18%	1,061	56.77%	1	0.05%
1968	303	16.72%	356	19.65%	1,153	63.63%
1972	1,239	81.78%	276	18.22%	0	0.00%
1976	433	21.37%	1,593	78.63%	0	0.00%
1980	875	38.33%	1,348	59.05%	60	2.63%
1984	1,492	64.81%	810	35.19%	0	0.00%
1988	1,551	63.77%	874	35.94%	7	0.29%
1992	1,190	36.36%	1,456	44.49%	627	19.16%
1996	1,170	41.14%	1,248	43.88%	426	14.98%
2000	1,947	60.88%	1,178	36.84%	73	2.28%
2004	2,788	70.48%	1,148	29.02%	20	0.51%
2008	3,133	74.05%	1,042	24.63%	56	1.32%
2012	3,160	75.63%	948	22.69%	70	1.68%
2016	3,370	79.41%	743	17.51%	131	3.09%
2020	4,519	83.78%	824	15.28%	51	0.95%
2024	5,335	85.91%	859	13.83%	16	0.26%

United States Senate election results for Heard County, Georgia2
Year	Republican		Democratic		Third party(ies)	
Year	No.	%	No.	%	No.	%
2020	4,413	82.83%	802	15.05%	113	2.12%
2020	3,895	83.32%	780	16.68%	0	0.00%

United States Senate election results for Heard County, Georgia3
Year	Republican		Democratic		Third party(ies)	
Year	No.	%	No.	%	No.	%
2020	2,542	48.45%	592	11.28%	2,113	40.27%
2020	3,877	82.88%	801	17.12%	0	0.00%
2022	3,877	83.47%	675	14.53%	93	2.00%
2022	3,407	84.21%	639	15.79%	0	0.00%

Georgia Gubernatorial election results for Heard County
Year	Republican		Democratic		Third party(ies)	
Year	No.	%	No.	%	No.	%
2022	3,858	86.44%	568	12.73%	37	0.83%

== Education ==
The Heard County School District has five schools, including the Heard County High School.

== See also ==
- National Register of Historic Places listings in Heard County, Georgia
- List of counties in Georgia
