= Nick Jones (offensive lineman, born 1985) =

American football player and coach (born 1985)

Atlanta Falcons
- Title: Assistant offensive line coach

Personal information
- Born: July 5, 1985 (age 41); Bowdon, Georgia, U.S.
- Listed height: 6 ft 1 in (1.85 m)
- Listed weight: 300 lb (136 kg)

Career information
- Position: Center
- High school: Bowdon
- College: Georgia
- NFL draft: 2007: undrafted

Career history

Playing
- Seattle Seahawks (2007)*; New York Giants (2007)*; Georgia Force (2007)*; Seattle Seahawks (2008)*; Detroit Lions (2008)*; Seattle Seahawks (2008)*
- * Offseason or practice squad member only

Coaching
- Georgia (2010–2011) Graduate assistant; Coastal Carolina (2012–2017) Tight ends coach & tackles coach; Air Force (2018) Tight ends coach; Colorado State (2019) Co-special teams coordinator & tight ends coach; Atlanta Falcons (2020) Diversity coaching fellow; Los Angeles Rams (2021–2023) Offensive assistant; Atlanta Falcons (2024–present) Assistant offensive line coach

Awards and highlights
- As a coach: Super Bowl champion (LVI); As a player: Second-team All-SEC (2006)

Nick Jones (born July 5, 1985) is an American football coach and former player. He is the assistant offensive line coach for the Atlanta Falcons of the National Football League (NFL). He played center for the Georgia Bulldogs.

Pre-draft measurables
| Height | Weight | 40-yard dash | 10-yard split | 20-yard split | 20-yard shuttle | Three-cone drill | Vertical jump | Broad jump | Bench press |
|---|---|---|---|---|---|---|---|---|---|
| 6 ft 1 3/8 in (1.86 m) | 300 lb (136 kg) | 5.22 s | 1.73 s | 2.93 s | 4.78 s | 7.66 s | 23.5 in (0.60 m) | 7 ft 11 in (2.41 m) | 22 reps |
All values from Pro Day

== Coaching career ==
Jones was an offensive graduate assistant for Georgia in 2010 and 2011. He was the tight ends coach and tackles coach for Coastal Carolina from 2012 to 2017. Jones coached tight ends for Air Force in 2018. Jones was hired by Colorado State as co-special teams coordinator and tight ends coach in February 2019. He joined the Atlanta Falcons in 2020 as a diversity coaching fellow. He was hired by Georgia Southern as their special teams coordinator and tight ends coach in January 2021, but left to join the Los Angeles Rams as an offensive assistant on February 23, 2021. In Jones first season, the Rams won Super Bowl LVI against the Cincinnati Bengals. He was hired on February 2, 2024, by the Atlanta Falcons, to be an assistant offensive line coach.
