= Texas, Georgia =

Unincorporated community in Georgia, U.S.

Coordinates: 33°14′27″N 85°11′56″W

Texas is an unincorporated community in Heard County, in the U.S. state of Georgia.

== History ==
A post office called Texas was established in 1873, and remained in operation until 1940. The community was named after the state of Texas.
