= Personnel grouping (gridiron football) =

Situational group of players in American football

Personnel groupings are groups of players used in American football to identify the different types of skill position players on the field of play for an offense. Personnel groupings, also known as personnel packages, are commonly denoted using a two-digit numerical system that identifies the type of offensive personnel, and the number of each type of personnel. Teams use personnel groupings in order to set a base for most of their plays, as well as being able to send out players in a timely manner during a game.

== Formations ==
The groupings used in different formations can vary depending on what the coach and offense want to do, but there are generally different types of personnel used for either a running or passing play. However, given their complementary nature, it is not uncommon to pass out of a run personnel grouping or vice versa. The goal is to create favorable match-ups and force the defense to adjust and react while controlling the clock.

== Numerical naming ==
Usually, personnel groupings are differentiated using a numerical system to set apart the running backs, tight ends, and wide receivers. When naming a personnel grouping, a specific number system is used to refer to the number of running backs and tight ends on the field. For example, a grouping of one running back and two tight ends on the field is called 12 personnel. A grouping of two running backs and one tight end is referred to as 21 personnel. The number of wide receivers on the field is implicit, based on the fact that eleven offensive players are allowed on the field, including five linemen and the quarterback. An extra lineman can be indicated by an asterisk (*), so 11* personnel would be 2 wide receivers, a back, a tight end, and 6 linemen. Defenses are able to substitute players that will allow them to match up more favorably against the personnel group that is used by the offense. In 2013, NFL teams used 11 personnel on 51.62% of offensive plays, meaning that there were three wide receivers on the field. Over the past few years, the NFL has transitioned to a more pass-heavy league, which explains a league average that has a personnel grouping with multiple passing options for the quarterback.

== Examples from the NFL ==
The NFL and the sport itself are always changing and teams are constantly trying to gain a competitive advantage by adapting and executing new concepts. One of the most popular offensive schemes is the West Coast offense, popularized by three time Super Bowl–winning coach Bill Walsh. This offense requires short and intermediate passing plays that will then require the defense to react and adjust accordingly, thus allowing a team to run the ball and have more success in that area of its offense. Within the West Coast offense, personnel groupings are very prevalent and due to a high volume of passing plays within the offense a lot of skill positions that can catch and give the quarterback multiple options to go to with the ball are important. Personnel groupings give teams ability to create plays that give them success and, as the West Coast offense has proven with its many different iterations that teams have used, the ability to win games.
