= Bowdon, Georgia =

- City
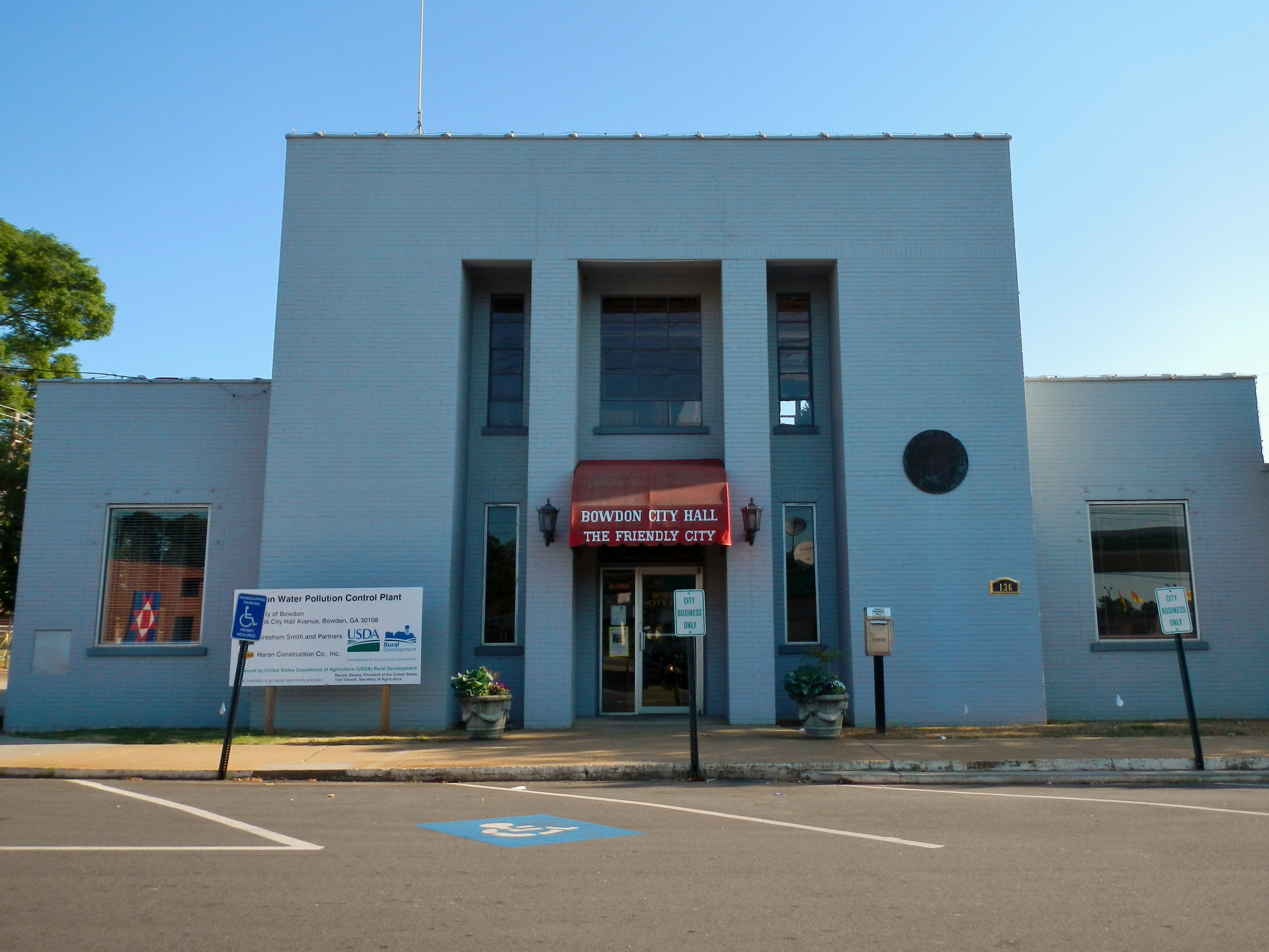
- Bowdon City Hall

- Seal
- Motto: "The Friendly City"
- Location in Carroll County and the state of Georgia
- Coordinates: 33°32′22″N 85°15′21″W
- Country: United States
- State: Georgia
- County: Carroll

Area
  - Total: 3.40 sq mi (8.80 km^{2})
  - Land: 3.40 sq mi (8.80 km^{2})
  - Water: 0 sq mi (0.00 km^{2})
- Elevation: 1,079 ft (329 m)

Population (2020)
  - Total: 2,161
  - Density: 635.7/sq mi (245.44/km^{2})
- Time zone: UTC-5 (Eastern (EST))
  - Summer (DST): UTC-4 (EDT)
- ZIP code: 30108
- Area code: 770
- FIPS code: 13-09544
- GNIS feature ID: 0354818
- Website: City of Bowdon Georgia Website

Bowdon is a city in Carroll County, Georgia, United States. As of the 2020 census, the city had a population of 2,161.

== History ==
The community was incorporated on January 1, 1859, and was named after Alabama congressman Franklin Welsh Bowdon.

Bowdon College was established in Bowdon in 1857 but closed in 1936.

Bowdon was formerly served by the Bowdon Railway, in operation from 1910 to 1963.

On August 21, 1995, Atlantic Southeast Airlines Flight 529 crashed between Bowdon and neighboring city Carrollton.

== Geography ==
Bowdon is located near the Georgia-Alabama state line at 33° 32′ 22″ N, 85° 15′ 21″ W (33.539444 N, -85.255833 W). The main highways through the city are Georgia State Routes 100 and 166. GA-100 runs through the city from north to south, leading north 16 mi (26 km) to Tallapoosa and south 11 mi (18 km) to Ephesus. GA-166 runs through the city from west to east, leading east 12 mi (19 km) to Carrollton, the county seat, and west 4 mi (6.4 km) to its end at the Alabama-Georgia state line.

According to the United States Census Bureau, Bowdon has a total area of 3.4 square miles (8.8 km^{2}), all land.

=== Climate ===
Bowdon has generally mild winters, with highs averaging in the low to mid 50s and lows around 32. Usually, there are one or two days each winter when lows drop below 15. Snow is infrequent, averaging about 2" per winter. Some winters, however, experience no snowfall. Ice is more common than snow. Rainfall is usually plentiful in the winter.

Although severe weather is not very common, it does happen in the winter. The most recent severe weather event occurred on February 26, 2008, when an EF3 tornado hit an area about four miles north of Bowdon.

The fall and spring months tend to bring the nicest weather, with numerous sunny days. Highs in the spring average in the 70s and lows average in the 40s and 50s. There is often severe weather in the spring, with occasionally a tornado. Fall tends to be the nicest season, with plentiful sunshine and highs in the 60s and 70s. Towards the end of fall, lows can drop below 30.

Summer is often very humid and hot, although the heat is relieved by afternoon thunderstorms which occur almost daily. The summer of 2007 was one of the hottest on record, with several days recording highs above 100. Highs in the summer are generally around 90 with lows in the 60s.

On May 11, 2008, Bowdon was hit by a series of tornadoes known as the "Mother's Day Storm", with a few reported injuries, but no deaths.

== Demographics ==
Historical population
Census	Pop.	Note	%±
1860	304		—
1870	350		15.1%
1880	333		−4.9%
1890	354		6.3%
1900	307		−13.3%
1910	541		76.2%
1920	1,047		93.5%
1930	1,024		−2.2%
1940	1,024		0.0%
1950	1,155		12.8%
1960	1,548		34.0%
1970	1,753		13.2%
1980	1,743		−0.6%
1990	1,981		13.7%
2000	1,959		−1.1%
2010	2,040		4.1%
2020	2,161		5.9%
U.S. Decennial Census

=== 2020 census ===
As of the 2020 census, Bowdon had a population of 2,161. The median age was 37.6 years. 24.6% of residents were under the age of 18 and 17.3% of residents were 65 years of age or older. For every 100 females there were 89.4 males, and for every 100 females age 18 and over there were 84.5 males age 18 and over.

0.0% of residents lived in urban areas, while 100.0% lived in rural areas.

There were 882 households in Bowdon, of which 36.2% had children under the age of 18 living in them. Of all households, 38.8% were married-couple households, 19.7% were households with a male householder and no spouse or partner present, and 33.7% were households with a female householder and no spouse or partner present. About 27.8% of all households were made up of individuals and 13.4% had someone living alone who was 65 years of age or older.

There were 972 housing units, of which 9.3% were vacant. The homeowner vacancy rate was 1.9% and the rental vacancy rate was 6.7%.

Bowdon racial composition as of 2020
Race	Num.	Perc.
White	1,451	67.14%
Black or African American	491	22.72%
Native American	7	0.32%
Asian	6	0.28%
Other/mixed	139	6.43%
Hispanic or Latino	67	3.1%

== Media ==
Bowdon is the city of license for Top 40 radio station Power 105.3 WWPW.

== Notable people ==
- C. J. Brewer, #62 defensive tackle for the Tampa Bay Buccaneers
- Bull Buchanan, current Rampage Pro Wrestling World Heavyweight Champion
- Mike Dugan, Georgia State Senate majority leader
- Michael Huey, recording studio owner and touring drummer
- Nick Jones, football player, twice signed by the Seattle Seahawks
