= Ephesus, Georgia =

- City
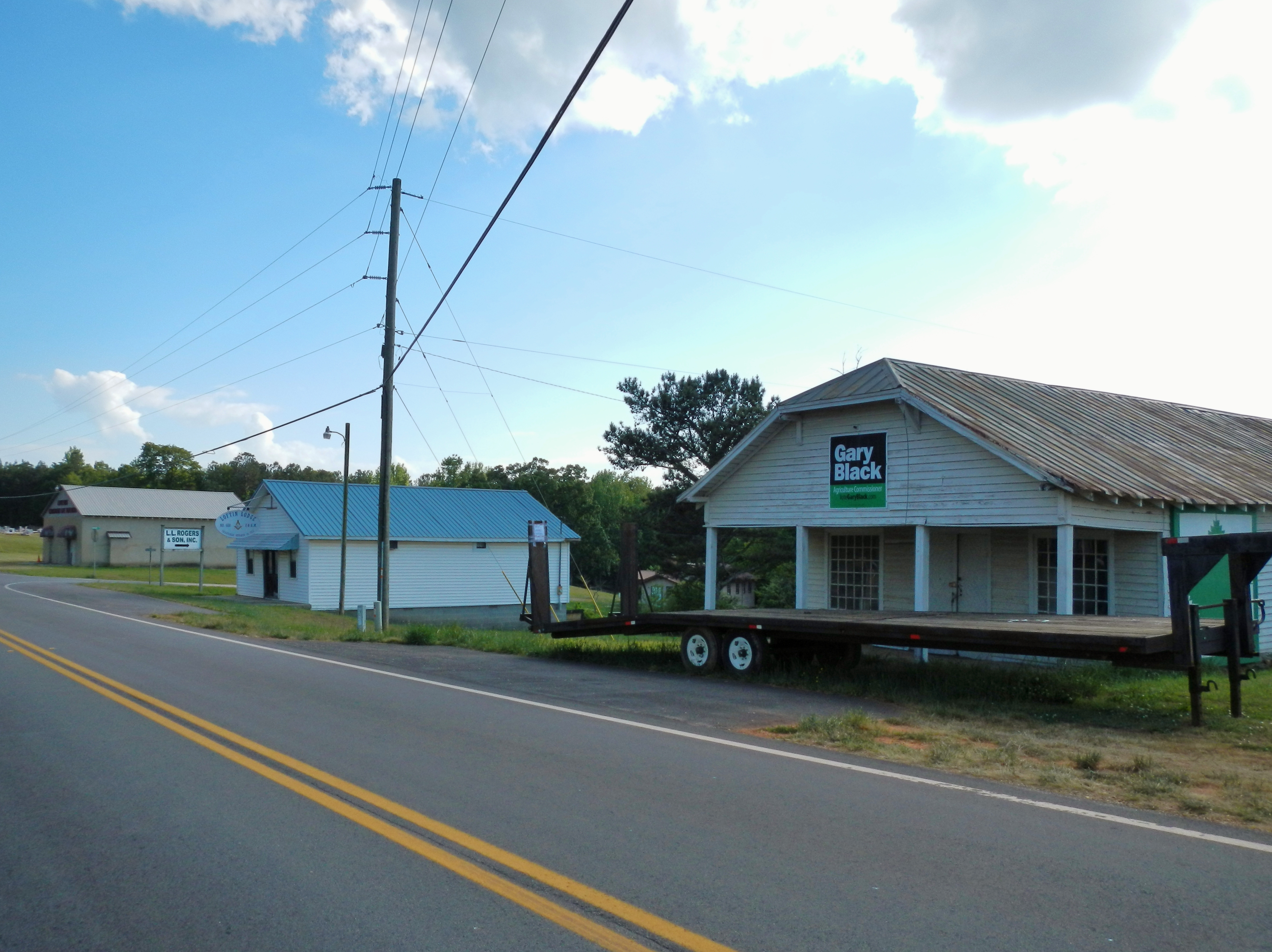
- Ephesus in 2012

- Location in Heard County and the state of Georgia
- Coordinates: 33°24′18″N 85°15′35″W
- Country: United States
- State: Georgia
- County: Heard

Government
  - Mayor: Denney Rogers

Area
  - Total: 3.69 sq mi (9.57 km^{2})
  - Land: 3.69 sq mi (9.57 km^{2})
  - Water: 0 sq mi (0.00 km^{2})
- Elevation: 1,234 ft (376 m)

Population (2020)
  - Total: 471
  - Density: 127.5/sq mi (49.22/km^{2})
- Time zone: UTC-5 (Eastern (EST))
  - Summer (DST): UTC-4 (EDT)
- ZIP Code: 30170, 30108
- Area code: 706
- FIPS code: 13-27708
- GNIS feature ID: 0355709
- Website: https://www.ephesusga.com/

Ephesus is a city in Heard County, Georgia, United States. The city was founded as "Loftin", and was incorporated as "Ephesus" in 1964, after the local church and school, which had been named for the biblical city of Ephesus in present-day Turkey. The population was 471 in 2020.

Postal addresses within the city do not use the Ephesus name, instead using the city names of Roopville and Bowdon.

== Geography ==
Ephesus is located in the northwest corner of Heard County at 33°24′18″N 85°15′35″W (33.405084, -85.259625). It is 2 miles (3 km) east of the Alabama border. Georgia State Route 100 passes through the center of town, leading north 10 miles (16 km) to Bowdon and southeast 14 miles (23 km) to Franklin, the Heard County seat. Carrollton, the nearest city with more than 20,000 people, is 17 miles (27 km) to the northeast.

According to the United States Census Bureau, Ephesus has an area of 3.0 square miles (7.8 km^{2}), all land.

== Demographics ==
Historical population
Census	Pop.	Note	%±
1970	212		—
1980	184		−13.2%
1990	324		76.1%
2000	388		19.8%
2010	427		10.1%
2020	471		10.3%
U.S. Decennial Census

As of the census of 2000, there were 388 people, 154 households, and 111 families residing in the town. In 2020, its population was 471.

== Gallery ==
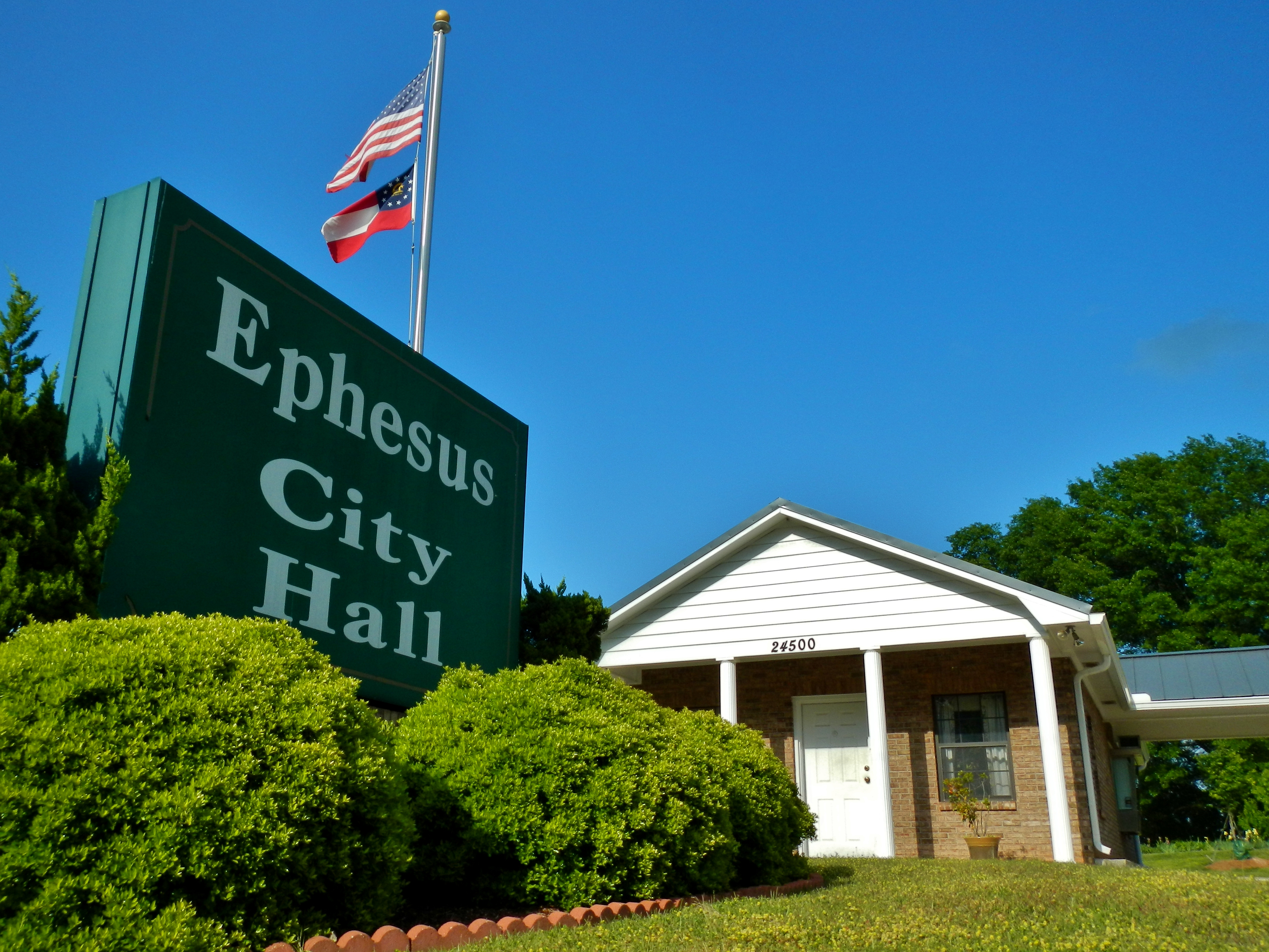
Ephesus City Hall

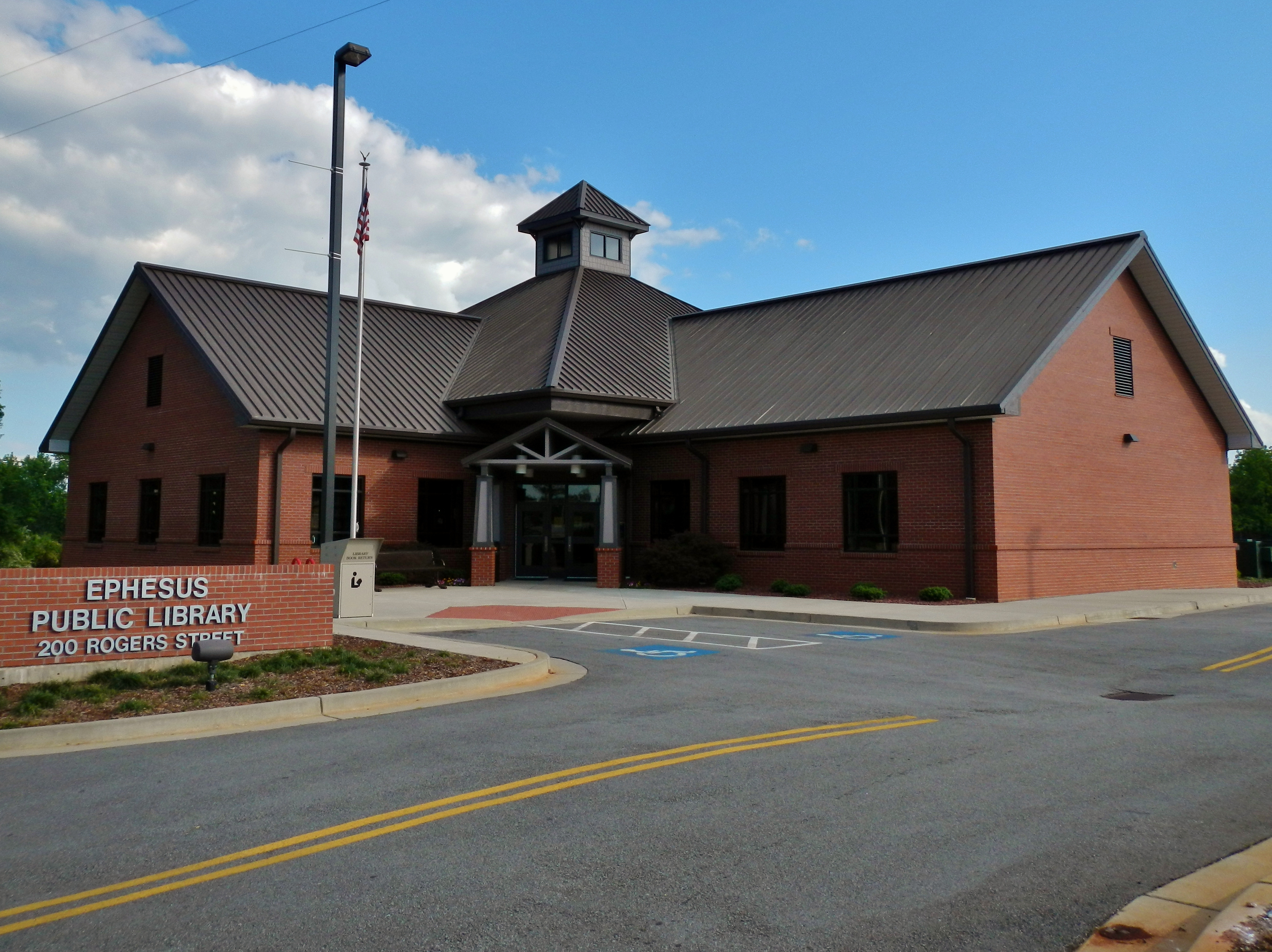
Ephesus Public Library
