= Corinth, Georgia =

- Unincorporated community
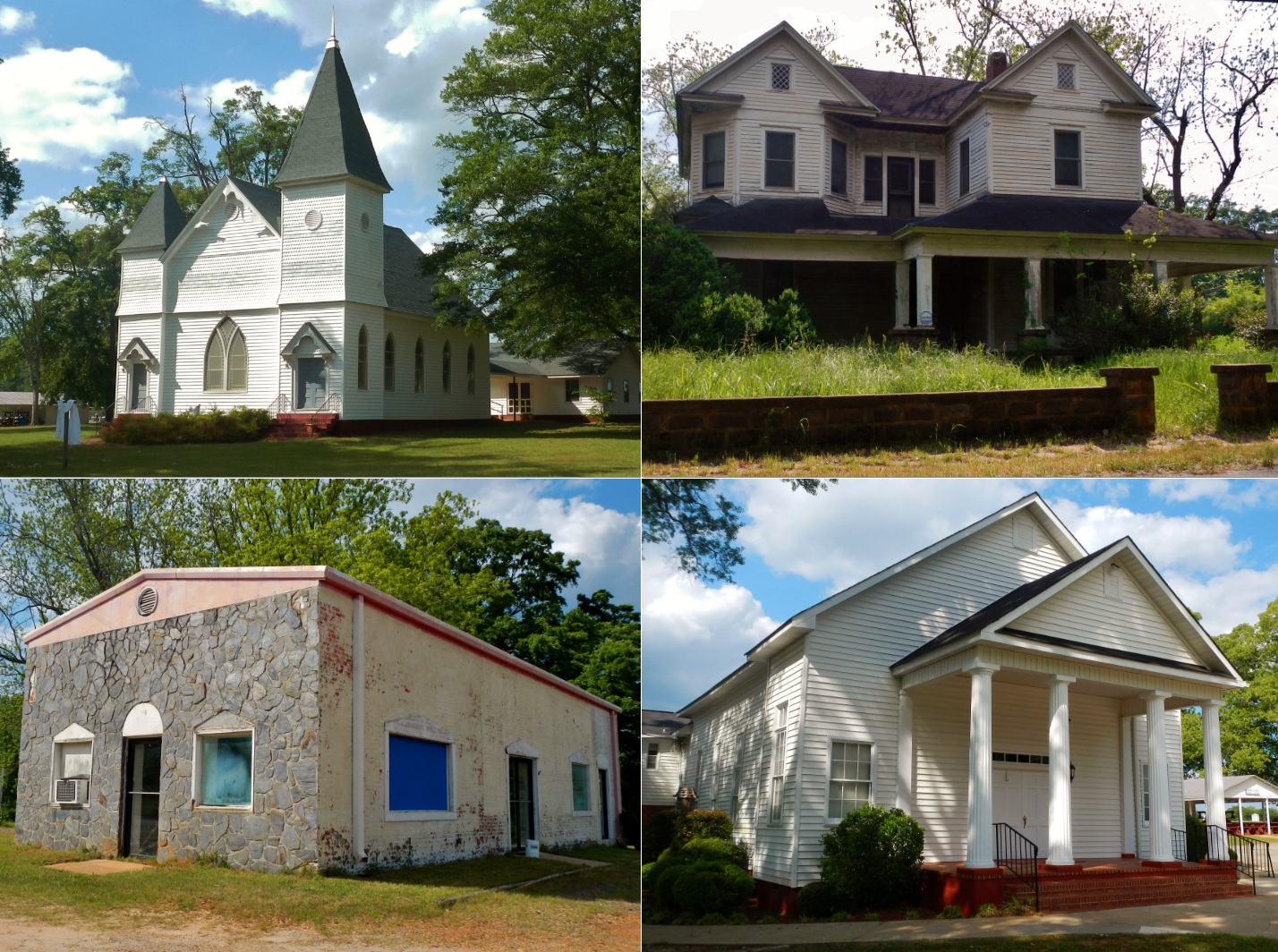

- Location in Heard County and the state of Georgia
- Coordinates: 33°13′46″N 84°56′32″W
- Country: United States
- State: Georgia
- Counties: Heard, Coweta

Area
  - Total: 0.89 sq mi (2.3 km^{2})
  - Land: 0.89 sq mi (2.3 km^{2})
  - Water: 0 sq mi (0.0 km^{2})
- Elevation: 750 ft (230 m)

Population (2000)
  - Total: 213
  - Density: 235/sq mi (90.8/km^{2})
- Time zone: UTC-5 (Eastern (EST))
  - Summer (DST): UTC-4 (EDT)
- FIPS code: 13-19672
- GNIS feature ID: 0312974

Corinth is an unincorporated community and former incorporated town in Coweta and Heard counties in the U.S. state of Georgia. The population was 213 at the 2000 census.

== History ==
The Georgia General Assembly incorporated the place in 1839 as the "Town of Corinth". The community's name is a transfer from Ancient Corinth, in Greece. A post office was established at Corinth in 1833, and remained in operation until 1914.

Corinth disincorporated on May 1, 2000.

== Geography ==
The community is located along Georgia State Route 100 in southeastern Heard and southwestern Coweta counties. GA-100 leads southeast 5 mi (8 km) to Hogansville and northwest 10 mi (16 km) to Franklin, the Heard County seat.

According to the United States Census Bureau, the community has a total area of 0.9 square miles (2.3 km^{2}), all land.

== Demographics ==
Historical population
| Census | Pop. | Note | %± |
|---|---|---|---|
| 1880 | 105 | | — |
| 1900 | 162 | | — |
| 1910 | 147 | | −9.3% |
| 1920 | 140 | | −4.8% |
| 1930 | 101 | | −27.9% |
| 1940 | 144 | | 42.6% |
| 1950 | 135 | | −6.2% |
| 1960 | 105 | | −22.2% |
| 1970 | 107 | | 1.9% |
| 1980 | 75 | | −29.9% |
| 1990 | 136 | | 81.3% |
| 2000 | 213 | | 56.6% |
U.S. Decennial Census

As of the census of 2000, there were 213 people, 78 households, and 60 families residing in the community. The population density was 235.2 inhabitants per square mile (90.8/km^{2}). There were 88 housing units at an average density of 97.2 per square mile (37.5/km^{2}). The racial makeup of the community was 95.31% White, 4.23% African American, 0.47% from other races. Hispanic or Latino of any race were 3.29% of the population.

There were 78 households, out of which 33.3% had children under the age of 18 living with them, 43.6% were married couples living together, 21.8% had a female householder with no husband present, and 21.8% were non-families. 19.2% of all households were made up of individuals, and 3.8% had someone living alone who was 65 years of age or older. The average household size was 2.73 and the average family size was 3.07.

In the community, the population was spread out, with 30.5% under the age of 18, 9.9% from 18 to 24, 27.2% from 25 to 44, 22.5% from 45 to 64, and 9.9% who were 65 years of age or older. The median age was 30 years. For every 100 females, there were 93.6 males. For every 100 females age 18 and over, there were 80.5 males.

The median income for a household in the community was $21,094, and the median income for a family was $20,500. Males had a median income of $24,844 versus $20,250 for females. The per capita income for the community was $11,824. About 25.9% of families and 29.5% of the population were below the poverty line, including 38.3% of those under the age of eighteen and 20.7% of those 65 or over.
