= Heard County High School =

Public high school in Franklin, Georgia, United States

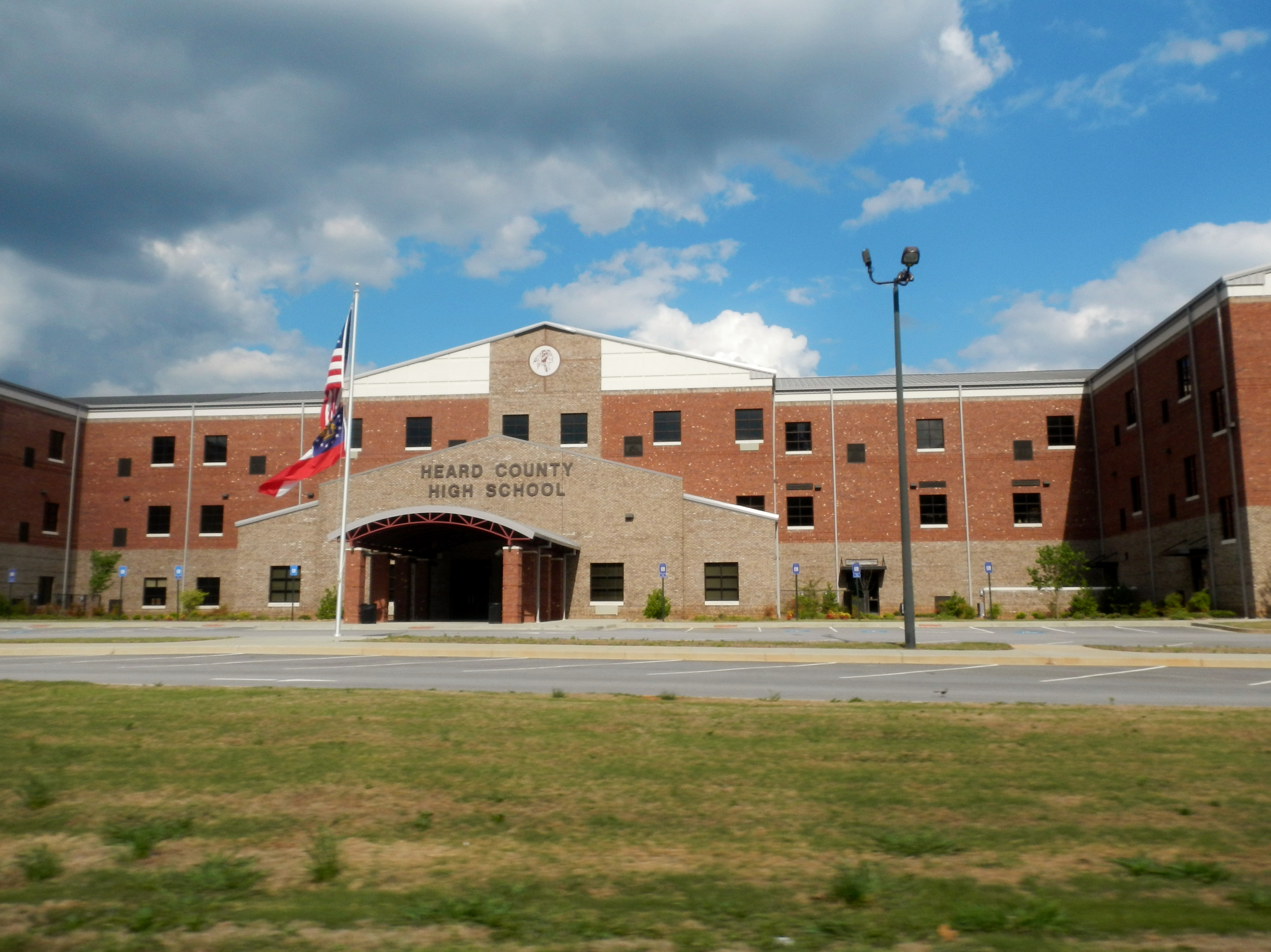

Location
- 545 Main Street; Franklin, Georgia 30217; United States; 33.27557°N 85.09332°W

Information
- School type: Public high school
- School district: Heard County School District
- Principal: John Wahl
- Teaching staff: 43.20 (on an FTE basis)
- Grades: 9-12
- Enrollment: 672 (2024–2025)
- Student to teacher ratio: 15.56
- Colors: Maroon and gray
- Athletics conference: Georgia High School Association
- Nickname: Braves
- Newspaper: The Warcry
- Website: https://hhs.heard.k12.ga.us/

Heard County High School is a public high school in Franklin, Georgia, United States, part of the Heard County School District. The school's mascot is the Brave.

== History ==
The school was originally known as Franklin High School when there were two high schools in the county. However, after Centralhatchee High School closed in 1954, it was renamed to Heard County High School. The school grounds originally consisted of a small music building, three classrooms, and an auditorium. However, at this time the school served ten grades and 150 students.

In the 1950s, when the district consolidated, many of Heard County High School's buildings were made of rock.

The current campus was completed in 2009, which added many electronic items such as interactive whiteboards and computer labs. The school also added an athletic complex, a new music facility, and in a later renovation, an agricultural building.

== Notable alumni ==
- Skyler Thomas, NFL safety for the Chicago Bears
- Emory Jones, NFL quarterback for the Atlanta Falconss<ref>https://www.espn.com/nfl/player/_/id/4360230/emory-jones
