= Franklin, Georgia =

- City
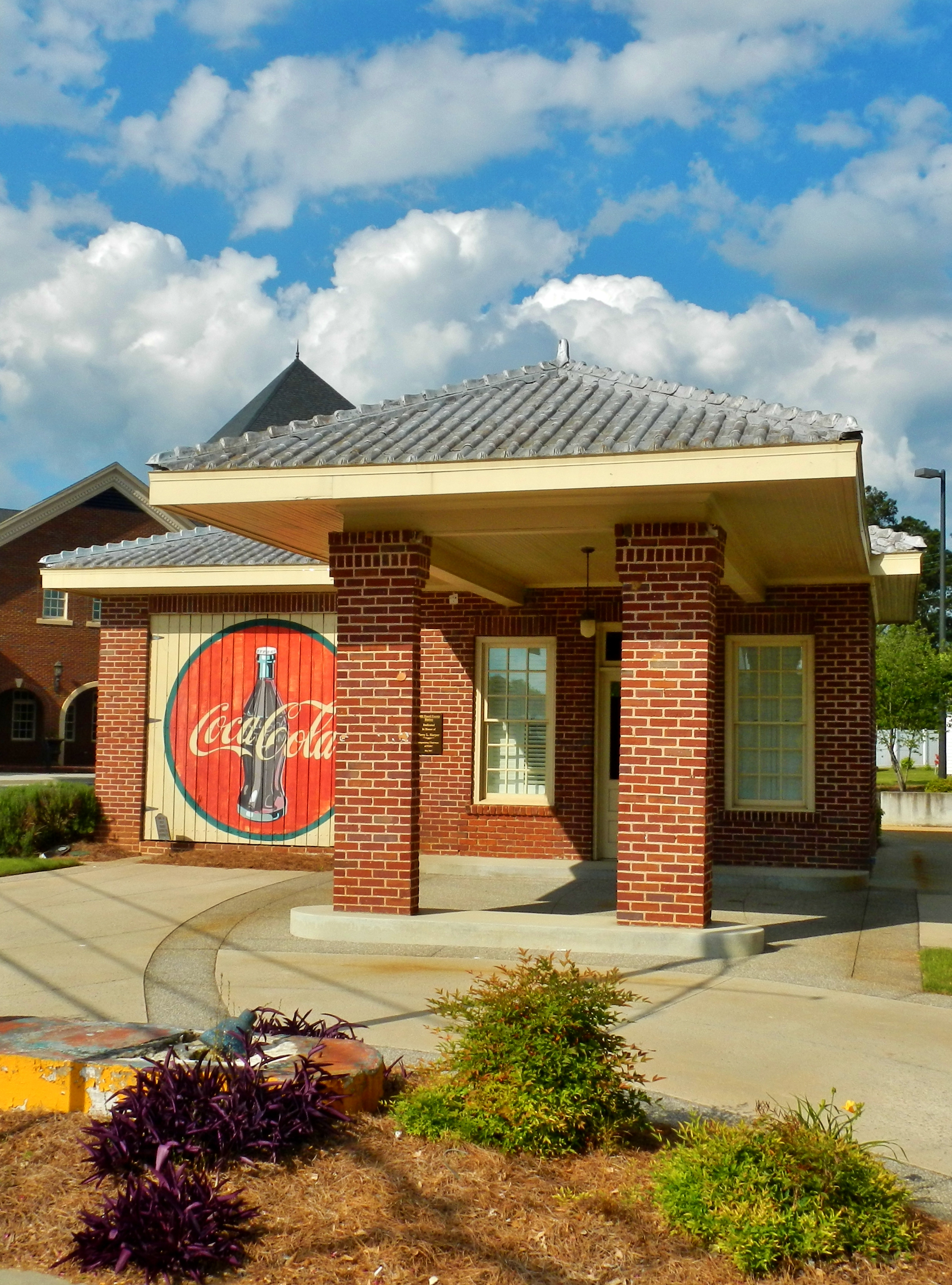
- The old Heard County gas station was built in 1938 and features a vintage, hand-painted Coca-Cola advertisement.

- Location in Heard County and the state of Georgia
- Coordinates: 33°16′47″N 85°5′54″W
- Country: United States
- State: Georgia
- County: Heard
- Named for: Benjamin Franklin

Government
  - Mayor: Joel Rogers

Area
  - Total: 3.35 sq mi (8.68 km^{2})
  - Land: 3.21 sq mi (8.31 km^{2})
  - Water: 0.14 sq mi (0.36 km^{2})
- Elevation: 663 ft (202 m)

Population (2020)
  - Total: 950
  - Density: 295.9/sq mi (114.26/km^{2})
- Time zone: UTC-5 (Eastern (EST))
  - Summer (DST): UTC-4 (EDT)
- ZIP code: 30217
- Area code: 706
- FIPS code: 13-31292
- GNIS feature ID: 0314347
- Website: www.franklingeorgia.com

Franklin is a city in Heard County, Georgia, United States. The population was 950 in 2020. Franklin is the county seat of Heard County. The city is named after Benjamin Franklin.

== History ==
Franklin was settled in 1770, and was designated seat of the newly formed Heard County in 1831. The town was hit by a tornado just before midnight on March 25, 2021, with multiple areas in downtown being heavily damaged with the most severe damage being rated high-end EF2. The tornado later became violent and hit nearby Newnan, Georgia to the east at EF4 strength, indirectly killing one person.

== Geography ==
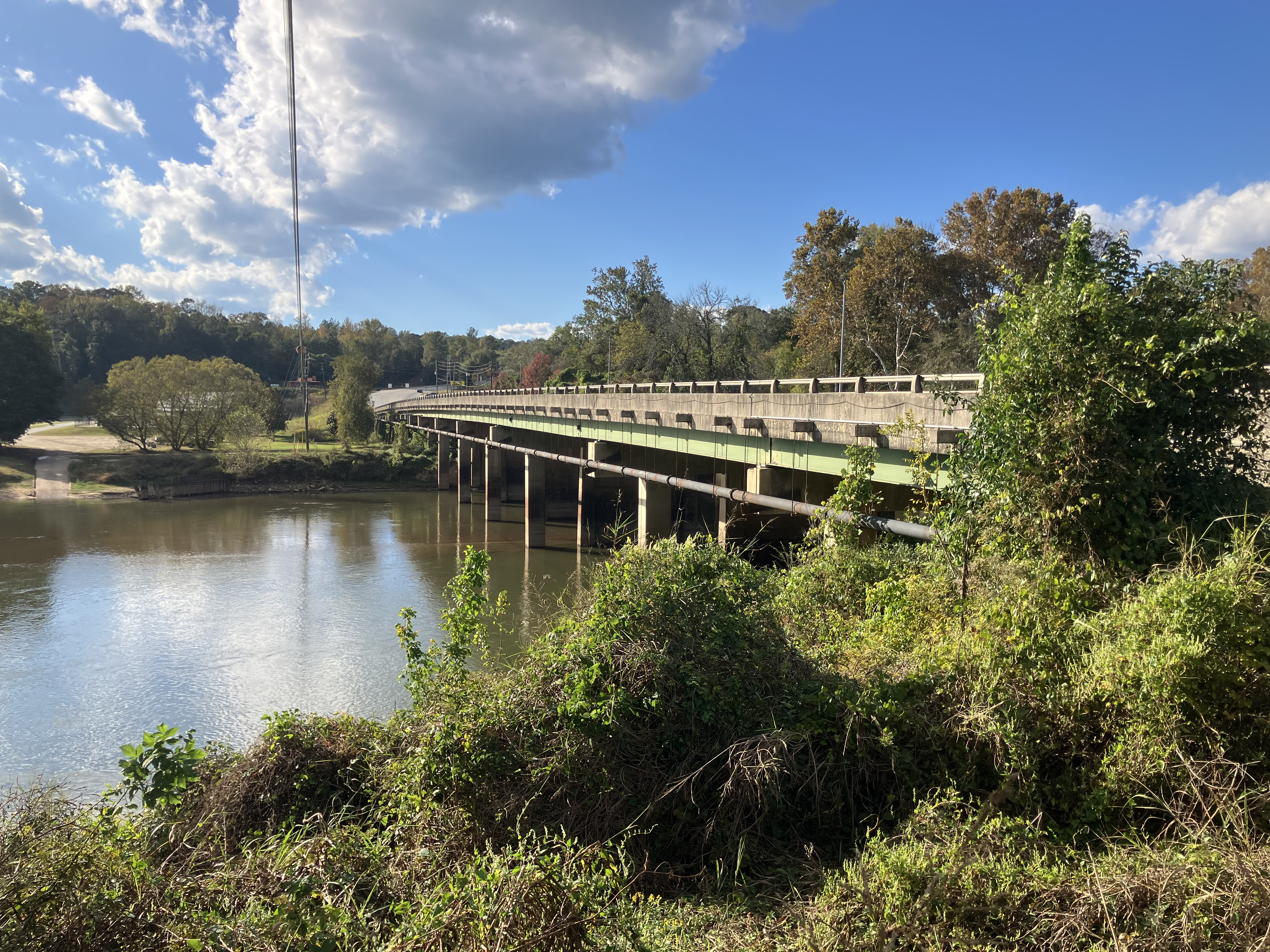
Pleasant Theodore McCutchen Sr. Bridge carrying Georgia State Routes 34 and 100 over the Chattahoochee River

Franklin is located in central Heard County at 33°16′47″N 85°05′54″W, along the Chattahoochee River. U.S. Route 27 passes through the east side of the city on a bypass, leading north 23 miles (37 km) to Carrollton and south 19 miles (31 km) to LaGrange. Georgia State Route 34 passes through the center of Franklin, leading northeast 20 miles (32 km) to Newnan and southwest 12 miles (19 km) to the Alabama border. Georgia State Route 100 joins SR 34 for part of its path through Franklin, but leads northwest 14 miles (23 km) to Ephesus and southeast 14 miles to Hogansville.

According to the United States Census Bureau, Franklin has a total area of 3.5 square miles (9.0 km^{2}), of which 3.4 square miles (8.7 km^{2}) are land and 0.2 square miles (0.4 km^{2}), or 4.00%, are water.

== Demographics ==
Historical population
| Census | Pop. | Note | %± |
|---|---|---|---|
| 1880 | 269 | | — |
| 1890 | 250 | | −7.1% |
| 1900 | 218 | | −12.8% |
| 1910 | 340 | | 56.0% |
| 1920 | 317 | | −6.8% |
| 1930 | 312 | | −1.6% |
| 1940 | 390 | | 25.0% |
| 1950 | 425 | | 9.0% |
| 1960 | 603 | | 41.9% |
| 1970 | 749 | | 24.2% |
| 1980 | 711 | | −5.1% |
| 1990 | 876 | | 23.2% |
| 2000 | 902 | | 3.0% |
| 2010 | 993 | | 10.1% |
| 2020 | 950 | | −4.3% |
U.S. Decennial Census

Franklin racial composition as of 2020
| Race | Num. | Perc. |
|---|---|---|
| White (non-Hispanic) | 625 | 65.79% |
| Black or African American (non-Hispanic) | 217 | 22.84% |
| Native American | 3 | 0.32% |
| Asian | 20 | 2.11% |
| Other/Mixed | 64 | 6.74% |
| Hispanic or Latino | 21 | 2.21% |

As of the 2020 United States census, there were 950 people, 421 households, and 215 families residing in the city.

== Education ==
=== Heard County School District ===
The Heard County School District holds pre-school to grade twelve, and consists of three elementary schools, a middle school, and a high school (Heard County High School). The district has 132 full-time teachers and over 2,278 students.

== Old Heard County Jail ==
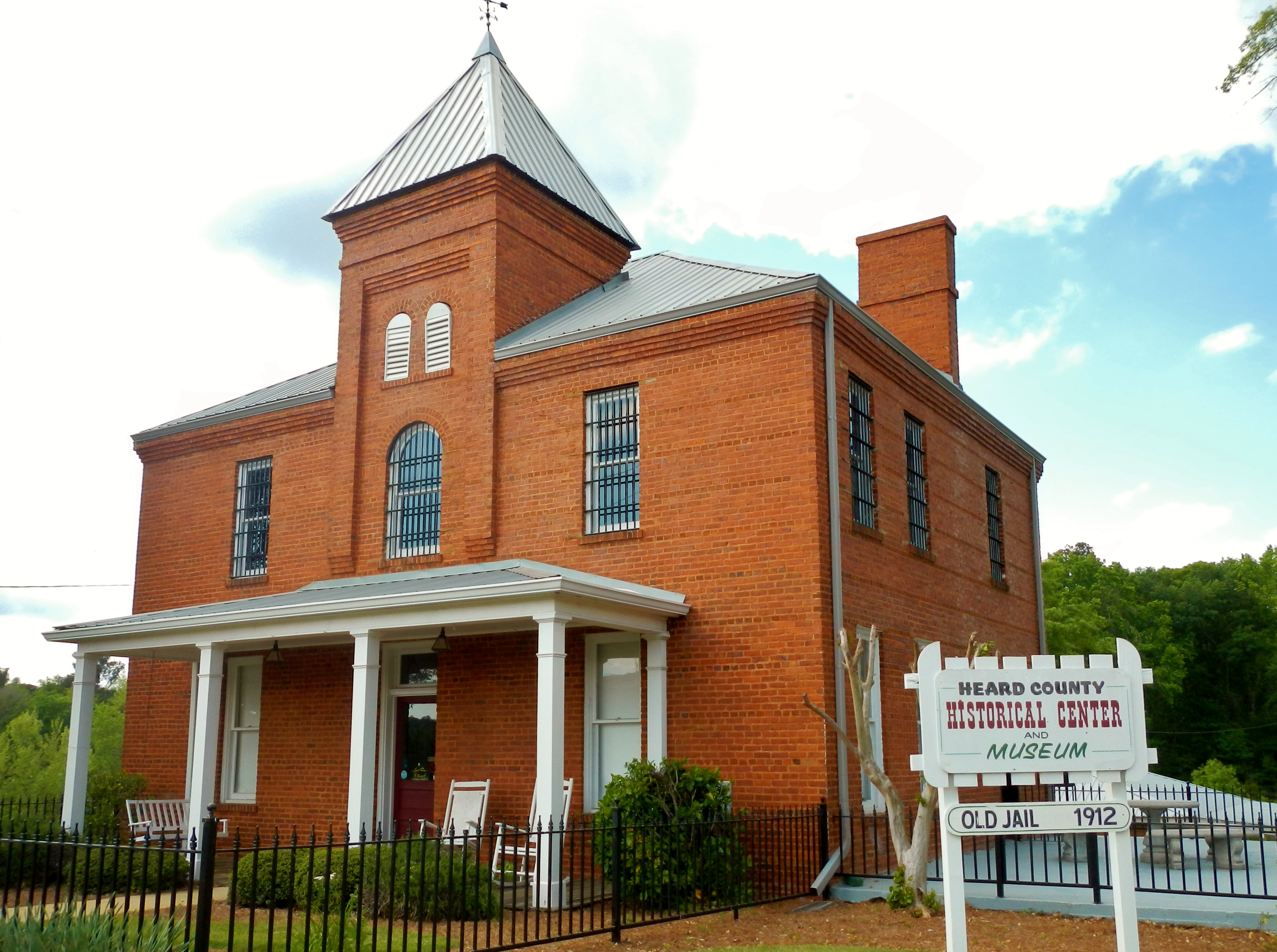
Old Heard County Jail in 2012

Pauly Jail Company of Alabama built the jail in 1912 for $7,500, using plans by Manly Jail Works of Dalton, Georgia. It replaced an older jail built in 1880 that had become unfit. The jail housed up to 16 prisoners upstairs. The Heard County Sheriff (there were eight sheriffs from 1912 to 1964) and his family lived downstairs. In the 1930s, two prisoners cut the window bars and escaped. Death row prisoners were held here, but the jail's gallows were never used. In 1964, a new county jail opened on the Franklin Square and the old jail closed.

The jail was listed on the National Register of Historic Places on January 27, 1981. In 1987 it was completely restored by the Heard County Historical Society. It now serves as a museum and historical center.

== Gallery ==
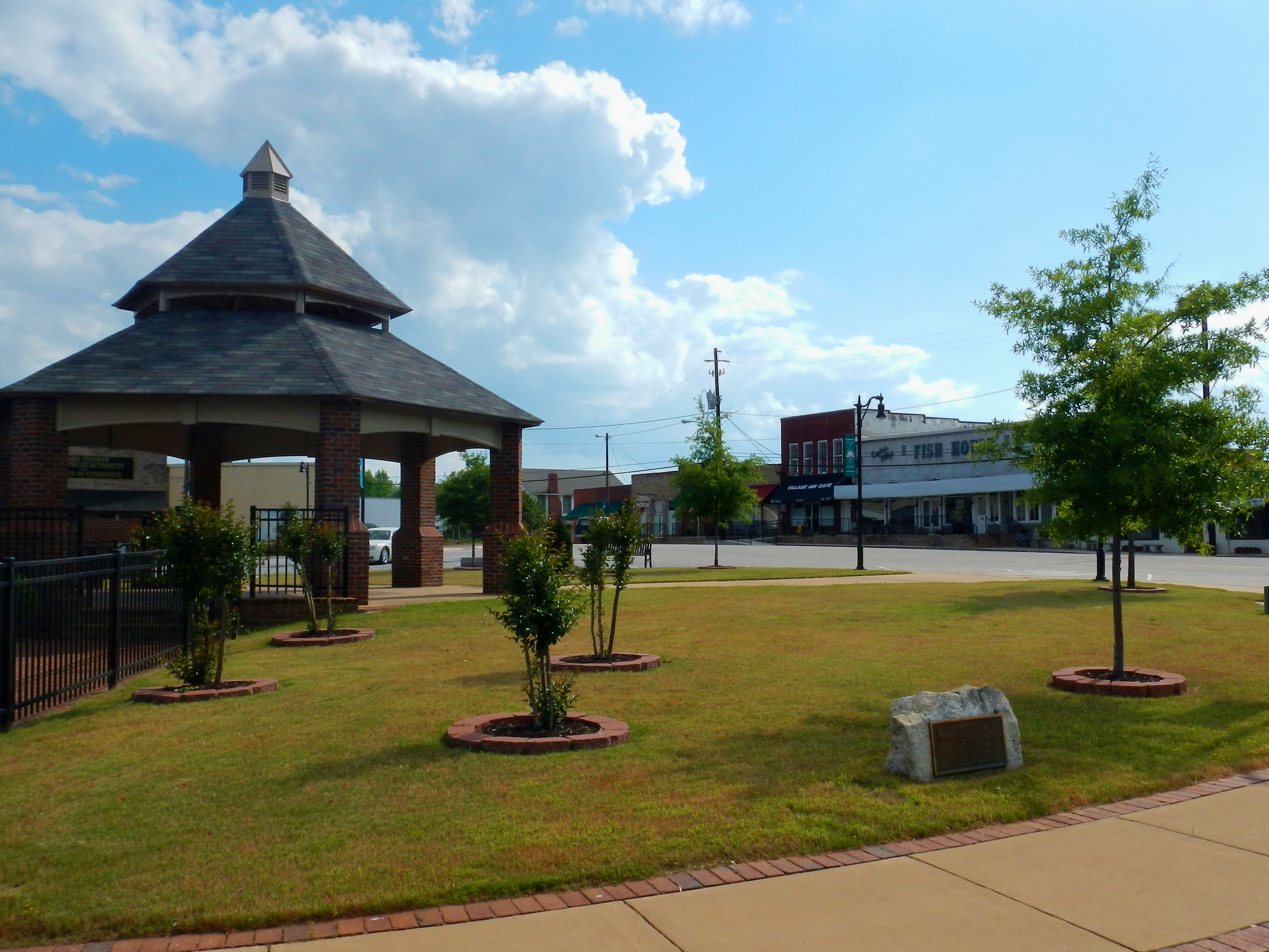
Franklin Court Square

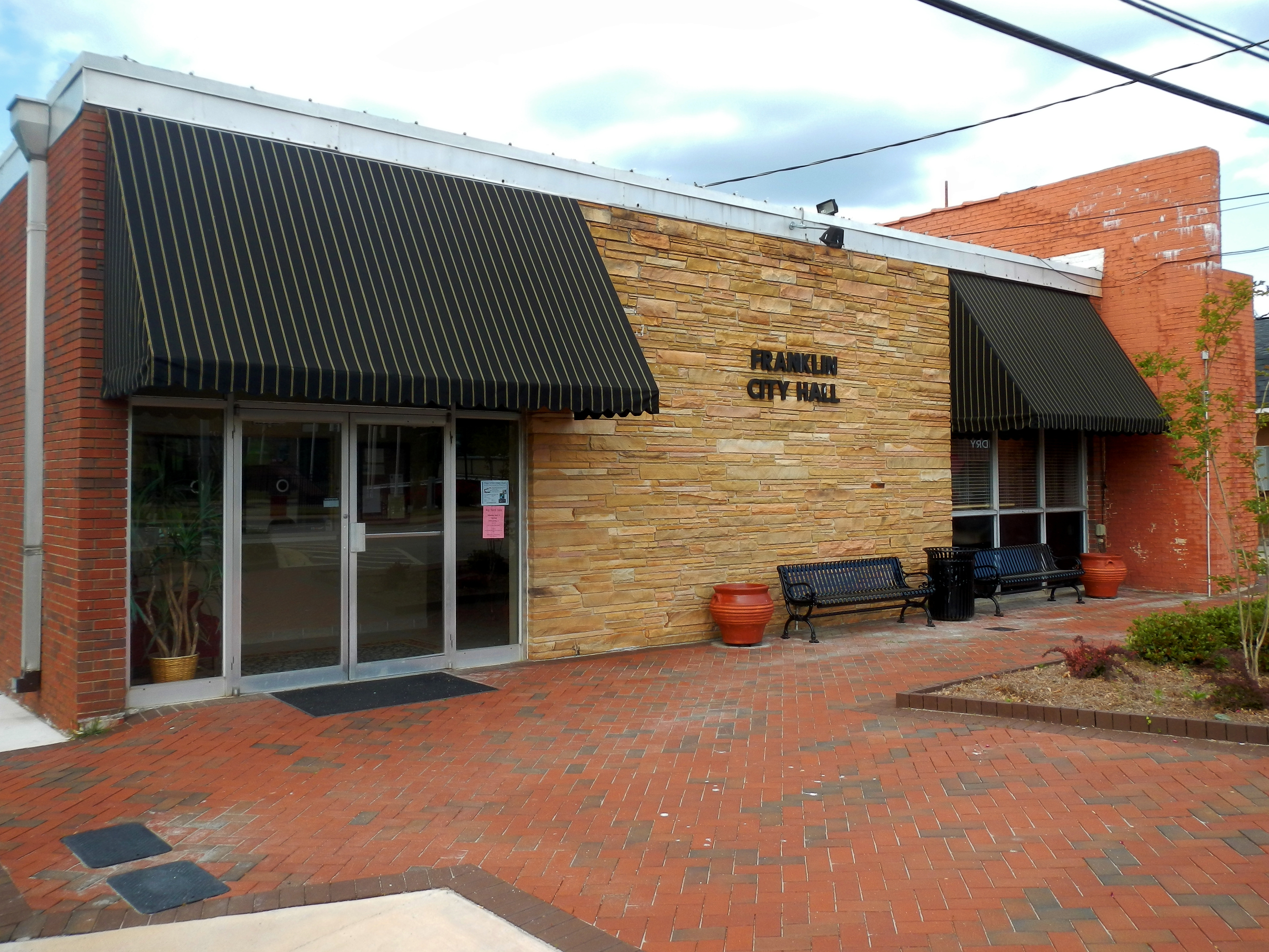
Franklin City Hall

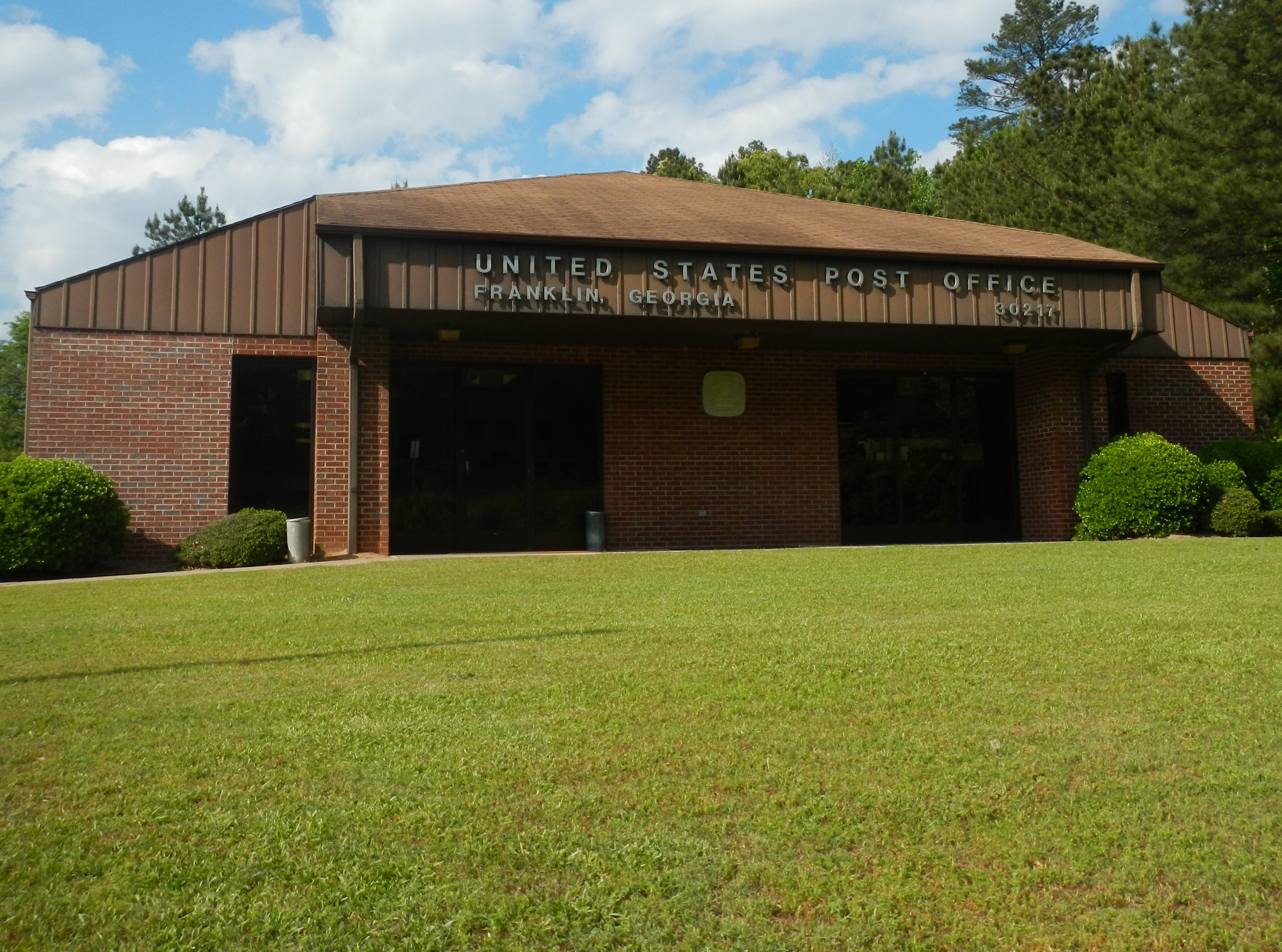
Franklin Post Office (ZIP code: 30217)

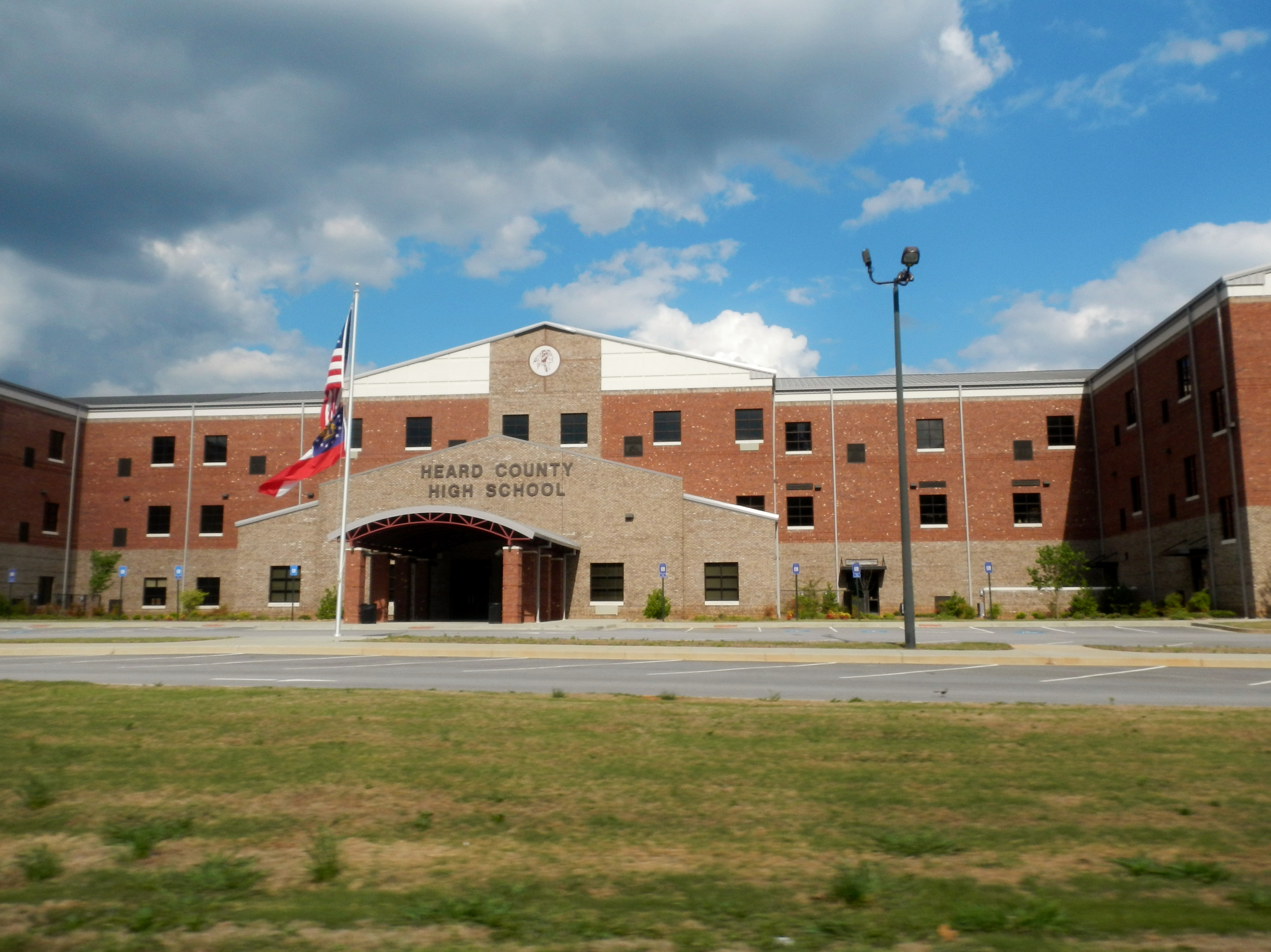
Heard County Comprehensive High School

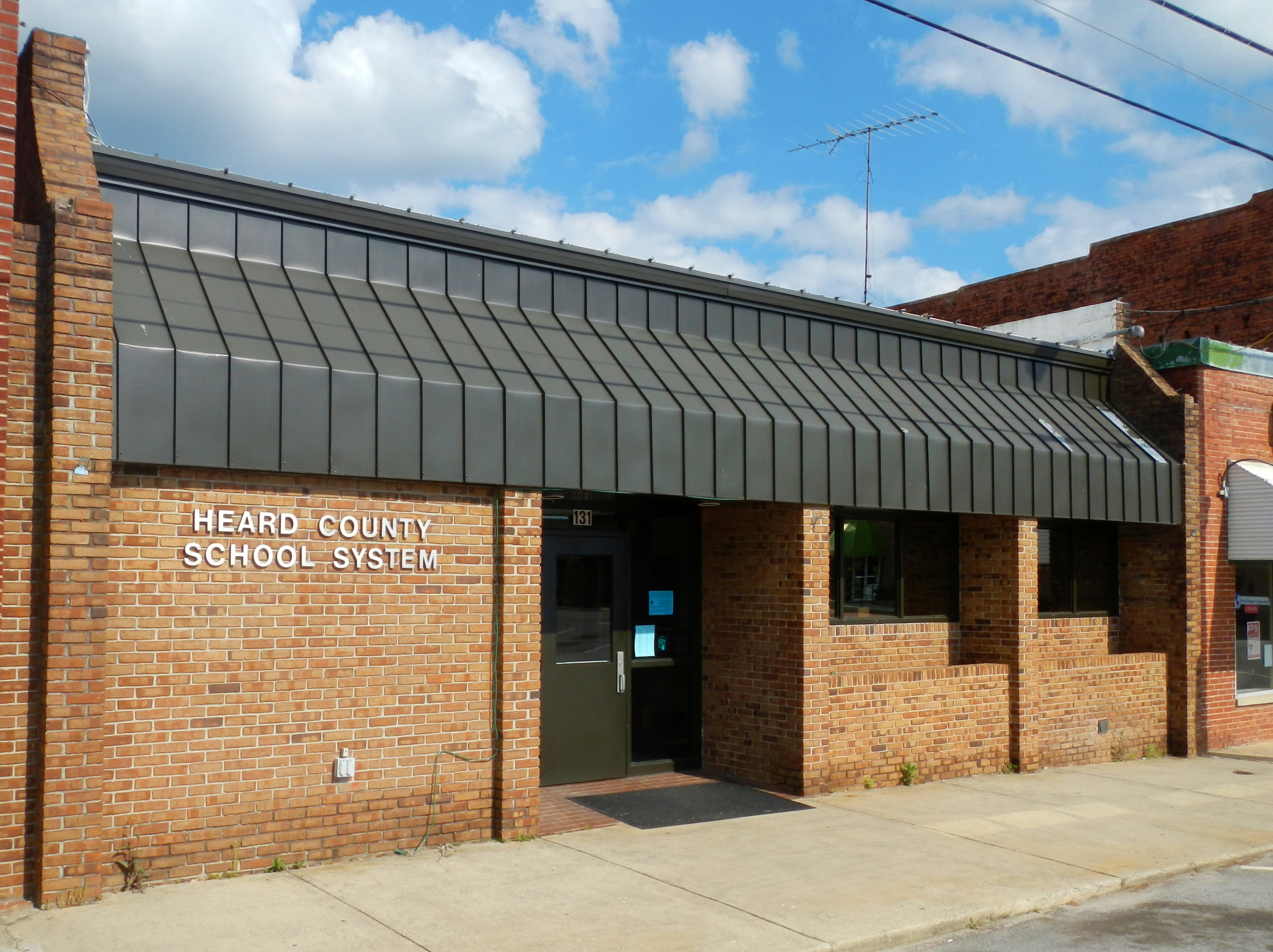
Heard County School System
