= Beloit =

Beloit may refer to

== Places in the United States ==
- Beloit, Alabama
- Beloit, Georgia
- Beloit, Iowa
- Beloit, Kansas
- Beloit, Ohio
- Beloit, Wisconsin
- Beloit (town), Wisconsin, adjacent to the city of Beloit
- Beloit Township, Mitchell County, Kansas
- South Beloit, Illinois

== Other uses ==
- Beloit (corporation), a former American paper machine and other paper making equipment supplier
- Beloit College, located in Beloit, Wisconsin
- USS Beloit (LCS-29), laid down in 2020
