= Chattahoochee (disambiguation) =

The Chattahoochee River is a river in the Southeastern United States.

Chattahoochee may also refer to:

== Places ==
- Chattahoochee, Florida, a town in Gadsden County, Florida
- Chattahoochee County, Georgia, a county in central Georgia
- Chattahoochee Plantation, Georgia, a community in Cobb County, Georgia
- Chattahoochee National Forest, part of the Chattahoochee-Oconee National Forest in northern Georgia
- Whittier Mill Village, a neighborhood of Atlanta whose original name was Chattahoochee

== Entertainment ==
- Chattahoochee (film), a 1989 film starring Gary Oldman and Dennis Hopper set at the Florida State Hospital
- "Chattahoochee" (song), a 1993 song by Alan Jackson named for the Chattahoochee River
- "Chattahoochee" (song), a 2013 song by Dimitri Vegas & Like Mike for the Tomorrowland 2013 Anthem
- "Chattahoochee", a song by 38 Special on their album Rock & Roll Strategy, named for the Florida State Hospital

== Other ==
- Chattahoochee, a metonym for the Florida State Hospital located in Chattahoochee, Florida
- Chattahoochee High School, a high school in Johns Creek, Georgia
