= List of disincorporated municipalities in Georgia =

This is the list of disincorporated cities and towns in the U. S. state of Georgia.

== 1965 ==
- North Atlanta

== 1978 ==
- Mountain View (also known as Rough and Ready)

== 1995 ==
On July 1, 1995, the Georgia General Assembly disincorporated multiple cities, because they did not have an active government and offer at least three municipal services.

- Alvaton
- Appling
- Barney
- Beloit
- Bonaire
- Chattahoochee Plantation
- Elizabeth
- Grooverville
- Mountville
- Omaha
- The Rock
- Russell

== 1999 ==
- Mineral Bluff

== 2000 ==
- Bibb City
- Corinth

== 2001 ==
- Lithia Springs

== Others ==
- Naylor (1990s)
- Center (ca. 2004)
- Coleman (2007)
- Bold Springs (date unknown)
