= Sandtown =

Sandtown may refer to:

- Sandtown, Delaware, an unincorporated community in Kent County, Delaware, USA
- Sandtown, Georgia, a neighborhood in Atlanta, Georgia, USA
- Sandtown, New Jersey, an unincorporated community in Southampton Township, New Jersey, USA
- Sandtown-Winchester, Baltimore, a neighborhood in Baltimore, Maryland, USA
- Sandtown, Ontario, a neighborhood in South Stormont, Ontario, Canada
