= Marcia Anderson =

United States Army general

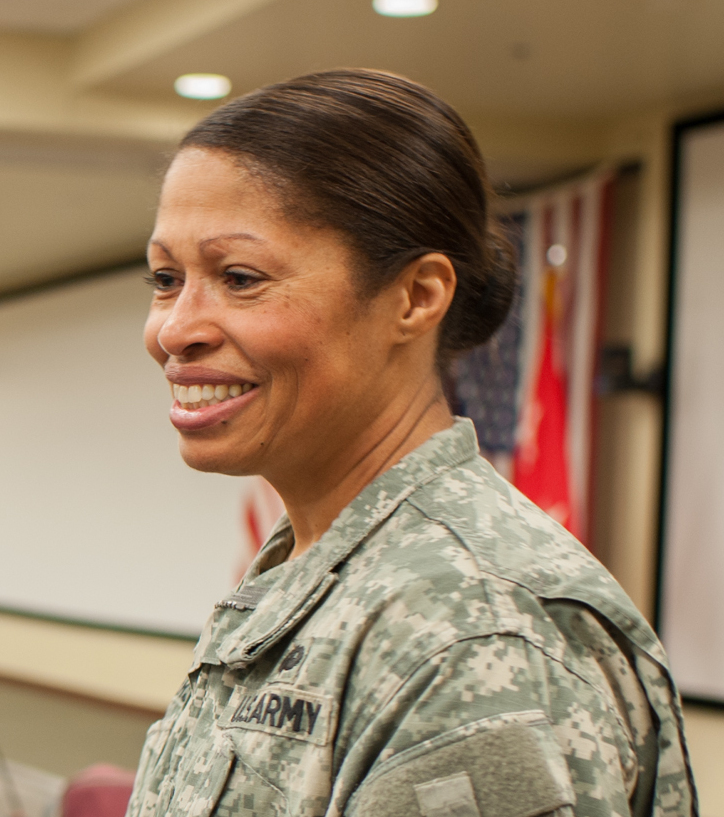
- Anderson at Fort Bragg in 2014
- Born: 1957 (age 68–69); Beloit, Wisconsin
- Military career
- Allegiance: United States
- Branch: United States Army
- Service years: 1976–2016
- Rank: Major General
- Awards: Army Distinguished Service Medal; Legion of Merit (3); Army Commendation Medal; Achievement Medal

Marcia Carol Martin Anderson (née Mahan; born 1957) is a retired senior officer of the United States Army Reserve. She was the first African-American woman to become a major general in the United States Army Reserve.

== Early life ==
Anderson was born in Beloit, Wisconsin, and finished school in St. Louis, Missouri. Her father served in the U.S. Army Air Corps during World War II, working as a truck driver. Anderson was commissioned into the U.S. Army through the ROTC program at Creighton University.

== Career ==
As a civilian, Anderson served as Clerk of Court for the United States Bankruptcy Court for the Western District of Wisconsin.

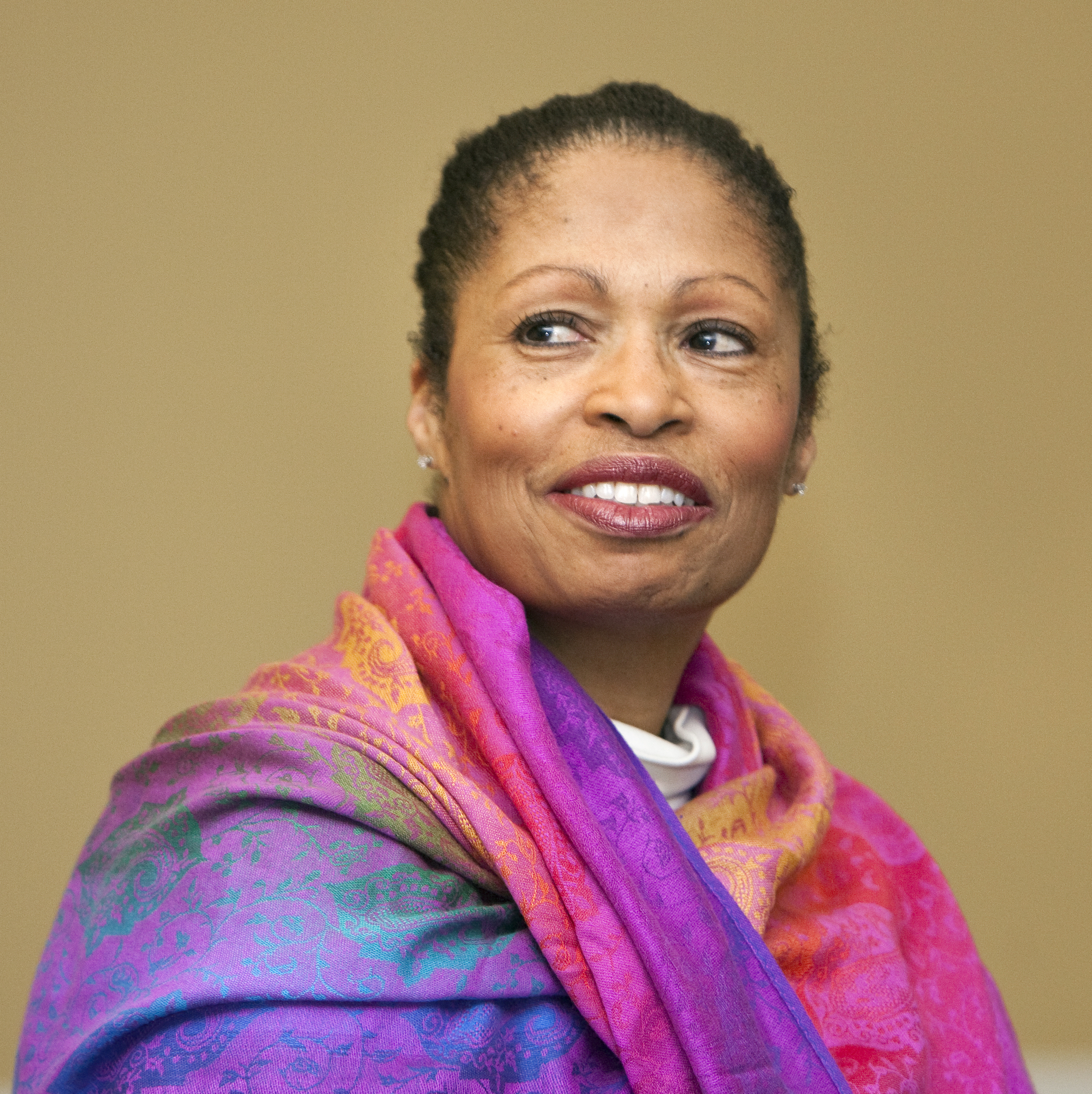
Anderson in 2018

Anderson is a 1979 graduate of Creighton University in Omaha, Nebraska, a 1986 graduate of Rutgers School of Law–Newark in New Jersey, and a 2003 graduate of the United States Army War College. She is married to Amos Charles Anderson. She originally signed up for the Reserve Officers' Training Corps at Creighton University because she needed a science credit.

In 2011, Anderson became the first African-American woman to achieve the federally recognized rank of major general in the US Army, US Army Reserve and the US Army National Guard.

Anderson retired from the reserve army in 2016 and from her civilian job in 2019. She has since been awarded the Maj. Gen. James Earl Rudder Medal and been inducted into the Army Women's Foundation Hall of Fame.

Since 2021, she has served as a member of the Green Bay Packers Executive Committee. In 2024 she was chosen to be the ship sponsor for the USS Beloit.

== Personal life ==
Anderson lives in Wisconsin with her husband Amos Charles Anderson; the couple have no children of their own. An uncle, the Jesuit priest Joseph A. Brown, was head of the Africana department at Southern Illinois University. She is Catholic.

== Awards ==
Anderson's military awards and decorations include the Army Distinguished Service Medal, Legion of Merit with two oak leaf clusters, the Meritorious Service Medal with three oak leaf clusters, the Army Commendation Medal, the Army Achievement Medal, the Parachutist Badge, and the Physical Fitness Badge.
