= Utoy Cemetery =

Historic cemetery in Atlanta, Georgia, US

- U.S. National Register of Historic Places
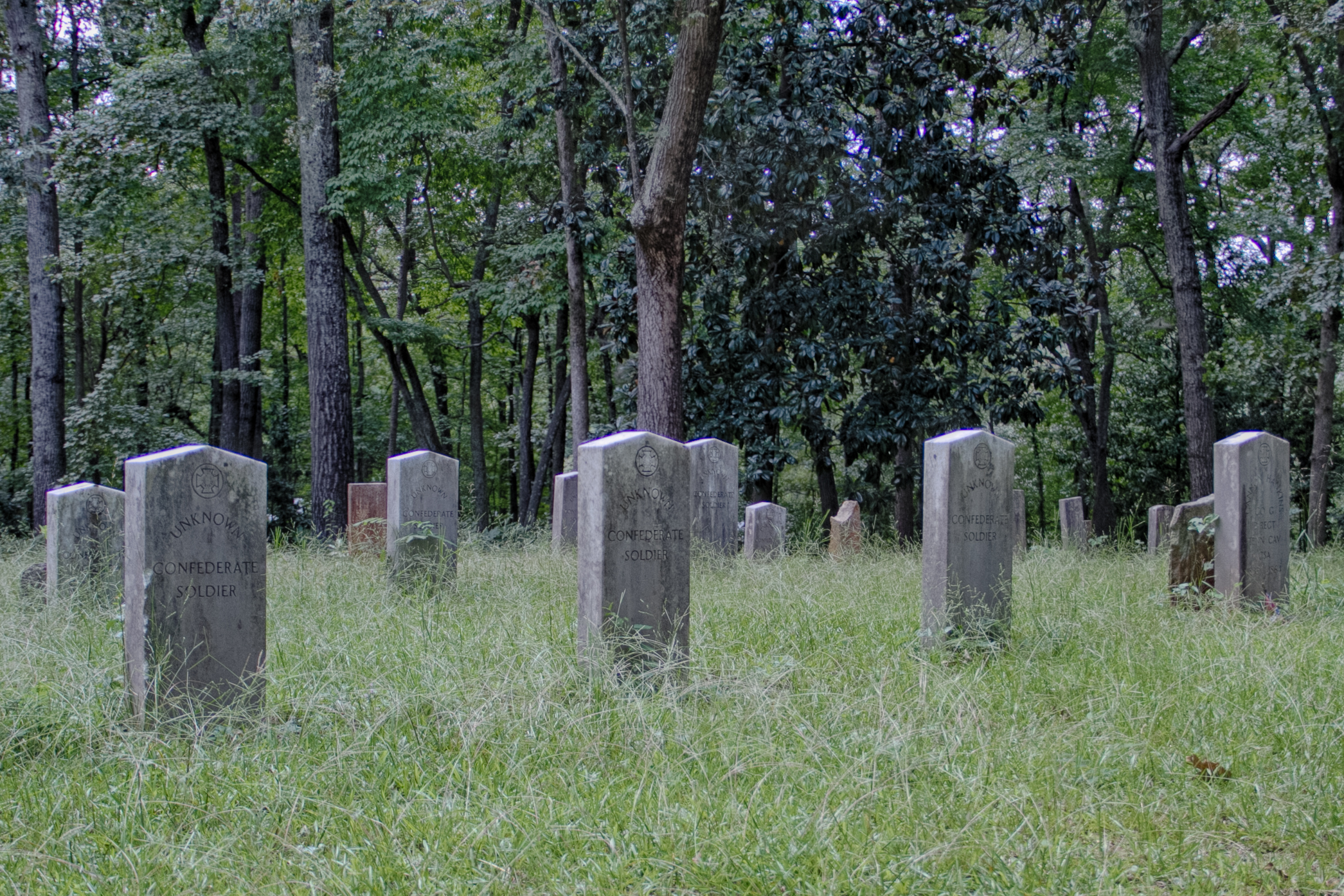

- Location within Metro Atlanta
- Location: Atlanta, Georgia
- Coordinates: 33°42′57″N 84°27′02″W
- NRHP reference No.: 15000025

Utoy Cemetery is one of the oldest cemeteries within the current city limits of Atlanta in the U.S. state of Georgia and is listed on the National Register of Historic Places. Located near the intersection of Venetian Drive SW and Cahaba Drive SW in the Venetian Hills neighborhood in southwest Atlanta, it was used for burials as early as 1828.

== See also ==
- Battle of Utoy Creek
- Utoy, Georgia
