= Venetian Hills =

Coordinates: 33.719°N 84.440°W

Venetian Hills, Atlanta, Georgia
- CDP
- Interactive map of Venetian Hills, Atlanta, Georgia
- Country: United States
- State: Georgia
- County: Fulton

Population (2010)
  - Total: 3,790
- ZIP code(s): 30311
- Area code: 404

Venetian Hills is an official neighborhood in southwest Atlanta, in the U.S. state of Georgia. Its 2010 population was 3,790. The neighborhood was established in the late 1950s.

It is bordered:

- on the north by Cascade Avenue/Road SW, Avon Avenue SW, and the Bush Mountain neighborhood
- on the north and east by Epworth St. and the Oakland City neighborhood
- on the south and east by Fort McPherson
- on the south by Campbellton Road and the neighborhoods of Pomona Park and Campbellton Road
- on the west by Centra Villa Drive SW and the Adams Park neighborhood

== Places of Interest ==
- One of Atlanta's oldest cemeteries, Utoy Cemetery (1828), is located in the neighborhood. Atlanta's first physician is buried here.
- In 2024, Rsye Interactive announced they will be opening a $25 million creative hub in the neighborhood. The mixed-use development will repurpose the shuttered Arkwright Elementary School which closed in 2004 due to declining enrollment.
