= USS Beloit =

Littoral combat ship of the United States Navy

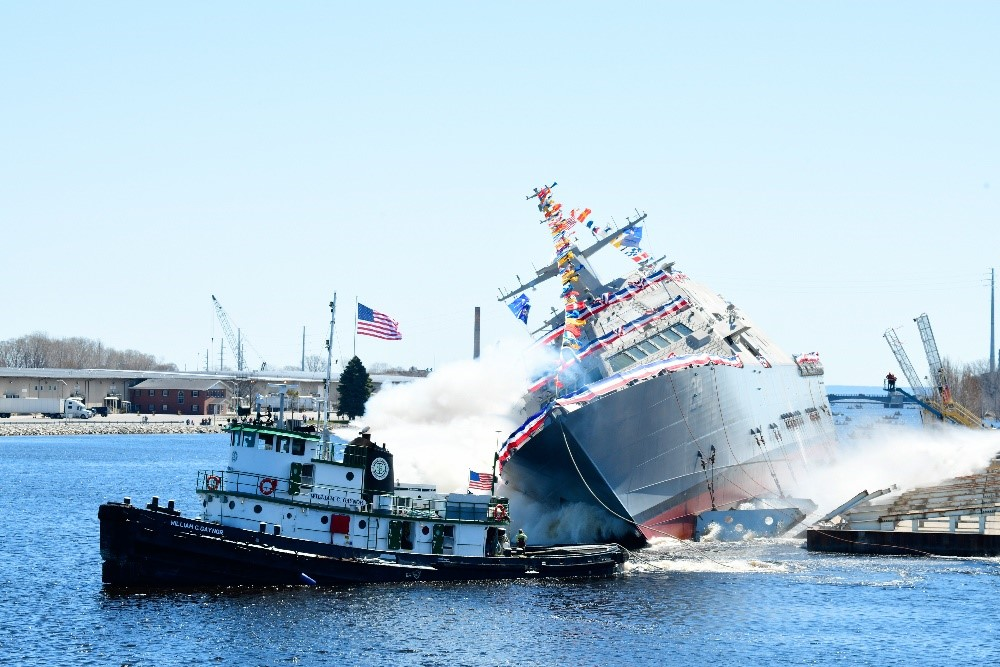
- USS Beloit launched in Marinette, Wisconsin

History

United States
- Name: Beloit
- Namesake: Beloit
- Awarded: 18 September 2018
- Builder: Marinette Marine
- Laid down: 22 July 2020
- Launched: 7 May 2022
- Sponsored by: MG Marcia Anderson (USAR, Ret.)
- Christened: 7 May 2022
- Commissioned: 23 November 2024
- Home port: Mayport
- Identification: Hull number: LCS-29
- Motto: Forward for Freedom
- Status: In service
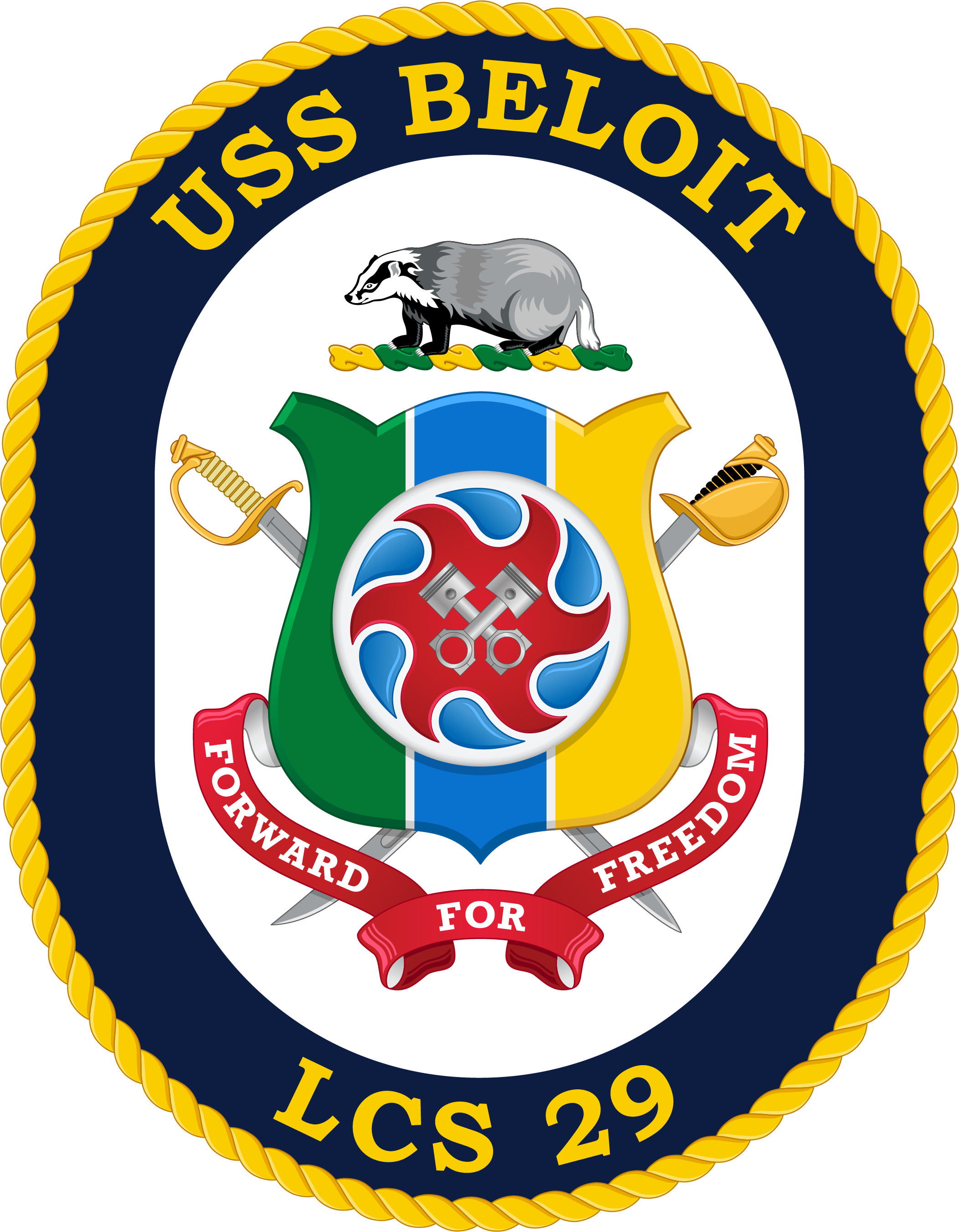
- Badge

General characteristics
- Class & type: Freedom-class littoral combat ship
- Displacement: 3,410 metric tons (3,760 short tons) full load
- Length: 388 ft (118 m)
- Beam: 58 ft (18 m)
- Draft: 14 ft (4.3 m)
- Propulsion: 2 Rolls-Royce MT30 36 MW gas turbines, 2 Colt-Pielstick diesel engines, 4 Rolls-Royce waterjets
- Speed: 45 knots (83 km/h; 52 mph) (sea state 3)
- Range: 3,500 nmi (6,500 km; 4,000 mi) at 18 knots (33 km/h; 21 mph)
- Endurance: 21 days (504 hours)
- Boats & landing craft carried: 11 m RHIB, 40 ft (12 m) high-speed boats
- Complement: 9 officers, 41 enlisted
- Armament: BAE Systems Mk 110 57 mm gun; RIM-116 Rolling Airframe Missiles; Mark 50 torpedo
- Aircraft carried: 2 MH-60R/S Seahawks; MQ-8 Fire Scout
- Notes: Electrical power is provided by 4 Isotta Fraschini V1708 diesel engines with Hitzinger generator units rated at 800 kW each.

USS Beloit (LCS-29) is a Freedom-class littoral combat ship of the United States Navy. She is the first commissioned ship in naval service named after Beloit, Wisconsin. This honors the contributions Beloit has made to the US Navy, especially the engines built in its Fairbanks Morse plant, including USS Beloit's own powerplant.

== Design ==
In 2002, the US Navy initiated a program to develop the first of a fleet of littoral combat ships. The Navy initially ordered two monohull ships from Lockheed Martin, which became known as the Freedom-class littoral combat ships after the first ship of the class, USS Freedom. Odd-numbered U.S. Navy littoral combat ships are built using the Freedom-class monohull design, while even-numbered ships are based on a competing design, the trimaran hull Independence-class littoral combat ship from General Dynamics. The initial order of littoral combat ships involved a total of four ships, including two of the Freedom-class design. Beloit is the fifteenth Freedom-class littoral combat ship to be built.

== Construction and career ==
Marinette Marine was awarded the contract to build Beloit on 18 September 2018. She was christened and launched on 7 May 2022 at the shipyard in Marinette, Wisconsin. The ship's sponsor is Beloit-born Major General Marcia Anderson, (USAR, Ret.). Now retired, she was the first African-American woman to reach the rank of Major General in the US Army, US Army Reserve and the US Army National Guard.

Beloit successfully completed her acceptance trials in August 2024 and was commissioned in Milwaukee, Wisconsin on 23 November 2024.
