= Mountain View, Georgia =

Mountain View, Georgia Rough and Ready, Georgia
- Unincorporated community
- Former US Post Office, Mountain View, 2011

- Location within Georgia Location within the United States
- Coordinates: 33°38′30.4″N 84°23′24.7″W
- Country: United States
- State: Georgia
- County: Clayton
- Time zone: UTC-5 (Eastern (EST))
  - Summer (DST): UTC-4 (EDT)
- ZIP code(s): 30354
- Area code(s): 404
- GNIS feature ID: 319083
- Major airport: ATL

Mountain View (also known as Rough and Ready) is an unincorporated community in northwest Clayton County, Georgia, United States. The community is bounded on the east and south by Forest Park, on the north by the Fulton County line, and on the west by the Hartsfield-Jackson Atlanta International Airport.

== History ==
Mountain View was originally named Rough and Ready for the Rough and Ready Tavern or Bagley House, a stagecoach stop on the line from Macon to upper Georgia. It was later the site of the first railroad station south of Atlanta on the Macon and Western Railroad, 13 miles from the terminus at East Point.

=== American Civil War ===
The Rough and Ready Tavern served as a temporary headquarters for Confederate Lieutenant-General William J. Hardee during the Atlanta campaign (1864).

=== Twentieth Century ===
Its name was changed when it was incorporated as a city in 1956. The name "Mountain View" refers to the fact that, on a clear day, one can see Stone Mountain 20 miles to the east. The slogan, "Gateway to Clayton County," was featured on the city seal.

Mountain View was a city from 1956 to January 1978, when the Georgia General Assembly voted to repeal the city charter. A five-member delegation of Clayton County legislators proposed a bill to abolish the city in order to clean up corruption in the city government. During his four terms in office (1972-1977) Mayor Ray King, though popular with his constituents, was charged with bribery, nepotism, conspiracy, assault, and violating the city charter by accepting an illegal salary. Rather than reform the city leadership, Clayton County sought to dissolve Mountain View entirely. State Representative Rudolph Johnson of Morrow, chair of the delegation said, "They've had controversy out there for 20 years. It's an accumulation of things, really."

In 1972, (then) Governor Jimmy Carter suspended Mountain View's police powers for several months during an investigation into an alleged speed trap on I-75. Though no wrongdoing was confirmed, the allegations contributed to Mountain View's bad publicity. Along with the city's controversial 24-hour sales of beer and wine in an otherwise dry county, its reputation for public drunkenness and fighting, and a notorious mayor, the legislative delegation determined the city to be a "blight on Clayton County."

However, long before Mountain View was formally dissolved, the City of Atlanta Department of Aviation actively acquired properties and assisted in relocation of the residential population due to noise impacts from the nearby runways. In 1978, sound expert Dr. Clifford Bragdon called Mountain View the "most noise-impacted city in the U.S. or Europe." Despite the constant roar of jet engines, many residents did not want to leave and some homes were taken by eminent domain. Past population estimates were between 2,100 and 3,000 persons. The current population is unknown, but many of Mountain View's original businesses remain.

== Economy ==
Plans are on the drawing board for economic redevelopment the community, but the plans call for no residential population due to the noise from the takeoffs and landings at the Airport.

== Education ==
All areas in the county are zoned to Clayton County Public Schools.

== In popular culture ==
- Mitchell, Margaret. Gone with the Wind. This novel mentions Rough and Ready. The people of Atlanta were evacuated to Rough and Ready on the Macon and Western Railroad for further transport south.

== See also ==
- List of disincorporated cities in Georgia
