= Chattahoochee Plantation, Georgia =

Chattahoochee Plantation
- Unincorporated community
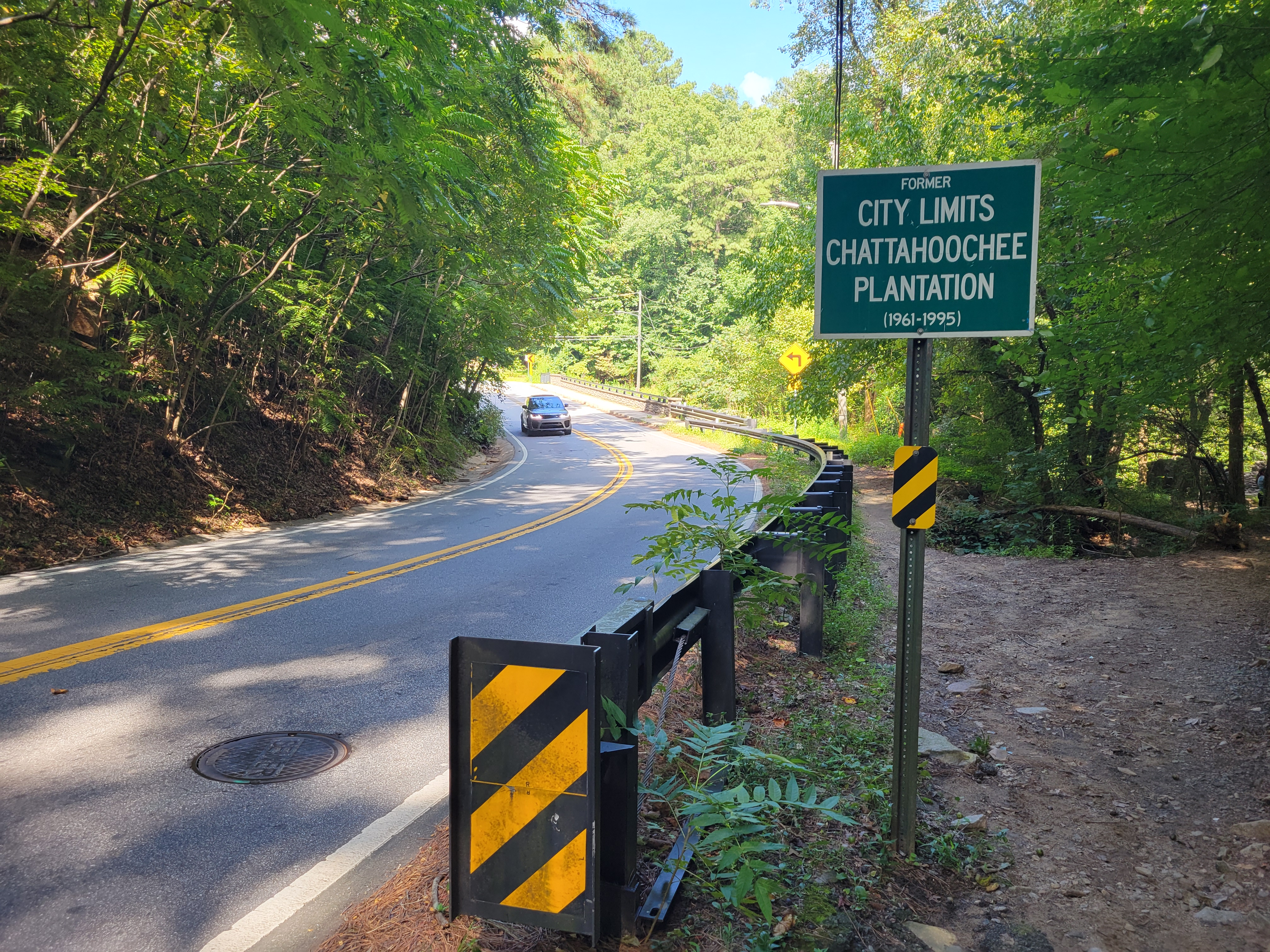
- City Limits sign (1961-1995)

- Location within Georgia Location within the United States
- Coordinates: 33°56′30.37″N 84°24′47.74″W
- Country: United States
- State: Georgia
- County: Cobb
- Elevation: 873 ft (266 m)
- Time zone: UTC-5 (Eastern (EST))
  - Summer (DST): UTC-4 (EDT)
- GNIS feature ID: 325838

Chattahoochee Plantation is an unincorporated community in Cobb County, Georgia, United States.

== History ==
The area was previously incorporated as a city in 1961 in hopes of building a luxury housing development around a golf club. In 1968, state legislators extended the city's boundaries to cover the entire length of Cobb County as a way to prevent the City of Atlanta from expanding into Cobb County. In 1989, an attempt was made by nearby Sandy Springs, in Fulton County, to have their area annexed by Chattahoochee Plantation in order to function as an independent city from Atlanta. This, like other attempts to gain city status, was defeated when Tom Murphy, speaker of the house in the Georgia General Assembly, blocked the measure. Chattahoochee Plantation never organized a city government, and its city charter was revoked in 1995. The area formerly considered part of Chattahoochee Plantation is noted by markers along its city limits.

Today, the median real estate price in Chattahoochee Plantation is one of the highest in the state of Georgia. The area includes several gated communities, upscale riverfront homes along Sope Creek and the Chattahoochee River, and private golf courses, including the Atlanta Country Club. Residents of Chattahoochee Plantation have a Marietta address, although they are outside Marietta city limits.
