= Utoy, Georgia =

Coordinates: 33.7239°N 84.5044°W

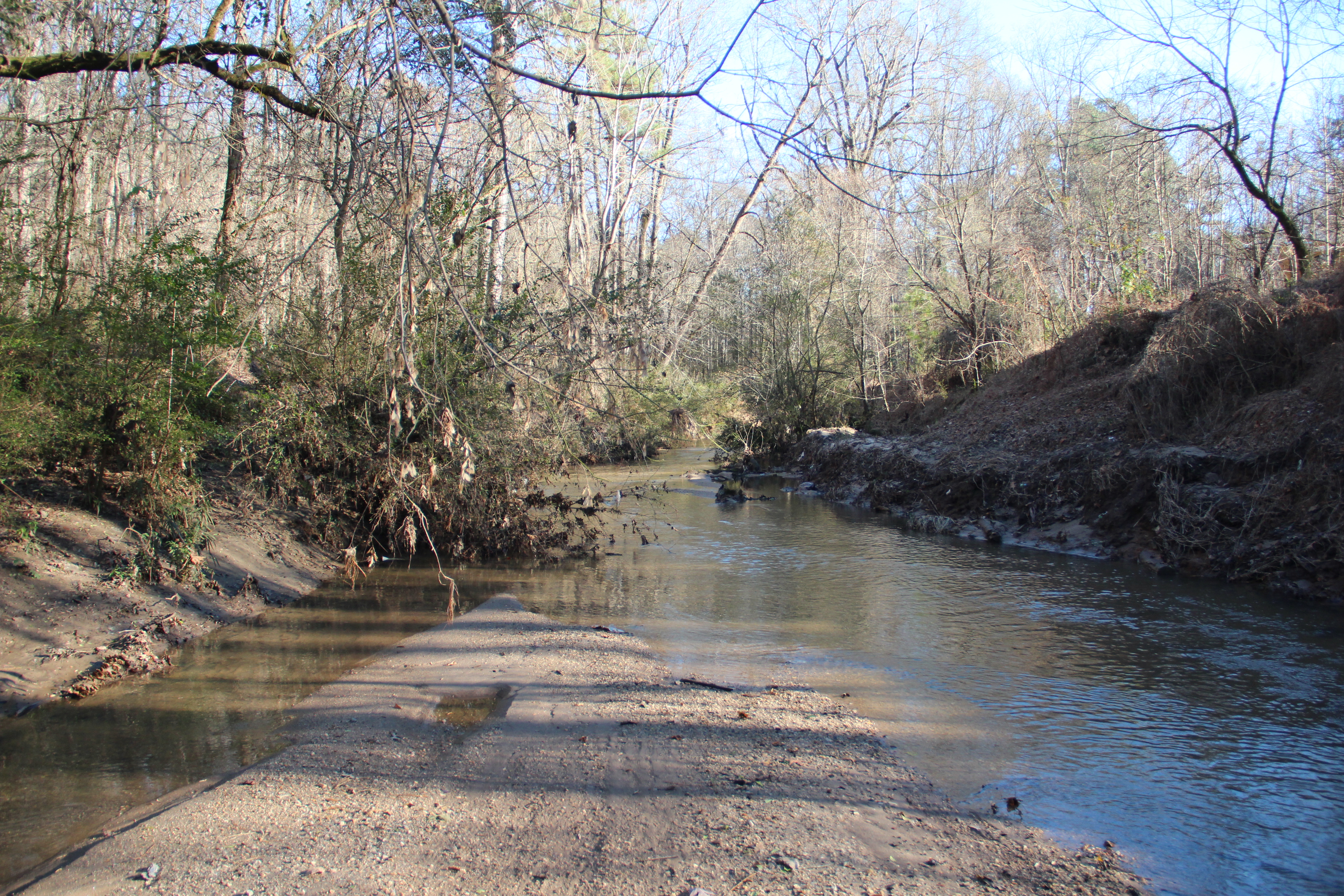
Utoy Creek, Cascade Springs Nature Preserve, Atlanta Dec 2018

Utoy, Georgia was a small village located along Utoy Creek in present-day Fulton County, Georgia, USA. The vicinity, now part of metropolitan Atlanta, was the scene of the August 1864 Battle of Utoy Creek during the American Civil War and is today the site of Utoy Indian Village, a tourist center with renditions of historic Native-American structures and which offers a "Civil War Battlefield Tour."

== History ==
=== Aboriginal period ===
A branch of the Creek (Muscogian) people living on the boundary of the Chattahoochee and Cherokee lands existed since the 15th century in this area hunting local deer and farming maize, peas, squash, the polk plant and other items. They lived in wood cabins known as lodges which were filled with clay. Early settlers were taught to subsist in the Muscogian manner and to survive the winter using local herbs and plants. They were peaceful farmers who subsisted well with their neighbors.

In 1521, the vicinity was likely visited by Spanish Explorer Juan Ponce de León in his travels looking for both gold and the fountain of youth. He traveled to modern day Atlanta up the Indian Sandtown Trail, today's Cascade Road.

=== Colonial period ===
At the time of the American Revolution the Muscogee (Creek) people maintained peaceful relations with the white settlers to the south who were fighting the British Army. In return in 1789 they were granted a treaty from the United States Senate ostensibly guaranteeing the sanctity of their lands.

In 1816 a South Carolina Missionary from the Methodist Church named Gilbert ministered to the local Indians at the village of Utoy.

In 1821 the US Government forcibly moved the local Creek Indians to Oklahoma on what is referred to as the so-called Trail of Tears.

In 1822 the First US Post Office was established here the first in Dekalb at the former site of the Utoy Trading Post.

The first settlers in the Atlanta area settled here as the lands had already been cleared and were ready for immediate farming. Existing trails, taking the form today of Sandtown Road, provided a major trading path that developed trade into the new county seat of Decatur from the Chattahoochee River.

=== Civil War period ===
Full article: Battle of Utoy Creek

In 1864 the town of Utoy was visited by US Forces moving to break the railroads at East Point. August 267th 1864 the Entire US Army moved down the Fairburn Road in the vicinity of the town of Utoy en route to Shadnar Church (Red Oak) to cut the West Point Railroad bringing supplies to the Confederate Army.

=== Post-war years ===
In 1933 the postal function was moved to Adamsville (The former village of Lick Skillet, named for the "Lickskillet Pub") and the Utoy post office was closed.

In the 1950s the area became one of the most affluent suburbs of Atlanta with many prominent citizens residing here in Cascade heights. The housing boom with US Army veterans purchasing homes utilizing the VA Housing Guarantee caused great expansion of the former farmlands

In 1975 the area became predominantly African American 85% and still maintained as one of Atlanta's affluent suburbs. Former Mayor Andrew Young, Shirley Franklin, Hank Aaron and the first president of the Savannah College of Art and Design are all from the area.

== See also ==
- Utoy Cemetery
