= Sandtown, Georgia =

Neighborhood in Georgia, U.S.

Coordinates: 33°08′20″N 83°07′37″W

Sandtown is a neighborhood located southwest of Atlanta, Georgia, United States.

== Location ==
Sandtown is largely a residential community in the city of South Fulton. It is a suburb of the City of Atlanta whose borders are shared. The definition of its borders varies as there is an official Sandtown Overlay District established under Fulton County and subsequently adopted by South Fulton, GA when the area was incorporated in 2017 and the informal definition of the area.

== History ==
Sandtown, formerly called Buzzard's Roost, was one of the largest Native villages in the area where Atlanta would develop.

After the Trail of Tears and the government of Georgia divided the territory into counties, Sandtown ended up in Campbell County, which was later absorbed into Fulton County in 1932 along with Milton County.

The road now known as Cascade was originally an Indian trail known as the Sandtown Road and ran from the village on the Chattahoochee River near Utoy Creek east through what became Five Points then to the vicinity of Decatur. This was the oldest settled area in current Fulton County. Atlanta's first doctor, Joshua Gilbert, lived along the Sandtown Road near the present-day Cascade Nature Preserve. The Union Army used his home as a hospital during the Battle of Utoy Creek.

During the American Civil War there were two roads to Sandtown (the current Cascade and Campbelltown roads), which were prominent locations of Union Army operations during the Siege of Atlanta. The Battle of Utoy Creek was fought along the Sandtown (Cascade) Road in Cascade Heights from 1–7 August 1864. Major General William T. Sherman's headquarters was along the southern Sandtown (Campbellton) Road on August 26, 1864.

In 2006, Sandtown applied for annexation to the city of Atlanta. Atlanta put Sandtown's application on hold.

In 2007, a vote in unincorporated southern Fulton County, including Sandtown, on whether to form a new city of South Fulton, Georgia, resulted against such a formation, although the merger still occurred a decade later, in 2017.

== Transportation ==
The neighborhood is served by State Route 6 (SR 6; Camp Creek Parkway) and SR 154/SR 166 (Campbellton Road SW). Boat Rock Road intersects SR 154/SR 166 on the northeastern corner of the commonly accepted boundary.

== Community association ==
The Sandtown Community Association, previously known as the Sandtown Homeowners Association, is a registered nearly 20-year-old community advocacy organization. It is a voluntary community-based group that addresses issues regarding zonings, residential/commercial development, land use and education.
