= Beloit, Georgia =

Unincorporated community in Georgia, U.S.

Coordinates: 31°40′26″N 84°04′37″W

Beloit is an unincorporated community in Lee County, in the U.S. state of Georgia.

== History ==
A post office called Beloit was established in 1892, and remained in operation until 1903. The community most likely was named after Beloit, Wisconsin. The Georgia General Assembly incorporated Beloit as a town in 1903. The town's charter was dissolved in 1995.
