= Battle of Utoy Creek =

Battle of the American Civil War

Coordinates: 33.7209°N 84.4704°W

- Part of the American Civil War
Date	August 5, 1864 – August 7, 1864
Location	Fulton County, Georgia
Result	Inconclusive

Belligerents
United States (Union)	(Confederate States of America) CSA (Confederacy)

Commanders and leaders
William T. Sherman; John M. Schofield; John Palmer	John Bell Hood; Stephen D. Lee; William B. Bate

Units involved
XXIII Corps; XIV Corps	Army of Tennessee

Casualties and losses
850	345

The Battle of Utoy Creek was fought August 5–7, 1864, during the Atlanta campaign of the American Civil War. Maj. Gen. William T. Sherman's Union armies had partially encircled the city of Atlanta, Georgia, which was being held by Confederate forces under the command of General John Bell Hood. Sherman had at this point adopted a strategy of attacking the railroad lines into Atlanta, hoping to cut off his enemies' supplies. This was the third direct attack on Confederate positions during the campaign.

== Battle ==
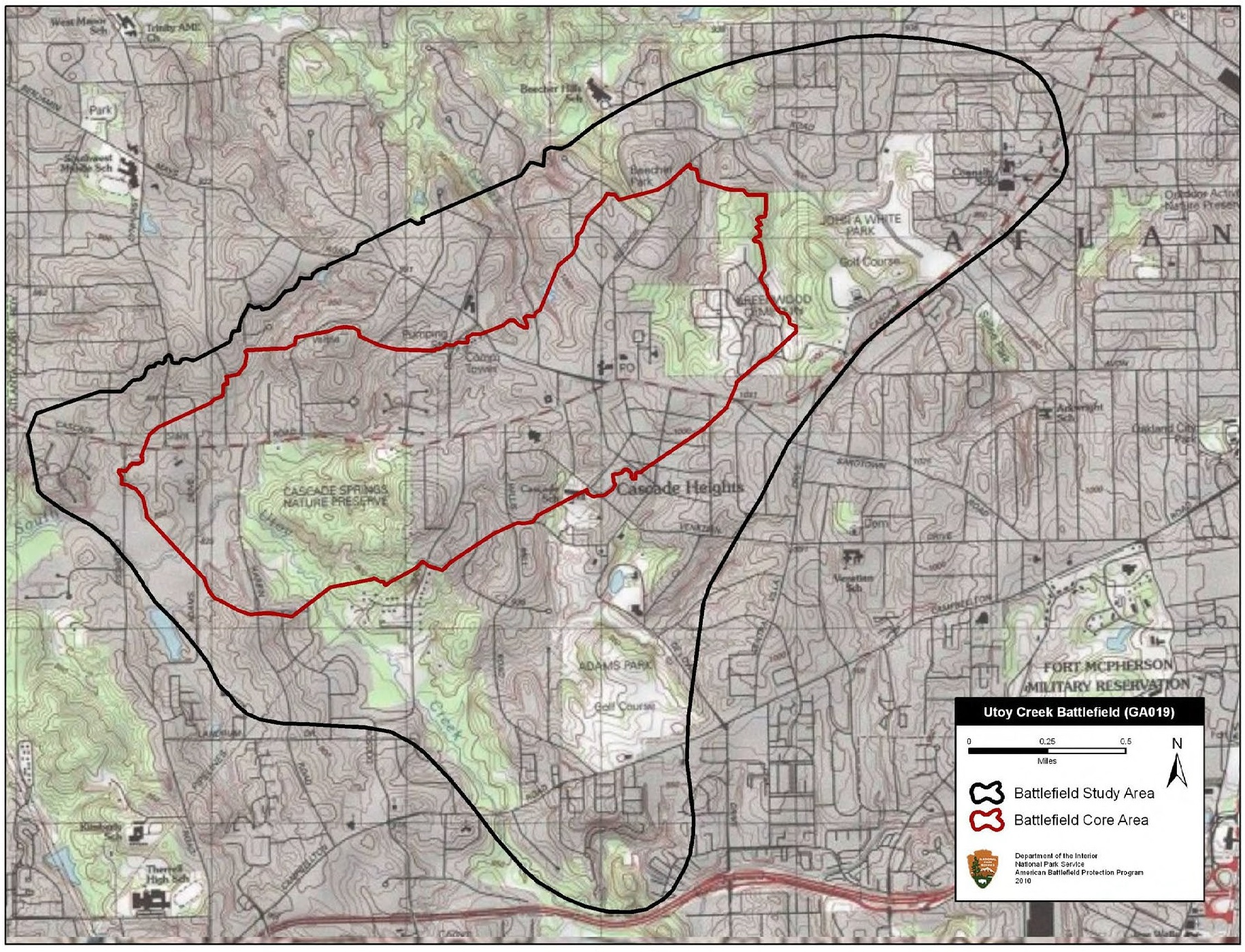
Map of Utoy Creek Battlefield core and study areas by the American Battlefield Protection Program.

After failing to envelop Hood's left flank at the Battle of Ezra Church, Sherman still wanted to extend his right flank to hit the railroad between East Point and Atlanta. He transferred Maj. Gen. John M. Schofield's XXIII Corps of the USA Army of the Ohio from his left to his right flank and sent him to the north bank of Utoy Creek.

Although Schofield’s troops were at Utoy Creek on August 2, they, along with the XIV Corps, Army of the Cumberland, did not cross until August 4. An initial attack by the Regular Brigade against J. Patton Anderson's Division CSA of Stephen Dill Lee's Corps was unsuccessful. In addition the Confederates dismounted a brigade of cavalry, Armstrong's, in the front of the federals in a deception plan, a feinted attack that was successful in delaying the combined force of the XXIII and XIV Corps USA. Schofield made an additional movement to exploit this situation on the morning of August 5. Although initially successful, Schofield had to regroup his forces, which took the rest of the day. The delay allowed the Confederates to strengthen their defenses with an abatis, which slowed the Union attack when it restarted on the morning of August 6.

The Federals were repulsed with heavy losses by William B. Bate's division and failed in an attempt to break the main defenses to gain the railroad. On August 7, the Union troops moved toward the Confederate main line skirmishing and extending to their right and entrenched. Several attacks were made at Sandtown Road (Campbellton at Adams Park) on 10 August and East Point on 18 August. Here US Forces remained, as far south as the Atlanta Christian College, until late August 1864 when the failure of Schofield's offensive operations convinced Sherman to move on the Confederate lines of communication and supply.

== Aftermath ==
PVT Samuel Grimshaw of the XIV Army Corps, USA was awarded the Congressional Medal of Honor for his actions against a Confederate Artillery Battery along the Sandtown (Cascade Road) during the main attack on 6 August 1864.

PVT Benjamin Van Raalte was nominated for the Congressional Medal of Honor for the recovery of the Unit Colors of the 25th Michigan Infantry, Hascall's Division, XXIII Army Corps, USA. The Federal Colors were captured by the Confederates of Armstrong's Brigade of Cavalry dismounted as infantry.

The Confederate Corps Commander, Lt General Steven D. Lee, cited Bate's Division and especially Tyler's and Lewis's Brigades for the repulse of a superior enemy force and the capture of 200 prisoners and three stands of Colors.

== See also ==
- Atlanta in the Civil War
- Utoy, Georgia
- Utoy Cemetery
