= B. T. Brown Reservoir =

Reservoir in Georgia, USA

- Location within Georgia Location within the United States
- Location: Coweta County, Georgia, United States
- Coordinates: 33.48647°N 84.74242°W
- Type: reservoir
- Surface area: 300 acres (1.2 km^{2})

B.T. Brown Reservoir is a reservoir of 300 acres (1.2 km^{2}) in Coweta County, Georgia, United States. It is located at 621 S Alexander Creek Road Newnan, Georgia 30263. The reservoir is maintained by the Coweta County Water & Sewerage Authority . The reservoir was built for its ability to be a water treatment facility. The reservoir was rebuilt at a cost of $13 million and completed in 2006. The production of drinking water began in 2007. As of 2007, this facility will produce 2 million US gallons (7,600 m^{3}) of water daily with a maximum capacity to produce 6 million US gallons (23,000 m^{3}) daily.

B.T. Brown reservoir is accessible to all Coweta County Residents with a few requirements. Obtaining a permit requires going to the Coweta County Water & Sewerage Authority located at 545 Corinth Road, Newnan, Georgia 30263.

== Pavilion ==
The Pavilion was torn down and is no longer available for public use.
