= Carex acidicola =

Scientific classification
- Kingdom: Plantae
- Clade: Tracheophytes
- Clade: Angiosperms
- Clade: Monocots
- Clade: Commelinids
- Order: Poales
- Family: Cyperaceae
- Genus: Carex
- Species: C. acidicola

Binomial name
- Carex acidicola Naczi

Species of plant in the sedge family

Carex acidicola (common name: acid-loving sedge) is a tussock-forming species of perennial sedge in the family Cyperaceae. It is native to south eastern parts of the United States in Alabama and Georgia.

The species was first described by the botanist Robert Naczi in 2002 from the type specimen collected in Clarke County in Georgia and was published in the journal Novon.

== Description ==
This tuft-forming plant produces stems from the same rhizomatous root, forming a dense mat. It has purple to reddish-coloured culms that are 11 to 41 cm (4.3 to 16.1 in) in length and have a width of 3.2 to 7.4 cm (1.3 to 2.9 in) at the base. Proximal bract blades are whitish in colour. Leaves are deep green, with a width of 3.7 to 5.5 mm (0.15 to 0.22 in) at the base.

== Distribution and habitat ==
In 2002 this species was believed to grow in only a handful of sites in Georgia and Alabama. It is usually found in sandy, acidic or loamy soils in deciduous forests. It often occurs with Carex superata.

== See also ==
- List of Carex species
