= Campbell County Courthouse =

Campbell County Courthouse may refer to:

- Campbell County Courthouse (Georgia), Fairburn, Georgia
- Campbell County Courthouse (Newport, Kentucky), listed on the National Register of Historic Places
- Campbell County Courthouse (Virginia), Rustburg, Virginia
- Campbell County Courthouse (Wyoming), Sheridan, Wyoming
