= 1892 United States presidential election in Georgia =

- November 8, 1892

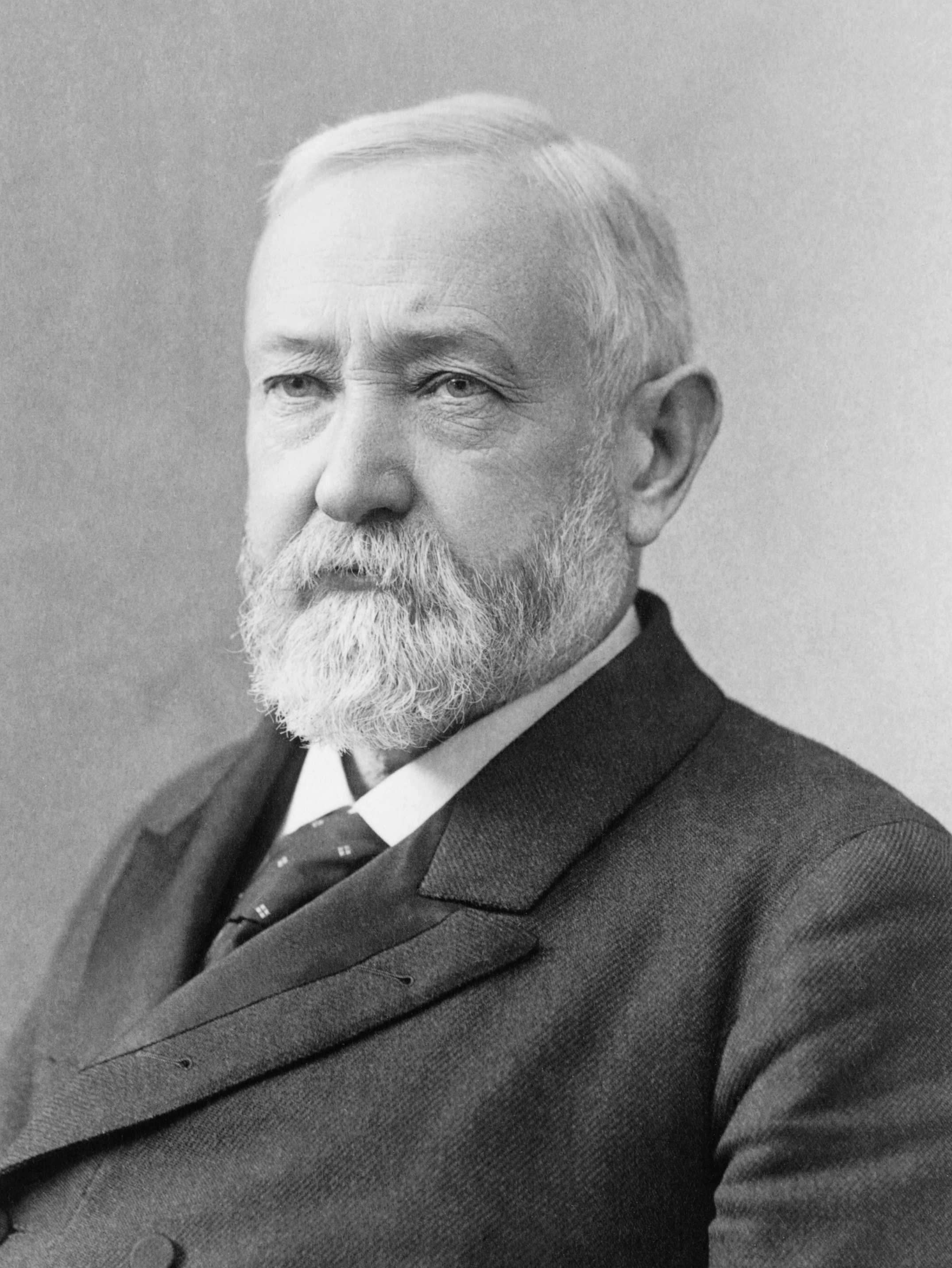

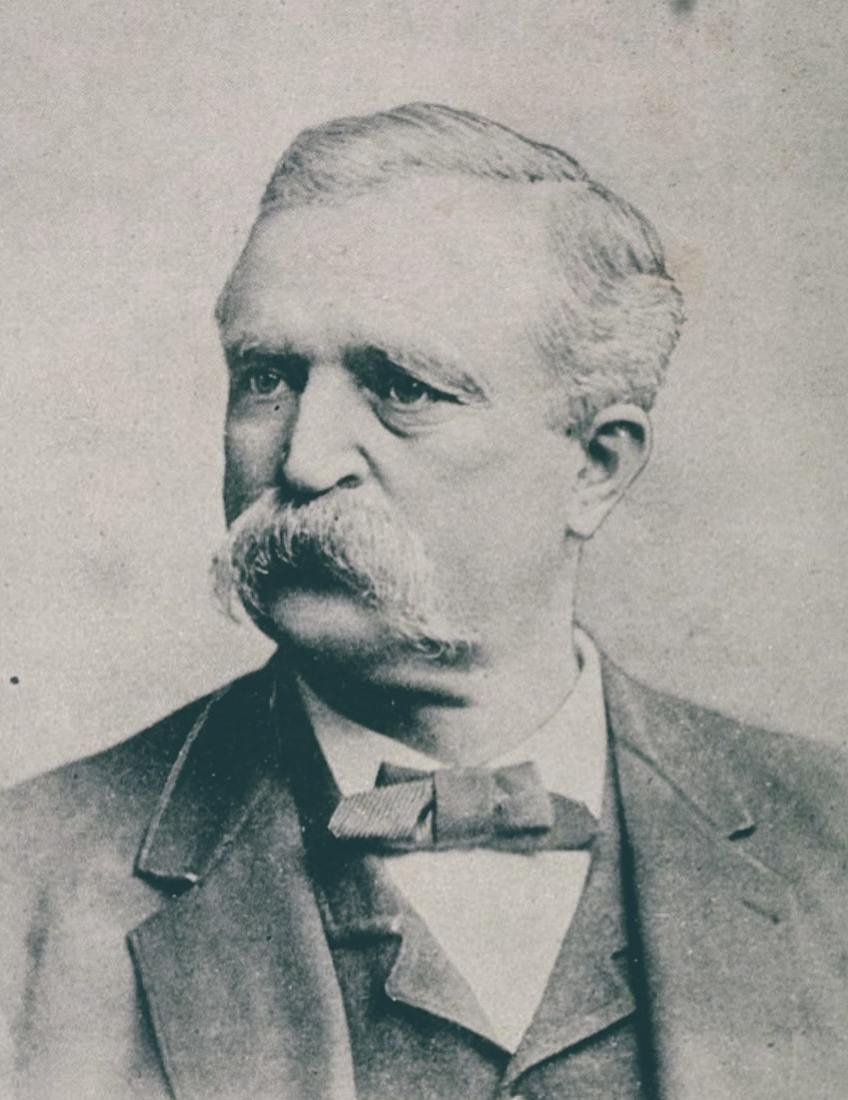
| Nominee | Grover Cleveland | Benjamin Harrison | James B. Weaver |
| Party | Democratic | Republican | Populist |
| Home state | New York | Indiana | Iowa |
| Running mate | Adlai Stevenson I | Whitelaw Reid | James G. Field |
| Electoral vote | 13 | 0 | 0 |
| Popular vote | 129,446 | 48,408 | 41,939 |
| Percentage | 58.01% | 21.70% | 18.80% |
County results
Cleveland
30–40%
40–50%
50–60%
60–70%
70–80%
80–90%
90–100%
Harrison
30–40%
40–50%
50–60%
60–70%
Weaver
40–50%
50–60%
60–70%
70–80%
President before election
Benjamin Harrison
Republican
Elected President
Grover Cleveland
Democratic

The 1892 United States presidential election in Georgia took place on November 8, 1892, as part of the wider United States presidential election. Voters chose 13 representatives, or electors, to the Electoral College, who voted for president and vice president.

Following Reconstruction, Georgia would be the first former Confederate state to substantially disenfranchise its newly enfranchised freedmen and many poor whites, doing so in the early 1870s. This largely limited the Republican Party to a few North Georgia counties with substantial Civil War Unionist sentiment – chiefly Fannin but also to a lesser extent Pickens, Gilmer and Towns – and in presidential elections to a small number of counties elsewhere where blacks were not fully disenfranchised. The Democratic Party served as the guardian of white supremacy against a Republican Party historically associated with memories of Reconstruction, and the main competition became Democratic primaries, which were restricted to whites on the grounds of the Democratic Party being legally a private club. This restriction was done by local county laws, but combined with the highly efficacious cumulative poll tax introduced in 1877 meant that turnout declined steadily throughout the 1880s, unlike any other former Confederate state except South Carolina.

However, politics after the first demobilization was always chaotic. Third-party movements, chiefly the Populist Party, gained support amongst the remaining poor white and black voters in opposition to the planter elite. Whereas the Republican Party had not contested a statewide election seriously since 1876, the Populists made a significant run for governor in 1892 as they launched the most significant third-party campaign since John Bell in the sectionally divided 1860 election. In Georgia, the Populists would be led by Thomas E. Watson, who had won a seat in Congress in 1890.

However, the strong emphasis by Cleveland and running mate Adlai Stevenson I on opposing the Lodge Force Bill and on reducing tariffs was able to reduce defections to the Populists or the GOP, despite strong opposition in the state to Cleveland's rigid support for the gold standard against free silver. The Populist influence caused voter turnout to rise substantially – some believing that many new voters had their poll taxes paid for – but despite opposition forces gaining more than twice as many votes as in 1888 Cleveland's margin fell by less than five percent as his opposition was divided. Rather than in the poor white upcountry counties, Weaver actually did best in the northeastern part of the Black Belt where Watson was based and where Populist strength would remain greatest in 1904 and 1908.

The Republicans won eight counties, six were majority white and two were majority black.

== Results ==
1892 United States presidential election in Georgia
| Party | Candidate | Votes | Percentage | Electoral votes |
|---|---|---|---|---|
| Democratic | Grover Cleveland | 129,446 | 58.01% | 13 |
| Republican | Benjamin Harrison (incumbent) | 48,408 | 21.70% | 0 |
| People's | James B. Weaver | 41,939 | 18.80% | 0 |
| Write-ins | Scattered | 2,345 | 1.05% | 0 |
| Prohibition | John Bidwell | 988 | 0.44% | 0 |

=== Results by county ===
| County | Stephen Grover Cleveland Democratic | | Benjamin Harrison Republican | | James Baird Weaver People's | | John Bidwell Prohibition | | Various candidates Write-ins | | Margin | | Total votes cast |
| County | # | % | # | % | # | % | # | % | # | % | # | % | Total votes cast |
|---|---|---|---|---|---|---|---|---|---|---|---|---|---|
| Appling | 554 | 47.59% | 219 | 18.81% | 98 | 8.42% | 1 | 0.09% | 292 | 25.09% | 335 | 28.78% | 1,164 |
| Baker | 598 | 75.98% | 54 | 6.86% | 133 | 16.90% | 2 | 0.25% | | | 465 (Note: In this county where Harrison ran behind both Cleveland and Weaver, margin given is Cleveland vote minus Weaver vote and percentage margin Cleveland percentage minus Weaver percentage.) | 59.09% | 787 |
| Baldwin | 541 | 71.66% | 120 | 15.89% | 91 | 12.05% | 3 | 0.40% | | | 421 | 55.76% | 755 |
| Banks | 622 | 46.59% | 209 | 15.66% | 489 | 36.63% | 15 | 1.12% | | | 133 | 9.96% | 1,335 |
| Bartow | 1,327 | 62.01% | 445 | 20.79% | 345 | 16.12% | 23 | 1.07% | | | 882 | 41.21% | 2,140 |
| Berrien | 1,188 | 79.31% | 149 | 9.95% | 160 | 10.68% | 1 | 0.07% | | | 1,028 | 68.62% | 1,498 |
| Bibb | 3,627 | 83.00% | 641 | 14.67% | 77 | 1.76% | 25 | 0.57% | | | 2,986 | 68.33% | 4,370 |
| Brooks | 944 | 60.98% | 516 | 33.33% | 84 | 5.43% | 4 | 0.26% | | | 428 | 27.65% | 1,548 |
| Bryan | 292 | 65.91% | 147 | 33.18% | 4 | 0.90% | 0 | 0.00% | | | 145 | 32.73% | 443 |
| Bulloch | 1,239 | 60.20% | 214 | 10.40% | 600 | 29.15% | 5 | 0.24% | | | 639 | 31.05% | 2,058 |
| Burke | 1,322 | 62.39% | 83 | 3.92% | 431 | 20.34% | 0 | 0.00% | 283 | 13.36% | 891 | 42.05% | 2,119 |
| Butts | 818 | 56.85% | 393 | 27.31% | 218 | 15.15% | 10 | 0.69% | | | 425 | 29.53% | 1,439 |
| Calhoun | 527 | 51.97% | 427 | 42.11% | 57 | 5.62% | 3 | 0.30% | | | 100 | 9.86% | 1,014 |
| Camden | 179 | 36.16% | 305 | 61.62% | 8 | 1.62% | 3 | 0.61% | | | -126 | -25.45% | 495 |
| Campbell | 466 | 36.18% | 451 | 35.02% | 370 | 28.73% | 1 | 0.08% | | | 15 | 1.16% | 1,288 |
| Carroll | 2,137 | 64.19% | 543 | 16.31% | 638 | 19.16% | 11 | 0.33% | | | 1,499 | 45.03% | 3,329 |
| Catoosa | 576 | 81.59% | 69 | 9.77% | 57 | 8.07% | 4 | 0.57% | | | 507 | 71.81% | 706 |
| Charlton | 192 | 77.42% | 22 | 8.87% | 11 | 4.44% | 2 | 0.81% | 21 | 8.47% | 170 | 68.55% | 248 |
| Chatham | 5,264 | 78.83% | 1,359 | 20.35% | 53 | 0.79% | 2 | 0.03% | | | 3,905 | 58.48% | 6,678 |
| Chattahoochee | 243 | 39.45% | 247 | 40.10% | 126 | 20.45% | 0 | 0.00% | | | -4 | -0.65% | 616 |
| Chattooga | 1,060 | 71.86% | 245 | 16.61% | 162 | 10.98% | 8 | 0.54% | | | 815 | 55.25% | 1,475 |
| Cherokee | 927 | 44.06% | 382 | 18.16% | 789 | 37.50% | 6 | 0.29% | | | 138 | 6.56% | 2,104 |
| Clarke | 835 | 55.12% | 545 | 35.97% | 130 | 8.58% | 5 | 0.33% | | | 290 | 19.14% | 1,515 |
| Clay | 506 | 69.70% | 104 | 14.33% | 87 | 11.98% | 2 | 0.28% | 27 | 3.72% | 402 | 55.37% | 726 |
| Clayton | 518 | 42.67% | 335 | 27.59% | 360 | 29.65% | 1 | 0.08% | | | 158 | 13.01% | 1,214 |
| Clinch | 481 | 74.23% | 102 | 15.74% | 62 | 9.57% | 3 | 0.46% | | | 379 | 58.49% | 648 |
| Cobb | 1,794 | 62.44% | 564 | 19.63% | 508 | 17.68% | 7 | 0.24% | | | 1,230 | 42.81% | 2,873 |
| Coffee | 599 | 51.73% | 70 | 6.04% | 156 | 13.47% | 2 | 0.17% | 331 | 28.58% | 443 | 38.26% | 1,158 |
| Colquitt | 459 | 64.74% | 5 | 0.71% | 161 | 22.71% | 2 | 0.28% | 82 | 11.57% | 298 | 42.03% | 709 |
| Columbia | 451 | 21.22% | 101 | 4.75% | 1,569 | 73.84% | 4 | 0.19% | | | -1,118 | -52.61% | 2,125 |
| Coweta | 2,005 | 63.75% | 1,085 | 34.50% | 53 | 1.69% | 2 | 0.06% | | | 920 | 29.25% | 3,145 |
| Crawford | 685 | 62.33% | 288 | 26.21% | 126 | 11.46% | 0 | 0.00% | | | 397 | 36.12% | 1,099 |
| Dade | 511 | 77.19% | 53 | 8.01% | 98 | 14.80% | 0 | 0.00% | | | 413 | 62.39% | 662 |
| Dawson | 356 | 49.04% | 157 | 21.63% | 208 | 28.65% | 5 | 0.69% | | | 148 | 20.39% | 726 |
| DeKalb | 1,370 | 57.13% | 496 | 20.68% | 520 | 21.68% | 12 | 0.50% | | | 850 | 35.45% | 2,398 |
| Decatur | 1,349 | 56.82% | 561 | 23.63% | 464 | 19.55% | 0 | 0.00% | | | 788 | 33.19% | 2,374 |
| Dodge | 795 | 78.56% | 209 | 20.65% | 6 | 0.59% | 2 | 0.20% | | | 586 | 57.91% | 1,012 |
| Dooly | 1,350 | 61.96% | 506 | 23.22% | 319 | 14.64% | 4 | 0.18% | | | 844 | 38.73% | 2,179 |
| Dougherty | 1,254 | 73.51% | 446 | 26.14% | 0 | 0.00% | 6 | 0.35% | | | 808 | 47.36% | 1,706 |
| Douglas | 467 | 39.11% | 234 | 19.60% | 457 | 38.27% | 2 | 0.17% | 34 | 2.85% | 10 | 0.84% | 1,194 |
| Early | 882 | 57.35% | 367 | 23.86% | 285 | 18.53% | 4 | 0.26% | | | 515 | 33.49% | 1,538 |
| Echols | 270 | 80.36% | 54 | 16.07% | 9 | 2.68% | 3 | 0.89% | | | 216 | 64.29% | 336 |
| Effingham | 464 | 69.67% | 123 | 18.47% | 78 | 11.71% | 1 | 0.15% | | | 341 | 51.20% | 666 |
| Elbert | 1,486 | 74.94% | 6 | 0.30% | 482 | 24.31% | 9 | 0.45% | | | 1,480 | 74.63% | 1,983 |
| Emanuel | 903 | 49.75% | 61 | 3.36% | 851 | 46.89% | 0 | 0.00% | | | 52 | 2.87% | 1,815 |
| Fannin | 431 | 39.29% | 646 | 58.89% | 10 | 0.91% | 10 | 0.91% | | | -215 | -19.60% | 1,097 |
| Fayette | 547 | 44.76% | 192 | 15.71% | 479 | 39.20% | 4 | 0.33% | | | 68 | 5.56% | 1,222 |
| Floyd | 1,742 | 60.95% | 684 | 23.93% | 390 | 13.65% | 42 | 1.47% | | | 1,058 | 37.02% | 2,858 |
| Forsyth | 645 | 40.75% | 163 | 10.30% | 775 | 48.96% | 0 | 0.00% | | | -130 | -8.21% | 1,583 |
| Franklin | 867 | 44.21% | 156 | 7.96% | 927 | 47.27% | 11 | 0.56% | | | -60 | -3.06% | 1,961 |
| Fulton | 4,663 | 74.61% | 1,364 | 21.82% | 129 | 2.06% | 94 | 1.50% | | | 3,299 | 52.78% | 6,250 |
| Gilmer | 602 | 52.35% | 483 | 42.00% | 48 | 4.17% | 17 | 1.48% | | | 119 | 10.35% | 1,150 |
| Glascock | 216 | 28.38% | 57 | 7.49% | 485 | 63.73% | 3 | 0.39% | | | -269 | -35.35% | 761 |
| Glynn | 1,028 | 60.86% | 643 | 38.07% | 6 | 0.36% | 12 | 0.71% | | | 385 | 22.79% | 1,689 |
| Gordon | 1,028 | 63.77% | 233 | 14.45% | 346 | 21.46% | 5 | 0.31% | | | 682 | 42.31% | 1,612 |
| Greene | 684 | 33.48% | 777 | 38.03% | 578 | 28.29% | 4 | 0.20% | | | -93 | -4.55% | 2,043 |
| Gwinnett | 1,572 | 57.14% | 253 | 9.20% | 918 | 33.37% | 8 | 0.29% | | | 654 | 23.77% | 2,751 |
| Habersham | 1,019 | 65.36% | 180 | 11.55% | 307 | 19.69% | 53 | 3.40% | | | 712 | 45.67% | 1,559 |
| Hall | 1,526 | 61.26% | 237 | 9.51% | 704 | 28.26% | 24 | 0.96% | | | 822 | 33.00% | 2,491 |
| Hancock | 1,436 | 65.07% | 218 | 9.88% | 553 | 25.06% | 0 | 0.00% | | | 883 | 40.01% | 2,207 |
| Haralson | 807 | 57.73% | 247 | 17.67% | 317 | 22.68% | 27 | 1.93% | | | 490 | 35.05% | 1,398 |
| Harris | 1,076 | 47.23% | 602 | 26.43% | 597 | 26.21% | 3 | 0.13% | | | 474 | 20.81% | 2,278 |
| Hart | 839 | 58.22% | 86 | 5.97% | 513 | 35.60% | 3 | 0.21% | | | 326 | 22.62% | 1,441 |
| Heard | 837 | 66.59% | 322 | 25.62% | 94 | 7.48% | 4 | 0.32% | | | 515 | 40.97% | 1,257 |
| Henry | 718 | 38.50% | 578 | 30.99% | 387 | 20.75% | 5 | 0.27% | 177 | 9.49% | 140 | 7.51% | 1,865 |
| Houston | 1,953 | 78.88% | 507 | 20.48% | 16 | 0.65% | 0 | 0.00% | | | 1,446 | 58.40% | 2,476 |
| Irwin | 551 | 76.32% | 43 | 5.96% | 24 | 3.32% | 1 | 0.14% | 103 | 14.27% | 508 | 70.36% | 722 |
| Jackson | 1,566 | 46.58% | 491 | 14.60% | 1,294 | 38.49% | 11 | 0.33% | | | 272 | 8.09% | 3,362 |
| Jasper | 797 | 69.36% | 284 | 24.72% | 64 | 5.57% | 4 | 0.35% | | | 513 | 44.65% | 1,149 |
| Jefferson | 768 | 26.81% | 641 | 22.37% | 1,440 | 50.26% | 16 | 0.56% | | | -672 | -23.46% | 2,865 |
| Johnson | 393 | 28.44% | 247 | 17.87% | 737 | 53.33% | 5 | 0.36% | | | -344 | -24.89% | 1,382 |
| Jones | 659 | 49.96% | 568 | 43.06% | 92 | 6.97% | 0 | 0.00% | | | 91 | 6.90% | 1,319 |
| Laurens | 928 | 48.95% | 468 | 24.68% | 500 | 26.37% | 0 | 0.00% | | | 428 | 22.57% | 1,896 |
| Lee | 300 | 41.38% | 422 | 58.21% | 3 | 0.41% | 0 | 0.00% | | | -122 | -16.83% | 725 |
| Liberty | 419 | 30.83% | 736 | 54.16% | 199 | 14.64% | 5 | 0.37% | | | -317 | -23.33% | 1,359 |
| Lincoln | 313 | 26.44% | 4 | 0.34% | 866 | 73.14% | 1 | 0.08% | | | -553 | -46.71% | 1,184 |
| Lowndes | 988 | 56.39% | 509 | 29.05% | 251 | 14.33% | 4 | 0.23% | | | 479 | 27.34% | 1,752 |
| Lumpkin | 361 | 44.57% | 269 | 33.21% | 169 | 20.86% | 11 | 1.36% | | | 92 | 11.36% | 810 |
| Macon | 676 | 55.64% | 240 | 19.75% | 298 | 24.53% | 1 | 0.08% | | | 378 | 31.11% | 1,215 |
| Madison | 737 | 71.28% | 125 | 12.09% | 76 | 7.35% | 4 | 0.39% | 92 | 8.90% | 612 | 59.19% | 1,034 |
| Marion | 436 | 37.75% | 387 | 33.51% | 324 | 28.05% | 8 | 0.69% | | | 49 | 4.24% | 1,155 |
| McDuffie | 289 | 18.10% | 453 | 28.37% | 855 | 53.54% | 0 | 0.00% | | | -402 (Note: In this county where Cleveland ran third behind both Harrison and Weaver, margin given is Harrison vote minus Weaver vote and percentage margin Harrison percentage minus Weaver percentage.) | -25.17% | 1,597 |
| McIntosh | 302 | 30.41% | 689 | 69.39% | 2 | 0.20% | 0 | 0.00% | | | -387 | -38.97% | 993 |
| Meriwether | 1,287 | 47.68% | 1,046 | 38.76% | 350 | 12.97% | 16 | 0.59% | | | 241 | 8.93% | 2,699 |
| Miller | 371 | 70.53% | 0 | 0.00% | 0 | 0.00% | 122 | 23.19% | 33 | 6.27% | 249 (Note: In this county where Bidwell ran second behind Cleveland, margin given is Cleveland vote minus Bidwell vote and percentage margin Cleveland percentage minus Bidwell percentage.) | 47.34% | 526 |
| Milton | 619 | 66.35% | 73 | 7.82% | 241 | 25.83% | 0 | 0.00% | | | 378 | 40.51% | 933 |
| Mitchell | 599 | 66.48% | 196 | 21.75% | 106 | 11.76% | 0 | 0.00% | | | 403 | 44.73% | 901 |
| Monroe | 1,323 | 51.46% | 839 | 32.63% | 402 | 15.64% | 7 | 0.27% | | | 484 | 18.83% | 2,571 |
| Montgomery | 724 | 62.96% | 277 | 24.09% | 146 | 12.70% | 3 | 0.26% | | | 447 | 38.87% | 1,150 |
| Morgan | 761 | 59.78% | 357 | 28.04% | 117 | 9.19% | 9 | 0.71% | 29 | 2.28% | 404 | 31.74% | 1,273 |
| Murray | 553 | 57.42% | 163 | 16.93% | 192 | 19.94% | 6 | 0.62% | 49 | 5.09% | 361 | 37.49% | 963 |
| Muscogee | 2,062 | 77.69% | 540 | 20.35% | 51 | 1.92% | 1 | 0.04% | | | 1,522 | 57.35% | 2,654 |
| Newton | 1,005 | 59.89% | 611 | 36.41% | 51 | 3.04% | 11 | 0.66% | | | 394 | 23.48% | 1,678 |
| Oconee | 282 | 30.65% | 178 | 19.35% | 386 | 41.96% | 0 | 0.00% | 74 | 8.04% | -104 | -11.30% | 920 |
| Oglethorpe | 896 | 78.32% | 63 | 5.51% | 130 | 11.36% | 0 | 0.00% | 55 | 4.81% | 766 | 66.96% | 1,144 |
| Paulding | 641 | 42.59% | 158 | 10.50% | 703 | 46.71% | 3 | 0.20% | | | -62 | -4.12% | 1,505 |
| Pickens | 580 | 45.21% | 627 | 48.87% | 73 | 5.69% | 3 | 0.23% | | | -47 | -3.66% | 1,283 |
| Pierce | 397 | 64.14% | 107 | 17.29% | 60 | 9.69% | 4 | 0.65% | 51 | 8.24% | 290 | 46.85% | 619 |
| Pike | 1,195 | 57.81% | 649 | 31.40% | 216 | 10.45% | 7 | 0.34% | | | 546 | 26.42% | 2,067 |
| Polk | 748 | 48.13% | 391 | 25.16% | 400 | 25.74% | 15 | 0.97% | | | 348 | 22.39% | 1,554 |
| Pulaski | 1,134 | 80.54% | 184 | 13.07% | 85 | 6.04% | 5 | 0.36% | | | 950 | 67.47% | 1,408 |
| Putnam | 801 | 98.77% | 0 | 0.00% | 6 | 0.74% | 4 | 0.49% | | | 795 | 98.03% | 811 |
| Quitman | 230 | 40.85% | 294 | 52.22% | 35 | 6.22% | 0 | 0.00% | 4 | 0.71% | -64 | -11.37% | 563 |
| Rabun | 448 | 83.74% | 81 | 15.14% | 3 | 0.56% | 3 | 0.56% | | | 367 | 68.60% | 535 |
| Randolph | 721 | 64.43% | 351 | 31.37% | 47 | 4.20% | 0 | 0.00% | | | 370 | 33.07% | 1,119 |
| Richmond | 8,301 | 65.89% | 3,224 | 25.59% | 1,050 | 8.33% | 23 | 0.18% | | | 5,077 | 40.30% | 12,598 |
| Rockdale | 532 | 47.37% | 390 | 34.73% | 199 | 17.72% | 2 | 0.18% | | | 142 | 12.64% | 1,123 |
| Schley | 310 | 43.36% | 278 | 38.88% | 127 | 17.76% | 0 | 0.00% | | | 32 | 4.48% | 715 |
| Screven | 852 | 35.65% | 396 | 16.57% | 1,141 | 47.74% | 1 | 0.04% | | | -289 | -12.09% | 2,390 |
| Spalding | 1,004 | 73.99% | 314 | 23.14% | 28 | 2.06% | 11 | 0.81% | | | 690 | 50.85% | 1,357 |
| Stewart | 1,109 | 72.39% | 359 | 23.43% | 58 | 3.79% | 6 | 0.39% | | | 750 | 48.96% | 1,532 |
| Sumter | 1,259 | 68.46% | 390 | 21.21% | 189 | 10.28% | 1 | 0.05% | | | 869 | 47.25% | 1,839 |
| Talbot | 619 | 64.15% | 242 | 25.08% | 102 | 10.57% | 2 | 0.21% | | | 377 | 39.07% | 965 |
| Taliaferro | 298 | 28.09% | 76 | 7.16% | 687 | 64.75% | 0 | 0.00% | | | -389 | -36.66% | 1,061 |
| Tattnall | 918 | 51.11% | 247 | 13.75% | 493 | 27.45% | 4 | 0.22% | 134 | 7.46% | 425 | 23.66% | 1,796 |
| Taylor | 471 | 36.18% | 439 | 33.72% | 389 | 29.88% | 3 | 0.23% | | | 32 | 2.46% | 1,302 |
| Telfair | 703 | 77.77% | 190 | 21.02% | 0 | 0.00% | 11 | 1.22% | | | 513 | 56.75% | 904 |
| Terrell | 908 | 69.79% | 356 | 27.36% | 37 | 2.84% | 0 | 0.00% | | | 552 | 42.43% | 1,301 |
| Thomas | 1,294 | 58.61% | 566 | 25.63% | 340 | 15.40% | 8 | 0.36% | | | 728 | 32.97% | 2,208 |
| Towns | 369 | 50.14% | 352 | 47.83% | 13 | 1.77% | 2 | 0.27% | | | 17 | 2.31% | 736 |
| Troup | 1,765 | 78.65% | 346 | 15.42% | 132 | 5.88% | 1 | 0.04% | | | 1,419 | 63.24% | 2,244 |
| Twiggs | 435 | 42.73% | 235 | 23.08% | 25 | 2.46% | 0 | 0.00% | 323 | 31.73% | 200 | 19.65% | 1,018 |
| Union | 600 | 57.69% | 373 | 35.87% | 65 | 6.25% | 2 | 0.19% | | | 227 | 21.83% | 1,040 |
| Upson | 862 | 49.12% | 339 | 19.32% | 553 | 31.51% | 1 | 0.06% | | | 309 | 17.61% | 1,755 |
| Walker | 1,138 | 68.64% | 300 | 18.09% | 209 | 12.61% | 11 | 0.66% | | | 838 | 50.54% | 1,658 |
| Walton | 1,286 | 66.29% | 368 | 18.97% | 282 | 14.54% | 4 | 0.21% | | | 918 | 47.32% | 1,940 |
| Ware | 775 | 68.22% | 262 | 23.06% | 89 | 7.83% | 10 | 0.88% | | | 513 | 45.16% | 1,136 |
| Warren | 467 | 27.36% | 67 | 3.93% | 1,168 | 68.42% | 5 | 0.29% | | | -701 | -41.07% | 1,707 |
| Washington | 788 | 27.04% | 765 | 26.25% | 1,354 | 46.47% | 7 | 0.24% | | | -566 | -19.42% | 2,914 |
| Wayne | 488 | 62.01% | 58 | 7.37% | 91 | 11.56% | 1 | 0.13% | 149 | 18.93% | 397 | 50.44% | 787 |
| Webster | 299 | 53.30% | 192 | 34.22% | 70 | 12.48% | 0 | 0.00% | | | 107 | 19.07% | 561 |
| White | 390 | 48.75% | 92 | 11.50% | 309 | 38.63% | 9 | 1.13% | | | 81 | 10.13% | 800 |
| Whitfield | 1,021 | 61.14% | 264 | 15.81% | 360 | 21.56% | 25 | 1.50% | | | 661 | 39.58% | 1,670 |
| Wilcox | 712 | 76.72% | 199 | 21.44% | 17 | 1.83% | 0 | 0.00% | | | 513 | 55.28% | 928 |
| Wilkes | 1,622 | 90.61% | 5 | 0.28% | 157 | 8.77% | 6 | 0.34% | | | 1,465 | 81.84% | 1,790 |
| Wilkinson | 576 | 51.29% | 205 | 18.25% | 342 | 30.45% | 0 | 0.00% | | | 234 | 20.84% | 1,123 |
| Worth | 759 | 49.58% | 468 | 30.57% | 296 | 19.33% | 8 | 0.52% | | | 291 | 19.01% | 1,531 |
| Totals | 129,459 | 58.01% | 48,458 | 21.71% | 41,935 | 18.79% | 988 | 0.44% | 2,343 | 1.05% | 81,001 | 36.29% | 223,183 |

== See also ==
- United States presidential elections in Georgia

== Works cited ==
- Knoles, George (1971). The Presidential Campaign and Election of 1892. Stanford University Press. ISBN 040450969X.
