= Campbell County, Georgia =

Former county in Georgia, United States (1828–1931)

Coordinates: 33.56685°N 84.58150°W

Campbell County
- Former county
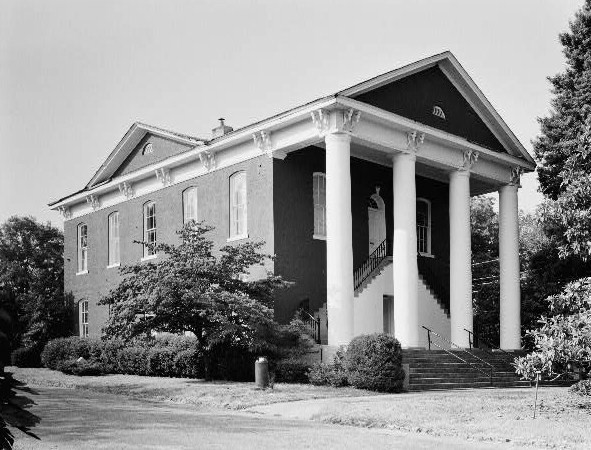
- Courthouse in 1980

- Location of the county within Georgia, United States
- Country: United States
- State: Georgia
- Established: 1828
- Merged: 1932
- Seat: Fairburn

Population (1920)
  - Total: 11,709

Campbell County was a county of the U.S. state of Georgia from 1828 (198 years ago) to 1931 (95 years ago). It was created by the state legislature on December 20, 1828, from land taken from Fayette, Coweta, and Carroll counties, and from the half of DeKalb County which became Fulton County soon afterward. Georgia's Cherokee Land Lottery of 1832 also added to the county. The county was named for Duncan G. Campbell, one of the U.S. commissioners responsible for the Treaty of Indian Springs.

The original county seat was Campbellton. In 1854 the Atlanta and West Point Railroad routed its tracks through Fairburn, Georgia instead, which flourished while Campbellton died out, and Fairburn became the county seat in 1870. The Campbell County Courthouse at Fairburn is listed on the National Register of Historic Places.

The northwestern half of Campbell (and a bit more of Carroll) became Douglas County in 1870, divided on October 17 at the Chattahoochee River. The remainder of Campbell County was ceded to Fulton County at the end of 1931, along with Milton County, Georgia. The legislation creating the merger was enacted on August 9, 1929, with Milton being added to the process in 1931.

Historical population
Census	Pop.	Note	%±
1830	3,323		—
1840	5,370		61.6%
1850	7,232		34.7%
1860	8,301		14.8%
1870	9,176		10.5%
1880	9,970		8.7%
1890	9,115		−8.6%
1900	9,518		4.4%
1910	10,874		14.2%
1920	11,709		7.7%
1930	9,903		−15.4%
U.S. Decennial Census

== Politics ==
United States presidential election results for Campbell County, Georgia
Year	Republican		Democratic		Third party(ies)	
Year	No.	%	No.	%	No.	%
1880	346	37.53%	576	62.47%	0	0.00%
1884	335	33.50%	665	66.50%	0	0.00%
1888	321	29.18%	778	70.73%	1	0.09%
1892	451	35.02%	466	36.18%	371	28.80%
1896	377	43.94%	434	50.58%	47	5.48%
1900	233	39.97%	350	60.03%	0	0.00%
1904	40	7.05%	308	54.32%	219	38.62%
1908	140	30.04%	210	45.06%	116	24.89%
1912	6	1.08%	443	80.11%	104	18.81%
1916	77	11.83%	508	78.03%	66	10.14%
1920	107	28.92%	263	71.08%	0	0.00%
1924	18	3.54%	477	93.90%	13	2.56%
1928	327	43.48%	425	56.52%	0	0.00%
