= 1916 United States presidential election in Georgia =

- November 7, 1916

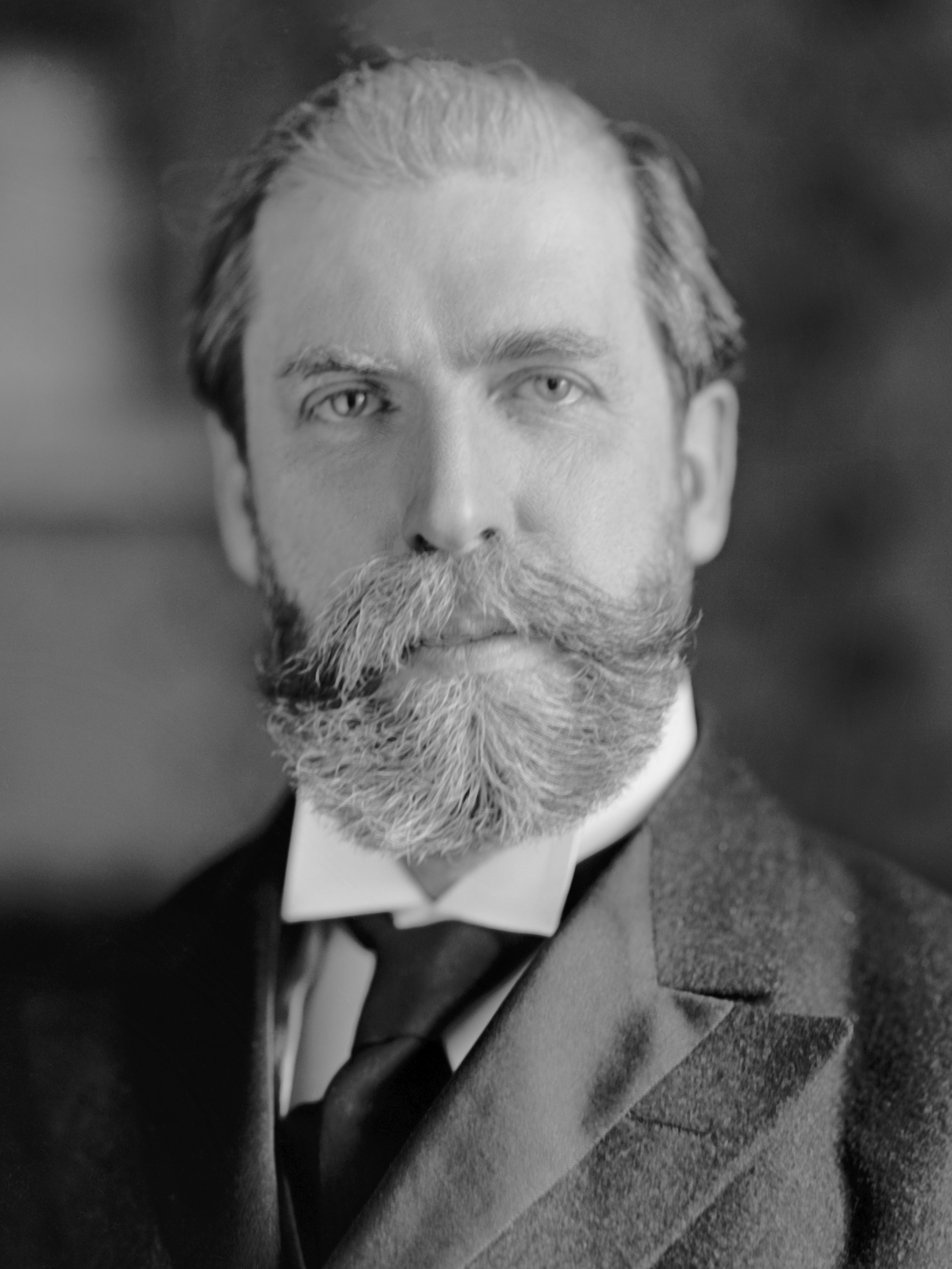
Nominee	Woodrow Wilson	No candidate	Charles Evans Hughes
Party	Democratic	Progressive	Republican
Home state	New Jersey	N/A	New York
Running mate	Thomas R. Marshall	John M. Parker	Charles W. Fairbanks
Electoral vote	14	0	0
Popular vote	127,754	20,692	11,294
Percentage	79.51%	12.88%	7.03%
County results
Wilson
30–40%
40–50%
50–60%
60–70%
70–80%
80–90%
90–100%
No Candidate
50–60%
Hughes
50–60%
President before election
Woodrow Wilson
Democratic
Elected President
Woodrow Wilson
Democratic

The 1916 United States presidential election in Georgia took place on November 7, 1916, as part of the wider United States presidential election. Voters chose 14 representatives, or electors, to the Electoral College, who voted for president and vice president.

With the exception of a handful of historically Unionist North Georgia counties – chiefly Fannin but also to a lesser extent Pickens, Gilmer and Towns – Georgia since the 1880s had been a one-party state dominated by the Democratic Party. Disfranchisement of almost all African-Americans and most poor whites had made the Republican Party virtually nonexistent outside of local governments in those few hill counties, and the national Democratic Party served as the guardian of white supremacy against a Republican Party historically associated with memories of Reconstruction. The only competitive elections were Democratic primaries, which state laws restricted to whites on the grounds of the Democratic Party being legally a private club.

== Results ==
1916 United States presidential election in Georgia
Party	Candidate	Votes	Percentage	Electoral votes
Democratic	Woodrow Wilson (incumbent)	127,754	79.51%	14
Progressive	No candidate	20,692	12.88%	0
Republican	Charles E. Hughes	11,294	7.03%	0
Socialist	Allan Benson	941 (Note: These Socialist votes were not separated by county and only given as a statewide total. They are included in the totals at the bottom of the county table.)	0.59%	0

=== Results by county ===
County	Thomas Woodrow Wilson Democratic		Charles Evans Hughes Republican		No candidate Progressive "Bull Moose"		Margin (Note: Because the Progressive slate finished second behind Wilson in Georgia as a whole, all margins given are Wilson vote minus Progressive vote and percentage margins Wilson percentage minus Progressive percentage unless stated otherwise for the county in question.)		Total votes cast
County	#	%	#	%	#	%	#	%	Total votes cast
Appling	413	71.95%	44	7.67%	117	20.38%	296	51.57%	574
Bacon	287	86.19%	46	13.81%	0	0.00%	241 (Note: In this county where the “Progressive” slate did run third behind Wilson and Hughes, margin given is Wilson vote minus Hughes vote and percentage margin Wilson percentage minus Hughes percentage.)	72.37%	333
Baker	435	82.23%	0	0.00%	94	17.77%	341	64.46%	529
Baldwin	579	84.40%	65	9.48%	42	6.12%	514	74.93%	686
Banks	989	80.21%	126	10.22%	118	9.57%	863	69.99%	1,233
Barrow	712	74.01%	148	15.38%	102	10.60%	564	58.63%	962
Bartow	1,325	76.02%	92	5.28%	326	18.70%	999	57.31%	1,743
Ben Hill	627	81.53%	8	1.04%	134	17.43%	493	64.11%	769
Berrien	2,102	96.29%	32	1.47%	49	2.24%	2,053	94.04%	2,183
Bibb	2,048	88.77%	201	8.71%	58	2.51%	1,847	80.06%	2,307
Bleckley	362	94.76%	6	1.57%	14	3.66%	348	91.10%	382
Brooks	969	88.33%	103	9.39%	25	2.28%	866	78.94%	1,097
Bryan	295	91.90%	17	5.30%	9	2.80%	278	86.60%	321
Bulloch	1,410	92.40%	29	1.90%	87	5.70%	1,323	86.70%	1,526
Burke	673	95.33%	19	2.69%	14	1.98%	654	92.63%	706
Butts	595	88.28%	52	7.72%	27	4.01%	543	80.56%	674
Calhoun	265	96.01%	9	3.26%	2	0.72%	256	92.75%	276
Camden	251	96.91%	4	1.54%	4	1.54%	247	95.37%	259
Campbell	508	78.03%	77	11.83%	66	10.14%	431	66.21%	651
Candler	442	94.04%	0	0.00%	28	5.96%	414	88.09%	470
Carroll	1,621	75.33%	118	5.48%	413	19.19%	1,208	56.13%	2,152
Catoosa	624	72.06%	32	3.70%	210	24.25%	414	47.81%	866
Charlton	169	72.84%	52	22.41%	11	4.74%	117	50.43%	232
Chatham	3,797	79.42%	368	7.70%	616	12.88%	3,181	66.53%	4,781
Chattahoochee	156	94.55%	5	3.03%	4	2.42%	151	91.52%	165
Chattooga	1,006	79.46%	20	1.58%	240	18.96%	766	60.51%	1,266
Cherokee	855	53.17%	292	18.16%	461	28.67%	394	24.50%	1,608
Clarke	1,036	87.80%	113	9.58%	31	2.63%	923	78.22%	1,180
Clay	225	92.21%	9	3.69%	10	4.10%	215	88.11%	244
Clayton	517	86.89%	3	0.50%	75	12.61%	442	74.29%	595
Clinch	374	85.98%	53	12.18%	8	1.84%	321	73.79%	435
Cobb	1,750	75.40%	137	5.90%	434	18.70%	1,316	56.70%	2,321
Coffee	2,091	93.35%	120	5.36%	29	1.29%	1,971	87.99%	2,240
Colquitt	1,305	85.35%	53	3.47%	171	11.18%	1,134	74.17%	1,529
Columbia	521	95.60%	6	1.10%	18	3.30%	503	92.29%	545
Coweta	1,179	91.40%	85	6.59%	26	2.02%	1,094	84.81%	1,290
Crawford	411	98.56%	2	0.48%	4	0.96%	407	97.60%	417
Crisp	577	84.73%	4	0.59%	100	14.68%	477	70.04%	681
Dade	616	88.89%	25	3.61%	52	7.50%	564	81.39%	693
Dawson	440	59.30%	273	36.79%	29	3.91%	167	22.51%	742
Decatur	1,147	88.37%	35	2.70%	116	8.94%	1,031	79.43%	1,298
DeKalb	1,690	88.99%	12	0.63%	197	10.37%	1,493	78.62%	1,899
Dodge	788	88.84%	64	7.22%	35	3.95%	724	81.62%	887
Dooly	737	95.96%	0	0.00%	31	4.04%	706	91.93%	768
Dougherty	836	93.93%	37	4.16%	17	1.91%	799	89.78%	890
Douglas	416	74.95%	61	10.99%	78	14.05%	338	60.90%	555
Early	442	97.14%	4	0.88%	9	1.98%	433	95.16%	455
Echols	173	100.00%	0	0.00%	0	0.00%	173	100.00%	173
Effingham	450	86.21%	8	1.53%	64	12.26%	386	73.95%	522
Elbert	1,756	90.56%	0	0.00%	183	9.44%	1,573	81.12%	1,939
Emanuel	1,500	83.61%	28	1.56%	266	14.83%	1,234	68.78%	1,794
Evans	334	78.40%	34	7.98%	58	13.62%	276	64.79%	426
Fannin	720	39.58%	166	9.13%	933	51.29%	-213	-11.71%	1,819
Fayette	494	83.87%	25	4.24%	70	11.88%	424	71.99%	589
Floyd	2,137	83.05%	50	1.94%	386	15.00%	1,751	68.05%	2,573
Forsyth	1,146	74.03%	166	10.72%	236	15.25%	910	58.79%	1,548
Franklin	1,540	86.03%	44	2.46%	206	11.51%	1,334	74.53%	1,790
Fulton	8,945	79.19%	1,311	11.61%	1,040	9.21%	7,634	67.58%	11,296
Gilmer	742	47.56%	258	16.54%	560	35.90%	182	11.67%	1,560
Glascock	126	43.45%	8	2.76%	156	53.79%	-30	-10.34%	290
Glynn	477	85.48%	45	8.06%	36	6.45%	432	77.42%	558
Gordon	1,010	70.04%	190	13.18%	242	16.78%	768	53.26%	1,442
Grady	675	84.59%	39	4.89%	84	10.53%	591	74.06%	798
Greene	676	76.64%	53	6.01%	153	17.35%	523	59.30%	882
Gwinnett	1,528	75.64%	222	10.99%	270	13.37%	1,258	62.28%	2,020
Habersham	1,032	69.45%	48	3.23%	406	27.32%	626	42.13%	1,486
Hall	1,662	76.59%	141	6.50%	367	16.91%	1,295	59.68%	2,170
Hancock	562	91.53%	30	4.89%	22	3.58%	532	86.64%	614
Haralson	837	47.75%	137	7.82%	779	44.44%	58	3.31%	1,753
Harris	550	91.06%	23	3.81%	31	5.13%	519	85.93%	604
Hart	750	74.33%	22	2.18%	237	23.49%	513	50.84%	1,009
Heard	439	85.74%	11	2.15%	62	12.11%	377	73.63%	512
Henry	868	83.86%	78	7.54%	89	8.60%	779	75.27%	1,035
Houston	806	92.64%	52	5.98%	12	1.38%	754	86.67%	870
Irwin	503	90.14%	31	5.56%	24	4.30%	472	84.59%	558
Jackson	1,185	87.26%	71	5.23%	102	7.51%	1,083	79.75%	1,358
Jasper	537	96.41%	14	2.51%	6	1.08%	523	93.90%	557
Jeff Davis	299	81.03%	14	3.79%	56	15.18%	243	65.85%	369
Jefferson	588	73.87%	63	7.91%	145	18.22%	443	55.65%	796
Jenkins	402	93.71%	7	1.63%	20	4.66%	382	89.04%	429
Johnson	715	80.79%	20	2.26%	150	16.95%	565	63.84%	885
Jones	398	92.34%	27	6.26%	6	1.39%	371	86.08%	431
Laurens	1,269	85.98%	64	4.34%	143	9.69%	1,126	76.29%	1,476
Lee	316	97.83%	3	0.93%	4	1.24%	312	96.59%	323
Liberty	245	65.51%	26	6.95%	103	27.54%	142	37.97%	374
Lincoln	333	84.52%	5	1.27%	56	14.21%	277	70.30%	394
Lowndes	1,870	92.67%	60	2.97%	88	4.36%	1,782	88.31%	2,018
Lumpkin	455	66.81%	55	8.08%	171	25.11%	284	41.70%	681
Macon	440	78.85%	21	3.76%	97	17.38%	343	61.47%	558
Madison	1,241	86.12%	19	1.32%	181	12.56%	1,060	73.56%	1,441
Marion	330	70.51%	42	8.97%	96	20.51%	234	50.00%	468
McDuffie	466	77.54%	70	11.65%	65	10.82%	396	65.89%	601
McIntosh	114	82.61%	20	14.49%	4	2.90%	94	68.12%	138
Meriwether	1,118	89.44%	36	2.88%	96	7.68%	1,022	81.76%	1,250
Miller	464	95.47%	15	3.09%	7	1.44%	449	92.39%	486
Milton	462	81.77%	11	1.95%	92	16.28%	370	65.49%	565
Mitchell	921	87.05%	41	3.88%	96	9.07%	825	77.98%	1,058
Monroe	721	86.04%	52	6.21%	65	7.76%	656	78.28%	838
Montgomery	1,002	92.01%	21	1.93%	66	6.06%	936	85.95%	1,089
Morgan	643	84.61%	59	7.76%	58	7.63%	584	76.84%	760
Murray	1,162	72.67%	301	18.82%	136	8.51%	861	53.85%	1,599
Muscogee	1,833	92.25%	110	5.54%	44	2.21%	1,723	86.71%	1,987
Newton	943	86.99%	102	9.41%	39	3.60%	841	77.58%	1,084
Oconee	497	74.96%	0	0.00%	166	25.04%	331	49.92%	663
Oglethorpe	657	91.63%	18	2.51%	42	5.86%	615	85.77%	717
Paulding	670	45.80%	10	0.68%	783	53.52%	-113	-7.72%	1,463
Pickens	497	39.41%	420	33.31%	344	27.28%	77	6.11%	1,261
Pierce	489	81.64%	85	14.19%	25	4.17%	404	67.45%	599
Pike	766	81.75%	65	6.94%	106	11.31%	660	70.44%	937
Polk	1,172	62.18%	0	0.00%	713	37.82%	459	24.35%	1,885
Pulaski	383	91.41%	13	3.10%	23	5.49%	360	85.92%	419
Putnam	462	98.30%	8	1.70%	0	0.00%	454	96.60%	470
Quitman	125	88.03%	2	1.41%	15	10.56%	110	77.46%	142
Rabun	633	70.26%	87	9.66%	181	20.09%	452	50.17%	901
Randolph	645	90.72%	43	6.05%	23	3.23%	602	84.67%	711
Richmond	2,708	78.04%	238	6.86%	524	15.10%	2,184	62.94%	3,470
Rockdale	490	79.16%	73	11.79%	56	9.05%	417	67.37%	619
Schley	222	85.71%	2	0.77%	35	13.51%	187	72.20%	259
Screven	625	82.35%	36	4.74%	98	12.91%	527	69.43%	759
Spalding	835	81.23%	41	3.99%	152	14.79%	683	66.44%	1,028
Stephens	500	86.96%	15	2.61%	60	10.43%	440	76.52%	575
Stewart	474	92.76%	23	4.50%	14	2.74%	451	88.26%	511
Sumter	1,065	93.18%	38	3.32%	40	3.50%	1,025	89.68%	1,143
Talbot	511	94.28%	17	3.14%	14	2.58%	494	91.14%	542
Taliaferro	255	92.39%	7	2.54%	14	5.07%	241	87.32%	276
Tattnall	574	69.74%	49	5.95%	200	24.30%	374	45.44%	823
Taylor	405	70.43%	57	9.91%	113	19.65%	292	50.78%	575
Telfair	773	93.47%	25	3.02%	29	3.51%	744	89.96%	827
Terrell	677	92.74%	40	5.48%	13	1.78%	637	87.26%	730
Thomas	1,298	85.79%	42	2.78%	173	11.43%	1,125	74.36%	1,513
Tift	1,034	82.79%	42	3.36%	173	13.85%	861	68.94%	1,249
Toombs	425	78.13%	33	6.07%	86	15.81%	339	62.32%	544
Towns	358	42.37%	481	56.92%	6	0.71%	-123	-14.56%	845
Troup	1,227	81.53%	38	2.52%	240	15.95%	987	65.58%	1,505
Turner	400	55.79%	145	20.22%	172	23.99%	228	31.80%	717
Twiggs	365	91.25%	20	5.00%	15	3.75%	345	86.25%	400
Union	532	50.43%	523	49.57%	0	0.00%	9	0.85%	1,055
Upson	734	72.60%	18	1.78%	259	25.62%	475	46.98%	1,011
Walker	1,883	71.82%	439	16.74%	300	11.44%	1,444	55.07%	2,622
Walton	1,305	88.24%	83	5.61%	91	6.15%	1,214	82.08%	1,479
Ware	1,066	84.74%	133	10.57%	59	4.69%	933	74.17%	1,258
Warren	292	68.22%	47	10.98%	89	20.79%	203	47.43%	428
Washington	954	84.57%	18	1.60%	156	13.83%	798	70.74%	1,128
Wayne	460	89.49%	29	5.64%	25	4.86%	431	83.85%	514
Webster	248	87.63%	20	7.07%	15	5.30%	228	80.57%	283
Wheeler	372	83.97%	31	7.00%	40	9.03%	332	74.94%	443
White	639	75.62%	6	0.71%	200	23.67%	439	51.95%	845
Whitfield	1,093	60.19%	16	0.88%	707	38.93%	386	21.26%	1,816
Wilcox	590	89.39%	12	1.82%	58	8.79%	532	80.61%	660
Wilkes	785	91.92%	17	1.99%	52	6.09%	733	85.83%	854
Wilkinson	371	88.54%	28	6.68%	20	4.77%	343	81.86%	419
Worth	690	87.45%	31	3.93%	68	8.62%	622	78.83%	789
Totals	127,754	79.51%	11,294	7.03%	20,692	12.88%	107,062	66.63%	160,681

== See also ==
- United States presidential elections in Georgia
