= 1888 United States presidential election in Georgia =

- November 6, 1888
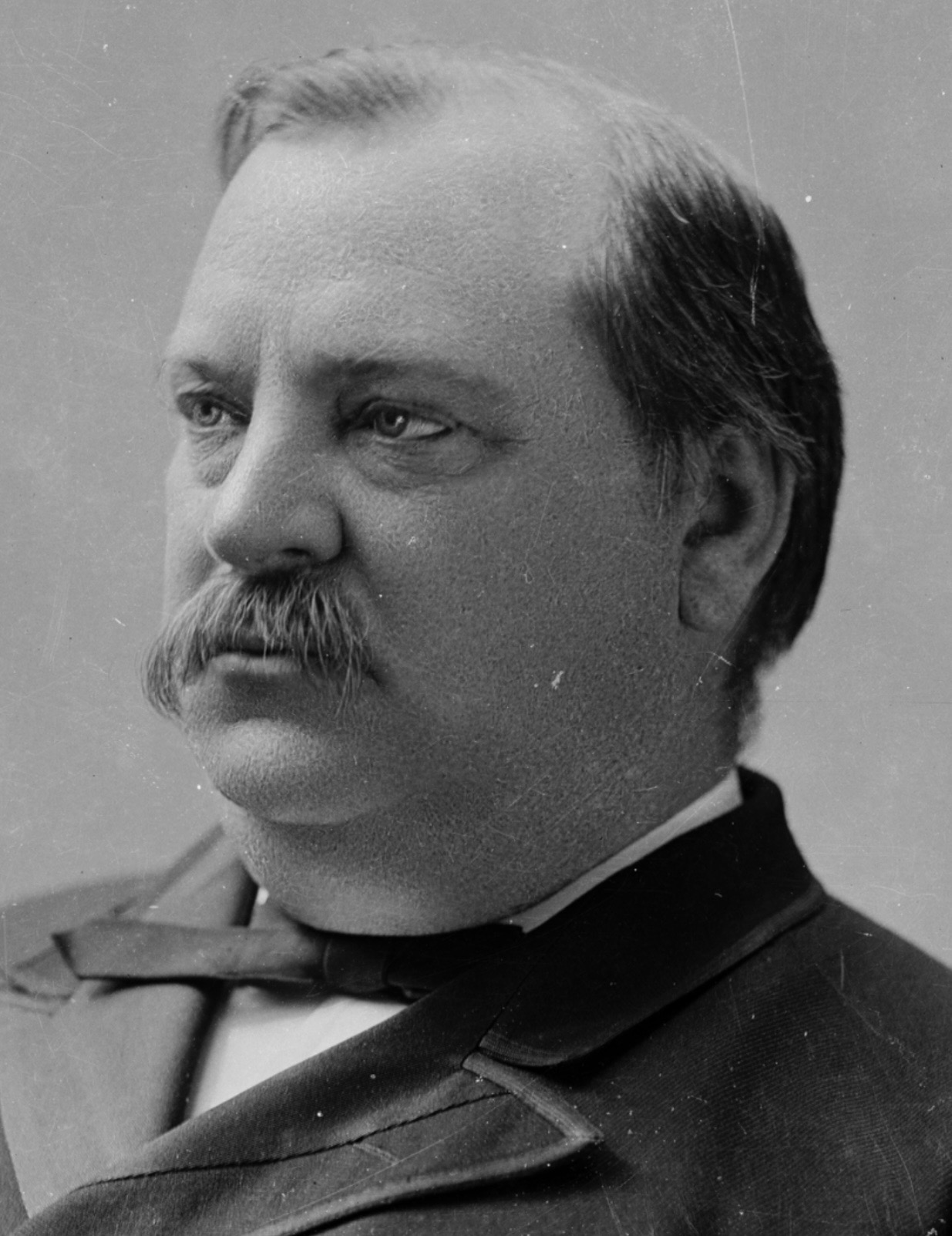

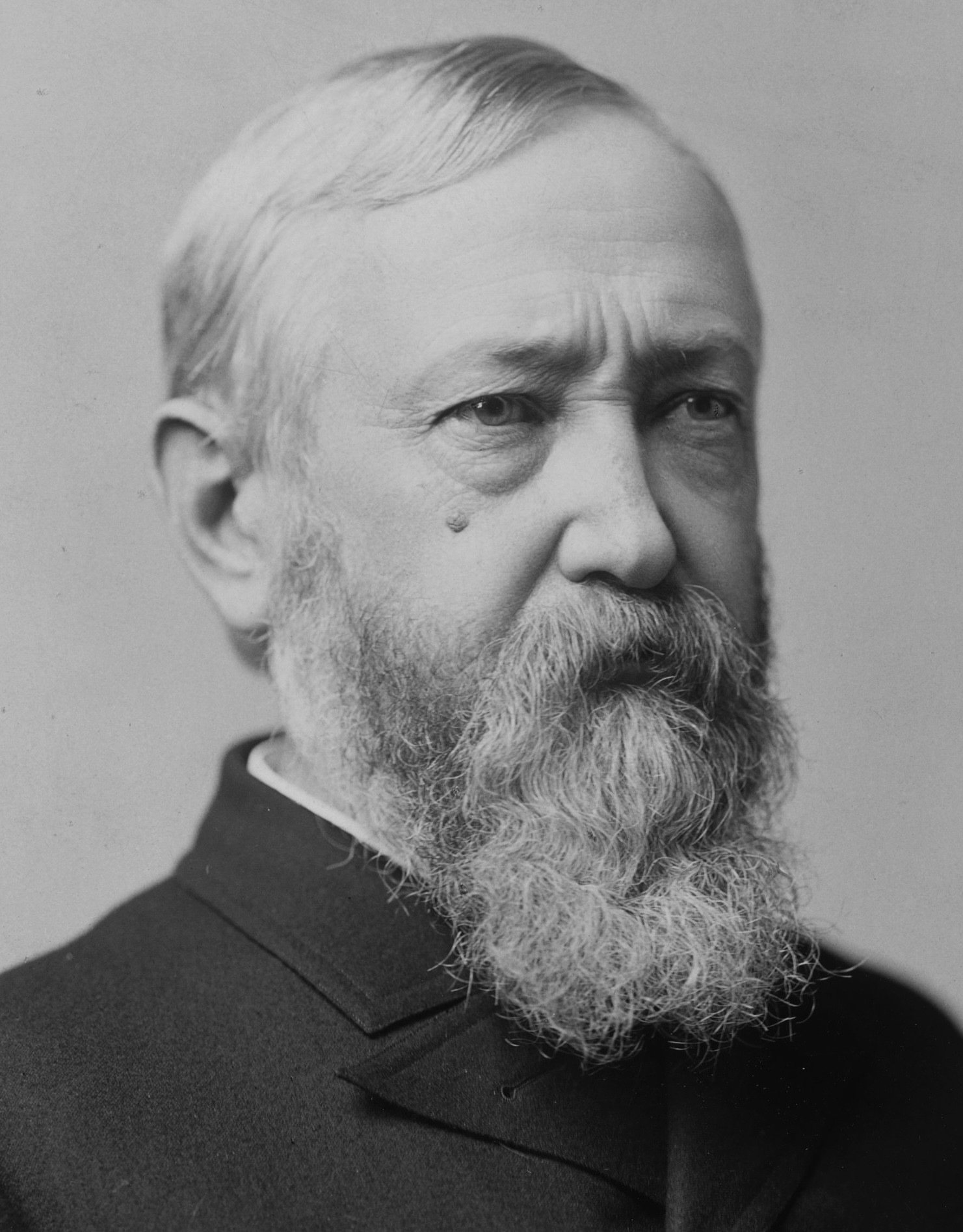
Nominee	Grover Cleveland	Benjamin Harrison
Party	Democratic	Republican
Home state	New York	Indiana
Running mate	Allen G. Thurman	Levi P. Morton
Electoral vote	12	0
Popular vote	100,493	40,499
Percentage	70.31%	28.33%
County results
Cleveland
40–50%
50–60%
60–70%
70–80%
80–90%
90–100%
Harrison
50–60%
60–70%
70–80%
President before election
Grover Cleveland
Democratic
Elected President
Benjamin Harrison
Republican

The 1888 United States presidential election in Georgia took place on November 6, 1888, as part of the wider United States presidential election. Voters chose 12 representatives, or electors, to the Electoral College, who voted for president and vice president.

Following Reconstruction, Georgia would be the first former Confederate state to substantially disenfranchise its newly enfranchised freedmen and many poor whites, doing so in the early 1870s. This largely limited the Republican Party to a few North Georgia counties with substantial Civil War Unionist sentiment – chiefly Fannin but also to a lesser extent Pickens, Gilmer and Towns – and in presidential elections to a small number of counties where blacks were not fully disenfranchised. The Democratic Party served as the guardian of white supremacy against a Republican Party historically associated with memories of Reconstruction, and the main competition became Democratic primaries, which were restricted to whites on the grounds of the Democratic Party being legally a private club. This restriction was done by local county laws, but combined with the highly efficacious cumulative poll tax introduced in 1877 meant that turnout declined steadily throughout the 1880s, unlike any other former Confederate state except South Carolina.

Despite economic problems in the mountain counties due to deflation produced by the gold standard and large-scale government spending reductions by the “Redeemer” Democrats, voter turnout, especially for opposition parties, would maintain its poll tax-driven decline until the Populist movement, which did not affect the 1888 election. Consequently, Cleveland would gain five percent on his 1884 percentage in Georgia as opposition turnout fell by one-seventh.

== Results ==
1888 United States presidential election in Georgia
Party	Candidate	Votes	Percentage	Electoral votes
Democratic	Grover Cleveland (incumbent)	100,493	70.31%	12
Republican	Benjamin Harrison	40,499	28.33%	0
Prohibition	Clinton B. Fisk	1,808	1.26%	0
Union Labor	Alson Streeter	136 (Note: These Streeter votes were not separated by county but given only as a state-wide total.)	0.10%	0

=== Results by county ===
County	Stephen Grover Cleveland Democratic		Benjamin Harrison Republican		Clinton Bowen Fisk Prohibition		Margin		Total votes cast
County	#	%	#	%	#	%	#	%	Total votes cast
Appling	531	70.33%	219	29.01%	5	0.66%	312	41.32%	755
Baker	346	88.95%	43	11.05%	0	0.00%	303	77.89%	389
Baldwin	403	59.18%	271	39.79%	7	1.03%	132	19.38%	681
Banks	807	78.27%	210	20.37%	14	1.36%	597	57.90%	1,031
Bartow	916	71.01%	290	22.48%	84	6.51%	626	48.53%	1,290
Berrien	721	97.96%	11	1.49%	4	0.54%	710	96.47%	736
Bibb	2,215	64.11%	1,121	32.45%	119	3.44%	1,094	31.66%	3,455
Brooks	828	58.27%	580	40.82%	13	0.91%	248	17.45%	1,421
Bryan	214	94.27%	12	5.29%	1	0.44%	202	88.99%	227
Bulloch	1,061	96.02%	42	3.80%	2	0.18%	1,019	92.22%	1,105
Burke	684	73.39%	248	26.61%	0	0.00%	436	46.78%	932
Butts	603	68.91%	245	28.00%	27	3.09%	358	40.91%	875
Calhoun	451	100.00%	0	0.00%	0	0.00%	451	100.00%	451
Camden	188	36.86%	317	62.16%	5	0.98%	-129	-25.29%	510
Campbell	778	70.73%	321	29.18%	1	0.09%	457	41.55%	1,100
Carroll	1,710	80.89%	349	16.51%	55	2.60%	1,361	64.38%	2,114
Catoosa	428	77.12%	106	19.10%	21	3.78%	322	58.02%	555
Charlton	113	65.32%	58	33.53%	2	1.16%	55	31.79%	173
Chatham	3,920	73.52%	1,355	25.41%	57	1.07%	2,565	48.11%	5,332
Chattahoochee	145	86.83%	22	13.17%	0	0.00%	123	73.65%	167
Chattooga	638	77.80%	180	21.95%	2	0.24%	458	55.85%	820
Cherokee	1,575	76.72%	459	22.36%	19	0.93%	1,116	54.36%	2,053
Clarke	801	54.60%	660	44.99%	6	0.41%	141	9.61%	1,467
Clay	554	65.80%	287	34.09%	1	0.12%	267	31.71%	842
Clayton	604	72.95%	224	27.05%	0	0.00%	380	45.89%	828
Clinch	435	78.52%	115	20.76%	4	0.72%	320	57.76%	554
Cobb	1,143	73.18%	391	25.03%	28	1.79%	752	48.14%	1,562
Coffee	294	72.06%	110	26.96%	4	0.98%	184	45.10%	408
Colquitt	255	97.70%	4	1.53%	2	0.77%	251	96.17%	261
Columbia	397	98.51%	0	0.00%	6	1.49%	391 (Note: In this county where Fisk ran second ahead of Harrison, margin given is Cleveland vote minus Fisk vote and percentage margin Cleveland percentage minus Fisk percentage.)	97.02%	403
Coweta	1,476	59.71%	990	40.05%	6	0.24%	486	19.66%	2,472
Crawford	442	94.24%	26	5.54%	1	0.21%	416	88.70%	469
Dade	465	83.48%	89	15.98%	3	0.54%	376	67.50%	557
Dawson	513	59.38%	340	39.35%	11	1.27%	173	20.02%	864
DeKalb	1,021	75.80%	313	23.24%	13	0.97%	708	52.56%	1,347
Decatur	1,287	72.75%	482	27.25%	0	0.00%	805	45.51%	1,769
Dodge	496	54.27%	406	44.42%	12	1.31%	90	9.85%	914
Dooly	787	67.04%	386	32.88%	1	0.09%	401	34.16%	1,174
Dougherty	815	78.21%	222	21.31%	5	0.48%	593	56.91%	1,042
Douglas	493	76.08%	151	23.30%	4	0.62%	342	52.78%	648
Early	467	61.85%	288	38.15%	0	0.00%	179	23.71%	755
Echols	150	75.76%	43	21.72%	5	2.53%	107	54.04%	198
Effingham	362	64.07%	189	33.45%	14	2.48%	173	30.62%	565
Elbert	774	95.67%	11	1.36%	24	2.97%	750	92.71%	809
Emanuel	658	95.50%	30	4.35%	1	0.15%	628	91.15%	689
Fannin	374	34.89%	692	64.55%	6	0.56%	-318	-29.66%	1,072
Fayette	690	77.09%	204	22.79%	1	0.11%	486	54.30%	895
Floyd	1,145	65.50%	585	33.47%	18	1.03%	560	32.04%	1,748
Forsyth	1,579	87.72%	209	11.61%	12	0.67%	1,370	76.11%	1,800
Franklin	606	79.84%	121	15.94%	32	4.22%	485	63.90%	759
Fulton	2,750	53.43%	2,164	42.04%	233	4.53%	586	11.39%	5,147
Gilmer	556	49.60%	543	48.44%	22	1.96%	13	1.16%	1,121
Glascock	290	86.57%	45	13.43%	0	0.00%	245	73.13%	335
Glynn	601	49.59%	582	48.02%	29	2.39%	19	1.57%	1,212
Gordon	852	84.61%	119	11.82%	36	3.57%	733	72.79%	1,007
Greene	803	52.38%	714	46.58%	16	1.04%	89	5.81%	1,533
Gwinnett	2,004	90.56%	186	8.40%	23	1.04%	1,818	82.15%	2,213
Habersham	830	80.82%	188	18.31%	9	0.88%	642	62.51%	1,027
Hall	2,170	87.29%	274	11.02%	42	1.69%	1,896	76.27%	2,486
Hancock	596	77.00%	177	22.87%	1	0.13%	419	54.13%	774
Haralson	493	82.86%	93	15.63%	9	1.51%	400	67.23%	595
Harris	1,020	61.22%	633	38.00%	13	0.78%	387	23.23%	1,666
Hart	674	86.97%	80	10.32%	21	2.71%	594	76.65%	775
Heard	629	76.43%	188	22.84%	6	0.73%	441	53.58%	823
Henry	1,136	67.90%	512	30.60%	25	1.49%	624	37.30%	1,673
Houston	949	66.93%	466	32.86%	3	0.21%	483	34.06%	1,418
Irwin	245	88.77%	31	11.23%	0	0.00%	214	77.54%	276
Jackson	2,180	80.80%	506	18.75%	12	0.44%	1,674	62.05%	2,698
Jasper	588	76.86%	177	23.14%	0	0.00%	411	53.73%	765
Jefferson	816	85.80%	130	13.67%	5	0.53%	686	72.13%	951
Johnson	379	73.45%	124	24.03%	13	2.52%	255	49.42%	516
Jones	531	54.41%	443	45.39%	2	0.20%	88	9.02%	976
Laurens	839	78.41%	222	20.75%	9	0.84%	617	57.66%	1,070
Lee	178	30.48%	405	69.35%	1	0.17%	-227	-38.87%	584
Liberty	477	39.75%	708	59.00%	15	1.25%	-231	-19.25%	1,200
Lincoln	446	99.78%	0	0.00%	1	0.22%	445	99.55%	447
Lowndes	767	53.75%	643	45.06%	17	1.19%	124	8.69%	1,427
Lumpkin	440	57.14%	317	41.17%	13	1.69%	123	15.97%	770
Macon	683	68.03%	320	31.87%	1	0.10%	363	36.16%	1,004
Madison	583	80.19%	144	19.81%	0	0.00%	439	60.39%	727
Marion	543	85.11%	94	14.73%	1	0.16%	449	70.38%	638
McDuffie	389	99.23%	3	0.77%	0	0.00%	386	98.47%	392
McIntosh	192	22.20%	673	77.80%	0	0.00%	-481	-55.61%	865
Meriwether	991	68.16%	452	31.09%	11	0.76%	539	37.07%	1,454
Miller	170	94.97%	9	5.03%	0	0.00%	161	89.94%	179
Milton	895	93.42%	56	5.85%	7	0.73%	839	87.58%	958
Mitchell	650	59.96%	433	39.94%	1	0.09%	217	20.02%	1,084
Monroe	1,420	75.25%	466	24.70%	1	0.05%	954	50.56%	1,887
Montgomery	480	71.54%	178	26.53%	13	1.94%	302	45.01%	671
Morgan	506	70.28%	210	29.17%	4	0.56%	296	41.11%	720
Murray	524	71.00%	199	26.96%	15	2.03%	325	44.04%	738
Muscogee	1,107	63.84%	611	35.24%	16	0.92%	496	28.60%	1,734
Newton	788	64.64%	398	32.65%	33	2.71%	390	31.99%	1,219
Oconee	380	70.76%	156	29.05%	1	0.19%	224	41.71%	537
Oglethorpe	550	98.92%	4	0.72%	2	0.36%	546	98.20%	556
Paulding	592	75.41%	185	23.57%	8	1.02%	407	51.85%	785
Pickens	368	31.78%	788	68.05%	2	0.17%	-420	-36.27%	1,158
Pierce	366	64.66%	198	34.98%	2	0.35%	168	29.68%	566
Pike	1,030	64.82%	514	32.35%	45	2.83%	516	32.47%	1,589
Polk	587	55.17%	450	42.29%	27	2.54%	137	12.88%	1,064
Pulaski	1,107	78.68%	298	21.18%	2	0.14%	809	57.50%	1,407
Putnam	511	99.80%	0	0.00%	1	0.20%	510	99.61%	512
Quitman	327	72.67%	122	27.11%	1	0.22%	205	45.56%	450
Rabun	386	88.13%	43	9.82%	9	2.05%	343	78.31%	438
Randolph	594	63.19%	327	34.79%	19	2.02%	267	28.40%	940
Richmond	808	85.14%	113	11.91%	28	2.95%	695	73.23%	949
Rockdale	568	66.51%	280	32.79%	6	0.70%	288	33.72%	854
Schley	355	60.37%	233	39.63%	0	0.00%	122	20.75%	588
Screven	1,161	82.40%	243	17.25%	5	0.35%	918	65.15%	1,409
Spalding	1,039	68.94%	448	29.73%	20	1.33%	591	39.22%	1,507
Stewart	662	82.54%	139	17.33%	1	0.12%	523	65.21%	802
Sumter	940	58.93%	652	40.88%	3	0.19%	288	18.06%	1,595
Talbot	575	59.34%	389	40.14%	5	0.52%	186	19.20%	969
Taliaferro	391	65.71%	200	33.61%	4	0.67%	191	32.10%	595
Tattnall	534	83.70%	102	15.99%	2	0.31%	432	67.71%	638
Taylor	559	80.32%	123	17.67%	14	2.01%	436	62.64%	696
Telfair	493	64.95%	234	30.83%	32	4.22%	259	34.12%	759
Terrell	673	74.61%	228	25.28%	1	0.11%	445	49.33%	902
Thomas	1,465	63.15%	838	36.12%	17	0.73%	627	27.03%	2,320
Towns	275	49.64%	277	50.00%	2	0.36%	-2	-0.36%	554
Troup	1,242	73.75%	435	25.83%	7	0.42%	807	47.92%	1,684
Twiggs	299	65.00%	157	34.13%	4	0.87%	142	30.87%	460
Union	547	55.36%	440	44.53%	1	0.10%	107	10.83%	988
Upson	977	73.85%	345	26.08%	1	0.08%	632	47.77%	1,323
Walker	718	72.53%	260	26.26%	12	1.21%	458	46.26%	990
Walton	767	74.98%	235	22.97%	21	2.05%	532	52.00%	1,023
Ware	369	64.51%	186	32.52%	17	2.97%	183	31.99%	572
Warren	545	84.10%	100	15.43%	3	0.46%	445	68.67%	648
Washington	1,351	69.78%	572	29.55%	13	0.67%	779	40.24%	1,936
Wayne	317	67.88%	137	29.34%	13	2.78%	180	38.54%	467
Webster	290	56.42%	224	43.58%	0	0.00%	66	12.84%	514
White	494	77.31%	139	21.75%	6	0.94%	355	55.56%	639
Whitfield	837	63.41%	421	31.89%	62	4.70%	416	31.52%	1,320
Wilcox	357	82.45%	73	16.86%	3	0.69%	284	65.59%	433
Wilkes	683	97.85%	0	0.00%	15	2.15%	668	95.70%	698
Wilkinson	339	82.48%	69	16.79%	3	0.73%	270	65.69%	411
Worth	547	72.26%	179	23.65%	31	4.10%	368	48.61%	757
Totals	100,493	70.37%	40,499	28.36%	1,808	1.27%	59,994	42.01%	142,800

== See also ==
- United States presidential elections in Georgia
