= 1912 United States presidential election in Georgia =

- November 5, 1912

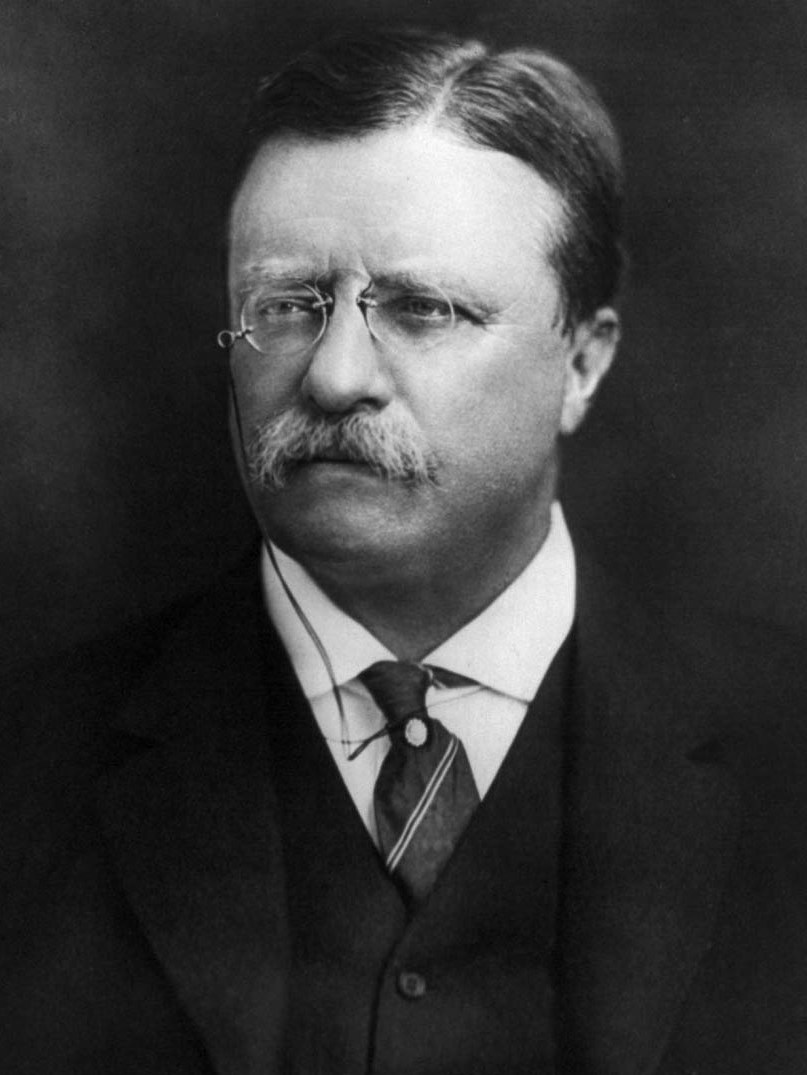
Nominee	Woodrow Wilson	Theodore Roosevelt
Party	Democratic	Progressive
Home state	New Jersey	New York
Running mate	Thomas R. Marshall	Hiram Johnson
Electoral vote	14	0
Popular vote	93,087	21,985
Percentage	76.63%	18.10%
County results
Wilson
40–50%
50–60%
60–70%
70–80%
80–90%
90–100%
Roosevelt
40–50%
50–60%
60–70%
President before election
William Howard Taft
Republican
Elected President
Woodrow Wilson
Democratic

The 1912 United States presidential election in Georgia took place on November 5, 1912, as part of the 1912 United States presidential election. Georgia voters chose 14 representatives, or electors, to the Electoral College, who voted for president and vice president. With the exception of a handful of historically Unionist North Georgia counties – chiefly Fannin but also to a lesser extent Pickens, Gilmer and Towns – Georgia since the 1880s had been a one-party state dominated by the Democratic Party. Disfranchisement of almost all African-Americans and most poor whites had made the Republican Party virtually nonexistent outside of local governments in those few hill counties, and the national Democratic Party served as the guardian of white supremacy against a Republican Party historically associated with memories of Reconstruction. The only competitive elections were Democratic primaries, which state laws restricted to whites on the grounds of the Democratic Party being legally a private club.

In 1908 the Republican Party had made some gains in the South due to opposition by developing manufacturers to William Jennings Bryan’s populism, and by nominee William Howard Taft’s willingness to accept black disfranchisement. This resulted in the GOP carrying twelve secessionist upcountry counties that had never gone Republican before. The split in the GOP after the 1908 election prevented any maintenance of these gains – which had seen Bryan’s 1908 performance as the poorest by a Democrat in Georgia until pro-civil rights Lyndon B. Johnson lost the state in 1964 – but Roosevelt did hold on to some of the new Republican vote from 1908, consequently finishing far ahead of regular Republican and incumbent President Taft.

Georgia was won by the New Jersey Governor Woodrow Wilson (D–New Jersey), running with governor of Indiana Thomas R. Marshall, with 76.63 percent of the popular vote against the 26th president of the United States Theodore Roosevelt (P–New York), running with governor of California Hiram Johnson, with 18.10% of the popular vote.

== Results ==
1912 United States presidential election in Georgia
Party	Candidate	Votes	%
Democratic	Woodrow Wilson	93,087	76.63%
Progressive	Theodore Roosevelt	21,985	18.10%
Republican	William Howard Taft (incumbent)	5,191	4.27%
Socialist	Eugene V. Debs	1,058	0.87%
Prohibition	Eugene W. Chafin	149	0.12%
Total votes		121,470	100%

=== Results by county ===
County	Thomas Woodrow Wilson Democratic		William Howard Taft Republican		Theodore Roosevelt Progressive "Bull Moose"		Various candidates Other parties		Margin (Note: Because Roosevelt finished ahead of Taft in Georgia as a whole, all margins given are Wilson minus Roosevelt unless stated in the total for the county in question.)		Total votes cast
County	#	%	#	%	#	%	#	%	#	%	Total votes cast
Appling	381	59.72%	94	14.73%	150	23.51%	13	2.04%	231	36.21%	638
Baker	180	93.75%	0	0.00%	12	6.25%	0	0.00%	168	87.50%	192
Baldwin	621	89.74%	24	3.47%	47	6.79%	0	0.00%	574	82.95%	692
Banks	274	54.15%	17	3.36%	215	42.49%	0	0.00%	59	11.66%	506
Bartow	1,017	60.86%	93	5.57%	561	33.57%	0	0.00%	456	27.29%	1,671
Ben Hill	535	64.30%	34	4.09%	263	31.61%	0	0.00%	272	32.69%	832
Berrien	709	86.67%	35	4.28%	70	8.56%	4	0.49%	639	78.12%	818
Bibb	2,526	91.19%	122	4.40%	90	3.25%	32	1.16%	2,404 (Note: In this county where Taft did run second ahead of Roosevelt, margin given is Wilson vote minus Taft vote and percentage margin Wilson percentage minus Taft percentage.)	86.79%	2,770
Brooks	695	89.79%	37	4.78%	42	5.43%	0	0.00%	653	84.37%	774
Bryan	236	86.13%	23	8.39%	15	5.47%	0	0.00%	213	77.74%	274
Bulloch	932	93.48%	17	1.71%	44	4.41%	4	0.40%	888	89.07%	997
Burke	440	90.72%	22	4.54%	22	4.54%	1	0.21%	418	86.19%	485
Butts	490	85.96%	29	5.09%	49	8.60%	2	0.35%	441	77.37%	570
Calhoun	328	96.76%	5	1.47%	6	1.77%	0	0.00%	322	94.99%	339
Camden	219	98.21%	2	0.90%	2	0.90%	0	0.00%	217	97.31%	223
Campbell	443	80.11%	6	1.08%	104	18.81%	0	0.00%	339	61.30%	553
Carroll	1,192	69.30%	81	4.71%	431	25.06%	16	0.93%	761	44.24%	1,720
Catoosa	286	60.34%	63	13.29%	125	26.37%	0	0.00%	161	33.97%	474
Charlton	150	67.26%	23	10.31%	48	21.52%	2	0.90%	102	45.74%	223
Chatham	3,274	84.36%	238	6.13%	332	8.55%	37	0.95%	2,942	75.81%	3,881
Chattahoochee	137	91.95%	1	0.67%	11	7.38%	0	0.00%	126	84.56%	149
Chattooga	578	66.59%	69	7.95%	220	25.35%	1	0.12%	358	41.24%	868
Cherokee	603	44.93%	21	1.56%	710	52.91%	8	0.60%	-107	-7.97%	1,342
Clarke	950	86.44%	66	6.01%	81	7.37%	2	0.18%	869	79.07%	1,099
Clay	369	93.65%	8	2.03%	17	4.31%	0	0.00%	352	89.34%	394
Clayton	443	79.11%	3	0.54%	113	20.18%	1	0.18%	330	58.93%	560
Clinch	283	83.24%	48	14.12%	9	2.65%	0	0.00%	235	69.12%	340
Cobb	1,519	75.76%	41	2.04%	442	22.04%	3	0.15%	1,077	53.72%	2,005
Coffee	895	87.32%	28	2.73%	85	8.29%	17	1.66%	810	79.02%	1,025
Colquitt	699	56.88%	8	0.65%	506	41.17%	16	1.30%	193	15.70%	1,229
Columbia	234	87.97%	2	0.75%	30	11.28%	0	0.00%	204	76.69%	266
Coweta	1,044	92.80%	35	3.11%	46	4.09%	0	0.00%	998	88.71%	1,125
Crawford	249	97.65%	1	0.39%	3	1.18%	2	0.78%	246	96.47%	255
Crisp	644	91.87%	12	1.71%	45	6.42%	0	0.00%	599	85.45%	701
Dade	243	75.00%	18	5.56%	44	13.58%	19	5.86%	199	61.42%	324
Dawson	170	47.49%	23	6.42%	161	44.97%	4	1.12%	9	2.51%	358
Decatur	1,150	71.12%	52	3.22%	378	23.38%	37	2.29%	772	47.74%	1,617
DeKalb	837	84.46%	44	4.44%	65	6.56%	45	4.54%	772	77.90%	991
Dodge	637	86.08%	12	1.62%	28	3.78%	63	8.51%	609	82.30%	740
Dooly	608	94.12%	5	0.77%	33	5.11%	0	0.00%	575	89.01%	646
Dougherty	731	94.81%	21	2.72%	19	2.46%	0	0.00%	710	92.09%	771
Douglas	266	45.01%	18	3.05%	307	51.95%	0	0.00%	-41	-6.94%	591
Early	501	87.74%	7	1.23%	27	4.73%	36	6.30%	474	83.01%	571
Echols	144	97.30%	0	0.00%	4	2.70%	0	0.00%	140	94.59%	148
Effingham	343	95.81%	5	1.40%	10	2.79%	0	0.00%	333	93.02%	358
Elbert	882	77.85%	13	1.15%	238	21.01%	0	0.00%	644	56.84%	1,133
Emanuel	715	81.81%	22	2.52%	129	14.76%	8	0.92%	586	67.05%	874
Fannin	451	48.81%	168	18.18%	305	33.01%	0	0.00%	146	15.80%	924
Fayette	369	77.20%	12	2.51%	95	19.87%	2	0.42%	274	57.32%	478
Floyd	1,837	80.75%	63	2.77%	374	16.44%	1	0.04%	1,463	64.31%	2,275
Forsyth	235	56.90%	15	3.63%	163	39.47%	0	0.00%	72	17.43%	413
Franklin	694	66.03%	26	2.47%	331	31.49%	0	0.00%	363	34.54%	1,051
Fulton	7,317	75.78%	509	5.27%	1,696	17.57%	133	1.38%	5,621	58.22%	9,655
Gilmer	488	74.28%	52	7.91%	116	17.66%	1	0.15%	372	56.62%	657
Glascock	101	57.39%	3	1.70%	72	40.91%	0	0.00%	29	16.48%	176
Glynn	470	88.51%	16	3.01%	30	5.65%	15	2.82%	440	82.86%	531
Gordon	597	45.96%	52	4.00%	650	50.04%	0	0.00%	-53	-4.08%	1,299
Grady	453	79.06%	21	3.66%	98	17.10%	1	0.17%	355	61.95%	573
Greene	525	76.64%	10	1.46%	150	21.90%	0	0.00%	375	54.74%	685
Gwinnett	997	60.68%	55	3.35%	590	35.91%	1	0.06%	407	24.77%	1,643
Habersham	497	58.54%	42	4.95%	310	36.51%	0	0.00%	187	22.03%	849
Hall	1,145	74.01%	116	7.50%	275	17.78%	11	0.71%	870	56.24%	1,547
Hancock	549	91.50%	12	2.00%	39	6.50%	0	0.00%	510	85.00%	600
Haralson	384	34.13%	19	1.69%	701	62.31%	21	1.87%	-317	-28.18%	1,125
Harris	585	94.66%	4	0.65%	28	4.53%	1	0.16%	557	90.13%	618
Hart	484	61.27%	15	1.90%	291	36.84%	0	0.00%	193	24.43%	790
Heard	326	81.09%	11	2.74%	65	16.17%	0	0.00%	261	64.93%	402
Henry	536	79.06%	15	2.21%	127	18.73%	0	0.00%	409	60.32%	678
Houston	760	95.00%	24	3.00%	16	2.00%	0	0.00%	736	92.00%	800
Irwin	428	89.17%	6	1.25%	45	9.38%	1	0.21%	383	79.79%	480
Jackson	1,108	65.02%	45	2.64%	551	32.34%	0	0.00%	557	32.69%	1,704
Jasper	644	96.99%	12	1.81%	8	1.20%	0	0.00%	632	95.18%	664
Jeff Davis	268	79.06%	19	5.60%	52	15.34%	0	0.00%	216	63.72%	339
Jefferson	416	71.85%	8	1.38%	153	26.42%	2	0.35%	263	45.42%	579
Jenkins	279	90.88%	13	4.23%	15	4.89%	0	0.00%	264	85.99%	307
Johnson	285	71.25%	23	5.75%	92	23.00%	0	0.00%	193	48.25%	400
Jones	426	93.42%	27	5.92%	3	0.66%	0	0.00%	399	87.50%	456
Laurens	1,118	89.44%	26	2.08%	106	8.48%	0	0.00%	1,012	80.96%	1,250
Lee	210	93.33%	9	4.00%	6	2.67%	0	0.00%	201	89.33%	225
Liberty	251	70.31%	29	8.12%	77	21.57%	0	0.00%	174	48.74%	357
Lincoln	253	90.68%	0	0.00%	26	9.32%	0	0.00%	227	81.36%	279
Lowndes	847	91.87%	24	2.60%	35	3.80%	16	1.74%	812	88.07%	922
Lumpkin	279	65.34%	29	6.79%	119	27.87%	0	0.00%	160	37.47%	427
Macon	411	79.81%	19	3.69%	85	16.50%	0	0.00%	326	63.30%	515
Madison	564	78.01%	13	1.80%	146	20.19%	0	0.00%	418	57.81%	723
Marion	233	77.41%	17	5.65%	51	16.94%	0	0.00%	182	60.47%	301
McDuffie	271	70.03%	9	2.33%	106	27.39%	1	0.26%	165	42.64%	387
McIntosh	118	92.19%	2	1.56%	8	6.25%	0	0.00%	110	85.94%	128
Meriwether	882	88.20%	26	2.60%	91	9.10%	1	0.10%	791	79.10%	1,000
Miller	200	78.13%	2	0.78%	6	2.34%	48	18.75%	194	75.78%	256
Milton	320	72.07%	17	3.83%	107	24.10%	0	0.00%	213	47.97%	444
Mitchell	917	82.91%	30	2.71%	140	12.66%	19	1.72%	777	70.25%	1,106
Monroe	786	88.51%	9	1.01%	93	10.47%	0	0.00%	693	78.04%	888
Montgomery	854	85.49%	52	5.21%	93	9.31%	0	0.00%	761	76.18%	999
Morgan	575	87.65%	24	3.66%	57	8.69%	0	0.00%	518	78.96%	656
Murray	366	47.47%	68	8.82%	307	39.82%	30	3.89%	59	7.65%	771
Muscogee	1,817	85.35%	51	2.40%	102	4.79%	159	7.47%	1,715	80.55%	2,129
Newton	840	89.27%	57	6.06%	43	4.57%	1	0.11%	783	83.21%	941
Oconee	208	53.47%	1	0.26%	180	46.27%	0	0.00%	28	7.20%	389
Oglethorpe	503	81.79%	33	5.37%	79	12.85%	0	0.00%	424	68.94%	615
Paulding	426	37.30%	32	2.80%	684	59.89%	0	0.00%	-258	-22.59%	1,142
Pickens	324	34.80%	190	20.41%	417	44.79%	0	0.00%	-93	-9.99%	931
Pierce	408	69.39%	83	14.12%	97	16.50%	0	0.00%	311	52.89%	588
Pike	751	81.63%	34	3.70%	134	14.57%	1	0.11%	617	67.07%	920
Polk	706	54.90%	36	2.80%	539	41.91%	5	0.39%	167	12.99%	1,286
Pulaski	1,080	95.07%	17	1.50%	39	3.43%	0	0.00%	1,041	91.64%	1,136
Putnam	460	96.64%	6	1.26%	10	2.10%	0	0.00%	450	94.54%	476
Quitman	112	87.50%	7	5.47%	9	7.03%	0	0.00%	103	80.47%	128
Rabun	327	71.24%	12	2.61%	119	25.93%	1	0.22%	208	45.32%	459
Randolph	559	84.70%	57	8.64%	44	6.67%	0	0.00%	502	76.06%	660
Richmond	1,871	77.44%	177	7.33%	234	9.69%	134	5.55%	1,637	67.76%	2,416
Rockdale	434	85.77%	11	2.17%	61	12.06%	0	0.00%	373	73.72%	506
Schley	212	89.83%	3	1.27%	20	8.47%	1	0.42%	192	81.36%	236
Screven	460	74.07%	21	3.38%	138	22.22%	2	0.32%	322	51.85%	621
Spalding	736	91.20%	26	3.22%	45	5.58%	0	0.00%	691	85.63%	807
Stephens	409	84.33%	15	3.09%	61	12.58%	0	0.00%	348	71.75%	485
Stewart	452	94.96%	17	3.57%	7	1.47%	0	0.00%	435	91.39%	476
Sumter	1,004	95.62%	24	2.29%	19	1.81%	3	0.29%	980	93.33%	1,050
Talbot	446	82.44%	8	1.48%	87	16.08%	0	0.00%	359	66.36%	541
Taliaferro	242	83.74%	7	2.42%	40	13.84%	0	0.00%	202	69.90%	289
Tattnall	592	69.89%	18	2.13%	234	27.63%	3	0.35%	358	42.27%	847
Taylor	342	74.84%	17	3.72%	98	21.44%	0	0.00%	244	53.39%	457
Telfair	695	94.69%	20	2.72%	19	2.59%	0	0.00%	675	91.96%	734
Terrell	608	92.68%	29	4.42%	19	2.90%	0	0.00%	579	88.26%	656
Thomas	1,012	81.48%	47	3.78%	176	14.17%	7	0.56%	836	67.31%	1,242
Tift	427	65.49%	0	0.00%	189	28.99%	36	5.52%	238	36.50%	652
Toombs	327	77.30%	20	4.73%	75	17.73%	1	0.24%	252	59.57%	423
Towns	230	43.48%	89	16.82%	206	38.94%	4	0.76%	24	4.54%	529
Troup	1,441	93.94%	16	1.04%	75	4.89%	2	0.13%	1,366	89.05%	1,534
Turner	385	74.18%	25	4.82%	75	14.45%	34	6.55%	310	59.73%	519
Twiggs	307	95.05%	3	0.93%	13	4.02%	0	0.00%	294	91.02%	323
Union	319	48.11%	88	13.27%	256	38.61%	0	0.00%	63	9.50%	663
Upson	445	75.42%	7	1.19%	138	23.39%	0	0.00%	307	52.03%	590
Walker	771	54.64%	215	15.24%	404	28.63%	21	1.49%	367	26.01%	1,411
Walton	885	73.81%	40	3.34%	274	22.85%	0	0.00%	611	50.96%	1,199
Ware	972	88.77%	54	4.93%	39	3.56%	30	2.74%	918	83.84%	1,095
Warren	262	76.83%	11	3.23%	67	19.65%	1	0.29%	195	57.18%	341
Washington	920	82.51%	28	2.51%	167	14.98%	0	0.00%	753	67.53%	1,115
Wayne	380	89.83%	14	3.31%	25	5.91%	4	0.95%	355	83.92%	423
Webster	139	97.89%	2	1.41%	1	0.70%	0	0.00%	137	96.48%	142
White	152	55.68%	11	4.03%	110	40.29%	0	0.00%	42	15.38%	273
Whitfield	761	55.55%	106	7.74%	437	31.90%	66	4.82%	324	23.65%	1,370
Wilcox	525	92.11%	15	2.63%	29	5.09%	1	0.18%	496	87.02%	570
Wilkes	657	89.39%	3	0.41%	68	9.25%	7	0.95%	589	80.14%	735
Wilkinson	335	92.54%	10	2.76%	17	4.70%	0	0.00%	318	87.85%	362
Worth	500	84.18%	12	2.02%	77	12.96%	5	0.84%	423	71.21%	594
Totals	93,087	76.63%	5,191	4.27%	21,985	18.10%	1,207	0.99%	71,102	58.53%	121,470

== See also ==
- United States presidential elections in Georgia
