= Milton County, Georgia =

Former county of Georgia, United States (1857–1931)

Milton County
- Former county
- Location of the county within Georgia, United States
- Country: United States
- State: Georgia
- Established: 1857
- Merged: 1932
- Seat: Alpharetta

Population (1900)
  - Total: 6,763

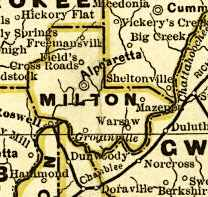
Original Milton County in 1883, with (counterclockwise from lower right) Gwinnett to the southeast, Forsyth to the northeast, Cherokee to the northwest, Cobb to the southwest, and Fulton (Hammond, now Sandy Springs) and DeKalb (Chamblee and Dunwoody) to the south. The northern edge of DeKalb also now no longer touches the river, as it did then.

Milton County was a county of the U.S. state of Georgia from 1857 (169 years ago) to 1931 (95 years ago). It was created on December 18, 1857, from parts of northeastern Cobb, southeastern Cherokee, and southwestern Forsyth counties. The county was named for John Milton, Secretary of State of Georgia from 1777 to 1799. Alpharetta was the county seat until the end of 1931, when Milton was merged with Fulton County to save it from bankruptcy during the Great Depression. At that time, Campbell County, which had already gone bankrupt, was also ceded to Fulton, giving it its 70-mile (110 km) long irregular shape along the Chattahoochee River.

Following the 1932 merger, the Cobb County town of Roswell was also ceded to Fulton four months later on May 9, 1932. The cession of Roswell (including everything east of Willeo Creek) made the new county more contiguous, though a very narrow strip (what is now the Dunwoody Panhandle of Sandy Springs, ceded to Milton from DeKalb) actually already connected the two sections.

In 1900, there were several other post offices besides Alpharetta: Arnold, Coker, Dinsmore, Field's Cross Roads, Freemansville, McClure, Mazeppa, Ocee, Skelton, Stono, and Warsaw. Milton totaled 147 square miles (380 km^{2}) or 94,080 acres. There was a population of 6,763, which was 555 more than at the previous (1890) census. Alpharetta had 310 residents; 1,529 lived in and around it. Methodists and Baptists were the dominant religious denominations.

Historical population
Census	Pop.	Note	%±
1860	4,602		—
1870	4,284		−6.9%
1880	6,261		46.1%
1890	6,208		−0.8%
1900	6,763		8.9%
1910	7,239		7.0%
1920	6,885		−4.9%
1930	6,730		−2.3%
U.S. Decennial Census

== Re-creation proposals ==
See Secession section of Fulton County, Georgia for more in depth information

Fulton County has 10 percent of the state's population, being more populous than eight U.S. states and the District of Columbia. The Fulton County school district is the only non-contiguous school district in the state, having a 17-mile (27 km) separation (Atlanta Public Schools) between the north and south.

In recent years, some residents of north Fulton County have sought to re-create Milton County. The proposed plan would include some of Georgia's largest cities in a new Milton County, such as Roswell (7th), Sandy Springs (8th), Johns Creek (12th), Alpharetta (13th), Milton (54th), as well as Mountain Park.

A February 2009 study completed in collaboration between the University of Georgia's Carl Vinson Institute of Government and Georgia State University's Andrew Young School of Policy Studies gave a positive analysis of the financial viability of the proposed Milton County.

A bill before the Georgia General Assembly in 2005 that proposed the inclusion of Sandy Springs would rename the remainder of Fulton County as "Atlanta County". The state's constitution, however, now prohibits any more than 159 counties, the number it has had since the merger in 1932. Any change would require a constitutional amendment, supported by two-thirds of each house in the General Assembly and by over half of all voters statewide in a referendum.

On January 9, 2007, state Representative Jan Jones, who represents the house district that includes Roswell, and representatives of adjacent districts introduced HR 12. Without mentioning Milton County by name, HR 12 proposed to amend the state constitution to allow the legislature to re-create previous counties regardless of the 159-county limit, if such an action is ratified by voters in the areas of the proposed re-created county. The amendment would disallow voters in the remaining parts of Fulton County from voting on the issue. Jones stated in November 2008 that she would reintroduce the bill in 2009, after the University of Georgia's study of the issue was completed.

A resolution to amend the Georgia Constitution to ease the political path for resurrection of the county was reintroduced by the area's legislators in the 2009 session as HR 21 and SR 392. As of 2009 February 18, HR 21 was reported favorably out of committee in a 7–1 vote. Reps. Jan Jones and Mark Burkhalter spoke in favor as well as Fulton County Commissioner Lynne Riley. Lobbyists for Fulton County and City of Atlanta, and Atlanta Dept of Watershed Management Commissioner Robert Hunter spoke against.

As of 2010, Jan Jones (who lives in the new city of Milton, named for the former county) was the speaker pro tempore of the Georgia House, and was expected to make a strong push for the new county. The constitutional amendment would require two-thirds of each house and half of all voters in a statewide referendum to approve the re-creation of former counties (Milton and Campbell). As of October 2021 no proposals have been advanced.

== Geography ==
Milton County originally bordered Gwinnett to the southeast, Forsyth to the northeast, Cherokee to the northwest, Cobb to the southwest, and DeKalb (Chamblee and Dunwoody) to the south. Because the Roswell area was formerly located in Cobb County, there was no border between Fulton and Milton counties before 1932. The northern edge of DeKalb also now no longer touches the river, as it did then. This section, north of Dunwoody Club Drive, is now the panhandle of Sandy Springs.

United States presidential election results for Milton County, Georgia
Year	Republican		Democratic		Third party(ies)	
Year	No.	%	No.	%	No.	%
1880	46	9.09%	460	90.91%	0	0.00%
1884	57	10.29%	497	89.71%	0	0.00%
1888	56	5.85%	895	93.42%	7	0.73%
1892	73	7.82%	619	66.35%	241	25.83%
1896	227	33.14%	428	62.48%	30	4.38%
1900	116	23.82%	308	63.24%	63	12.94%
1904	25	5.59%	263	58.84%	159	35.57%
1908	120	33.90%	182	51.41%	52	14.69%
1912	17	3.83%	320	72.07%	107	24.10%
1916	18	3.18%	387	68.37%	161	28.45%
1920	231	45.38%	278	54.62%	0	0.00%
1924	53	16.16%	224	68.29%	51	15.55%
1928	444	70.81%	183	29.19%	0	0.00%
