= 1904 United States presidential election in Georgia =

- November 8, 1904
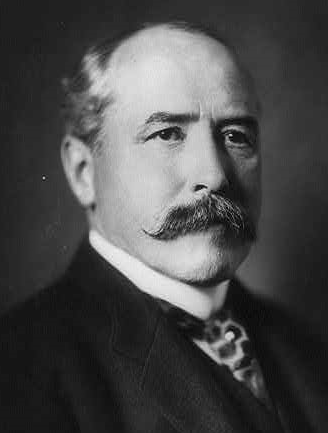

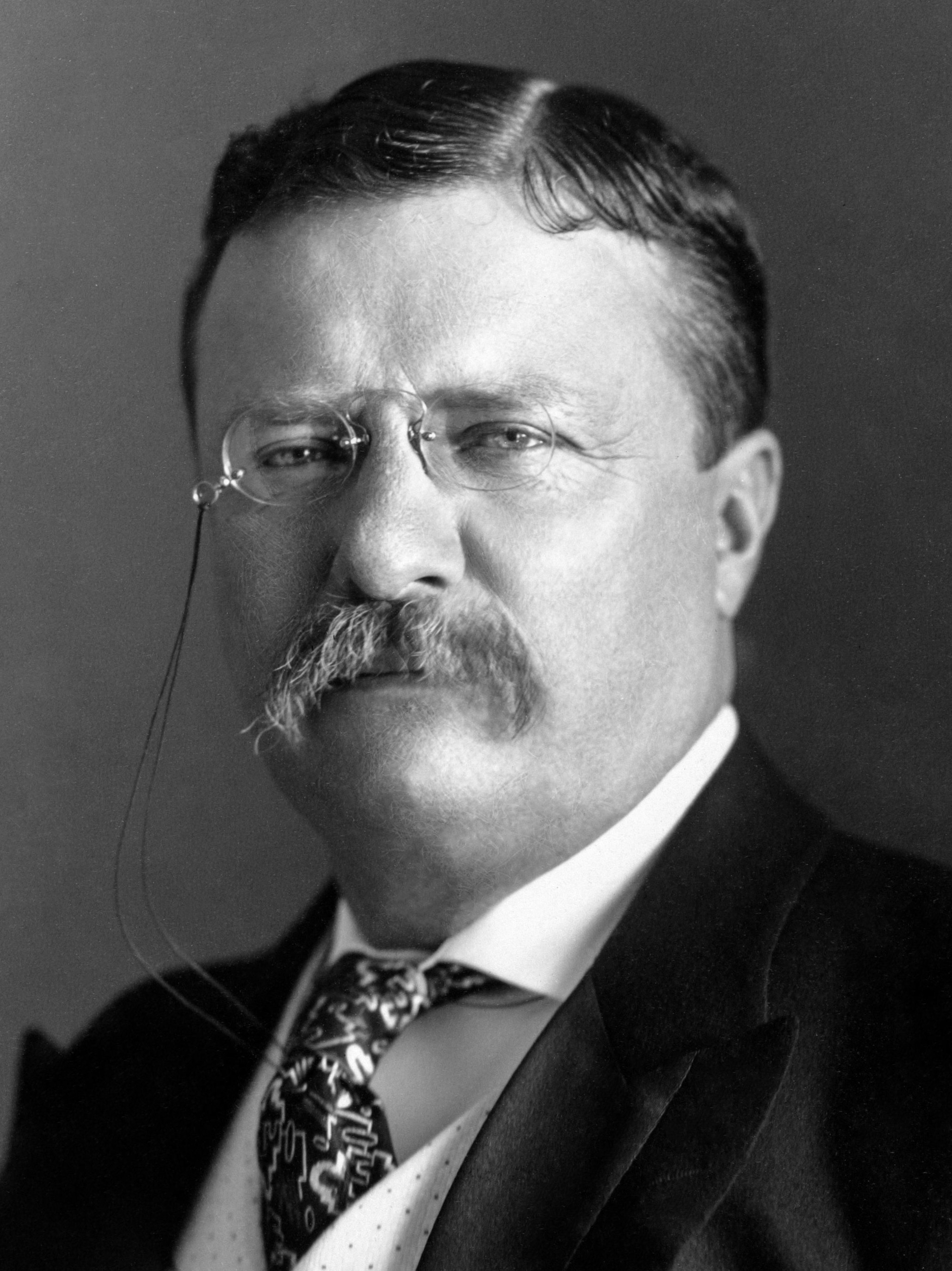

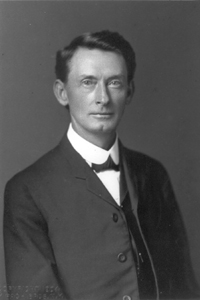
Nominee	Alton Parker	Theodore Roosevelt	Thomas E. Watson
Party	Democratic	Republican	Populist
Home state	New York	New York	Georgia
Running mate	Henry G. Davis	Charles W. Fairbanks	Thomas Tibbles
Electoral vote	13	0	0
Popular vote	83,466	24,004	22,635
Percentage	63.72%	18.33%	17.28%
County results
Parker
40–50%
50–60%
60–70%
70–80%
80–90%
90–100%
Roosevelt
30–40%
40–50%
50–60%
60–70%
Watson
30–40%
40–50%
50–60%
60–70%
President before election
Theodore Roosevelt
Republican
Elected President
Theodore Roosevelt
Republican

The 1904 United States presidential election in Georgia took place on November 8, 1904, as part of the wider United States presidential election. Voters chose 13 representatives, or electors, to the Electoral College, who voted for president and vice president.

Following Reconstruction, Georgia would be the first former Confederate state to substantially disenfranchise its newly enfranchised freedmen, doing so in the early 1870s. This largely limited the Republican Party to a few North Georgia counties with substantial Civil War Unionist sentiment – chiefly Fannin but also to a lesser extent Pickens, Gilmer and Towns. The Democratic Party served as the guardian of white supremacy against a Republican Party historically associated with memories of Reconstruction, and the main competition became Democratic primaries, which state laws restricted to whites on the grounds of the Democratic Party being legally a private club.

However, politics after the first demobilization by a cumulative poll tax was chaotic. Third-party movements, chiefly the Populist Party, gained support amongst poor whites and the remaining black voters in opposition to the planter elite. The fact that Georgia had already substantially reduced its poor white and black electorate two decades ago, alongside pressure from urban elites in Atlanta, and the decline of isolationism due to the success of the Spanish–American War, meant the Populist movement substantially faded in the late 1890s. However, Populism would revive in 1904 when it became clear a conservative would be nominated by the Democratic Party, whilst Watson did not find it difficult to get a somewhat demoralized party's nomination over William V. Allen.

Georgia was won by the Democratic nominees, former Chief Judge of New York Court of Appeals Alton B. Parker and his running mate, former US Senator Henry G. Davis of West Virginia. They defeated the Republican nominees, incumbent President Theodore Roosevelt of New York and his running mate Charles W. Fairbanks of Indiana. Parker won the state by a landslide margin of 45.39%.

Populist candidate and Georgia native Thomas E. Watson would campaign in the state in August, but as Georgia had not voted Republican even during Reconstruction neither major party candidate visited the state. Watson would collapse from his campaigning at the end of September, No polls were taken until October 29, by which time the state was naturally viewed as certain for Parker. Parker would eventually win Georgia with over five-eighths of the vote, although he declined by about three percent from William Jennings Bryan's performance four years previously. Incumbent Republican President Theodore Roosevelt and Watson ran a very close race for second, with the President edging the Populist for this position. Watson's 17.28% of the vote in Georgia was the largest percentage the Populists won in a state during the 1904 presidential election.

== Results ==
1904 United States presidential election in Georgia
Party	Candidate	Votes	Percentage	Electoral votes
Democratic	Alton B. Parker	83,466	63.72%	13
Republican	Theodore Roosevelt (incumbent)	24,004	18.33%	0
People's	Thomas E. Watson	22,635	17.28%	0
Prohibition	Silas C. Swallow	685	0.52%	0
Socialist	Eugene V. Debs	196	0.15%	0

=== Results by county ===
County	Alton Brooks Parker Democratic		Theodore Roosevelt Republican		Thomas Edward Watson Populist		Various candidates Other parties		Margin		Total votes cast
County	#	%	#	%	#	%	#	%	#	%	Total votes cast
Appling	554	62.04%	237	26.54%	96	10.75%	6	0.67%	317	35.50%	893
Baker	511	94.45%	8	1.48%	22	4.07%	0	0.00%	489 (Note: In this county where Roosevelt ran behind both Parker and Watson, margin given is Parker vote minsu Watson vote and percentage margin Parker percentage minus Watson percentage.)	90.39%	541
Baldwin	494	81.65%	15	2.48%	92	15.21%	4	0.66%	402	66.45%	605
Banks	474	44.30%	199	18.60%	388	36.26%	9	0.84%	86	8.04%	1,070
Bartow	791	59.25%	406	30.41%	126	9.44%	12	0.90%	385	28.84%	1,335
Berrien	889	81.34%	68	6.22%	122	11.16%	14	1.28%	767	70.17%	1,093
Bibb	2,117	88.47%	236	9.86%	21	0.88%	19	0.79%	1,881	78.60%	2,393
Brooks	429	69.98%	102	16.64%	81	13.21%	1	0.16%	327	53.34%	613
Bryan	259	56.80%	125	27.41%	71	15.57%	1	0.22%	134	29.39%	456
Bulloch	596	71.55%	54	6.48%	171	20.53%	12	1.44%	425	51.02%	833
Burke	657	87.02%	52	6.89%	42	5.56%	4	0.53%	605	80.13%	755
Butts	531	72.64%	80	10.94%	116	15.87%	4	0.55%	415	56.77%	731
Calhoun	345	87.56%	19	4.82%	30	7.61%	0	0.00%	315	79.95%	394
Camden	380	54.76%	312	44.96%	2	0.29%	0	0.00%	68	9.80%	694
Campbell	308	54.32%	40	7.05%	210	37.04%	9	1.59%	98	17.28%	567
Carroll	1,187	54.13%	400	18.24%	585	26.68%	21	0.96%	602	27.45%	2,193
Catoosa	281	61.22%	120	26.14%	44	9.59%	14	3.05%	161	35.08%	459
Charlton	207	86.97%	31	13.03%	0	0.00%	0	0.00%	176	73.95%	238
Chatham	2,645	87.52%	363	12.01%	6	0.20%	8	0.26%	2,282	75.51%	3,022
Chattahoochee	107	54.87%	62	31.79%	24	12.31%	2	1.03%	45	23.08%	195
Chattooga	472	49.74%	378	39.83%	80	8.43%	19	2.00%	94	9.91%	949
Cherokee	622	50.78%	246	20.08%	342	27.92%	15	1.22%	280	22.86%	1,225
Clarke	773	76.61%	118	11.69%	114	11.30%	4	0.40%	655	64.92%	1,009
Clay	270	62.36%	47	10.85%	116	26.79%	0	0.00%	154	35.57%	433
Clayton	333	59.25%	59	10.50%	169	30.07%	1	0.18%	164	29.18%	562
Clinch	285	63.19%	141	31.26%	23	5.10%	2	0.44%	144	31.93%	451
Cobb	1,171	68.40%	220	12.85%	316	18.46%	5	0.29%	855	49.94%	1,712
Coffee	571	63.16%	267	29.54%	64	7.08%	2	0.22%	304	33.63%	904
Colquitt	446	59.23%	62	8.23%	236	31.34%	9	1.20%	210	27.89%	753
Columbia	189	56.76%	2	0.60%	138	41.44%	4	1.20%	51	15.32%	333
Coweta	1,070	83.27%	160	12.45%	49	3.81%	6	0.47%	910	70.82%	1,285
Crawford	314	85.09%	4	1.08%	48	13.01%	3	0.81%	266	72.09%	369
Dade	217	73.06%	37	12.46%	40	13.47%	3	1.01%	177	59.60%	297
Dawson	207	37.98%	260	47.71%	67	12.29%	11	2.02%	-53	-9.72%	545
De Kalb	759	57.28%	213	16.08%	343	25.89%	10	0.75%	416	31.40%	1,325
Decatur	985	75.42%	182	13.94%	130	9.95%	9	0.69%	803	61.49%	1,306
Dodge	688	85.79%	98	12.22%	16	2.00%	0	0.00%	590	73.57%	802
Dooly	986	81.22%	107	8.81%	118	9.72%	3	0.25%	868	71.50%	1,214
Dougherty	475	91.35%	45	8.65%	0	0.00%	0	0.00%	430	82.69%	520
Douglas	230	35.71%	133	20.65%	278	43.17%	3	0.47%	-48	-7.45%	644
Early	466	66.95%	12	1.72%	214	30.75%	4	0.57%	252	36.21%	696
Echols	159	92.98%	12	7.02%	0	0.00%	0	0.00%	147	85.96%	171
Effingham	370	74.00%	47	9.40%	54	10.80%	29	5.80%	316	63.20%	500
Elbert	877	83.13%	6	0.57%	167	15.83%	5	0.47%	710	67.30%	1,055
Emanuel	519	51.74%	94	9.37%	388	38.68%	2	0.20%	131	13.06%	1,003
Fannin	456	44.71%	504	49.41%	48	4.71%	12	1.18%	-48	-4.71%	1,020
Fayette	260	54.97%	59	12.47%	147	31.08%	7	1.48%	113	23.89%	473
Floyd	1,692	71.15%	466	19.60%	192	8.07%	28	1.18%	1,226	51.56%	2,378
Forsyth	455	42.72%	357	33.52%	248	23.29%	5	0.47%	98	9.20%	1,065
Franklin	486	42.11%	207	17.94%	453	39.25%	8	0.69%	33	2.86%	1,154
Fulton	5,781	73.66%	1,766	22.50%	240	3.06%	61	0.78%	4,015	51.16%	7,848
Gilmer	550	47.01%	617	52.74%	0	0.00%	3	0.26%	-67	-5.73%	1,170
Glascock	117	27.79%	11	2.61%	290	68.88%	3	0.71%	-173	-41.09%	421
Glynn	501	58.67%	316	37.00%	32	3.75%	5	0.59%	185	21.66%	854
Gordon	525	50.10%	323	30.82%	192	18.32%	8	0.76%	202	19.27%	1,048
Greene	451	49.56%	201	22.09%	252	27.69%	6	0.66%	199	21.87%	910
Gwinnett	1,219	55.23%	132	5.98%	845	38.29%	11	0.50%	374	16.95%	2,207
Habersham	681	59.06%	229	19.86%	225	19.51%	18	1.56%	452	39.20%	1,153
Hall	1,135	57.41%	190	9.61%	635	32.12%	17	0.86%	500	25.29%	1,977
Hancock	482	75.08%	31	4.83%	124	19.31%	5	0.78%	358	55.76%	642
Haralson	349	29.65%	477	40.53%	336	28.55%	15	1.27%	-128	-10.88%	1,177
Harris	689	79.75%	80	9.26%	91	10.53%	4	0.46%	598	69.21%	864
Hart	482	59.21%	93	11.43%	233	28.62%	6	0.74%	249	30.59%	814
Heard	361	77.80%	9	1.94%	84	18.10%	10	2.16%	277	59.70%	464
Henry	464	59.41%	64	8.19%	239	30.60%	14	1.79%	225	28.81%	781
Houston	768	88.48%	78	8.99%	19	2.19%	3	0.35%	690	79.49%	868
Irwin	658	59.87%	342	31.12%	82	7.46%	17	1.55%	316	28.75%	1,099
Jackson	964	43.11%	33	1.48%	1,233	55.14%	6	0.27%	-269	-12.03%	2,236
Jasper	613	85.02%	50	6.93%	58	8.04%	0	0.00%	555	76.98%	721
Jefferson	379	37.94%	489	48.95%	121	12.11%	10	1.00%	-110	-11.01%	999
Johnson	257	38.13%	59	8.75%	355	52.67%	3	0.45%	-98	-14.54%	674
Jones	498	79.68%	89	14.24%	36	5.76%	2	0.32%	409	65.44%	625
Laurens	878	56.87%	390	25.26%	272	17.62%	4	0.26%	488	31.61%	1,544
Lee	285	61.82%	63	13.67%	113	24.51%	0	0.00%	172	37.31%	461
Liberty	242	38.54%	245	39.01%	141	22.45%	0	0.00%	-3	-0.48%	628
Lincoln	195	54.47%	0	0.00%	163	45.53%	0	0.00%	32	8.94%	358
Lowndes	888	72.91%	289	23.73%	34	2.79%	7	0.57%	599	49.18%	1,218
Lumpkin	525	63.18%	253	30.45%	53	6.38%	0	0.00%	272	32.73%	831
Macon	465	63.87%	180	24.73%	82	11.26%	1	0.14%	285	39.15%	728
Madison	733	77.90%	49	5.21%	154	16.37%	5	0.53%	579	61.53%	941
Marion	247	54.53%	51	11.26%	154	34.00%	1	0.22%	93	20.53%	453
McDuffie	196	40.50%	4	0.83%	283	58.47%	1	0.21%	-87	-17.98%	484
McIntosh	144	42.86%	190	56.55%	2	0.60%	0	0.00%	-46	-13.69%	336
Meriwether	765	68.30%	98	8.75%	253	22.59%	4	0.36%	512	45.71%	1,120
Miller	174	59.39%	1	0.34%	118	40.27%	0	0.00%	56	19.11%	293
Milton	263	58.84%	25	5.59%	158	35.35%	1	0.22%	105	23.49%	447
Mitchell	511	63.01%	145	17.88%	155	19.11%	0	0.00%	356	43.90%	811
Monroe	462	69.47%	36	5.41%	163	24.51%	4	0.60%	299	44.96%	665
Montgomery	593	69.03%	121	14.09%	141	16.41%	4	0.47%	452	52.62%	859
Morgan	512	79.50%	67	10.40%	44	6.83%	21	3.26%	445	69.10%	644
Murray	270	43.90%	252	40.98%	86	13.98%	7	1.14%	18	2.93%	615
Muscogee	1,522	88.28%	164	9.51%	6	0.35%	32	1.86%	1,358	78.77%	1,724
Newton	928	68.14%	354	25.99%	73	5.36%	7	0.51%	574	42.14%	1,362
Oconee	198	36.07%	99	18.03%	245	44.63%	7	1.28%	-47	-8.56%	549
Oglethorpe	719	86.11%	5	0.60%	101	12.10%	10	1.20%	618	74.01%	835
Paulding	402	32.90%	341	27.91%	479	39.20%	0	0.00%	-77	-6.30%	1,222
Pickens	347	27.80%	810	64.90%	87	6.97%	4	0.32%	-463	-37.10%	1,248
Pierce	354	69.82%	73	14.40%	77	15.19%	3	0.59%	277	54.64%	507
Pike	662	68.32%	92	9.49%	214	22.08%	1	0.10%	448	46.23%	969
Polk	653	43.07%	689	45.45%	174	11.48%	0	0.00%	-36	-2.37%	1,516
Pulaski	605	87.94%	29	4.22%	54	7.85%	0	0.00%	551	80.09%	688
Putnam	573	96.63%	3	0.51%	16	2.70%	1	0.17%	557	93.93%	593
Quitman	119	69.59%	35	20.47%	17	9.94%	0	0.00%	84	49.12%	171
Rabun	364	74.44%	121	24.74%	4	0.82%	0	0.00%	243	49.69%	489
Randolph	551	78.05%	87	12.32%	68	9.63%	0	0.00%	464	65.72%	706
Richmond	1,816	65.82%	174	6.31%	754	27.33%	15	0.54%	1,062	38.49%	2,759
Rockdale	434	62.63%	133	19.19%	124	17.89%	2	0.29%	301	43.43%	693
Schley	243	66.94%	55	15.15%	64	17.63%	1	0.28%	179	49.31%	363
Screven	430	64.47%	25	3.75%	210	31.48%	2	0.30%	220	32.98%	667
Spalding	905	84.90%	142	13.32%	13	1.22%	6	0.56%	763	71.58%	1,066
Stewart	429	67.67%	155	24.45%	50	7.89%	0	0.00%	274	43.22%	634
Sumter	918	82.04%	159	14.21%	41	3.66%	1	0.09%	759	67.83%	1,119
Talbot	484	82.74%	74	12.65%	26	4.44%	1	0.17%	410	70.09%	585
Taliaferro	377	54.48%	184	26.59%	130	18.79%	1	0.14%	193	27.89%	692
Tattnall	621	54.05%	171	14.88%	350	30.46%	7	0.61%	271	23.59%	1,149
Taylor	309	56.80%	63	11.58%	170	31.25%	2	0.37%	139	25.55%	544
Telfair	781	92.54%	44	5.21%	14	1.66%	5	0.59%	737	87.32%	844
Terrell	630	81.29%	77	9.94%	67	8.65%	1	0.13%	553	71.35%	775
Thomas	862	53.81%	374	23.35%	357	22.28%	9	0.56%	488	30.46%	1,602
Towns	338	36.34%	417	44.84%	174	18.71%	1	0.11%	-79	-8.49%	930
Troup	891	78.23%	20	1.76%	220	19.32%	8	0.70%	671	58.91%	1,139
Twiggs	378	88.52%	30	7.03%	19	4.45%	0	0.00%	348	81.50%	427
Union	419	41.69%	466	46.37%	114	11.34%	6	0.60%	-47	-4.68%	1,005
Upson	468	56.66%	77	9.32%	280	33.90%	1	0.12%	188	22.76%	826
Walker	858	59.42%	512	35.46%	71	4.92%	3	0.21%	346	23.96%	1,444
Walton	877	58.43%	245	16.32%	373	24.85%	6	0.40%	504	33.58%	1,501
Ware	635	78.20%	158	19.46%	4	0.49%	15	1.85%	477	58.74%	812
Warren	220	42.15%	75	14.37%	221	42.34%	6	1.15%	-1	-0.19%	522
Washington	976	57.41%	195	11.47%	529	31.12%	0	0.00%	447	26.29%	1,700
Wayne	417	73.81%	89	15.75%	54	9.56%	5	0.88%	328	58.05%	565
Webster	165	65.22%	53	20.95%	35	13.83%	0	0.00%	112	44.27%	253
White	297	42.80%	179	25.79%	218	31.41%	0	0.00%	79	11.38%	694
Whitfield	569	44.63%	427	33.49%	217	17.02%	62	4.86%	142	11.14%	1,275
Wilcox	501	67.98%	194	26.32%	39	5.29%	3	0.41%	307	41.66%	737
Wilkes	622	74.94%	6	0.72%	198	23.86%	4	0.48%	424	51.08%	830
Wilkinson	539	80.69%	37	5.54%	90	13.47%	2	0.30%	449	67.22%	668
Worth	529	50.53%	272	25.98%	241	23.02%	5	0.48%	257	24.55%	1,047
Totals	83,772	64.11%	23,794	18.21%	22,220	17.01%	881	0.67%	59,978	45.90%	130,667

== See also ==
- United States presidential elections in Georgia
