= Clarke County, Georgia =

County in Georgia, United States

- County
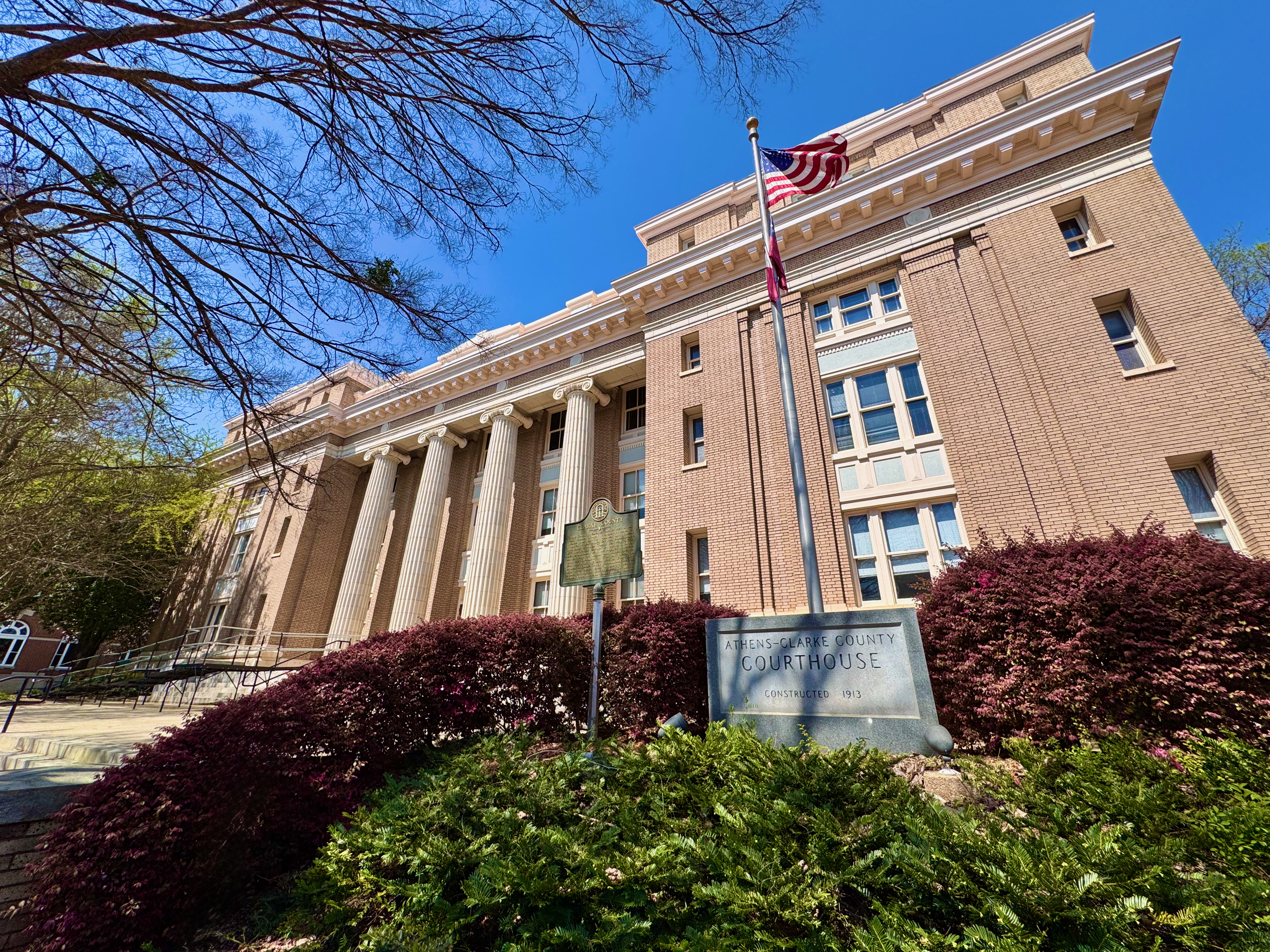
- Clarke County Courthouse in Athens

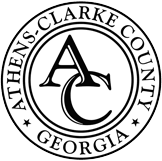
- Seal

- Location within the U.S. state of Georgia
- Coordinates: 33°57′20″N 83°23′00″W
- Country: United States
- State: Georgia
- Founded: 1801; 225 years ago
- Named for: Elijah Clarke
- Seat: Athens
- Largest city: Athens

Area
  - Total: 121 sq mi (310 km^{2})
  - Land: 119 sq mi (310 km^{2})
  - Water: 1.8 sq mi (4.7 km^{2}) 1.5%

Population (2020)
  - Total: 128,671
  - Estimate (2025): 129,921 ▲
  - Density: 1,080/sq mi (417/km^{2})
- Time zone: UTC−5 (Eastern)
  - Summer (DST): UTC−4 (EDT)
- Congressional districts: 9th, 10th
- Website: accgov.com

Clarke County is located in the East Central region of the U.S. state of Georgia. As of the 2020 census, its population was 128,671. Its county seat is Athens, with which it is a consolidated city-county. Clarke County is included in the Athens-Clarke County, GA metropolitan statistical area, which is also included in the Atlanta-Athens-Clarke County-Sandy Springs, GA combined statistical area.

== History ==
Clarke County was created in 1801 by an act of the Georgia General Assembly on December 5. It was named for Revolutionary War hero Elijah Clarke and included 250 square miles (647.5 km^{2}) that were formerly part of Jackson County. Colonel Clarke played a leading role the 1779 victory at the Battle of Kettle Creek in Wilkes County. The Elijah Clarke Chapter of the Daughters of the American Revolution erected a monument to him in Broad Street in Athens.

As the population of the county grew in the early 19th century, its agricultural and cotton industries prospered. The adjacent plantation harvests flowed through city mills. Manufacturing and textile production operations were the major industries in Clarke County, especially after the railroad reached Athens in 1841. Athens and Clarke County were second only to Savannah and Chatham County in the amount of capital invested in manufacturing in the 1840s.

Two skirmishes were fought in Clarke County in 1864, during the American Civil War, one near Barber's Creek and the other near Mitchell's Road. Athens was occupied by the Union Army on May 29 and a provost-marshal took charge. Formal military occupation of the county ended by December 1864, though Union troops remained in the county until early 1866.

In 1801, the Clarke County Commission had selected Watkinsville (now in Oconee County) as the county seat. All county offices, including the courts and jail, moved to Athens when the seat was moved on November 24, 1871. County meetings took place in the old Athens town hall, until a new courthouse was constructed in 1876. The present courthouse was built in 1914.

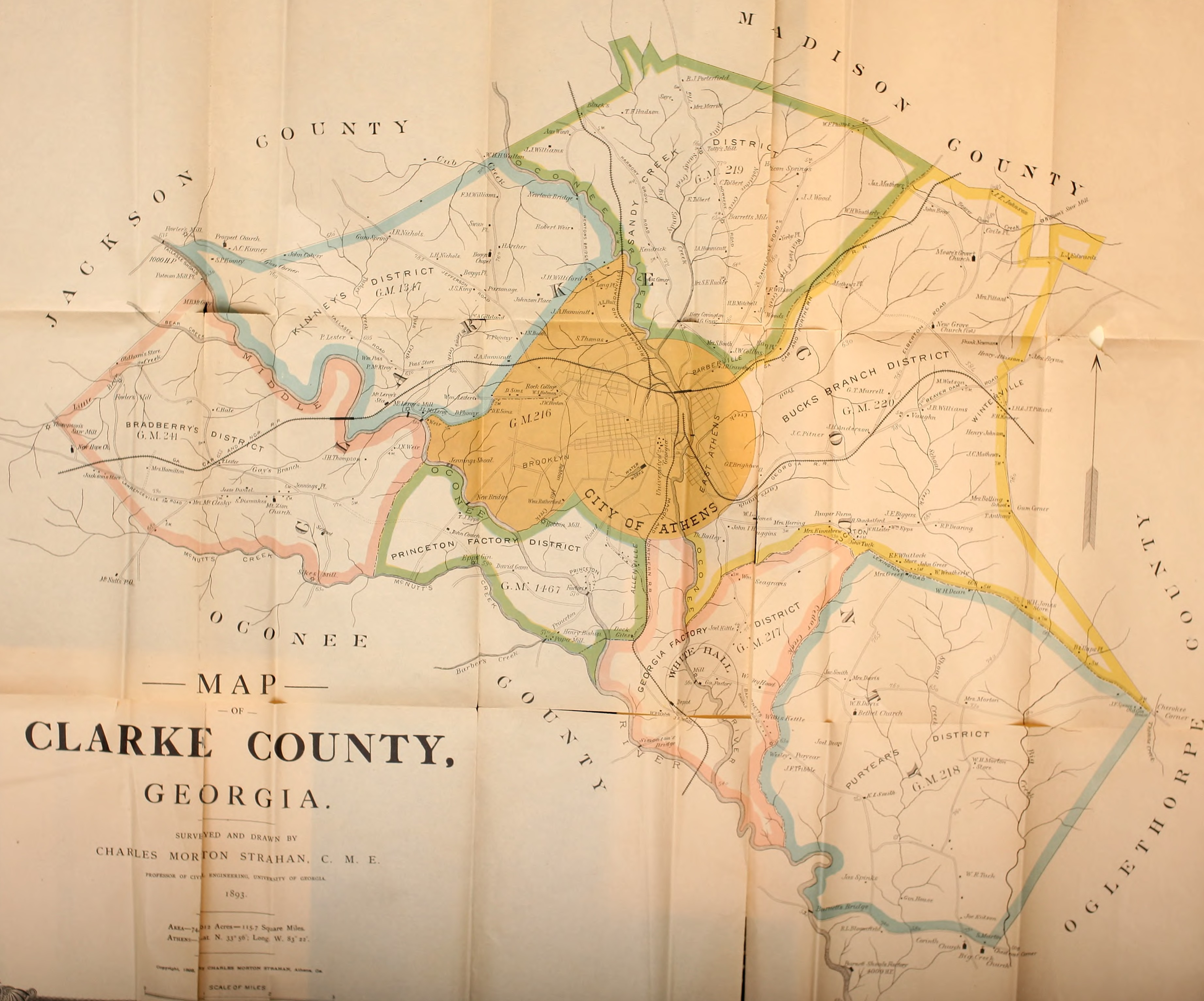
Map of Clarke County from 1893

On February 12, 1875, in response to complaints over the relocation of the county seat to Athens, the state legislature created Oconee County from the southwestern portion of Clarke County, making Watkinsville its seat. Clarke County thus lost one-third of its population and three-fifths of its land area.

The position of "commissioner of roads and revenue" was created by the legislature for what are today known as county commissioners. As an extension of the state, the county was to conduct welfare and health programs, build and maintain roads, and hold courts of law.

On March 29, 1973, the Georgia Legislature increased the number of county commissioners from three to five, also adding a county administrator.

In 1990, the residents voted to unify the city and county governments, creating Athens-Clarke County, the second (after Columbus-Muscogee County) unified city-county government in Georgia.

== Geography ==
Clarke County is located at 33°57′20″N 83°23′00″W. The county is located in the Piedmont region of the state.

The vast majority of Clarke County is located in the Upper Oconee River sub-basin of the Altamaha River basin, with a very small portion of the county's eastern edge, north of Winterville, located in the Broad River sub-basin of the Savannah River basin.

According to the U.S. Census Bureau, the county has a total area of 121 square miles (310 km^{2}), of which 1.8 square miles (4.7 km^{2}) (1.5%) are covered by water. It is the smallest county by area in Georgia.

=== Adjacent counties ===
- Madison County, Georgia - northeast
- Oglethorpe County, Georgia - east
- Oconee County, Georgia - southwest
- Barrow County, Georgia - west
- Jackson County, Georgia - northwest

== Communities ==
=== Cities ===
- Athens (county seat)
- Winterville

=== Town ===
- Bogart (mostly in Oconee County)

== Demographics ==
Historical population
Census	Pop.	Note	%±
1810	7,628		—
1820	8,767		14.9%
1830	10,176		16.1%
1840	10,522		3.4%
1850	11,119		5.7%
1860	11,218		0.9%
1870	12,941		15.4%
1880	11,702		−9.6%
1890	15,186		29.8%
1900	17,708		16.6%
1910	23,273		31.4%
1920	26,111		12.2%
1930	25,613		−1.9%
1940	28,398		10.9%
1950	36,550		28.7%
1960	45,363		24.1%
1970	65,177		43.7%
1980	74,498		14.3%
1990	87,594		17.6%
2000	101,489		15.9%
2010	116,714		15.0%
2020	128,671		10.2%
2025 (est.)	129,921	▲	1.0%
U.S. Decennial Census; 1790-1880 1890-1910; 1920-1930 1930-1940; 1940-1950 1960-1980; 1980-2000 2010 2020

=== Racial and ethnic composition ===
Clarke County, Georgia – Racial and ethnic composition Note: the US Census treats Hispanic/Latino as an ethnic category. This table excludes Latinos from the racial categories and assigns them to a separate category. Hispanics/Latinos may be of any race.
Race / Ethnicity (NH = Non-Hispanic)	Pop 1980	Pop 1990	Pop 2000	Pop 2010	Pop 2020	% 1980	% 1990	% 2000	% 2010	% 2020
White alone (NH)	55,138	60,980	62,895	66,674	72,201	74.01%	69.62%	61.97%	57.13%	56.11%
Black or African American alone (NH)	17,356	22,850	27,496	30,695	31,367	23.30%	26.09%	27.09%	26.30%	24.38%
Native American or Alaska Native alone (NH)	69	118	164	141	297	0.09%	0.13%	0.16%	0.12%	0.23%
Asian alone (NH)	720	2,107	3,162	4,811	4,920	0.97%	2.41%	3.12%	4.12%	3.82%
Native Hawaiian or Pacific Islander alone (NH)	x	x	41	48	66	x	x	0.04%	0.04%	0.05%
Other race alone (NH)	260	48	172	270	980	0.35%	0.05%	0.17%	0.23%	0.76%
Mixed race or Multiracial (NH)	x	x	1,123	1,883	4,504	x	x	1.11%	1.61%	3.50%
Hispanic or Latino (any race)	955	1,491	6,436	12,192	14,336	1.28%	1.70%	6.34%	10.45%	11.14%
Total	74,498	87,594	101,489	116,714	128,671	100.00%	100.00%	100.00%	100.00%	100.00%

=== 2020 census ===
As of the 2020 census, the county had a population of 128,671, 51,641 households, and 24,041 families. Of the residents, 17.0% were under 18 and 12.0% were 65 or older; the median age was 28.3 years. For every 100 females, there were 89.0 males, and for every 100 females 18 and over, there were 86.7 males; 94.1% of residents lived in urban areas and 5.9% lived in rural areas.

The racial makeup of the county was 58.2% White, 24.6% Black or African American, 0.5% American Indian and Alaska Native, 3.9% Asian, 0.1% Native Hawaiian and Pacific Islander, 6.1% from some other race, and 6.7% from two or more races. Hispanic or Latino residents of any race comprised 11.1% of the population.

Of the 51,641 households in the county, 23.0% had children under 18 living with them and 37.2% had a female householder with no spouse or partner present. About 32.8% of all households were made up of individuals, and 8.5% had someone living alone who was 65 or older.

The county had 55,802 housing units, of which 7.5% were vacant. Among occupied housing units, 39.3% were owner-occupied and 60.7% were renter-occupied. The homeowner vacancy rate was 1.7% and the rental vacancy rate was 5.4%.

== Crime ==
In 2022, Clarke County had the third-highest crime rate in Georgia. Clarke County had 35.5 crimes per 1,000 people, based on 4,599 offenses in 2022, and a population of 129,377. Like most other counties, the two more common crimes were larceny theft (2,983 incidents recorded in Clarke in 2022) and aggravated assault (1,979 incidents). Clarke County was only behind DeKalb County and Bibb County for highest crime rate.

== Politics ==
Due to the presence of the University of Georgia campus in Athens, Clarke County has long been a Democratic Party stronghold in presidential elections. This antedates the recent trend of Democratic gains in counties dominated by large universities. It has only backed the Republican candidate in three presidential elections, the fiercely divided realigning election of 1968 (in which it was one of only eight Georgia counties where George Wallace came in third) and the 49-state landslides of 1972 and 1984.

As of the 2020s, Clarke County is a strongly Democratic Party voting county, voting 68% for Kamala Harris in 2024. For elections to the United States House of Representatives, Clarke County is part of Georgia's 10th congressional district, currently represented by Mike Collins. For elections to the Georgia State Senate, Clarke County is divided between districts 46 and 47. For elections to the Georgia House of Representatives, Clarke County is part of districts 120, 121, 122 and 124.

United States presidential election results for Clarke County, Georgia
Year	Republican		Democratic		Third party(ies)	
Year	No.	%	No.	%	No.	%
1880	765	48.88%	800	51.12%	0	0.00%
1884	765	49.58%	778	50.42%	0	0.00%
1888	660	44.99%	801	54.60%	6	0.41%
1892	545	35.97%	835	55.12%	135	8.91%
1896	419	35.66%	707	60.17%	49	4.17%
1900	199	21.89%	672	73.93%	38	4.18%
1904	118	11.69%	773	76.61%	118	11.69%
1908	207	20.20%	720	70.24%	98	9.56%
1912	81	7.34%	956	86.67%	66	5.98%
1916	31	2.63%	1,036	87.80%	113	9.58%
1920	217	13.26%	1,419	86.74%	0	0.00%
1924	267	14.35%	1,530	82.26%	63	3.39%
1928	724	33.97%	1,407	66.03%	0	0.00%
1932	159	7.35%	1,992	92.05%	13	0.60%
1936	160	5.72%	2,632	94.13%	4	0.14%
1940	246	7.81%	2,894	91.87%	10	0.32%
1944	274	8.09%	3,112	91.91%	0	0.00%
1948	707	16.38%	3,095	71.69%	515	11.93%
1952	1,588	24.46%	4,904	75.54%	0	0.00%
1956	2,107	33.11%	4,257	66.89%	0	0.00%
1960	2,250	31.86%	4,812	68.14%	0	0.00%
1964	4,875	39.33%	7,519	60.67%	0	0.00%
1968	5,800	39.17%	5,556	37.52%	3,452	23.31%
1972	11,465	65.31%	6,090	34.69%	0	0.00%
1976	6,610	36.82%	11,342	63.18%	0	0.00%
1980	8,094	40.68%	10,519	52.86%	1,286	6.46%
1984	11,503	53.17%	10,132	46.83%	0	0.00%
1988	11,150	49.66%	11,154	49.68%	148	0.66%
1992	10,459	36.07%	15,403	53.12%	3,136	10.81%
1996	10,504	38.41%	15,206	55.61%	1,636	5.98%
2000	11,850	41.00%	15,167	52.47%	1,887	6.53%
2004	15,052	40.20%	21,718	58.00%	673	1.80%
2008	15,333	33.58%	29,591	64.80%	742	1.62%
2012	13,815	34.10%	25,431	62.77%	1,269	3.13%
2016	12,717	27.96%	29,603	65.10%	3,156	6.94%
2020	14,450	28.10%	36,055	70.12%	916	1.78%
2024	16,049	30.35%	36,297	68.63%	541	1.02%

United States Senate election results for Clarke County, Georgia2
Year	Republican		Democratic		Third party(ies)	
Year	No.	%	No.	%	No.	%
2020	15,078	29.59%	34,549	67.81%	1,323	2.60%
2020	13,311	28.80%	32,901	71.20%	0	0.00%

United States Senate election results for Clarke County, Georgia3
Year	Republican		Democratic		Third party(ies)	
Year	No.	%	No.	%	No.	%
2020	8,050	15.87%	24,636	48.58%	18,028	35.55%
2020	13,009	28.16%	33,187	71.84%	0	0.00%
2022	10,810	26.91%	28,566	71.10%	800	1.99%
2022	9,742	26.23%	27,393	73.77%	0	0.00%

Georgia Gubernatorial election results for Clarke County
Year	Republican		Democratic		Third party(ies)	
Year	No.	%	No.	%	No.	%
2022	13,091	32.47%	26,901	66.73%	324	0.80%

== Transportation ==
=== Major highways ===
- U.S. Route 29 / State Route 8
- U.S. Route 78
  - U.S. Route 78 Business
- U.S. Route 129
- U.S. Route 441 / State Route 15
  - State Route 15 Alternate
- State Route 10
  - State Route 10 Loop / State Route 422 (unsigned)
- State Route 24
- State Route 72

=== Pedestrians and cycling ===
- Athens North Oconee River Greenway
- Firefly Trail

== See also ==
- National Register of Historic Places listings in Clarke County, Georgia
- List of counties in Georgia
