= Campbell County Courthouse (Georgia) =

Historic courthouse in Georgia, US

- U.S. National Register of Historic Places
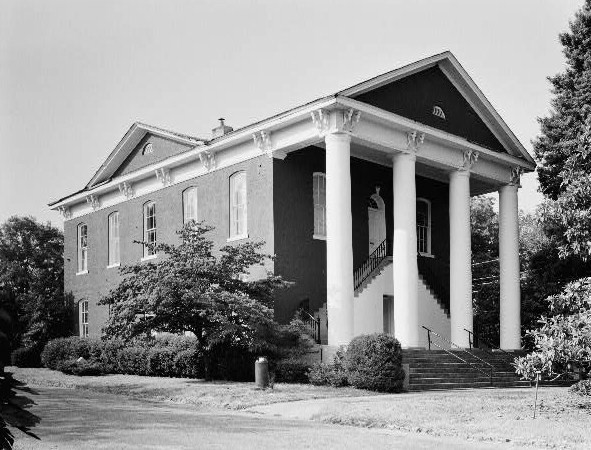
- Campbell County Courthouse in 1980

- Location within Metro Atlanta Location within Georgia Location within the United States
- Location: E. Broad and Cole Sts., Fairburn, Georgia
- Coordinates: 33°34′0″N 84°34′46″W
- Built: 1871
- Architect: Smith & Brother
- Architectural style: Greek Revival
- NRHP reference No.: 76000634
- Added to NRHP: March 26, 1976

The Campbell County Courthouse in Fairburn, Georgia, also known as the Old Campbell County Courthouse, is a Greek Revival brick building that was built in 1871. It was the courthouse for the defunct Campbell County, Georgia, until it merged into Fulton County in 1932.

It is significant in part for being a very late example of 19th-century high classical style in Georgia, as it was built just six years after the American Civil War. During that period there was little construction at all, and continuing construction followed eclectic styles rather than the "purely classical forms" executed in this courthouse's design.

It was listed on the National Register of Historic Places in 1976.
