= Elections in Georgia (U.S. state) =

Elections in Georgia are held to fill various state and federal seats. Regular elections are held every even year. The positions being decided each year vary, as the terms of office vary. The State Senate, State House and U.S. House will typically be up for election, as all of those positions have two-year terms. Special elections are held to fill vacated offices. Georgia is one of seven states that require a run-off election if no candidate receives a majority of the vote in a primary election and the only state that requires a run-off election for state and congressional offices if no candidate wins a majority of the vote in a general election; Louisiana has a similar requirement, but it operates under a different election system.

In a 2018 ranking of U.S. states by perceived electoral integrity (PEI), Georgia ranked 51st among all U.S. states and District of Columbia. While all other states' perceived electoral integrity was valued at very high, high or moderate, Georgia was the only state in the rankings to be designated as a state with low perceived electoral integrity. It scored 49 out of 100 in the 2018 PEI index, getting lowest marks in voting boundaries (18 out of 100) and the highest in Party and candidate registration (67 out of 100). In the 2020 PEI index, Georgia's score had risen from 49 to 74.

A 2020 study ranked Georgia as the second most difficult state for citizens to vote in, primarily for a reduction of polling stations by 50 percent or more since 2012 in parts of the state.

== History ==
Gubernatorial election results
Year	Democratic	Republican
1950	98.4% 230,771	–
1954	99.9% 331,899	–
1958	99.9% 168,414	–
1962	99.9% 311,524	–
1966	46.2% 450,626	46.5% 453,665
1970	59.3% 620,419	40.6% 424,983
1974	69.1% 646,777	30.9% 289,113
1978	80.7% 534,572	19.3% 128,319
1982	62.8% 734,090	37.2% 434,496
1986	70.5% 828,465	29.5% 346,512
1990	52.9% 766,662	44.5% 645,625
1994	51.1% 788,926	48.9% 756,371
1998	52.5% 941,076	44.1% 790,201
2002	46.2% 937,153	51.4% 1,041,702
2006	38.2% 811,049	57.9% 1,229,724
2010	43.0% 1,107,011	53.0% 1,365,832
2014	44.9% 1,144,794	52.7% 1,345,237
2018	48.8% 1,923,685	50.2% 1,978,408
2022	45.9% 1,813,673	53.4% 2,111,572

United States presidential election results for Georgia
Year	Republican / Whig		Democratic		Third party(ies)	
Year	No.	%	No.	%	No.	%
1828	642	3.21%	19,362	96.79%	0	0.00%
1832	0	0.00%	20,750	100.00%	0	0.00%
1836	24,481	51.80%	22,778	48.20%	0	0.00%
1840	40,339	55.78%	31,983	44.22%	0	0.00%
1844	42,100	48.81%	44,147	51.19%	0	0.00%
1848	47,532	51.49%	44,785	48.51%	0	0.00%
1852	16,660	26.60%	40,516	64.70%	5,450	8.70%
1856	0	0.00%	56,581	57.14%	42,439	42.86%
1860	0	0.00%	11,581	10.85%	95,136	89.15%
1868	57,109	35.73%	102,707	64.27%	0	0.00%
1872	62,550	45.03%	76,356	54.97%	0	0.00%
1876	50,533	27.97%	130,157	72.03%	0	0.00%
1880	54,470	34.59%	102,981	65.41%	0	0.00%
1884	48,603	33.84%	94,667	65.92%	340	0.24%
1888	40,499	28.33%	100,493	70.31%	1,944	1.36%
1892	48,408	21.70%	129,446	58.01%	45,272	20.29%
1896	59,395	36.56%	93,885	57.78%	9,200	5.66%
1900	34,260	28.22%	81,180	66.86%	5,970	4.92%
1904	24,004	18.33%	83,466	63.72%	23,516	17.95%
1908	41,355	31.21%	72,350	54.60%	18,799	14.19%
1912	5,191	4.27%	93,087	76.63%	23,192	19.09%
1916	11,294	7.03%	127,754	79.51%	21,633	13.46%
1920	41,089	27.63%	107,162	72.06%	465	0.31%
1924	30,300	18.19%	123,200	73.96%	13,077	7.85%
1928	99,368	43.36%	129,602	56.56%	188	0.08%
1932	19,863	7.77%	234,118	91.60%	1,609	0.63%
1936	36,942	12.60%	255,364	87.10%	872	0.30%
1940	46,360	14.83%	265,194	84.85%	997	0.32%
1944	59,880	18.25%	268,187	81.74%	42	0.01%
1948	76,691	18.31%	254,646	60.81%	87,427	20.88%
1952	198,979	30.34%	456,823	69.66%	1	0.00%
1956	216,652	32.65%	441,094	66.48%	5,734	0.86%
1960	274,472	37.43%	458,638	62.54%	239	0.03%
1964	616,584	54.12%	522,557	45.87%	195	0.02%
1968	380,111	30.40%	334,440	26.75%	535,715	42.85%
1972	881,496	75.04%	289,529	24.65%	3,747	0.32%
1976	483,743	32.96%	979,409	66.74%	4,306	0.29%
1980	654,168	40.95%	890,733	55.76%	52,566	3.29%
1984	1,068,722	60.17%	706,628	39.79%	743	0.04%
1988	1,081,331	59.75%	714,792	39.50%	13,549	0.75%
1992	995,252	42.88%	1,008,966	43.47%	316,915	13.65%
1996	1,080,843	47.01%	1,053,849	45.84%	164,379	7.15%
2000	1,419,720	54.67%	1,116,230	42.98%	60,854	2.34%
2004	1,914,254	57.93%	1,366,149	41.34%	24,078	0.73%
2008	2,048,759	52.10%	1,844,123	46.90%	39,276	1.00%
2012	2,078,688	53.19%	1,773,827	45.39%	55,854	1.43%
2016	2,089,104	50.38%	1,877,963	45.29%	179,758	4.33%
2020	2,461,854	49.24%	2,473,633	49.47%	64,473	1.29%
2024	2,663,117	50.48%	2,548,017	48.30%	63,999	1.21%

Following the end of martial law and readmission to the Union during Reconstruction, Georgia was overwhelmingly dominated by the Democratic Party for a hundred years, as were many other states of the Confederacy. White voters often perceived the Republican Party as the party of the North standing for Yankee values, growing industrialisation, and an excessively powerful and interfering federal government, all arrayed against their localized agricultural society. The abolition of slavery by amendment to the U.S. Constitution and the legacy of an economy damaged by war and social upheaval led many to bitterly oppose a wide variety of national policies.

Elections to the U.S. Congress during this period saw almost exclusively Democratic senators and either totally or almost-totally Democratic House rule. From 1872 to 2002, Georgia voters consistently elected Democrats as governor and Democratic majorities to the state legislature. Like many other Southern states, the Democratic-controlled legislature established run-off elections for primaries in which no candidate receives more than 50% of the vote. In addition, the Democratic primaries were further defined by their usage of the white primary to exclude African Americans and other ethnicities from participation, as well as the usage of the county unit system from 1898 to 1963 to allocate votes to winners along rural-biased lines.

Historically, elections at all levels of government in the U.S. state of Georgia were dominated by conservative white Democrats in the period between Reconstruction and the end of the New Deal Coalition. For decades, Republicans were a tiny minority, generally associated with Union military victory at the end of the Civil War. Indeed, for several years, the Republicans did not even field a candidate for governor or any other statewide elected office.

Beginning in the 1950s, the credible enforcement of new laws inspired by the Civil Rights Movement began to steadily erode the preponderance of Democrats in elective office in Georgia. The repeal of Jim Crow laws allowed previously disenfranchised African Americans to vote in elections and be active in politics. As many of these people joined with some white Democrats to work for more immediate liberal and pluralistic policies, a growing number of conservative white Democrats who supported either gradual change or none at all either began splitting their tickets at the national level or switching outright to the GOP. The strong showing in Georgia by Republican President Dwight D. Eisenhower in the 1956 presidential race proved to be a turning point. Georgia would remain competitive at the national level for most of the rest of the 20th century. The Republican Party appeared positioned to gain even more ground in the coming years. The Democratic Party did not carry the state from the 1960 election until Jimmy Carter ran for the White House 16 years later.

=== Modern times and the shift to Republican control ===
Beginning with Barry Goldwater's presidential bid in 1964, the Republican Party began making inroads in Georgia. The state swung over dramatically to support Goldwater—the first time it had gone Republican in a presidential election in American history. In time, the Republican Party of Georgia would field competitive candidates and win races for seats in the U.S. Senate and U.S. House of Representatives. Republicans also began making gains at the state level, mostly in the Atlanta suburbs. However, conservative Democrats continued to hold most offices at the local level well into the 1990s.

In presidential races, Georgia has given its electoral college votes to the Republican candidate all but five times since 1964: in 1968, segregationist George Wallace won a plurality of Georgia's votes on the American Independent Party ticket; former Georgia Governor Jimmy Carter won his home state by landslide margins in 1976 and 1980 (sweeping every county in the state in 1976); then-Arkansas Governor Bill Clinton won a plurality of votes in 1992 against incumbent Republican George H. W. Bush and Independent Ross Perot; and former Delaware Senator and Vice President Joe Biden won a plurality of votes in 2020 against incumbent Republican Donald Trump. Republican George W. Bush won Georgia by double digits in 2000 and 2004, with 54.67% and 57.97%, respectively, of the vote, making him the only Republican presidential candidate to carry Georgia twice consecutively. In 2008, John McCain won the state by a narrower margin of only 5 points, winning 52% to Democrat Barack Obama's 47%. In 2012, Mitt Romney won the state with 53% to Obama's 45%. In 2016, Donald Trump won the state with 51% to Hillary Clinton's 46%.

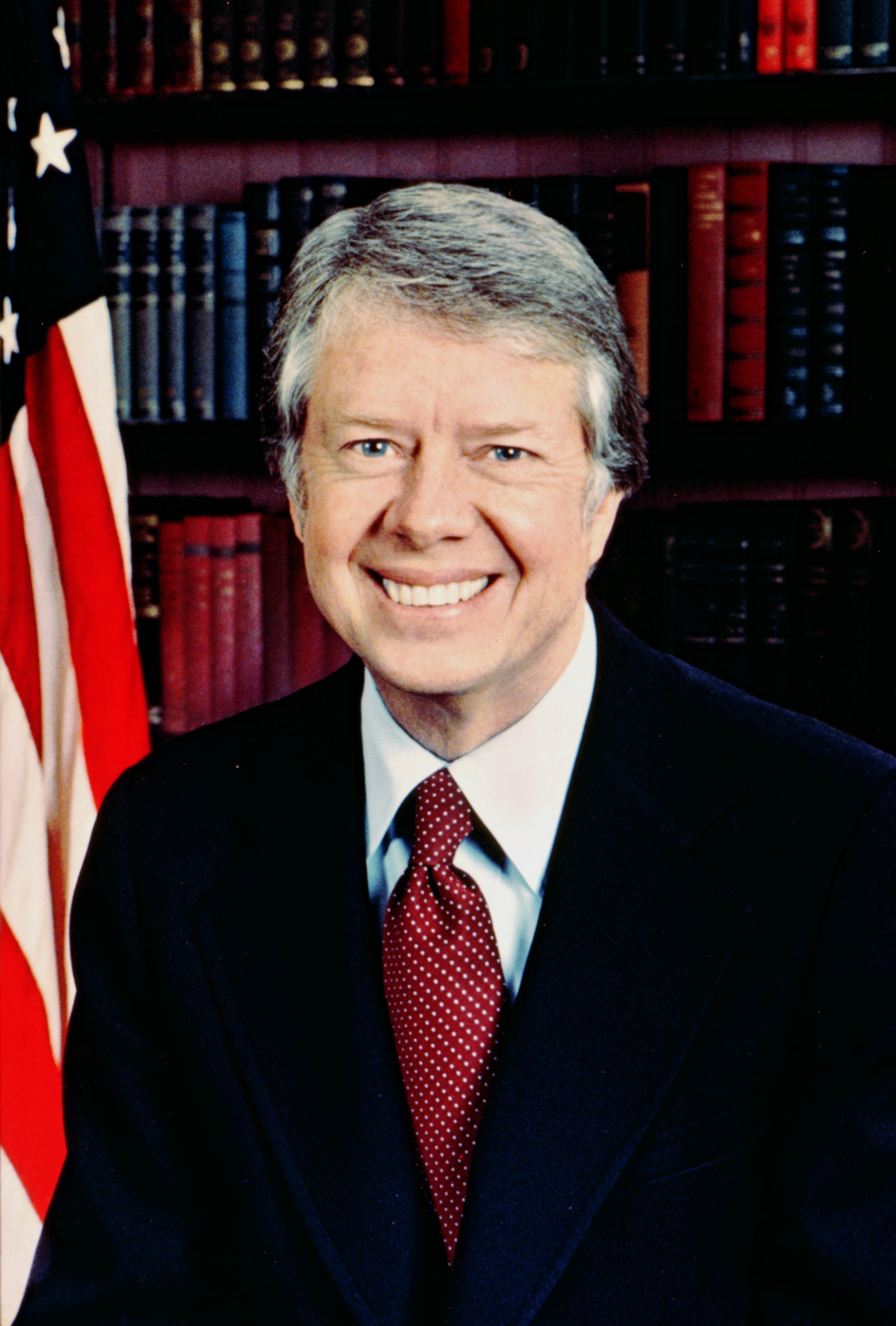
Jimmy Carter, a politician from Plains who was elected to the Georgia State Senate twice and later served a term as Governor of Georgia, became the 39th President of the United States after winning the election of 1976.

By 2007, conservative Republicans had become the dominant force in state elections, with Republicans holding the offices of governor and lieutenant governor and significant majorities in both houses of the state General Assembly.

As in many states, Democratic strongholds in Georgia include urban and minority-dominated areas. Democrats typically fare well in cities such as Atlanta (and its suburbs such as Gwinnett County), Macon, and Columbus, which have large minority populations, as well as Athens, home of the University of Georgia. The Republican Party dominates state elections through its hold on rural south Georgia, with a very notable exception in the southwestern part of the state; the Appalachian north; and many of Atlanta's further suburbs and exurbs. Former Speaker of the United States House of Representatives Newt Gingrich, co-author of the Contract with America and architect of the 1994 "Republican Revolution," represented a district in Cobb County, a suburban Atlanta county which has since flipped to supporting Democratic candidates since 2016.

A feature of Georgia elections is the requirement for 50%-plus-one majorities in general and primary elections, triggering runoff elections if no candidate receives a majority. From 1898 to 1962, the Democratic Party used a combination of the white primary and the county unit system to ensure that only white rural voters' preferences were reflected in the de facto election of political offices across the state, although the white primary was abolished in the federal case King v. Chapman (1945). After the county unit system was struck down by the Supreme Court case Gray v. Sanders (accompanied by the election of Carl Sanders, who became the first Democrat to be nominated for governor by popular vote since the establishment of the county unit system), the General Assembly passed a bill to switch future Georgia elections to runoff voting. The bill was introduced and sponsored by Macon legislator Denmark Groover, who proposed that runoff voting "would again provide protection which … was removed with the death of the county unit system" and warned that "[W]e have got to go the majority vote because all we have to have is a plurality and the Negroes and the pressure groups and special interests are going to manipulate this State and take charge."

However, the following ascendance of the Republican Party culminated in the 1992 defeat of incumbent Wyche Fowler by Republican Paul Coverdell by runoff, despite Fowler leading the first round by a plurality. This led the Georgia Legislature, then controlled by Democrats, to change the state's laws requiring a run-off election only if the winning candidate received less than 45% of the vote. In the 1996 Senate election, the winner, Democrat Max Cleland won with only 48.9% (1.4% ahead of Republican Guy Millner) thus avoiding a run-off. In 2005 after Republicans took control of the legislature, the run-off requirement was changed back to 50%, in the same bill which implemented a requirement for Voter ID.

=== Current status ===
The current Governor of Georgia is Brian Kemp, who was elected as a Republican in 2018. The Lieutenant Governor is Burt Jones. Other elected state executive officials include Secretary of State Brad Raffensperger, Attorney General Chris Carr, Commissioner of Insurance Jim Beck, and Superintendent of Schools Richard Woods.

The Georgia General Assembly has been controlled by the Republicans since 2004. They have majorities over the Democrats in both the Senate and House of Representatives by margins of 33 to 23 and 101 to 78 respectively as of 2023. In congressional elections, the state also sends 14 members to the U.S. House of Representatives.

In 2020, Democrats won both Senate seats and the 2020 Presidential election. The state voted for Joe Biden for president‚ and senators Jon Ossoff, the state's first Jewish senator, and Raphael Warnock, the state's first Black senator. The win was due in part to the increased turnout in African-American voters due to the work of Stacey Abrams and LaTosha Brown. In 2024, Donald Trump flipped Georgia back into the Republican column winning it by 2.2%.

== Election rules ==
=== In-person voting ===
In Louisville, Georgia, in October 2018, Black senior citizens were told to get off a bus that was to have taken them to a polling place for early voting. The bus trip was supposed to have been part of the "South Rising" bus tour sponsored by the advocacy group Black Voters Matter. A clerk of the local Jefferson County Commission allegedly called the intended voters' senior center to claim that the bus tour constituted "political activity," which is barred at events sponsored by the county. LaTosha Brown, one of the founders of Black Voters Matter, described the trip's prevention as a clear-cut case of "...voter intimidation. This is voter suppression, Southern style." The NAACP Legal Defense and Educational Fund sent a letter to the county calling for an "immediate investigation" into the incident, which it condemned as, "an unacceptable act of voter intimidation," that "potentially violates several laws."

Georgia made efforts to correct voting problems that had occurred in the 2018 election. In the 2020 statewide primary, however, many irregularities were reported, including missing machines at polling places and mail-in ballots that never arrived at voters' houses.

=== Voter ID ===
Since 2006, only public university and college students can use their student ID to vote.

=== Voter roll management ===
Georgia's Secretary of State, Brian Kemp, the Republican gubernatorial nominee, was the official in charge of determining whether or not voters were allowed to vote in the November 2018 election and has been accused of voter suppression. Minority voters are statistically more likely to have names that contain hyphens, suffixes or other punctuation that can make it more difficult to match their name in databases, experts noted, and are more likely to have their voter applications suspended by Kemp's office. Barry C. Burden, a professor at the University of Wisconsin-Madison and director of its Elections Research Center said, "An unrealistic rule of this sort will falsely flag many legitimate registration forms. Moreover, the evidence indicates that minority residents are more likely to be flagged than are whites." Kemp has suspended the applications of 53,000 voters, a majority of whom are minorities. Strict voter registration deadlines in Georgia prevented 87,000 Georgians from voting because they had registered after the deadline. "Even if everyone who is on a pending list is eventually allowed to vote, it places more hurdles in the way of those voters on the list, who are disproportionately black and Hispanic," said professor Charles Stewart III in 2018.

Georgia has a law prohibiting felons on probation for crimes involving moral turpitude from voting or registering to vote, with a similar law in Alabama having been criticized by the United States Supreme Court in 471 U.S. 222 (1985) as having roots in white supremacy.

The ACLU of Georgia released a report in 2020 arguing that 200,000 voters were unlawfully removed from voter rolls, which accounted for 63.3% of all voters who were removed.

After 2020, the State Legislature allowed citizens to submit an unlimited number of challenges to people's voter registration. The mass challenges that followed have overwhelmed some election workers around Georgia who are forced to respond to every request even when many of the challenges to voters would have been removed anyway through standard list maintenance.

On July 29, 2024, the state added another way to cancel a voter's registration through an online portal, which has drawn criticism from groups like Fair Fight Action worried that it would be abused to unregister lawful voters. By August 5, cybersecurity researcher Jason Parker discovered a vulnerability in Georgia's voter cancellation portal that allowed users to bypass the requirement for a driver's license number, enabling the submission of voter registration cancellations with minimal, publicly available information. The discovery drew attention to weaknesses in the system and the importance of continued efforts to secure election infrastructure.

=== Election worker protections ===
As a result of lies about the reliability of the 2020 elections, election workers have faced threats to their safety which have required new measures to try and protect the civil servants. Some of the protections in Georgia include signs on the wall warning about suspicious packages, the requirement to wear gloves when opening the mail, new trainings by the Department of Homeland security on "spoofing" and "swatting", and trainings on deescalation tactics should a potentially violent election denier enter a polling place.

=== Election certification ===
In 2021, the State of Georgia changed the rules (Election Integrity Act of 2021) around who can serve on election boards to make it easier for the state to replace board members as a part of a Republican effort to take control of election administration nationwide.

In August 2024, the Georgia State Election Board enacted two new rules that could deputize local election officials more discretion on whether they certify the election, contrary to state and national precedent. The Board also approved a rule in September requiring all counties to hand-count their ballots for comparison to machine counts. Critics think this rule might cause errors and confusion while disrupting the custody of ballots, because ballots typically remain sealed unless a recount is demanded in a challenged election. The recounts could also significantly delay the reporting of election results. On October 16, another Fulton County Superior Court judge found that these new election rules were "illegal, unconstitutional and void", ordering the Board to inform all state and local election officials that the rules were to be disregarded. An appeal of the latter ruling by the RNC was unanimously rejected by the Georgia Supreme Court days later.

== See also ==
- Political party strength in Georgia (U.S. state)
- United States presidential elections in Georgia
- Government of Georgia (U.S. state)
- Politics of Georgia (U.S. state)
- Women's suffrage in Georgia (U.S. state)
- 2020 state elections
- 2024 state elections
- 2026 state elections

=== Presidential elections ===
- 2024 Presidential election
- 2020 Presidential election

=== Presidential primaries ===
- 2024 Democratic Primary
- 2024 Republican Primary

=== Election organizations ===
- New Georgia Project
