= Politics of Georgia (U.S. state) =

Politics in the U.S. state of Georgia

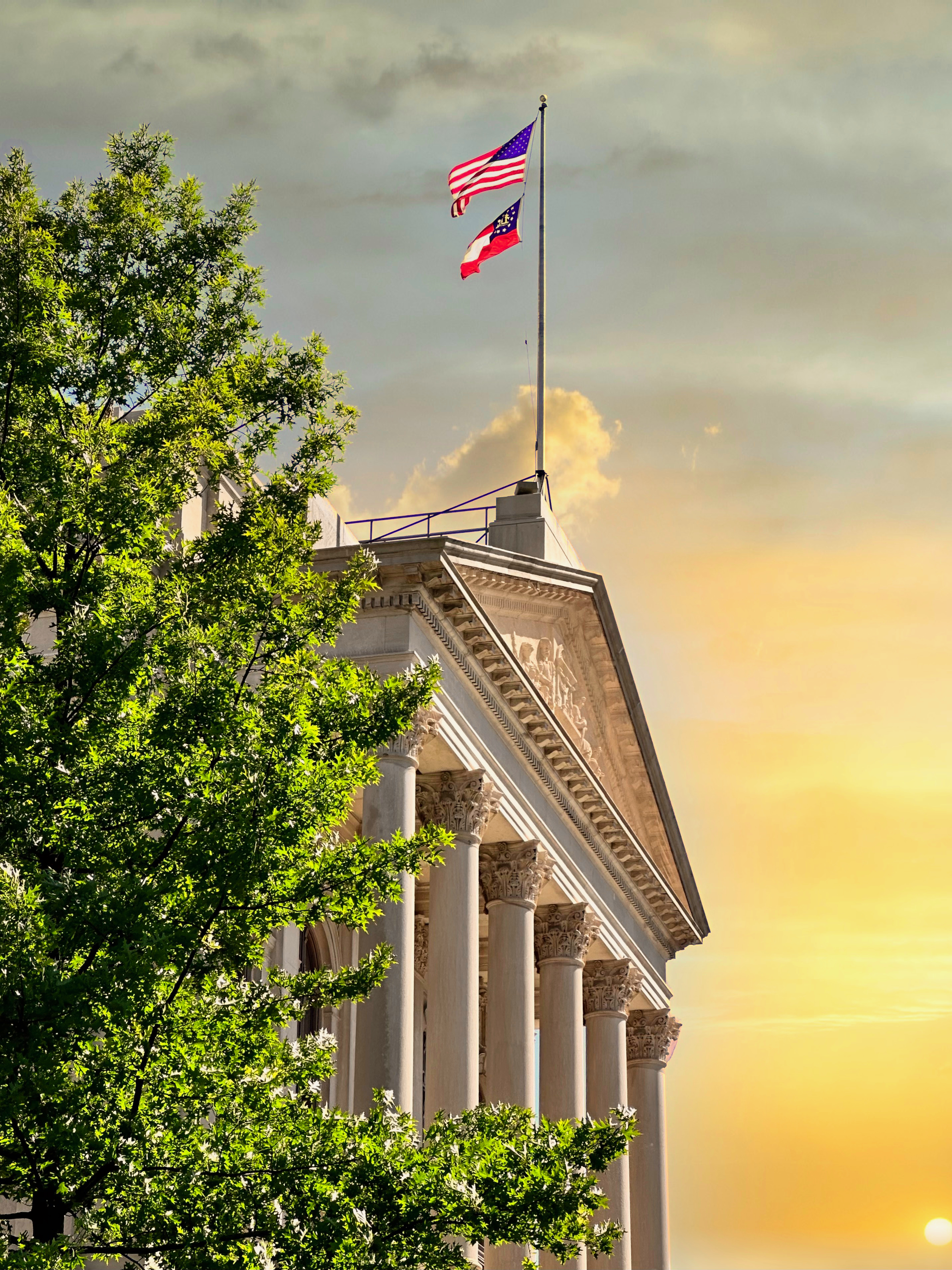
The Georgia State Capitol in 2023.

United States presidential election results for Georgia
Year	Republican / Whig		Democratic		Third party(ies)	
Year	No.	%	No.	%	No.	%
1828	642	3.21%	19,362	96.79%	0	0.00%
1832	0	0.00%	20,750	100.00%	0	0.00%
1836	24,481	51.80%	22,778	48.20%	0	0.00%
1840	40,339	55.78%	31,983	44.22%	0	0.00%
1844	42,100	48.81%	44,147	51.19%	0	0.00%
1848	47,532	51.49%	44,785	48.51%	0	0.00%
1852	16,660	26.60%	40,516	64.70%	5,450	8.70%
1856	0	0.00%	56,581	57.14%	42,439	42.86%
1860	0	0.00%	11,581	10.85%	95,136	89.15%
1868	57,109	35.73%	102,707	64.27%	0	0.00%
1872	62,550	45.03%	76,356	54.97%	0	0.00%
1876	50,533	27.97%	130,157	72.03%	0	0.00%
1880	54,470	34.59%	102,981	65.41%	0	0.00%
1884	48,603	33.84%	94,667	65.92%	340	0.24%
1888	40,499	28.33%	100,493	70.31%	1,944	1.36%
1892	48,408	21.70%	129,446	58.01%	45,272	20.29%
1896	59,395	36.56%	93,885	57.78%	9,200	5.66%
1900	34,260	28.22%	81,180	66.86%	5,970	4.92%
1904	24,004	18.33%	83,466	63.72%	23,516	17.95%
1908	41,355	31.21%	72,350	54.60%	18,799	14.19%
1912	5,191	4.27%	93,087	76.63%	23,192	19.09%
1916	11,294	7.03%	127,754	79.51%	21,633	13.46%
1920	41,089	27.63%	107,162	72.06%	465	0.31%
1924	30,300	18.19%	123,200	73.96%	13,077	7.85%
1928	99,368	43.36%	129,602	56.56%	188	0.08%
1932	19,863	7.77%	234,118	91.60%	1,609	0.63%
1936	36,942	12.60%	255,364	87.10%	872	0.30%
1940	46,360	14.83%	265,194	84.85%	997	0.32%
1944	59,880	18.25%	268,187	81.74%	42	0.01%
1948	76,691	18.31%	254,646	60.81%	87,427	20.88%
1952	198,979	30.34%	456,823	69.66%	1	0.00%
1956	216,652	32.65%	441,094	66.48%	5,734	0.86%
1960	274,472	37.43%	458,638	62.54%	239	0.03%
1964	616,584	54.12%	522,557	45.87%	195	0.02%
1968	380,111	30.40%	334,440	26.75%	535,715	42.85%
1972	881,496	75.04%	289,529	24.65%	3,747	0.32%
1976	483,743	32.96%	979,409	66.74%	4,306	0.29%
1980	654,168	40.95%	890,733	55.76%	52,566	3.29%
1984	1,068,722	60.17%	706,628	39.79%	743	0.04%
1988	1,081,331	59.75%	714,792	39.50%	13,549	0.75%
1992	995,252	42.88%	1,008,966	43.47%	316,915	13.65%
1996	1,080,843	47.01%	1,053,849	45.84%	164,379	7.15%
2000	1,419,720	54.67%	1,116,230	42.98%	60,854	2.34%
2004	1,914,254	57.93%	1,366,149	41.34%	24,078	0.73%
2008	2,048,759	52.10%	1,844,123	46.90%	39,276	1.00%
2012	2,078,688	53.19%	1,773,827	45.39%	55,854	1.43%
2016	2,089,104	50.38%	1,877,963	45.29%	179,758	4.33%
2020	2,461,854	49.24%	2,473,633	49.47%	64,473	1.29%
2024	2,663,117	50.48%	2,548,017	48.30%	63,999	1.21%

Georgia Gubernatorial election results for
Year	Republican		Democratic		Third party(ies)	
Year	No.	%	No.	%	No.	%
2022	2,111,572	53.41%	1,813,673	45.88%	28,163	0.71%

The politics of Georgia change frequently and often follow the rest of the United States in major historical landmarks. The state has a long history, starting in the 18th century as a British colony. The cultural makeup of the early colony led to a ban on slavery being overturned soon after its implementation, setting the stage for the many plantations in the state. Rival governments were formed during the Revolutionary War, with the Patriot government surviving and forming a unified state government after the war. Georgian politics then followed the Democratic-Republican Party before the American Civil War and the Democrats afterward. In fact, the state never voted Republican until 1964, making it the last continental state to do so. Since then, Democrats have won the state just four times, for native son Jimmy Carter in 1976 and 1980, Southerner Bill Clinton in 1992, and for Joe Biden in 2020.

As the political ideologies of the Democratic and Republican parties shifted in the 20th century, Georgia politicians moved to the Republican Party. Republicans won a Senate seat in the state for the first time in history in 1980. Then, Sonny Perdue became the first Republican governor in the state since 1872 upon his election in 2002. In the late 2010s and early 2020s, Georgia became a competitive swing state, with Democrats narrowly winning all statewide federal elections in the 2020 elections, establishing the state as a battleground on the federal level. However, the state of Georgia does currently continue to maintain a Republican lean on the state level and federal, with Republicans controlling every statewide office, having Republican majorities in the State House and Senate, as well as a complete Republican pick on the Georgia Supreme Court. Though losing the US Senate race in 2022, statewide Republicans improved their margins of victory from 2018 to 2022 in Georgia. In 2024, Donald Trump flipped Georgia back into the Republican column, winning it by 2.2%, a margin only 0.72% to the right of the national popular vote and the closest Georgia has come to voting to the left of the nation since Jimmy Carter won the state in 1980.

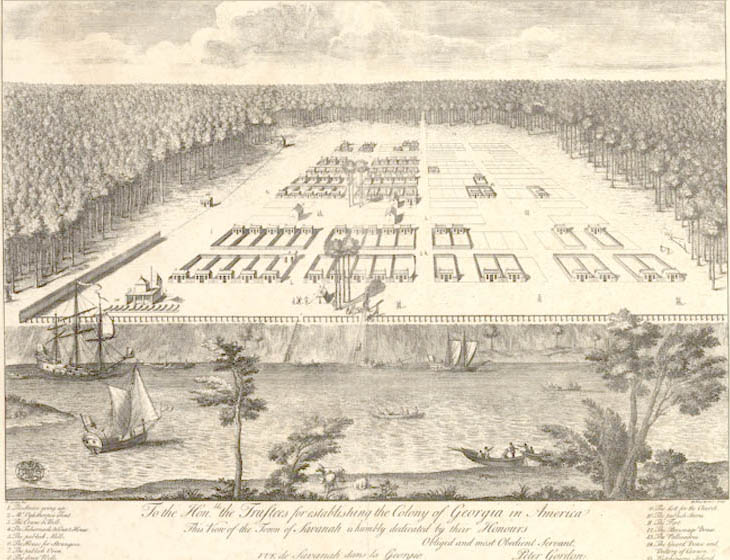
Savannah in its earliest days

== History ==
=== Colonial times ===
The Province of Georgia was founded in 1733 as a British colony by a royal charter through a trust led by James Oglethorpe, a member of Parliament who had originally envisioned it as a place to resettle volunteering debtors instead of sending them to prison. It was named after King George II, the reigning monarch of the Kingdom of Great Britain and the Thirteen Colonies at that time, who later were credited with banning slavery. The province recruited yeomen settlers to occupy land where the native Yamasee had lived before the Yamasee War, acted as a buffer to protect earlier settlements in South Carolina from the Spanish presence in Florida, and hinder West African slaves from escaping and reaching lands beyond the frontier and the control of their owners.

Although most early Georgia colonists were English, Scottish, and German artisans seeking arable land or freedom of religion, many of them complained to their leaders that the ban on slavery created a labor shortage that impeded local finances, compared to other Southern colonies. After Spain failed to conquer the area during the War of Jenkins' Ear, the province legalized slavery in 1749, altering the balance of power in the settlements. Thousands of slaves were imported to work on plantations producing rice, indigo, and sugar. Their owners, mostly South Carolina planters, were wealthier than the early settlers and soon gained most of the official political appointments in the Crown colony that replaced the trusteeship in 1754.

=== Revolutionary War and Antebellum years ===
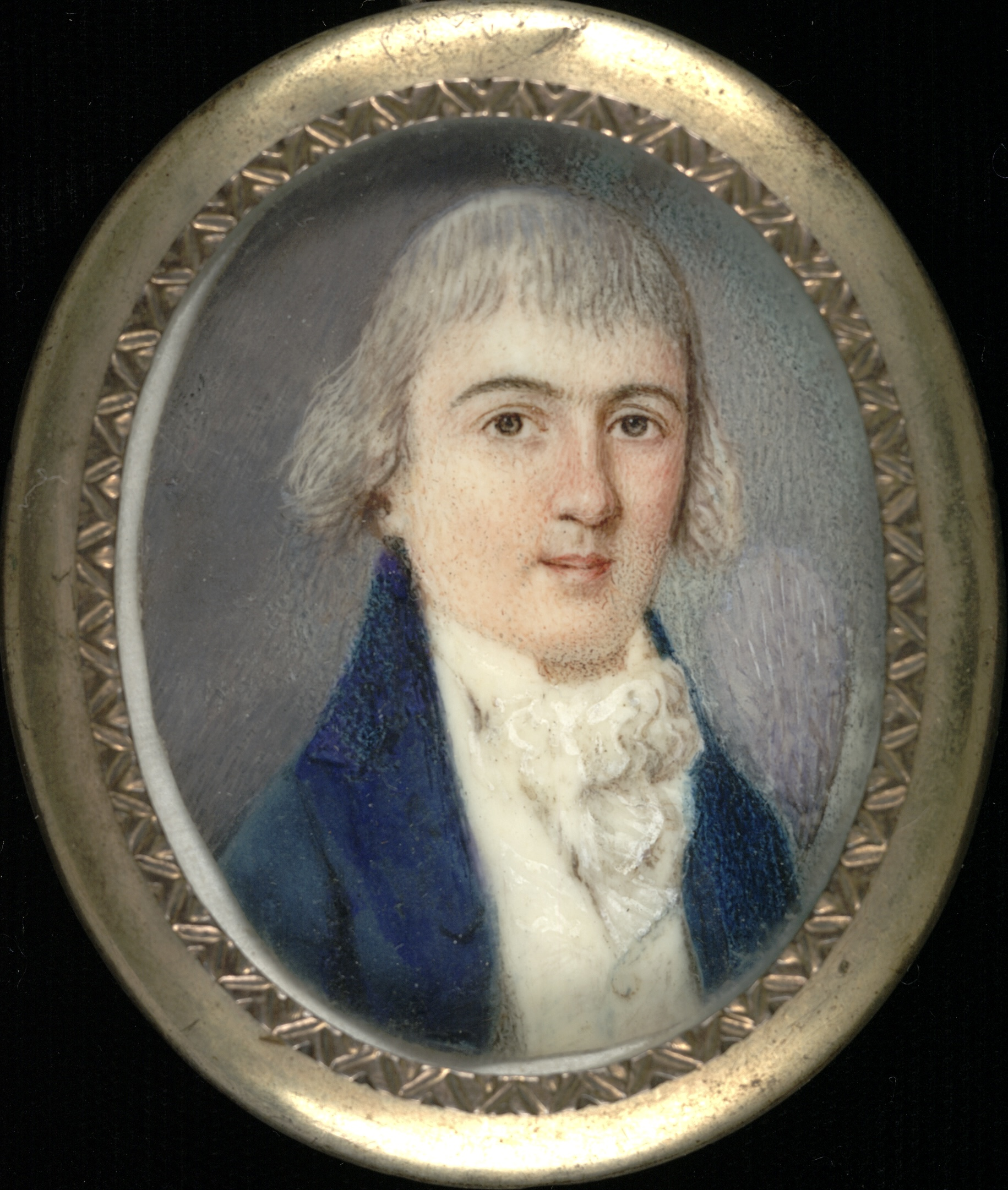
Miniature portrait of Archibald Bulloch, c. 1790

Georgia had two rival governments during the American Revolutionary War: the appointed Loyalist regime of James Wright and the Patriot administration, initially led by planter Archibald Bulloch. After escaping revolutionary forces, Wright fled the colony in 1776 but organized a return in 1778 backed by British military force. After the war, he left again in 1782, evacuating with British forces following the end of hostilities and victory by the rebels. The British also evacuated thousands of slaves to whom they had promised freedom if they left rebel masters. They were resettled in the Caribbean and London.

Bulloch, who died in 1777, and his colleagues founded a republican government. In 1788 Georgia was the fourth state to ratify the new U.S. Constitution.

Georgia had been settled along Atlantic Ocean and the Savannah River. The drive of settlers for westward expansion made territorial issues prominent. An expansion from the Altamaha River to the St. Marys River and the drawing of southern and northern borders neglected a western boundary. The colony assumed it would extend to the Pacific Ocean; a nearer limit was the Mississippi River. The federal government worked to reduce such early colonial claims, in the interest of establishing more states. In addition, nationwide anger among the 13 states about the Yazoo land scandal resulted in Georgia leaders defining their claim in 1802 at the Chattahoochee River up to its head of navigation at the site of modern Columbus and a line running north by west from there.

In the early United States, most Georgia politicians were aligned with the Jeffersonian Democratic-Republican Party, favoring strict constructionism in constitutional law and states' rights over federal power. Unlike the Federalist Party, which backed strong central government, Jeffersonians wanted a freer hand in both Indian removal and expanded plantation slavery. Before the Revolution, Georgia was home to the native Creek and Cherokee. The advent of the cotton gin in 1793, which made short-staple cotton profitable in the uplands of the state, and the Georgia Gold Rush in 1829 spurred runs on land. The Georgia Land Lottery tried to reduce corruption by giving native lands to poorer citizens, but did so as native treaties such as the Treaty of Indian Springs (1825) were broken or revised.

By the 1830s, Georgia politics was split by the Jacksonian Democratic Party and the Anti-Jacksonian Whig Party. Congress passed the Indian Removal Act of 1830, favored by Jackson to void Indian land claims in the Southeast and permit development. The U.S. Supreme Court ruled against Georgia's encroachment on other Indian land in Worcester v. Georgia in 1832, on the grounds that Indian natives were entitled to federal protection. But the ruling was ignored by both presidents and the state, and the federal government proceeded to forcibly remove Indians to west of the Mississippi River. The Cherokee were the last to be forced out, led along what they referred to as the Trail of Tears to Indian Territory, during which many people died.

Former Native American lands were developed for cotton cultivation, and planters brought in thousands of slaves to work the new lands. In 1842 the state legislature declared that black people were non-citizens. After the Compromise of 1850 tried to resolve slavery among the states as an issue of balance of power, the Georgia Platform was accepted by many Southerners as the policy by which secession could be avoided.

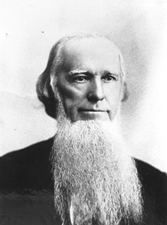
Portrait of Joseph E. Brown, governor of Georgia during the Civil War

=== Civil War years ===
In the 1850s, most state Whigs joined a reinvented Democratic Party that became inflexible on the issues of supporting the expansion of slavery and a highly devolved federalism. The victory of Abraham Lincoln, who was considered a moderate abolitionist, in the presidential election of 1860 was perceived as a threat to Georgia interests. This large slave society was the fifth state to secede from the Union. A founding member of the Confederate States of America in 1861, the state sent tens of thousands of soldiers to fight in the American Civil War.

=== Reconstruction through the 20th century ===
As in other southern states, white conservative Democrats regained control of the state legislature in the 1870s, through a combination of force, intimidation and fraud, with widespread voter suppression of black Republicans. At the turn of the 20th century, Georgia passed a new constitution and amendments that in practice disenfranchised most blacks and many poor whites. The exclusion of blacks from the political system was maintained well into the 1960s. The legislature passed laws to institute legal segregation of public facilities and Jim Crow customs governed many informal rules placing blacks in second-class status.

In the postwar era after World War II, African Americans, particularly veterans, renewed their activism for civil rights, including being able to exercise the franchise. Conservative white Democrats formed the States' Rights Democratic Party, splitting from the national Democratic Party. This group—whose members were called Dixicrats—was very segregationist. It pushed for its candidate Strom Thurmond to be the Democratic presidential nominee in southern states. Georgia was the only Deep South state to reject Harry Truman, the national Democratic nominee, as its candidate. Thurmond ran as a third-party candidate in the state.

During the 1960s and 1970s, Georgia made significant changes in civil rights, governance, and economic growth focused on Atlanta. It was a bedrock of the emerging "New South". In 1983, Georgia's tenth Constitution was ratified, and is the newest state constitution in the United States as of 2015.

== Modern politics ==
In 2002, Sonny Perdue became the first Republican governor since the Reconstruction.

In 2004, its voters passed a ban on same-sex marriage with 76% voting yes. The ban was invalidated in 2015 by the United States Supreme Court case Obergefell v. Hodges.

About half of all appropriations in the Georgia state budget each year are funded by state taxes, with the remainder of revenue coming from federal grants and state bonds.

In the early 2020s, despite a Republican trifecta in the state government, Democrats won all three statewide federal offices. Joe Biden narrowly won the state for his presidential campaign while Jon Ossoff and Raphael Warnock won the U.S. Senate elections, becoming the first Black and Jewish senators from the state, with Ossoff winning a full six-year term and Warnock winning to finish Republican senator Johnny Isakson's term. The wins were reported to be due to the shift of white moderates toward the Democratic Party and the increased turnout of African-American voters. In 2022, incumbent Democratic senator Warnock defeated Republican nominee Herschel Walker in the election, winning a full six-year term in office. Also in 2022, Republicans however did win every statewide office in Georgia by margins of 5-10%, and incumbent Republican governor Brian Kemp won reelection by a raw margin of over 300,000 votes at 7.5% over Democrat Stacey Abrams. In 2024, Donald Trump flipped Georgia back into the Republican column winning it by 2.2%.

The Democratic Party won again during the 2026 United States elections when Keisha Lance Bottoms became the first Black female governor in American history. She is set to be inaugurated in early 2027.

== Federal representation ==
Georgia currently has 14 House districts. In the 118th Congress, five of Georgia's seats are held by Democrats and nine are held by Republicans:

- Georgia's 1st congressional district represented by Buddy Carter (R)
- Georgia's 2nd congressional district represented by Sanford Bishop (D)
- Georgia's 3rd congressional district represented by Brian Jack (R)
- Georgia's 4th congressional district represented by Hank Johnson (D)
- Georgia's 5th congressional district represented by Nikema Williams (D)
- Georgia's 6th congressional district represented by Rich McCormick (R)
- Georgia's 7th congressional district represented by Lucy McBath (D)
- Georgia's 8th congressional district represented by Austin Scott (R)
- Georgia's 9th congressional district represented by Andrew Clyde (R)
- Georgia's 10th congressional district represented by Mike Collins (R)
- Georgia's 11th congressional district represented by Barry Loudermilk (R)
- Georgia's 12th congressional district represented by Rick Allen (R)
- Georgia's 13th congressional district represented by David Scott (D)
- Georgia's 14th congressional district represented by Clay Fuller (R)

Georgia's two United States senators are Democrats Jon Ossoff and Raphael Warnock, both serving since 2021.

Georgia is part of the United States District Court for the Northern District of Georgia, the United States District Court for the Middle District of Georgia, and the United States District Court for the Southern District of Georgia in the federal judiciary. The district's cases are appealed to the Atlanta-based United States Court of Appeals for the Eleventh Circuit.

== See also ==
- Government of Georgia (U.S. state)
- Elections in Georgia (U.S. state)
- Official Code of Georgia
- Democratic Party of Georgia
- Georgia Republican Party
