= Politics of Georgia =

Politics of Georgia may refer to:

- Politics of Georgia (country)
- Politics of Georgia (U.S. state)
