= Elections in Georgia =

Elections in Georgia may refer to:

- Elections in Georgia (country)
- Elections in Georgia (U.S. state)
