= United States presidential elections in Georgia =

Presidential elections in Georgia
- Number of elections: 58
- Voted Democratic: 32
- Voted Republican: 11
- Voted Whig: 3
- Voted Democratic-Republican: 8
- Voted other: 3 (Note: George Washington, 1788-89, 1792; George Wallace, 1968)
- Voted for winning candidate: 37
- Voted for losing candidate: 21

Following is a table of United States presidential elections in Georgia, ordered by year. Since its admission to statehood in 1788, Georgia has participated in every U.S. presidential election except the election of 1864, when it had seceded in the American Civil War.

Winners of the state are in bold. The shading refers to the state winner, and not the national winner.

== Elections from 1864 to present ==
View source data.

Year	Winner (nationally)	Votes	Percent	Runner-up (nationally)	Votes	Percent	Other national candidates (Note: For purposes of these lists, other national candidates are defined as those who won at least one electoral vote, or won at least ten percent of the vote in multiple states.)	Votes	Percent	Electoral votes	Notes
2024	**Donald Trump**	2,663,117	50.73	Kamala Harris	2,548,017	48.53	—			16	
2020	**Joe Biden**	2,473,633	49.47	Donald Trump	2,461,854	49.24	—			16	
2016	**Donald Trump** (Note: Won the electoral college while losing the popular vote)	2,089,104	50.44	Hillary Clinton	1,877,963	45.35	—			16	
2012	Barack Obama	1,773,827	45.48	**Mitt Romney**	2,078,688	53.30	—			16	
2008	Barack Obama	1,844,123	46.99	**John McCain**	2,048,759	52.20	—			15	
2004	**George W. Bush**	1,914,254	57.97	John Kerry	1,366,149	41.37	—			15	
2000	**George W. Bush**	1,419,720	54.67	Al Gore	1,116,230	42.98	—			13	
1996	Bill Clinton	1,053,849	45.84	**Bob Dole**	1,080,843	47.01	Ross Perot	146,337	6.37	13	
1992	**Bill Clinton**	1,008,966	43.47	George H. W. Bush	995,252	42.88	Ross Perot	309,657	13.34	13	
1988	**George H. W. Bush**	1,081,331	59.75	Michael Dukakis	714,792	39.50	—			12	
1984	**Ronald Reagan**	1,068,722	60.17	Walter Mondale	706,628	39.79	—			12	
1980	Ronald Reagan	654,168	40.95	**Jimmy Carter**	890,733	55.76	John B. Anderson	36,055	2.26	12	
1976	**Jimmy Carter**	979,409	66.74	Gerald Ford	483,743	32.96	—			12	
1972	**Richard Nixon**	881,496	75.04	George McGovern	289,529	24.65	—			12	
1968	Richard Nixon	380,111	30.40	Hubert Humphrey	334,440	26.75	**George Wallace**	535,550	42.83	12	
1964	Lyndon B. Johnson	522,557	45.87	**Barry Goldwater**	616,584	54.12	—			12	
1960	**John F. Kennedy**	458,638	62.54	Richard Nixon	274,472	37.43	—			12	
1956	Dwight D. Eisenhower	216,652	32.65	**Adlai Stevenson II**	441,094	66.48	T. Coleman Andrews/ Unpledged Electors (Note: Was allied with a slate of unpledged electors in Louisiana, Mississippi and South Carolina)	—		12	
1952	Dwight D. Eisenhower	198,979	30.34	**Adlai Stevenson II**	456,823	69.66	—			12	
1948	**Harry S. Truman**	254,646	60.81	Thomas E. Dewey	76,691	18.31	Strom Thurmond	85,055	20.31	12	
1944	**Franklin D. Roosevelt**	268,187	81.74	Thomas E. Dewey	59,880	18.25	—			12	
1940	**Franklin D. Roosevelt**	265,194	84.85	Wendell Willkie	46,360	14.83	—			12	
1936	**Franklin D. Roosevelt**	255,364	87.10	Alf Landon	36,942	12.60	—			12	
1932	**Franklin D. Roosevelt**	234,118	91.60	Herbert Hoover	19,863	7.77	—			12	
1928	Herbert Hoover	99,369	43.36	**Al Smith**	129,602	56.56	—			14	
1924	Calvin Coolidge	30,300	18.19	**John W. Davis**	123,200	73.96	Robert M. La Follette	12,691	7.62	14	
1920	Warren G. Harding	41,089	27.72	**James M. Cox**	107,162	72.28	Parley P. Christensen	—	—	14	
1916	**Woodrow Wilson**	127,754	79.51	Charles E. Hughes	11,294	7.03	—			14	
1912	**Woodrow Wilson**	93,087	76.63	Theodore Roosevelt	21,985	18.10	William H. Taft	5,191	4.27	14	
1908	William H. Taft	41,355	31.21	**William Jennings Bryan**	72,350	54.60	—			13	
1904	Theodore Roosevelt	24,004	18.33	**Alton B. Parker**	83,466	63.72	—			13	
1900	William McKinley	34,260	28.22	**William Jennings Bryan**	81,180	66.86	—			13	
1896	William McKinley	59,395	36.56	**William Jennings Bryan**	93,885	57.78	—			13	
1892	**Grover Cleveland**	129,446	58.01	Benjamin Harrison	48,408	21.70	James B. Weaver	41,939	18.8	13	
1888	Benjamin Harrison	40,499	28.33	**Grover Cleveland**	100,493	70.31	—			12	
1884	**Grover Cleveland**	94,667	65.92	James G. Blaine	48,603	33.84	—			12	
1880	James A. Garfield	54,470	34.59	**Winfield S. Hancock**	102,981	65.41	—			11	
1876	Rutherford B. Hayes	50,533	27.97	**Samuel J. Tilden**	130,157	72.03	—			11	
1872	Ulysses S. Grant	62,550	45.03	**Horace Greeley**	76,356	54.97	—			11	
1868	Ulysses S. Grant	57,109	35.7	**Horatio Seymour**	102,707	64.3	—			9	
1864	Abraham Lincoln			George B. McClellan			—			n/a	No vote due to secession.

== Election of 1860 ==
The election of 1860 was a complex realigning election in which the breakdown of the previous two-party alignment culminated in four parties each competing for influence in different parts of the country. The result of the election, with the victory of an ardent opponent of slavery, spurred the secession of eleven states and brought about the American Civil War.

Year	Winner (nationally)	Votes	Percent	Runner-up (nationally)	Votes	Percent	Runner-up (nationally)	Votes	Percent	Runner-up (nationally)	Votes	Percent	Electoral votes
1860	Abraham Lincoln	no ballots		Stephen A. Douglas	11,581	10.9	**John C. Breckinridge**	52,176	48.9	John Bell	42,960	40.3	10

== Elections from 1828 to 1856 ==
Year	Winner (nationally)	Votes	Percent	Runner-up (nationally)	Votes	Percent	Other national candidates	Votes	Percent	Electoral votes	Notes
1856	**James Buchanan**	56,581	57.14	John C. Frémont	no ballots		Millard Fillmore	42,439	42.86	10	
1852	**Franklin Pierce**	40,516	64.7	Winfield Scott	16,660	26.6	John P. Hale	no ballots		10	
1848	**Zachary Taylor**	47,532	51.49	Lewis Cass	44,785	48.51	Martin Van Buren	no ballots		10	
1844	**James K. Polk**	44,147	51.19	Henry Clay	42,100	48.81	—			10	
1840	**William Henry Harrison**	40,339	55.78	Martin Van Buren	31,983	44.22	—			11	
1836	Martin Van Buren	22,778	48.2	**Hugh Lawson White**	24,481	51.8	various (Note: Three other candidates ran and received electoral votes nationally as part of the unsuccessful Whig strategy to defeat Martin Van Buren by running four candidates with local appeal in different regions of the country. The others were William Henry Harrison, Daniel Webster, and Willie Person Mangum. None of these candidates appeared on the ballot in Georgia.)			11	
1832	**Andrew Jackson**	20,750	100	Henry Clay	no ballots		William Wirt	no ballots		11	
1828	**Andrew Jackson**	19,362	96.79	John Quincy Adams	642	3.21	—			9	

== Election of 1824 ==
The election of 1824 was a complex realigning election following the collapse of the prevailing Democratic-Republican Party, resulting in four different candidates each claiming to carry the banner of the party, and competing for influence in different parts of the country. The election was the only one in history to be decided by the House of Representatives under the provisions of the Twelfth Amendment to the United States Constitution after no candidate secured a majority of the electoral vote. It was also the only presidential election in which the candidate who received a plurality of electoral votes (Andrew Jackson) did not become president, a source of great bitterness for Jackson and his supporters, who proclaimed the election of Adams a corrupt bargain.

Year	Winner (nationally)	Votes	Runner-up (nationally)	Votes	Runner-up (nationally)	Votes	Runner-up (nationally)	Votes	Electoral votes
1824	Andrew Jackson	no popular vote	John Quincy Adams	no popular vote	Henry Clay	no popular vote	**William H. Crawford**	no popular vote	9

== Elections from 1788-89 to 1820 ==
In the election of 1820, incumbent President James Monroe ran effectively unopposed, winning all 8 of Georgia's electoral votes, and all electoral votes nationwide except one vote in New Hampshire. To the extent that a popular vote was held, it was primarily directed to filling the office of vice president.

Year	Winner (nationally)	Runner-up (nationally)	Electoral votes	Notes
1820	**James Monroe**	-	8	Monroe effectively ran unopposed.
1816	**James Monroe**	Rufus King	8	
1812	**James Madison**	DeWitt Clinton	8	
1808	**James Madison**	Charles C. Pinckney	6	
1804	**Thomas Jefferson**	Charles C. Pinckney	6	
1800	**Thomas Jefferson**	John Adams	4	
1796	John Adams	**Thomas Jefferson**	4	
1792	**George Washington**	-	4	Washington effectively ran unopposed.
1788-89	**George Washington**	-	5	Washington effectively ran unopposed.

== See also ==
- Elections in Georgia (U.S. state)
