= 1804 United States presidential election in Georgia =

- November 14, 1804
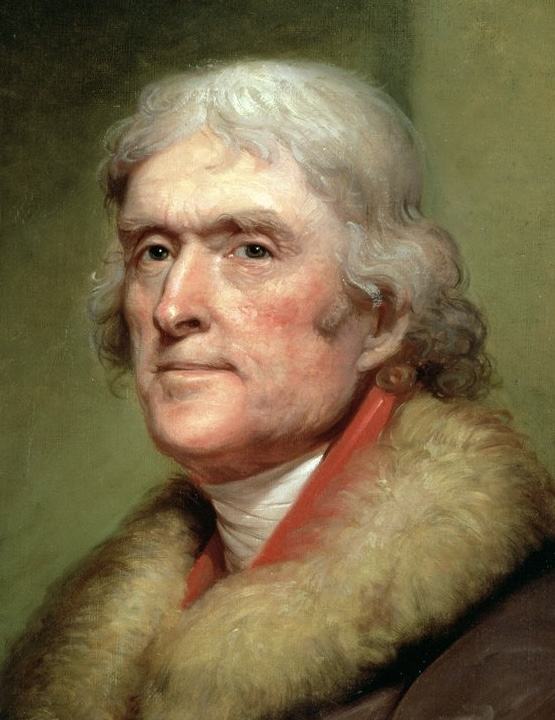
Nominee	Thomas Jefferson
Party	Democratic-Republican
Home state	Virginia
Running mate	George Clinton
Electoral vote	6
President before election
Thomas Jefferson
Democratic-Republican
Elected President
Thomas Jefferson
Democratic-Republican

A presidential election was held in Georgia on November 14, 1804. The Georgia General Assembly chose six electors, all Democratic-Republicans, who voted for the incumbent president, Thomas Jefferson, and the former New York governor, George Clinton. Jefferson won the national election in a landslide over the Federalist former U.S. minister to France, Charles Cotesworth Pinckney.

== General election ==
1804 United States presidential election in Georgia
Party	Candidate
Democratic-Republican	David Creswell
Democratic-Republican	David Emanuel
Democratic-Republican	Henry Graybill
Democratic-Republican	James B. Maxwell
Democratic-Republican	John Rutherford
Democratic-Republican	Edward Telfair

== See also ==
- United States presidential elections in Georgia

== Bibliography ==
- Dauer, Manning Julian (2002). "Election of 1804". In Schlesinger, Arthur M. Jr.; Israel, Fred L. (eds.). History of American Presidential Elections, 1789–2001. Vol. 1. Philadelphia: Chelsea House Publishers. pp. 159–82.
- Lampi, Philip J. (2012). "Georgia 1804 Electoral College". A New Nation Votes. American Antiquarian Society.
