= 1884 United States presidential election in Georgia =

- November 4, 1884

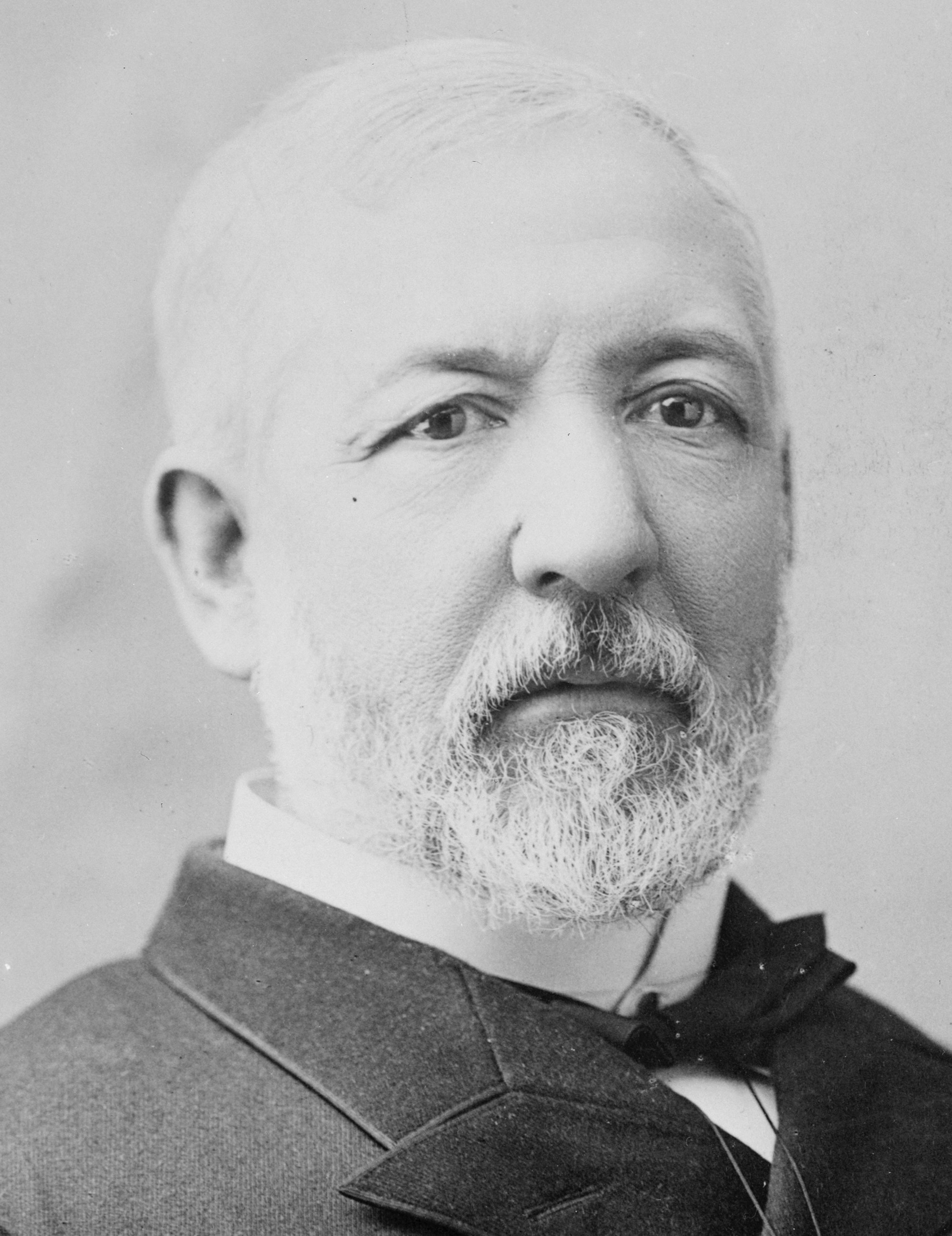
Nominee	Grover Cleveland	James G. Blaine
Party	Democratic	Republican
Home state	New York	Maine
Running mate	Thomas Hendricks	John A. Logan
Electoral vote	12	0
Popular vote	94,667	48,603
Percentage	65.92%	33.84%
County results
Cleveland
50–60%
60–70%
70–80%
80–90%
90–100%
Blaine
50–60%
60–70%
70–80%
President before election
Chester A. Arthur
Republican
Elected President
Grover Cleveland
Democratic

The 1884 United States presidential election in Georgia took place on November 4, 1884, as part of the wider United States presidential election. Voters chose twelve representatives, or electors, to the Electoral College, who voted for president and vice president.

Following Reconstruction, Georgia would be the first former Confederate state to substantially disenfranchise its newly enfranchised freedmen and many poor whites, doing so in the early 1870s. This largely limited the Republican Party to a few North Georgia counties with substantial Civil War Unionist sentiment – chiefly Fannin but also to a lesser extent Pickens, Gilmer and Towns – and in presidential elections to a small number of counties elsewhere where blacks were not fully disenfranchised. The Democratic Party served as the guardian of white supremacy against a Republican Party historically associated with memories of Reconstruction, and the main competition became Democratic primaries, which were restricted to whites on the grounds of the Democratic Party being legally a private club. This restriction was done by local county laws, but combined with the highly efficacious cumulative poll tax introduced in 1877 meant that turnout declined steadily throughout the 1880s, unlike any other former Confederate state except South Carolina.

Despite economic problems in the mountain counties due to deflation produced by the gold standard and large-scale government spending reductions by the “Redeemer” Democrats, voter turnout, especially for opposition parties, would maintain its poll tax-driven decline until the Populist movement, which did not begin until five years after the 1884 election. Consequently, Cleveland and Hendricks were able to stabilize the decline from 1880, again carrying Georgia by almost a two-to-one margin.

In Burke County, Georgia, 895 votes were cast for bolting "Whig Republican" electors for president (they were not counted for James G. Blaine).

== Results ==
1884 United States presidential election in Georgia
Party	Candidate	Votes	Percentage	Electoral votes
Democratic	Grover Cleveland	94,667	65.92%	12
Republican	James Blaine	48,603	33.84%	0
Prohibition	John St. John	195 (Note: Votes for candidates other than the Republican and Democratic were not separated by county but listed only as a state-wide total. They are included in the statewide total at the bottom of the county table.)	0.14%	0
Greenback	Benjamin Butler	145	0.10%	0

=== Results by county ===
County	Stephen Grover Cleveland Democratic		James Gillespie Blaine Republican		Margin		Total votes cast
County	#	%	#	%	#	%	Total votes cast
Appling	503	59.32%	345	40.68%	158	18.63%	848
Baker	424	100.00%	0	0.00%	424	100.00%	424
Baldwin	533	83.15%	108	16.85%	425	66.30%	641
Banks	500	75.30%	164	24.70%	336	50.60%	664
Bartow	1,035	63.93%	584	36.07%	451	27.86%	1,619
Berrien	673	90.34%	72	9.66%	601	80.67%	745
Bibb	1,727	66.83%	857	33.17%	870	33.67%	2,584
Brooks	768	51.86%	713	48.14%	55	3.71%	1,481
Bryan	253	51.42%	239	48.58%	14	2.85%	492
Bulloch	773	91.16%	75	8.84%	698	82.31%	848
Burke	558	38.40%	895	61.60%	-337	-23.19%	1,453
Butts	638	54.76%	527	45.24%	111	9.53%	1,165
Calhoun	330	51.32%	313	48.68%	17	2.64%	643
Camden	170	31.89%	363	68.11%	-193	-36.21%	533
Campbell	665	66.50%	335	33.50%	330	33.00%	1,000
Carroll	2,058	80.48%	499	19.52%	1,559	60.97%	2,557
Catoosa	443	79.53%	114	20.47%	329	59.07%	557
Charlton	194	87.78%	27	12.22%	167	75.57%	221
Chatham	3,144	64.28%	1,747	35.72%	1,397	28.56%	4,891
Chattahoochee	445	57.57%	328	42.43%	117	15.14%	773
Chattooga	793	80.59%	191	19.41%	602	61.18%	984
Cherokee	865	86.07%	140	13.93%	725	72.14%	1,005
Clarke	778	50.42%	765	49.58%	13	0.84%	1,543
Clay	367	55.44%	295	44.56%	72	10.88%	662
Clayton	505	64.41%	279	35.59%	226	28.83%	784
Clinch	429	86.32%	68	13.68%	361	72.64%	497
Cobb	1,372	71.91%	536	28.09%	836	43.82%	1,908
Coffee	225	88.24%	30	11.76%	195	76.47%	255
Colquitt	151	79.47%	39	20.53%	112	58.95%	190
Columbia	402	100.00%	0	0.00%	402	100.00%	402
Coweta	1,489	52.90%	1,326	47.10%	163	5.79%	2,815
Crawford	304	65.66%	159	34.34%	145	31.32%	463
Dade	450	73.89%	159	26.11%	291	47.78%	609
Dawson	287	82.95%	59	17.05%	228	65.90%	346
DeKalb	1,025	69.49%	450	30.51%	575	38.98%	1,475
Decatur	816	47.78%	892	52.22%	-76	-4.45%	1,708
Dodge	476	58.12%	343	41.88%	133	16.24%	819
Dooly	879	84.76%	158	15.24%	721	69.53%	1,037
Dougherty	317	76.02%	100	23.98%	217	52.04%	417
Douglas	458	69.08%	205	30.92%	253	38.16%	663
Early	710	74.19%	247	25.81%	463	48.38%	957
Echols	186	67.15%	91	32.85%	95	34.30%	277
Effingham	369	71.37%	148	28.63%	221	42.75%	517
Elbert	885	95.78%	39	4.22%	846	91.56%	924
Emanuel	784	81.24%	181	18.76%	603	62.49%	965
Fannin	282	38.95%	442	61.05%	-160	-22.10%	724
Fayette	578	70.15%	246	29.85%	332	40.29%	824
Floyd	1,654	65.71%	863	34.29%	791	31.43%	2,517
Forsyth	557	80.26%	137	19.74%	420	60.52%	694
Franklin	659	74.89%	221	25.11%	438	49.77%	880
Fulton	1,939	67.70%	925	32.30%	1,014	35.41%	2,864
Gilmer	373	71.73%	147	28.27%	226	43.46%	520
Glascock	251	89.64%	29	10.36%	222	79.29%	280
Glynn	437	39.87%	659	60.13%	-222	-20.26%	1,096
Gordon	885	87.54%	126	12.46%	759	75.07%	1,011
Greene	755	47.57%	832	52.43%	-77	-4.85%	1,587
Gwinnett	1,094	88.23%	146	11.77%	948	76.45%	1,240
Habersham	534	81.03%	125	18.97%	409	62.06%	659
Hall	1,242	82.74%	259	17.26%	983	65.49%	1,501
Hancock	642	83.81%	124	16.19%	518	67.62%	766
Haralson	530	100.00%	0	0.00%	530	100.00%	530
Harris	1,197	58.22%	859	41.78%	338	16.44%	2,056
Hart	701	80.39%	171	19.61%	530	60.78%	872
Heard	818	71.57%	325	28.43%	493	43.13%	1,143
Henry	933	57.34%	694	42.66%	239	14.69%	1,627
Houston	1,300	75.01%	433	24.99%	867	50.03%	1,733
Irwin	300	89.29%	36	10.71%	264	78.57%	336
Jackson	1,082	72.47%	411	27.53%	671	44.94%	1,493
Jasper	428	49.54%	436	50.46%	-8	-0.93%	864
Jefferson	610	56.12%	477	43.88%	133	12.24%	1,087
Johnson	284	98.27%	5	1.73%	279	96.54%	289
Jones	498	60.95%	319	39.05%	179	21.91%	817
Laurens	621	73.32%	226	26.68%	395	46.64%	847
Lee	435	46.57%	499	53.43%	-64	-6.85%	934
Liberty	472	35.95%	841	64.05%	-369	-28.10%	1,313
Lincoln	385	100.00%	0	0.00%	385	100.00%	385
Lowndes	648	52.01%	598	47.99%	50	4.01%	1,246
Lumpkin	366	71.62%	145	28.38%	221	43.25%	511
Macon	661	50.42%	650	49.58%	11	0.84%	1,311
Madison	589	69.46%	259	30.54%	330	38.92%	848
Marion	752	69.05%	337	30.95%	415	38.11%	1,089
McDuffie	423	68.45%	195	31.55%	228	36.89%	618
McIntosh	204	20.97%	769	79.03%	-565	-58.07%	973
Meriwether	1,464	56.94%	1,107	43.06%	357	13.89%	2,571
Miller	115	100.00%	0	0.00%	115	100.00%	115
Milton	497	89.71%	57	10.29%	440	79.42%	554
Mitchell	435	57.16%	326	42.84%	109	14.32%	761
Monroe	1,243	71.31%	500	28.69%	743	42.63%	1,743
Montgomery	457	70.74%	189	29.26%	268	41.49%	646
Morgan	676	52.90%	602	47.10%	74	5.79%	1,278
Murray	668	73.57%	240	26.43%	428	47.14%	908
Muscogee	1,951	76.78%	590	23.22%	1,361	53.56%	2,541
Newton	802	50.31%	792	49.69%	10	0.63%	1,594
Oconee	434	58.02%	314	41.98%	120	16.04%	748
Oglethorpe	492	89.13%	60	10.87%	432	78.26%	552
Paulding	689	75.71%	221	24.29%	468	51.43%	910
Pickens	298	46.86%	338	53.14%	-40	-6.29%	636
Pierce	460	70.02%	197	29.98%	263	40.03%	657
Pike	908	57.04%	684	42.96%	224	14.07%	1,592
Polk	607	59.39%	415	40.61%	192	18.79%	1,022
Pulaski	983	77.34%	288	22.66%	695	54.68%	1,271
Putnam	519	100.00%	0	0.00%	519	100.00%	519
Quitman	159	79.10%	42	20.90%	117	58.21%	201
Rabun	229	97.86%	5	2.14%	224	95.73%	234
Randolph	669	59.95%	447	40.05%	222	19.89%	1,116
Richmond	3,293	62.87%	1,945	37.13%	1,348	25.74%	5,238
Rockdale	508	69.30%	225	30.70%	283	38.61%	733
Schley	406	57.43%	301	42.57%	105	14.85%	707
Screven	1,037	80.83%	246	19.17%	791	61.65%	1,283
Spalding	691	52.59%	623	47.41%	68	5.18%	1,314
Stewart	684	76.77%	207	23.23%	477	53.54%	891
Sumter	1,186	62.03%	726	37.97%	460	24.06%	1,912
Talbot	907	40.53%	1,331	59.47%	-424	-18.95%	2,238
Taliaferro	418	61.38%	263	38.62%	155	22.76%	681
Tattnall	645	71.91%	252	28.09%	393	43.81%	897
Taylor	773	63.73%	440	36.27%	333	27.45%	1,213
Telfair	477	79.90%	120	20.10%	357	59.80%	597
Terrell	541	66.06%	278	33.94%	263	32.11%	819
Thomas	290	50.09%	289	49.91%	1	0.17%	579
Towns	165	52.88%	147	47.12%	18	5.77%	312
Troup	1,200	72.16%	463	27.84%	737	44.32%	1,663
Twiggs	268	62.04%	164	37.96%	104	24.07%	432
Union	377	68.17%	176	31.83%	201	36.35%	553
Upson	778	67.53%	374	32.47%	404	35.07%	1,152
Walker	770	75.64%	248	24.36%	522	51.28%	1,018
Walton	1,017	75.84%	324	24.16%	693	51.68%	1,341
Ware	365	67.10%	179	32.90%	186	34.19%	544
Warren	521	78.58%	142	21.42%	379	57.16%	663
Washington	1,083	53.56%	939	46.44%	144	7.12%	2,022
Wayne	449	69.29%	199	30.71%	250	38.58%	648
Webster	353	57.49%	261	42.51%	92	14.98%	614
White	317	85.68%	53	14.32%	264	71.35%	370
Whitfield	883	60.77%	570	39.23%	313	21.54%	1,453
Wilcox	397	90.23%	43	9.77%	354	80.45%	440
Wilkes	785	100.00%	0	0.00%	785	100.00%	785
Wilkinson	625	68.38%	289	31.62%	336	36.76%	914
Worth	420	70.23%	178	29.77%	242	40.47%	598
Totals	94,659	65.93%	48,580	33.84%	46,079	32.09%	143,579

== See also ==
- United States presidential elections in Georgia
