= 1844 United States presidential election in Georgia =

- November 4, 1844

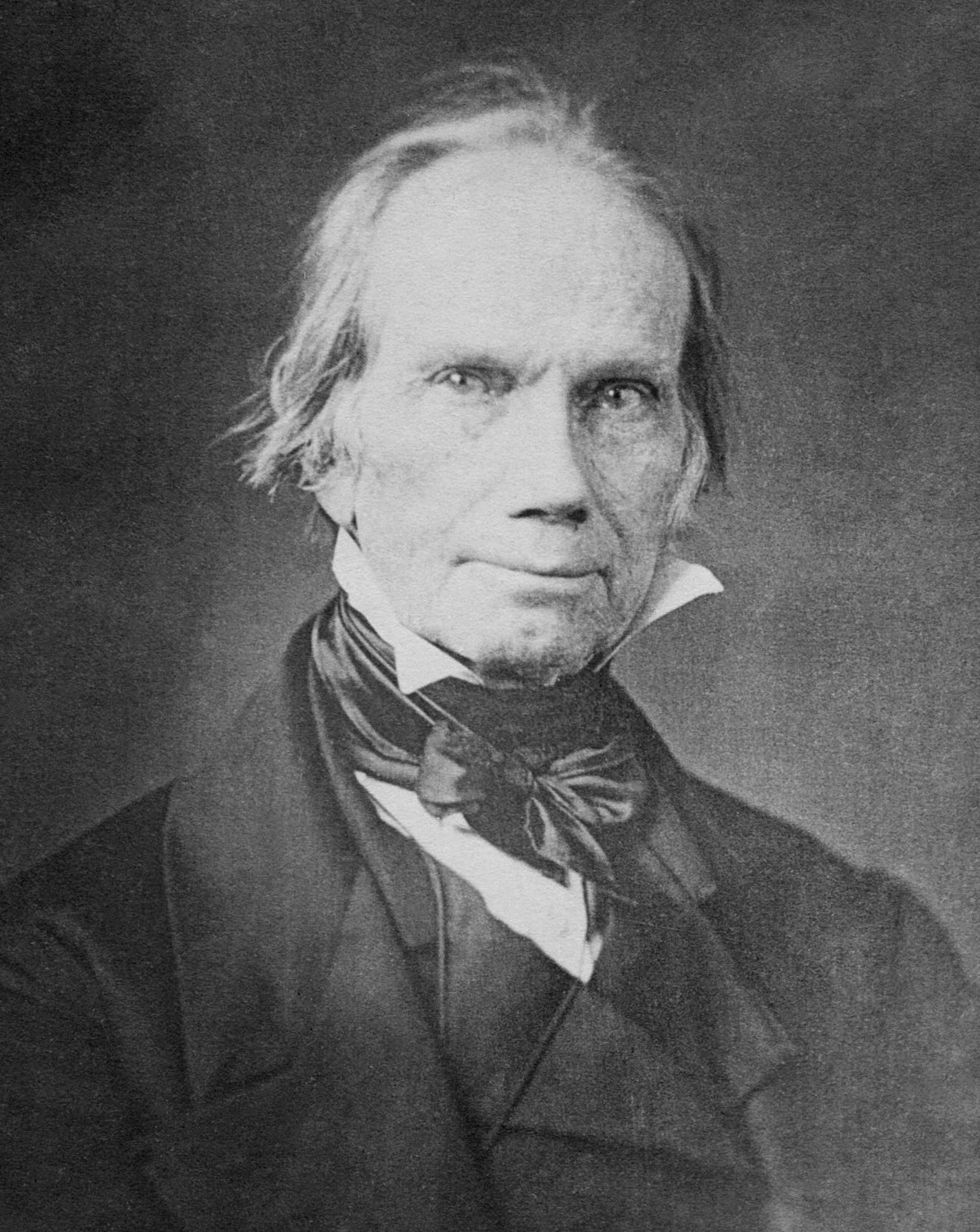
Nominee	James K. Polk	Henry Clay
Party	Democratic	Whig
Home state	Tennessee	Kentucky
Running mate	George M. Dallas	Theodore Frelinghuysen
Electoral vote	10	0
Popular vote	44,147	42,100
Percentage	51.19%	48.81%
County results
Polk
50–60%
60–70%
70–80%
80–90%
90–100%
Clay
50–60%
60–70%
70–80%
80–90%
90–100%
President before election
John Tyler
Independent
Elected President
James K. Polk
Democratic

A presidential election was held in Georgia on November 4, 1844 as part of the 1844 United States presidential election. Voters chose 10 representatives, or electors to the Electoral College, who voted for President and Vice President.

Georgia voted for the Democratic candidate, James K. Polk, over Whig candidate Henry Clay. Polk won Georgia by a margin of 2.38%.

== Results ==
1844 United States presidential election in Georgia
Party	Candidate	Running mate	Popular vote		Electoral vote	
Party	Candidate	Running mate	Count	%	Count	%
Democratic	James K. Polk of Tennessee	George M. Dallas of Pennsylvania	44,147	51.19%	10	100.00%
Whig	Henry Clay of Kentucky	Theodore Frelinghuysen of New York	42,100	48.81%	0	0.00%
Total			86,247	100.00%	10	100.00%

== See also ==
- United States presidential elections in Georgia
