= 1840 United States presidential election in Georgia =

- November 2, 1840
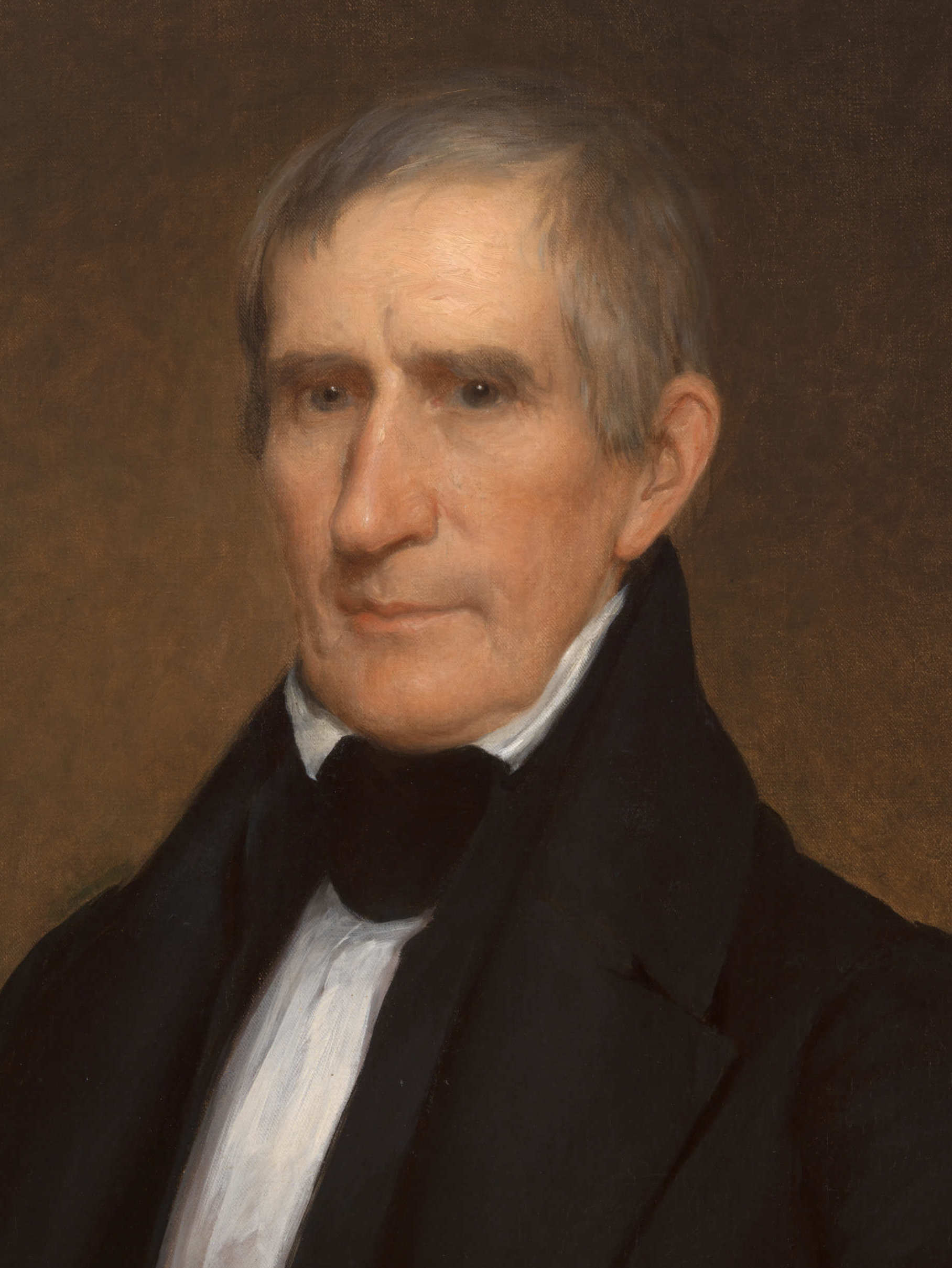

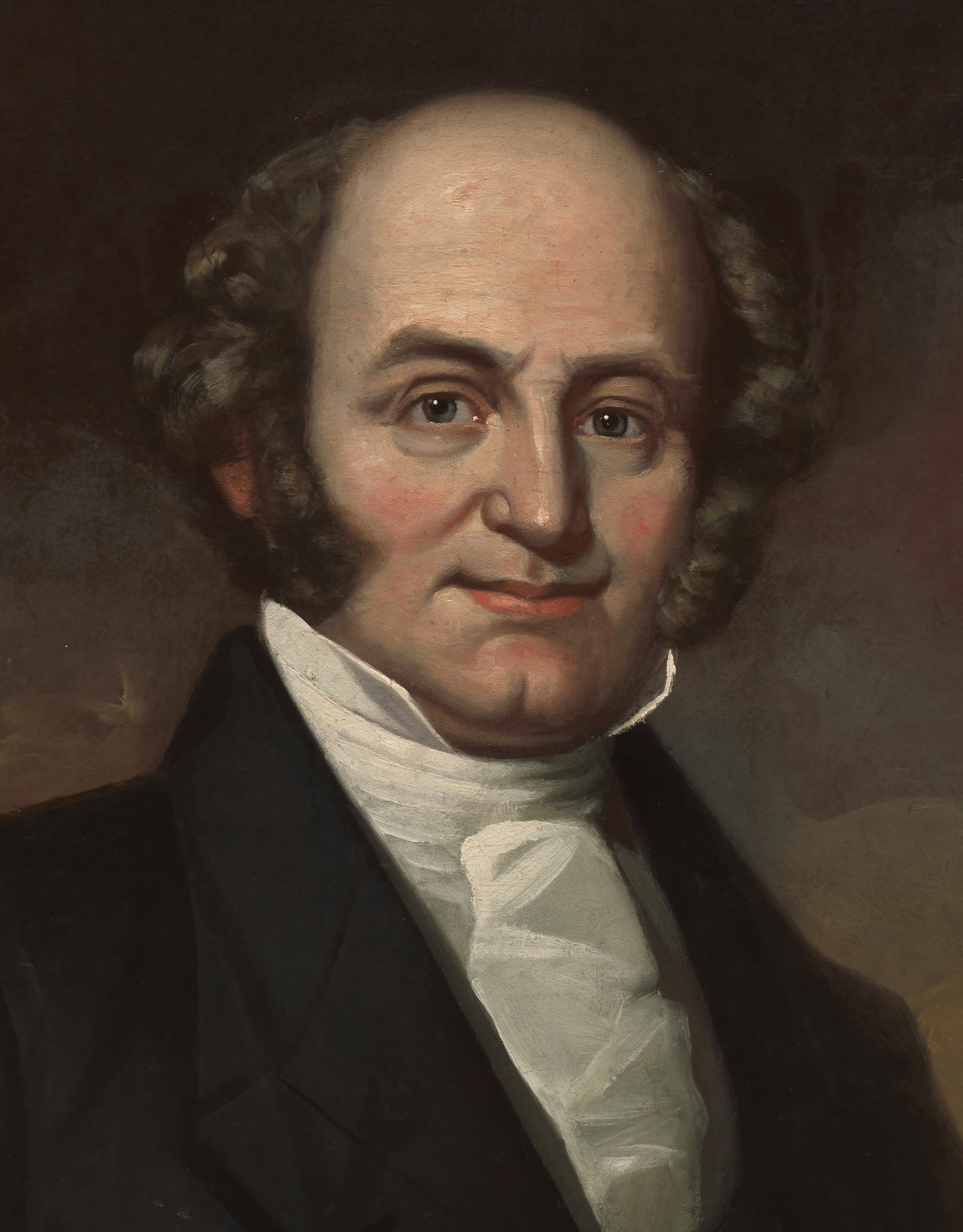
Nominee	William Henry Harrison	Martin Van Buren
Party	Whig	Democratic
Home state	Ohio	New York
Running mate	John Tyler	none
Electoral vote	11	0
Popular vote	40,339	31,983
Percentage	55.78%	44.22%
County results
Harrison
50–60%
60–70%
70–80%
80–90%
90–100%
Van Buren
50–60%
60–70%
70–80%
80–90%
90–100%
Tie
50%
President before election
Martin Van Buren
Democratic
Elected President
William Henry Harrison
Whig

A presidential election was held in Georgia on November 2, 1840 as part of the 1840 United States presidential election. Voters chose 11 representatives, or electors to the Electoral College, who voted for President and Vice President.

Georgia voted for the Whig candidate, William Henry Harrison, over Democratic candidate Martin Van Buren. Harrison won Georgia by a margin of 11.56%. This would be the last time that Georgia did not vote for the incumbent Democratic president until 1964.

== Results ==
1840 United States presidential election in Georgia
Party	Candidate	Running mate	Popular vote		Electoral vote	
Party	Candidate	Running mate	Count	%	Count	%
Whig	William Henry Harrison of Ohio	John Tyler of Virginia	40,339	55.78%	11	100.00%
Democratic	Martin Van Buren of New York	Richard Mentor Johnson of Kentucky	31,983	44.22%	0	0.00%
Total			72,322	100.00%	11	100.00%

== See also ==
- United States presidential elections in Georgia
