= 1876 United States presidential election in Georgia =

- November 7, 1876
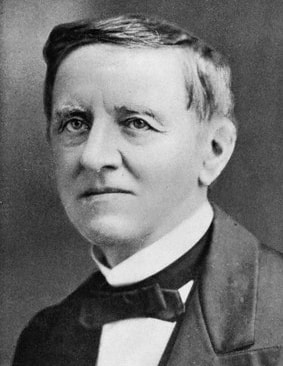

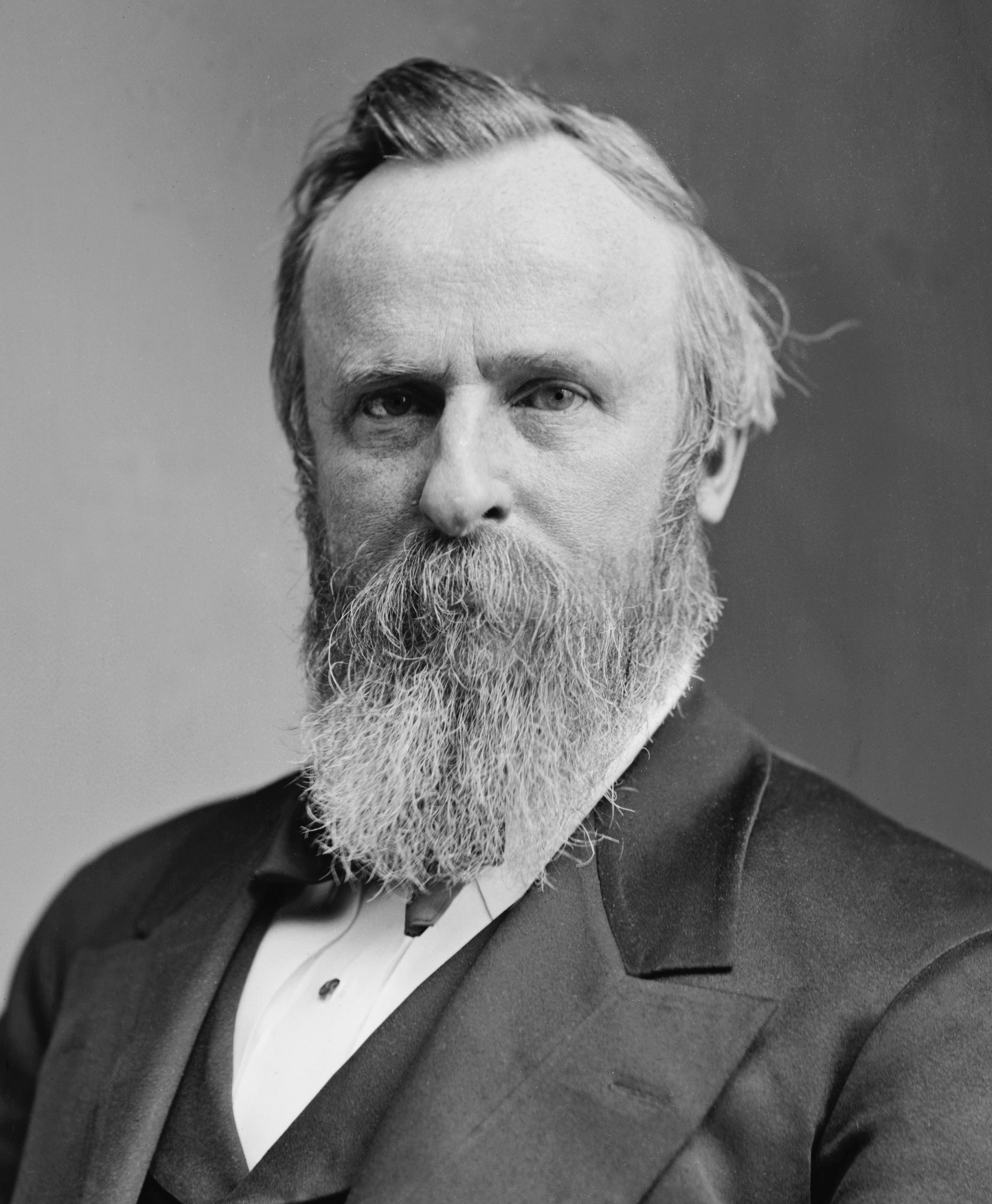
Nominee	Samuel J. Tilden	Rutherford B. Hayes
Party	Democratic	Republican
Home state	New York	Ohio
Running mate	Thomas Hendricks	William A. Wheeler
Electoral vote	11	0
Popular vote	130,157	50,533
Percentage	72.03%	27.97%
County results
Tilden
50–60%
60–70%
70–80%
80–90%
90–100%
Hayes
50–60%
60–70%
President before election
Ulysses S. Grant
Republican
Elected President
Rutherford B. Hayes
Republican

The 1876 United States presidential election in Georgia took place on November 7, 1876, as part of the wider United States presidential election. Voters chose 11 representatives, or electors, to the electoral college, who voted for president and vice president.

Reconstruction in Georgia ended in 1871. The Tilden/Hendricks ticket carried the state by a margin of 44.06% on election day.

== Results ==
1876 United States presidential election in Georgia
Party	Candidate	Votes	Percentage	Electoral votes
Democratic	Samuel J. Tilden	130,157	72.03%	11
Republican	Rutherford B. Hayes	50,533	27.97%	0

== See also ==
- United States presidential elections in Georgia
