= 1868 United States presidential election in Georgia =

- November 3, 1868
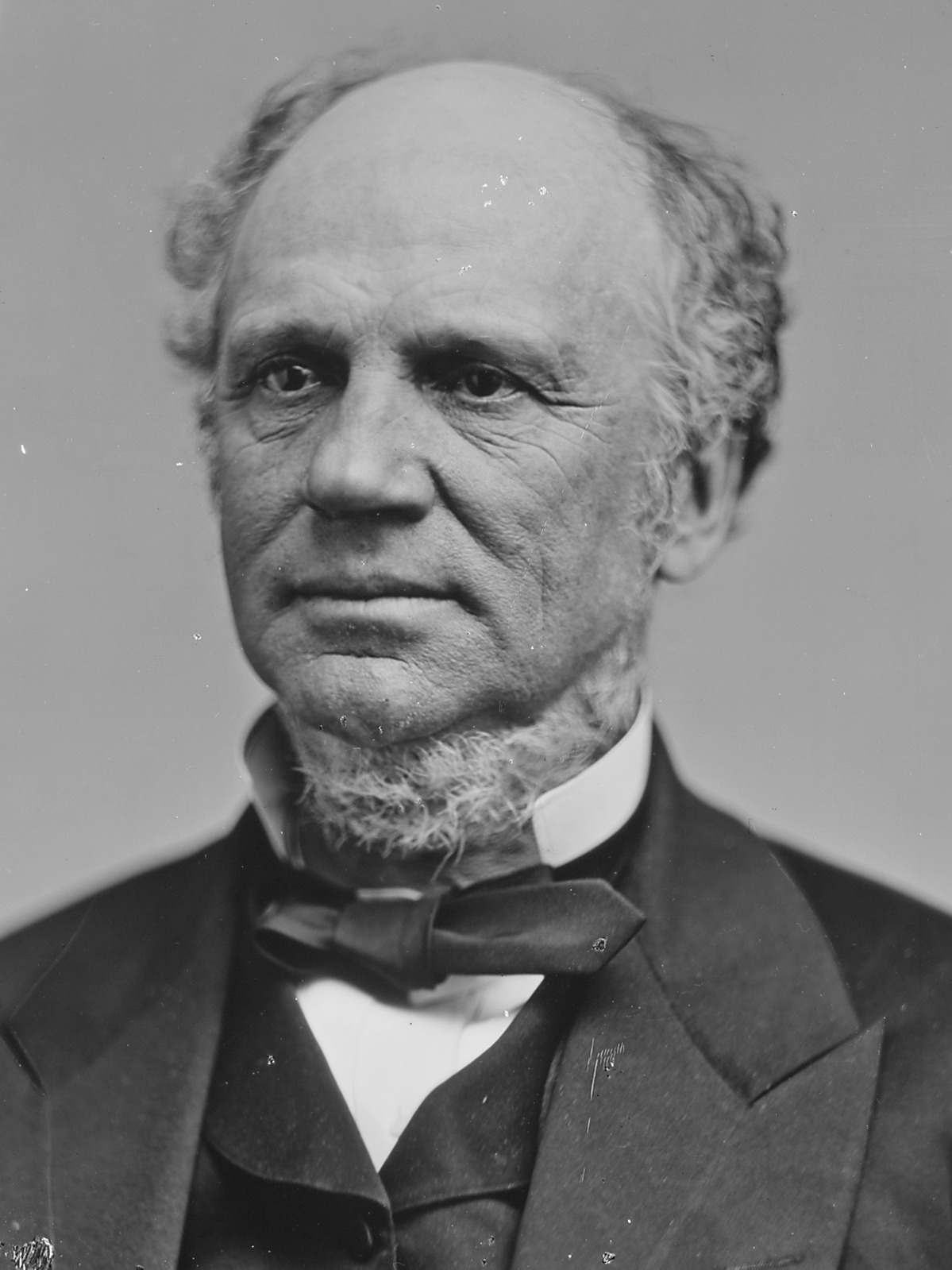

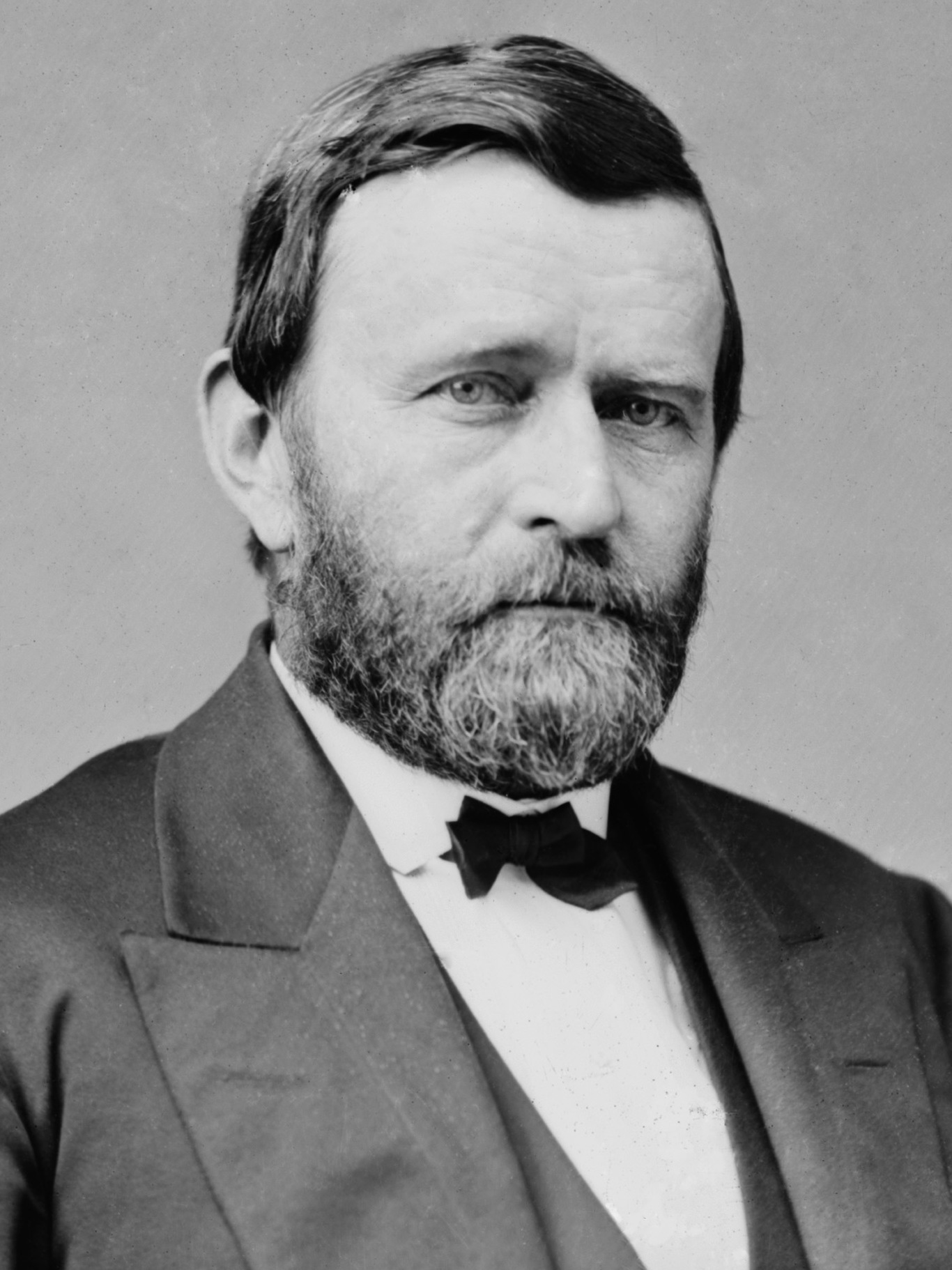
| Nominee | Horatio Seymour | Ulysses S. Grant |
| Party | Democratic | Republican |
| Home state | New York | Illinois |
| Running mate | Francis Preston Blair Jr. | Schuyler Colfax |
| Electoral vote | 9 | 0 |
| Popular vote | 102,707 | 57,109 |
| Percentage | 64.27% | 35.73% |
County results
Seymour
50–60%
60–70%
70–80%
80–90%
90–100%
Grant
50–60%
60–70%
70–80%
80–90%
President before election
Andrew Johnson
National Union
Elected President
Ulysses S. Grant
Republican

The 1868 United States presidential election in Georgia took place on November 3, 1868, as part of the wider United States presidential election. Voters chose nine representatives, or electors, to the Electoral College, who voted for president and vice president.

The first readmission of Georgia to the Union occurred in 1868. The election in Georgia, as in much of the former Confederacy, was marred by considerable violence against the state's African American voters by the Ku Klux Klan. Although at the time normally relegated to majority white areas, the Klan's violence in Georgia spread to the black belt, making it impossible for black voters in some counties to vote. As a result, eleven majority-black counties recorded zero votes for the Republican ticket. Aided by this, Democratic candidate Horatio Seymour and his running mate Francis Preston Blair Jr. won the state, one of their only two victories in the former Confederacy. With 64.27% of the popular vote, Georgia would be Seymour's fourth strongest victory in terms of percentage in the popular vote after Kentucky, Louisiana and Maryland.

== Results ==
1868 United States presidential election in Georgia
| Party | Candidate | Votes | Percentage | Electoral votes |
|---|---|---|---|---|
| Democratic | Horatio Seymour | 102,707 | 64.27% | 9 |
| Republican | Ulysses S. Grant | 57,109 | 35.73% | 0 |

== See also ==
- United States presidential elections in Georgia
