= 1856 United States presidential election in Georgia =

- November 4, 1856
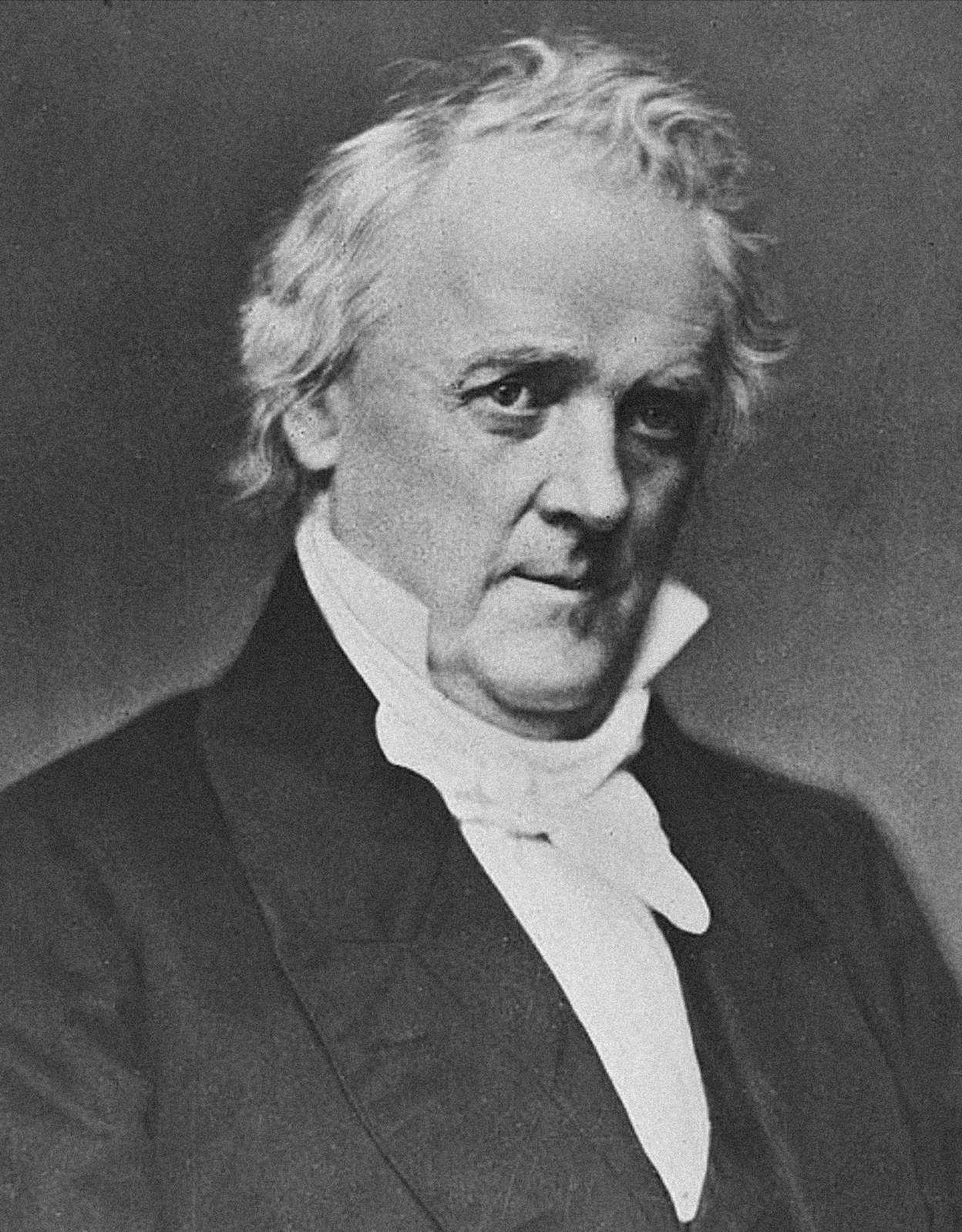

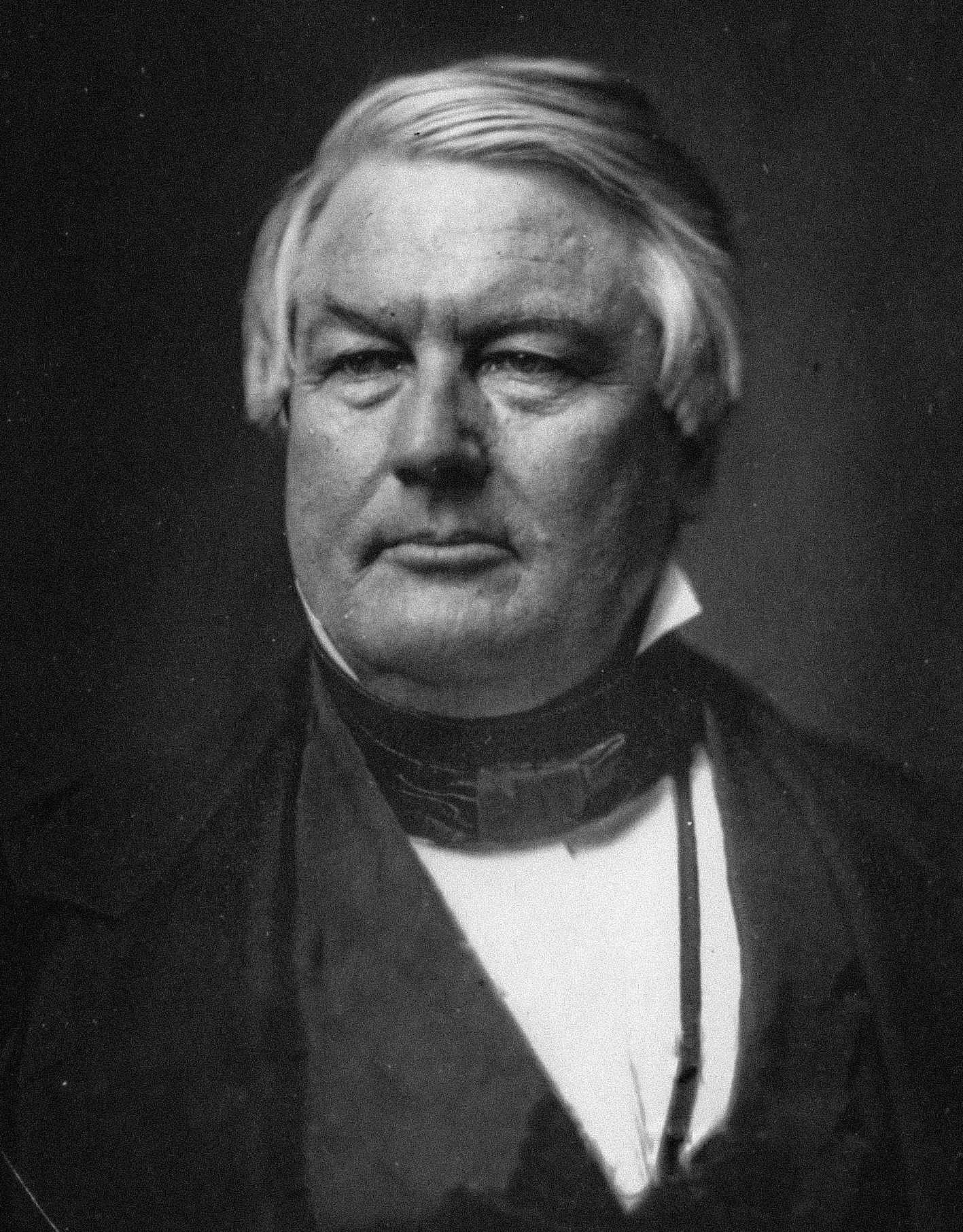
Nominee	James Buchanan	Millard Fillmore
Party	Democratic	Know Nothing
Home state	Pennsylvania	New York
Running mate	John C. Breckinridge	Andrew Jackson Donelson
Electoral vote	10	0
Popular vote	56,581	42,439
Percentage	57.14%	42.86%
County results
Buchanan
50–60%
60–70%
70–80%
80–90%
90–100%
Fillmore
50–60%
60–70%
70–80%
80–90%
Tie
President before election
Franklin Pierce
Democratic
Elected President
James Buchanan
Democratic

The 1856 United States presidential election in Georgia took place on November 4, 1856, as part of the 1856 United States presidential election. Voters chose 10 representatives, or electors to the Electoral College, who voted for president and vice president.

Georgia voted for the Democratic candidate, James Buchanan, over American Party candidate Millard Fillmore. Buchanan won Georgia by a margin of 14.28%.

Republican Party candidate John C. Frémont was not on the ballot in the state, despite being born in Savannah.

== Results ==
1856 United States presidential election in Georgia
Party	Candidate	Running mate	Popular vote		Electoral vote	
Party	Candidate	Running mate	Count	%	Count	%
Democratic	James Buchanan of Pennsylvania	John C. Breckinridge of Kentucky	56,581	57.14%	10	100.00%
Know Nothing	Millard Fillmore of New York	Andrew Jackson Donelson of Tennessee	42,439	42.86%	0	0.00%
Total			99,020	100.00%	10	100.00%

== See also ==
- United States presidential elections in Georgia
