= 1872 United States presidential election in Georgia =

- November 5, 1872

Nominee	Horace Greeley	Ulysses S. Grant
Party	Liberal Republican	Republican
Home state	New York	Illinois
Running mate	B. Gratz Brown	Henry Wilson
Electoral vote	0 (+3 rejected)	0
Popular vote	76,356	62,550
Percentage	54.97%	45.03%
County results
Greeley
50–60%
60–70%
70–80%
80–90%
90–100%
Grant
50–60%
60–70%
70–80%
80–90%
Tie
President before election
Ulysses S. Grant
Republican
Elected President
Ulysses S. Grant
Republican
- Electoral college vote
- December 4, 1872

11 members of the Electoral College from Georgia
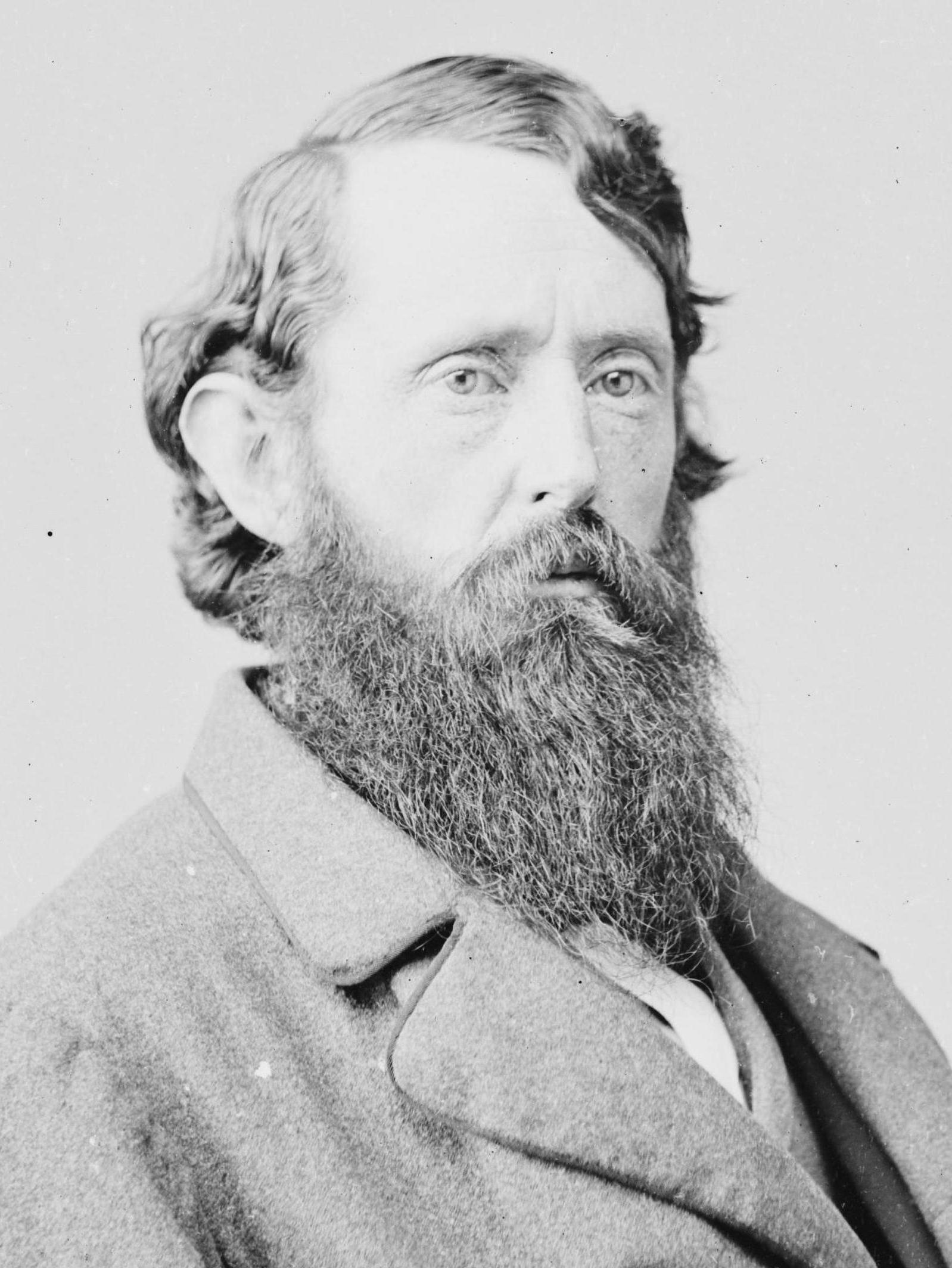

Candidate	B. Gratz Brown	Charles J. Jenkins
Party	Liberal Republican	Democratic
Home state	Missouri	Georgia
Electoral vote	6	2

The 1872 United States presidential election in Georgia took place on November 5, 1872, as part of the 1872 United States presidential election. Voters chose 11 representatives, or electors to the Electoral College, who voted for president and vice president.

Georgia voted for the Liberal Republican candidate, Horace Greeley, over Republican candidate, Ulysses S. Grant. Greeley won Georgia by a margin of 9.94%. However, Greeley died prior to the Electoral College meeting, allowing Georgia's 11 electors to vote for the candidate of their choice: 6 voted for Greeley's running mate, B. Gratz Brown, and 2 for Charles J. Jenkins. 3 electors attempted to vote for the deceased Greeley, but their votes were rejected after a House of Representatives resolution.

Georgia was one of only two former Confederate states (along with Texas) that didn't vote Republican during the reconstruction elections of 1868, 1872, and 1876. During these elections, Southern Republicans were briefly empowered by newly registered black voters who would soon become disenfranchised again by anti-black laws known as black codes or Jim Crow laws in the late 1870s and 1880s. Despite failing to carry the state, Grant's 45.03% of the vote stood as the best performance by a Republican in Georgia until Barry Goldwater finally carried the state in 1964, 92 years later.

This was the last time the Republican candidate carried Fulton County, home to Atlanta, and Clayton County until 1928; the last time they carried Bryan, Charlton, Lowndes, Harris, Houston, Putnam, Pike, and Fayette counties until 1964, and the last time they won Coweta, Meriwether, Butts, Newton, and Clarke counties until 1972, when Richard Nixon swept every county in the state.

== Results ==
1872 United States presidential election in Georgia
Party	Candidate	Running mate	Popular vote		Electoral vote	
Party	Candidate	Running mate	Count	%	Count	%
Liberal Republican	Benjamin G. Brown of Missouri	N/A of	–	–	6	54.55%
Democratic	Charles Jones Jenkins of Georgia	N/A of	–	–	2	18.18%
Liberal Republican	Horace Greeley of New York	Benjamin Gratz Brown of Missouri	76,356	54.97%	0 (+3 rejected) (Note: Greeley died after the election, but prior to the Electoral College meeting, and was thus ineligible for the office of President. Greeley had won 11 pledged electors, of which 8 cast their votes for other Democrats. 3 electors voted for Greeley; however, their votes were rejected.)	0.00%
Republican	Ulysses S. Grant of Illinois	Henry Wilson of Massachusetts	62,550	45.03%	0	0.00%
Total			138,906	100.00%	8	100.00%

== See also ==
- United States presidential elections in Georgia
