= 1880 United States presidential election in Georgia =

- November 2, 1880
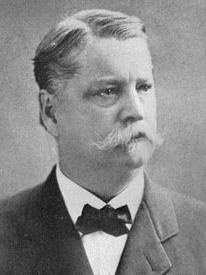

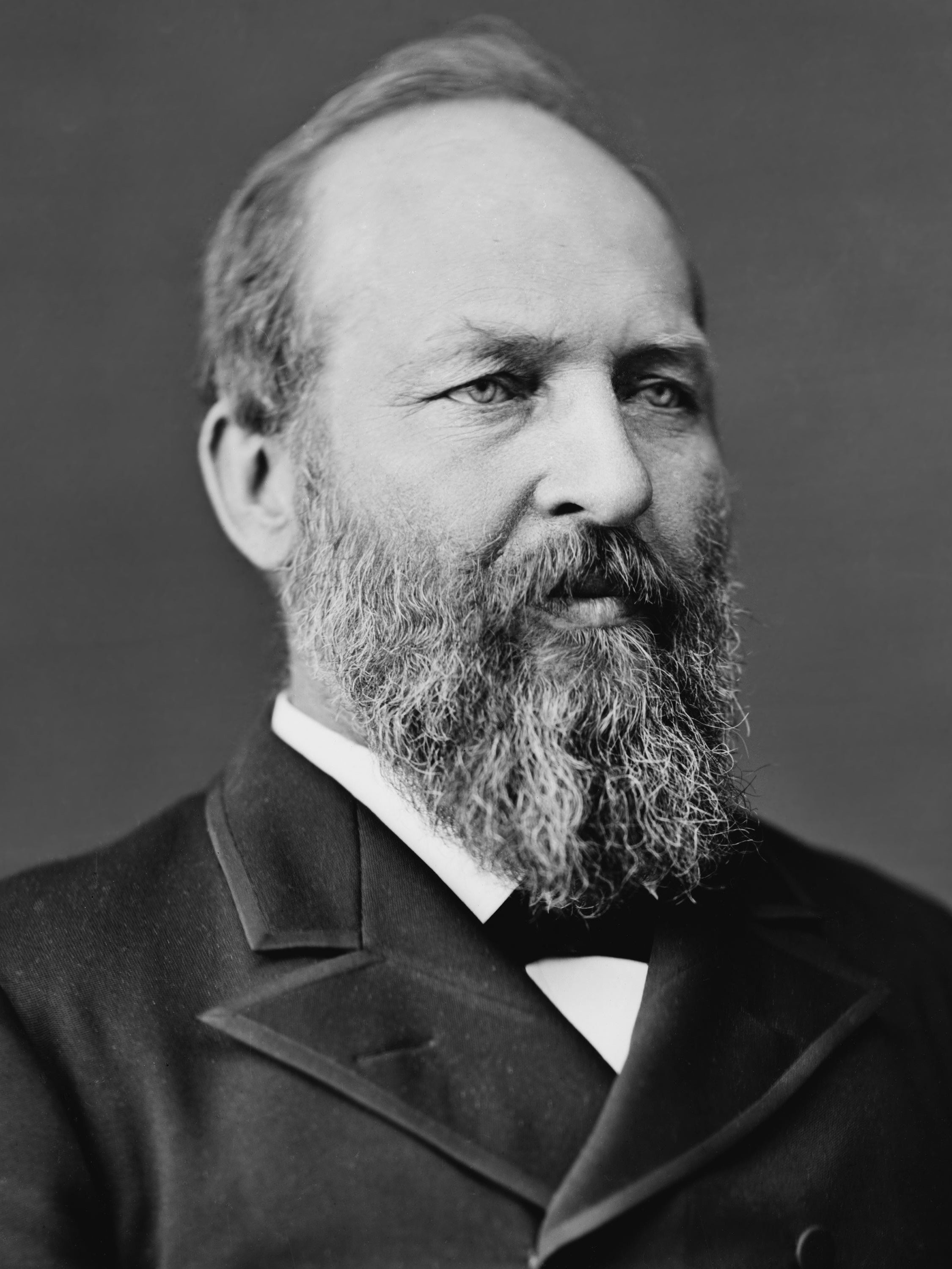
Nominee	Winfield Scott Hancock	James Garfield
Party	Democratic	Republican
Home state	Pennsylvania	Ohio
Running mate	William Hayden English	Chester A. Arthur
Electoral vote	11	0
Popular vote	102,981	54,470
Percentage	65.41%	34.59%
County results
Hancock
50–60%
60–70%
70–80%
80–90%
90–100%
Garfield
50–60%
60–70%
70–80%
President before election
Rutherford B. Hayes
Republican
Elected President
James Garfield
Republican

The 1880 United States presidential election in Georgia took place on November 2, 1880, as part of the wider United States presidential election. Voters chose 11 representatives, or electors, to the Electoral College, who voted for president and vice president.

Following Reconstruction, Georgia would be the first former Confederate state to substantially disenfranchise its newly enfranchised freedmen and many poor whites, doing so in the early 1870s. This largely limited the Republican Party to a few North Georgia counties with substantial Civil War Unionist sentiment – chiefly Fannin but also to a lesser extent Pickens, Gilmer and Towns – and in presidential elections to a small number of counties elsewhere where blacks were not fully disenfranchised. The Democratic Party served as the guardian of white supremacy against a Republican Party historically associated with memories of Reconstruction, and the main competition became Democratic primaries, which were restricted to whites on the grounds of the Democratic Party being legally a private club. This restriction was done by local county laws, but combined with the highly efficacious cumulative poll tax introduced in 1877 meant that turnout would begin a decline to be consistently lower than any other former Confederate state except South Carolina.

Despite the failure of outgoing President Rutherford B. Hayes to convert any of the formerly Whig landowners to the GOP, Democratic nominee Winfield Scott Hancock declined by seven percent upon Samuel J. Tilden’s performance in Georgia from 1876, as mountain country whites who could pay the poll tax were nonetheless dissatisfied with the spending cuts of the “Redeemers” and their economic problems from deflation and a regressive and malapportioned tax system.

== Results ==
1880 United States presidential election in Georgia
Party	Candidate	Votes	Percentage	Electoral votes
Democratic	Winfield Scott Hancock	102,981	65.41%	11
Republican	James A. Garfield	54,470	34.59%	0

=== Results by county ===
County	Winfield Scott Hancock Democratic		James Abram Garfield Republican		Margin		Total votes cast
County	#	%	#	%	#	%	Total votes cast
Appling	295	70.74%	122	29.26%	173	41.49%	417
Baker	534	61.03%	341	38.97%	193	22.06%	875
Baldwin	860	73.07%	317	26.93%	543	46.13%	1,177
Banks	645	84.31%	120	15.69%	525	68.63%	765
Bartow	1,917	69.86%	827	30.14%	1,090	39.72%	2,744
Berrien	845	94.84%	46	5.16%	799	89.67%	891
Bibb	1,588	63.62%	908	36.38%	680	27.24%	2,496
Brooks	984	57.11%	739	42.89%	245	14.22%	1,723
Bryan	223	64.83%	121	35.17%	102	29.65%	344
Bulloch	992	98.51%	15	1.49%	977	97.02%	1,007
Burke	983	31.74%	2,114	68.26%	-1,131	-36.52%	3,097
Butts	672	62.51%	403	37.49%	269	25.02%	1,075
Calhoun	378	48.71%	398	51.29%	-20	-2.58%	776
Camden	331	34.27%	635	65.73%	-304	-31.47%	966
Campbell	576	62.47%	346	37.53%	230	24.95%	922
Carroll	1,240	79.03%	329	20.97%	911	58.06%	1,569
Catoosa	488	88.25%	65	11.75%	423	76.49%	553
Charlton	141	75.40%	46	24.60%	95	50.80%	187
Chatham	3,404	61.18%	2,160	38.82%	1,244	22.36%	5,564
Chattahoochee	323	51.11%	309	48.89%	14	2.22%	632
Chattooga	1,166	84.99%	206	15.01%	960	69.97%	1,372
Cherokee	1,813	93.55%	125	6.45%	1,688	87.10%	1,938
Clarke	800	51.12%	765	48.88%	35	2.24%	1,565
Clay	515	57.48%	381	42.52%	134	14.96%	896
Clayton	382	72.08%	148	27.92%	234	44.15%	530
Clinch	368	79.83%	93	20.17%	275	59.65%	461
Cobb	1,980	77.98%	559	22.02%	1,421	55.97%	2,539
Coffee	235	100.00%	0	0.00%	235	100.00%	235
Colquitt	177	80.45%	43	19.55%	134	60.91%	220
Columbia	244	100.00%	0	0.00%	244	100.00%	244
Coweta	1,381	51.80%	1,285	48.20%	96	3.60%	2,666
Crawford	368	67.77%	175	32.23%	193	35.54%	543
Dade	459	84.69%	83	15.31%	376	69.37%	542
Dawson	420	76.64%	128	23.36%	292	53.28%	548
De Kalb	876	72.64%	330	27.36%	546	45.27%	1,206
Decatur	1,099	52.23%	1,005	47.77%	94	4.47%	2,104
Dodge	363	84.81%	65	15.19%	298	69.63%	428
Dooly	835	77.03%	249	22.97%	586	54.06%	1,084
Dougherty	367	26.25%	1,031	73.75%	-664	-47.50%	1,398
Douglas	482	79.54%	124	20.46%	358	59.08%	606
Early	737	74.75%	249	25.25%	488	49.49%	986
Echols	185	82.22%	40	17.78%	145	64.44%	225
Effingham	365	63.92%	206	36.08%	159	27.85%	571
Elbert	827	96.73%	28	3.27%	799	93.45%	855
Emanuel	769	81.29%	177	18.71%	592	62.58%	946
Fannin	343	53.18%	302	46.82%	41	6.36%	645
Fayette	499	73.17%	183	26.83%	316	46.33%	682
Floyd	2,251	71.62%	892	28.38%	1,359	43.24%	3,143
Forsyth	1,159	90.62%	120	9.38%	1,039	81.24%	1,279
Franklin	1,173	88.60%	151	11.40%	1,022	77.19%	1,324
Fulton	3,045	57.74%	2,229	42.26%	816	15.47%	5,274
Gilmer	494	68.71%	225	31.29%	269	37.41%	719
Glascock	212	96.36%	8	3.64%	204	92.73%	220
Glynn	292	44.24%	368	55.76%	-76	-11.52%	660
Gordon	1,248	88.45%	163	11.55%	1,085	76.90%	1,411
Greene	755	78.89%	202	21.11%	553	57.78%	957
Gwinnett	1,812	88.13%	244	11.87%	1,568	76.26%	2,056
Habersham	1,121	94.92%	60	5.08%	1,061	89.84%	1,181
Hall	1,745	86.64%	269	13.36%	1,476	73.29%	2,014
Hancock	583	60.35%	383	39.65%	200	20.70%	966
Haralson	1,121	94.92%	60	5.08%	1,061	89.84%	1,181
Harris	1,036	53.71%	893	46.29%	143	7.41%	1,929
Hart	460	73.72%	164	26.28%	296	47.44%	624
Heard	617	70.03%	264	29.97%	353	40.07%	881
Henry	691	57.73%	506	42.27%	185	15.46%	1,197
Houston	1,382	60.32%	909	39.68%	473	20.65%	2,291
Irwin	235	100.00%	0	0.00%	235	100.00%	235
Jackson	1,271	74.24%	441	25.76%	830	48.48%	1,712
Jasper	524	66.25%	267	33.75%	257	32.49%	791
Jefferson	625	66.99%	308	33.01%	317	33.98%	933
Johnson	259	98.48%	4	1.52%	255	96.96%	263
Jones	504	49.22%	520	50.78%	-16	-1.56%	1,024
Laurens	524	77.17%	155	22.83%	369	54.34%	679
Lee	213	22.95%	715	77.05%	-502	-54.09%	928
Liberty	419	36.79%	720	63.21%	-301	-26.43%	1,139
Lincoln	275	100.00%	0	0.00%	275	100.00%	275
Lowndes	746	53.06%	660	46.94%	86	6.12%	1,406
Lumpkin	568	89.87%	64	10.13%	504	79.75%	632
Macon	703	48.45%	748	51.55%	-45	-3.10%	1,451
Madison	592	85.06%	104	14.94%	488	70.11%	696
Marion	467	66.43%	236	33.57%	231	32.86%	703
McDuffie	351	85.40%	60	14.60%	291	70.80%	411
McIntosh	184	22.97%	617	77.03%	-433	-54.06%	801
Meriwether	1,028	53.65%	888	46.35%	140	7.31%	1,916
Miller	241	93.05%	18	6.95%	223	86.10%	259
Milton	460	90.91%	46	9.09%	414	81.82%	506
Mitchell	607	46.48%	699	53.52%	-92	-7.04%	1,306
Monroe	1,312	56.19%	1,023	43.81%	289	12.38%	2,335
Montgomery	246	77.36%	72	22.64%	174	54.72%	318
Morgan	828	42.83%	1,105	57.17%	-277	-14.33%	1,933
Murray	933	90.76%	95	9.24%	838	81.52%	1,028
Muscogee	1,511	61.90%	930	38.10%	581	23.80%	2,441
Newton	743	56.12%	581	43.88%	162	12.24%	1,324
Oconee	458	58.20%	329	41.80%	129	16.39%	787
Oglethorpe	637	80.13%	158	19.87%	479	60.25%	795
Paulding	952	78.68%	258	21.32%	694	57.36%	1,210
Pickens	326	50.54%	319	49.46%	7	1.09%	645
Pierce	275	58.51%	195	41.49%	80	17.02%	470
Pike	1,070	59.35%	733	40.65%	337	18.69%	1,803
Polk	1,066	67.73%	508	32.27%	558	35.45%	1,574
Pulaski	823	64.75%	448	35.25%	375	29.50%	1,271
Putnam	627	99.84%	1	0.16%	626	99.68%	628
Quitman	301	61.18%	191	38.82%	110	22.36%	492
Rabun	532	99.63%	2	0.37%	530	99.25%	534
Randolph	343	66.99%	169	33.01%	174	33.98%	512
Richmond	2,430	61.88%	1,497	38.12%	933	23.76%	3,927
Rockdale	464	65.63%	243	34.37%	221	31.26%	707
Schley	300	67.57%	144	32.43%	156	35.14%	444
Screven	1,131	78.05%	318	21.95%	813	56.11%	1,449
Spalding	742	46.29%	861	53.71%	-119	-7.42%	1,603
Stewart	640	83.33%	128	16.67%	512	66.67%	768
Sumter	986	45.80%	1,167	54.20%	-181	-8.41%	2,153
Talbot	719	50.21%	713	49.79%	6	0.42%	1,432
Taliaferro	355	47.65%	390	52.35%	-35	-4.70%	745
Tattnall	562	83.26%	113	16.74%	449	66.52%	675
Taylor	572	63.84%	324	36.16%	248	27.68%	896
Telfair	267	80.91%	63	19.09%	204	61.82%	330
Terrell	736	69.24%	327	30.76%	409	38.48%	1,063
Thomas	1,316	52.04%	1,213	47.96%	103	4.07%	2,529
Towns	254	58.80%	178	41.20%	76	17.59%	432
Troup	1,139	58.80%	798	41.20%	341	17.60%	1,937
Twiggs	196	35.13%	362	64.87%	-166	-29.75%	558
Union	664	93.39%	47	6.61%	617	86.78%	711
Upson	789	56.93%	597	43.07%	192	13.85%	1,386
Walker	1,194	77.79%	341	22.21%	853	55.57%	1,535
Walton	855	75.40%	279	24.60%	576	50.79%	1,134
Ware	353	63.72%	201	36.28%	152	27.44%	554
Warren	572	68.26%	266	31.74%	306	36.52%	838
Washington	1,071	53.28%	939	46.72%	132	6.57%	2,010
Wayne	353	74.32%	122	25.68%	231	48.63%	475
Webster	301	64.73%	164	35.27%	137	29.46%	465
White	644	92.00%	56	8.00%	588	84.00%	700
Whitfield	907	84.06%	172	15.94%	735	68.12%	1,079
Wilcox	294	94.84%	16	5.16%	278	89.68%	310
Wilkes	727	79.02%	193	20.98%	534	58.04%	920
Wilkinson	557	88.55%	72	11.45%	485	77.11%	629
Worth	491	78.81%	132	21.19%	359	57.62%	623
Totals	103,031	65.92%	53,274	34.08%	49,757	31.83%	156,305

== See also ==
- United States presidential elections in Georgia
