= 1848 United States presidential election in Georgia =

- November 7, 1848
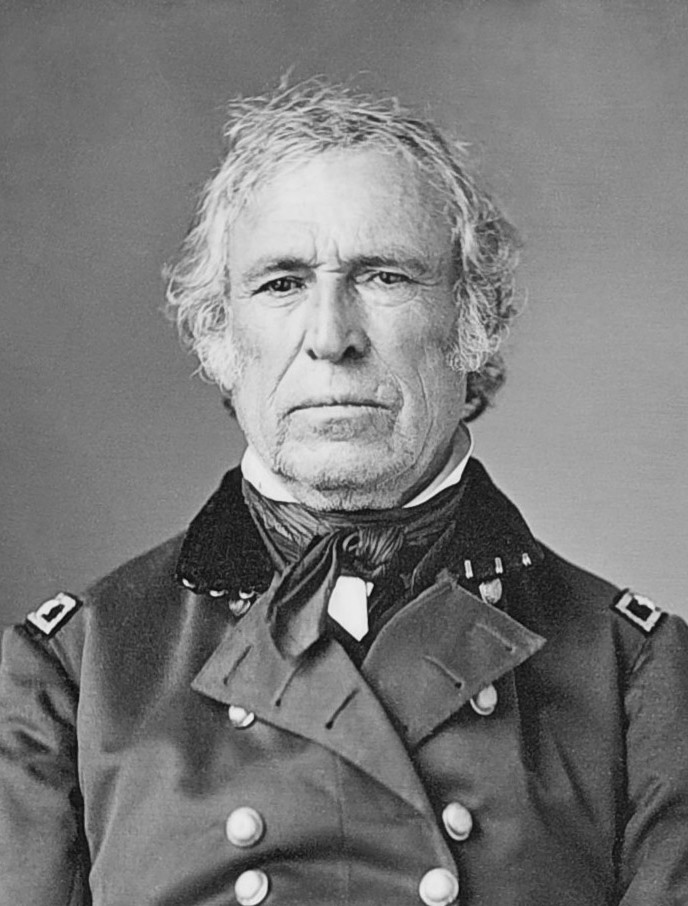

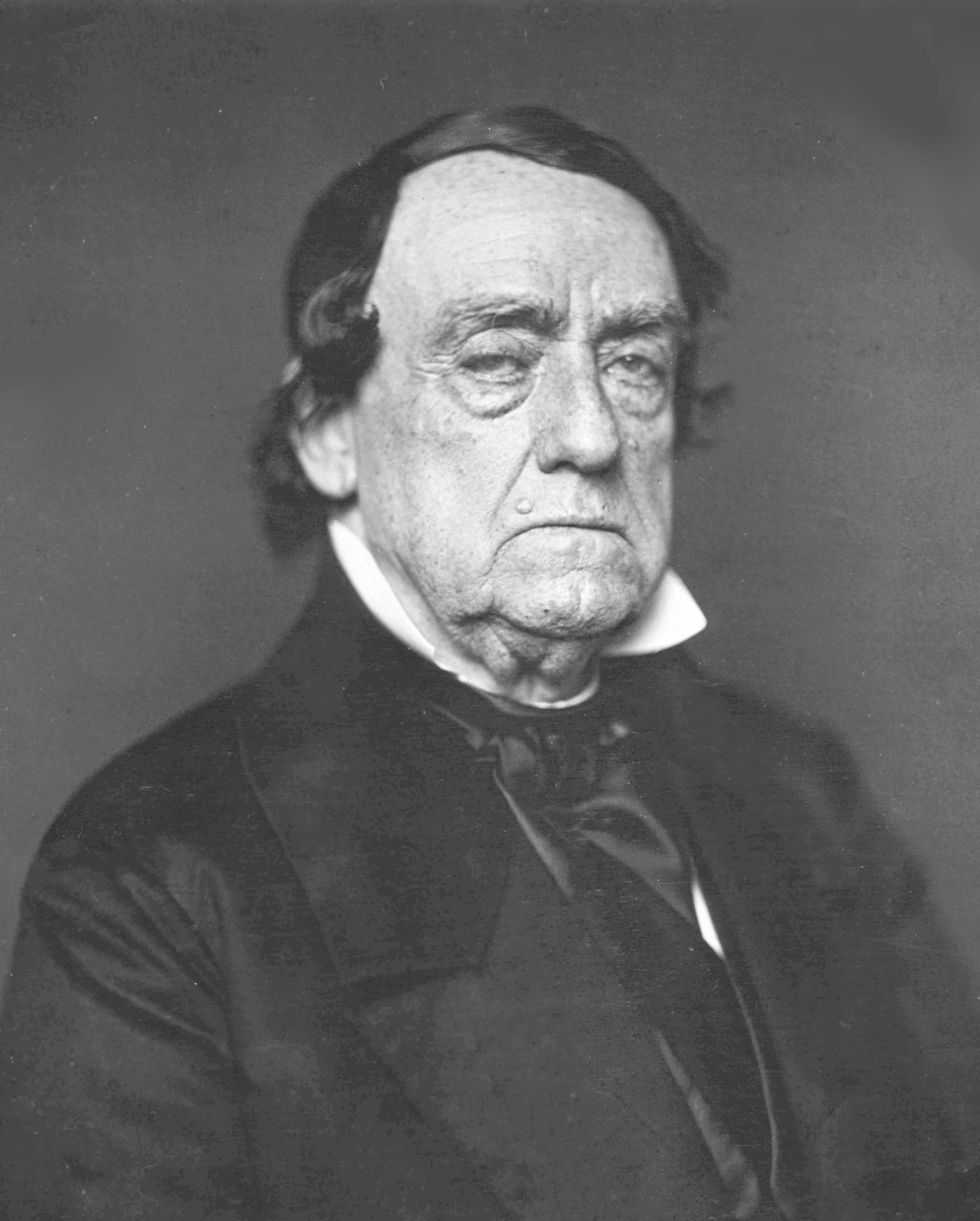
Nominee	Zachary Taylor	Lewis Cass
Party	Whig	Democratic
Home state	Louisiana	Michigan
Running mate	Millard Fillmore	William O. Butler
Electoral vote	10	0
Popular vote	47,532	44,785
Percentage	51.49%	48.51%
County results
Taylor
50–60%
60–70%
70–80%
80–90%
90–100%
Cass
50–60%
60–70%
70–80%
80–90%
President before election
James K. Polk
Democratic
Elected President
Zachary Taylor
Whig

The 1848 United States presidential election in Georgia took place on November 7, 1848, as part of the 1848 United States presidential election. Voters chose 10 representatives, or electors to the Electoral College, who voted for President and Vice President.

Georgia voted for the Whig candidate, Zachary Taylor, over Democratic candidate Lewis Cass. Taylor won Georgia by a narrow margin of 2.98%.

== Results ==
1848 United States presidential election in Georgia
Party	Candidate	Running mate	Popular vote		Electoral vote	
Party	Candidate	Running mate	Count	%	Count	%
Whig	Zachary Taylor of Louisiana	Millard Fillmore of New York	47,532	51.49%	10	100.00%
Democratic	Lewis Cass of Michigan	William O. Butler of Kentucky	44,785	48.51%	0	0.00%
Total			92,317	100.00%	10	100.00%
