= Griffin-Spalding County School District =

School district in Georgia (U.S. state)

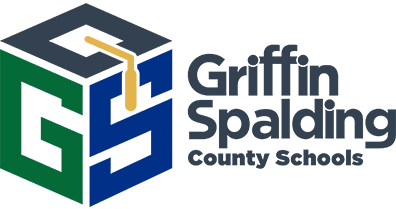

Address
- 216 South 6th Street Griffin, Georgia, 30224-3420; United States
- Coordinates: 33.248224°N 84.262146°W

District information
- Superintendent: Keith Simmons
- Accreditations: Southern Association of Colleges and Schools; Georgia Accrediting Commission
- NCES District ID: 1302520

Students and staff
- Enrollment: 9,563 (2022–23)
- Faculty: 660.80
- Staff: 770.20
- Student–teacher ratio: 14.47

Other information
- Website: gscs.org

The Griffin-Spalding County School District is a public school district in Spalding County, Georgia, United States, based in Griffin. It serves the communities of East Griffin, Experiment, Griffin, Orchard Hill, and Sunny Side.

== Schools ==
The Griffin-Spalding County School District has eleven elementary schools, four middle schools, and three high schools.

=== Elementary schools ===
- Anne Street Elementary School
- Atkinson Elementary School
- Beaverbrook Elementary School
- Cowan Road Elementary School
- Crescent Road Elementary School
- Futral Road Elementary School
- Jackson Road Elementary School
- Jordan Hill Road Elementary School
- Moore Elementary School
- Moreland Road Elementary School
- Orrs Elementary School

=== Middle schools ===
- Carver Road Middle School
- Cowan Road Middle School
- Kennedy Road Middle School
- Rehoboth Road Middle School

=== High schools ===
- AZ Kelsey Academy
- Griffin High School
- Spalding High School
