= Alapaha =

Alapaha may refer to:

- Alapaha, Georgia
- Alapaha River
- Alapaha Rise, a 1st magnitude spring in Hamilton County, Florida
- Lakeland, Georgia was named Alapaha from 1838 to 1857.
