= Berrien County Courthouse (Georgia) =

Historic courthouse in Georgia, US

- U.S. National Register of Historic Places
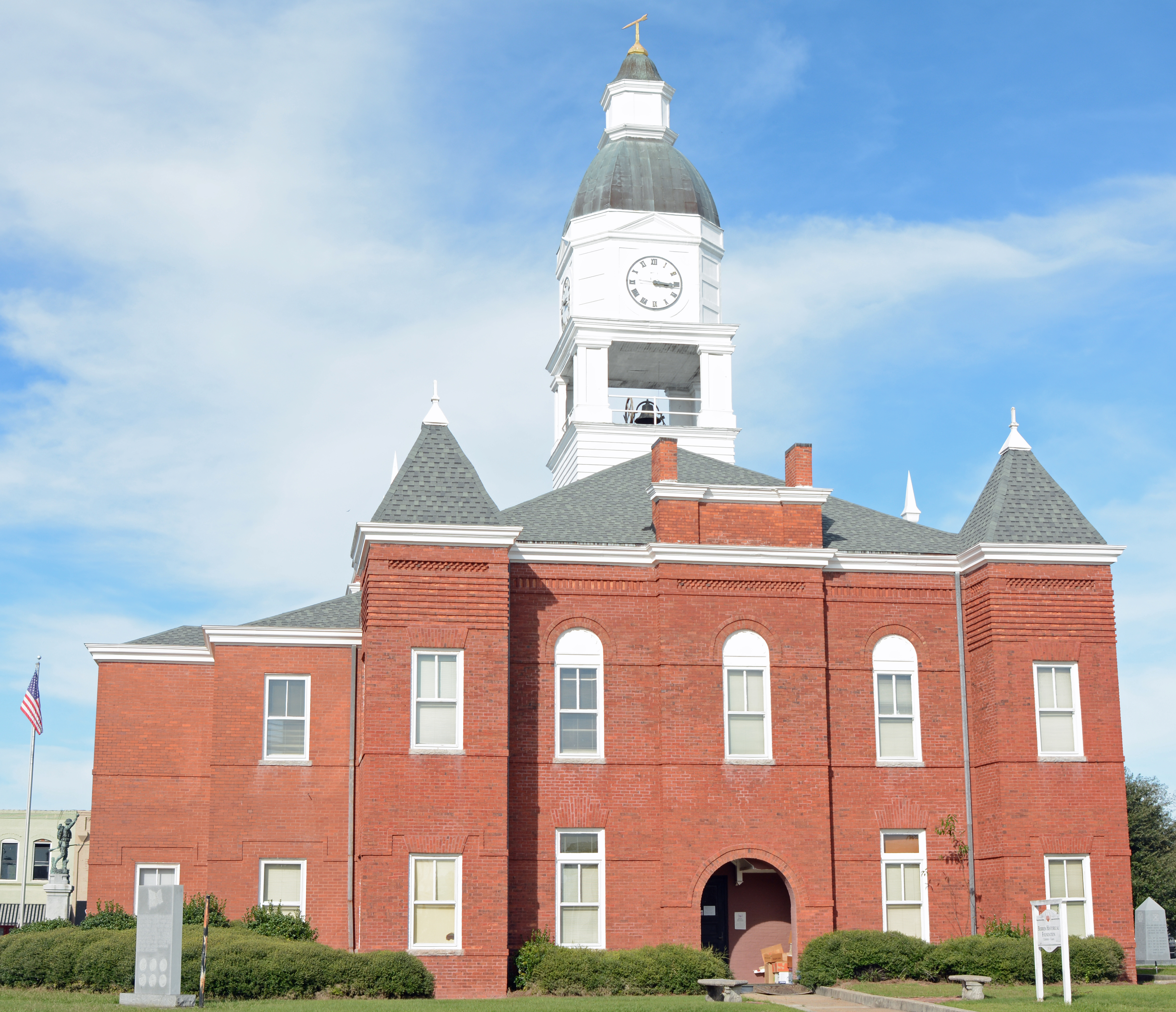
- Courthouse in 2015

- Location within Georgia Location within the United States
- Interactive map showing the location of Berrien County Courthouse
- Location: Town Square, Nashville, Georgia
- Coordinates: 31.20674°N 83.24976°W
- Area: 1 acre (0.40 ha)
- Built: 1898
- Architect: W Chamberlain Company
- NRHP reference No.: 77000409
- Added to NRHP: December 9, 1977

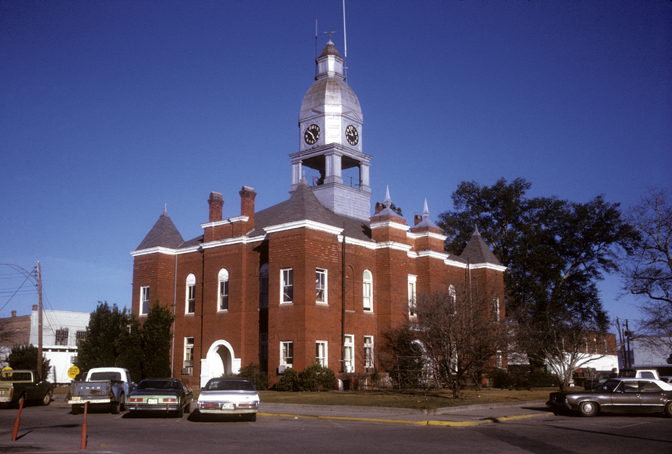
1974 photo by Calvin Beale

Berrien County Courthouse is the historic courthouse for Berrien County, Georgia. It is located in the Town Square of Nashville.

The first Berrien County Courthouse was a two-story log building built on this site in 1858. The present structure dates from 1898. It was added to the National Register of Historic Places on December 9, 1977.

== See also ==
- Berrien County Jail
- National Register of Historic Places listings in Berrien County, Georgia
