= Old Berrien County Jail =

- Berrien County Jail
- U.S. National Register of Historic Places
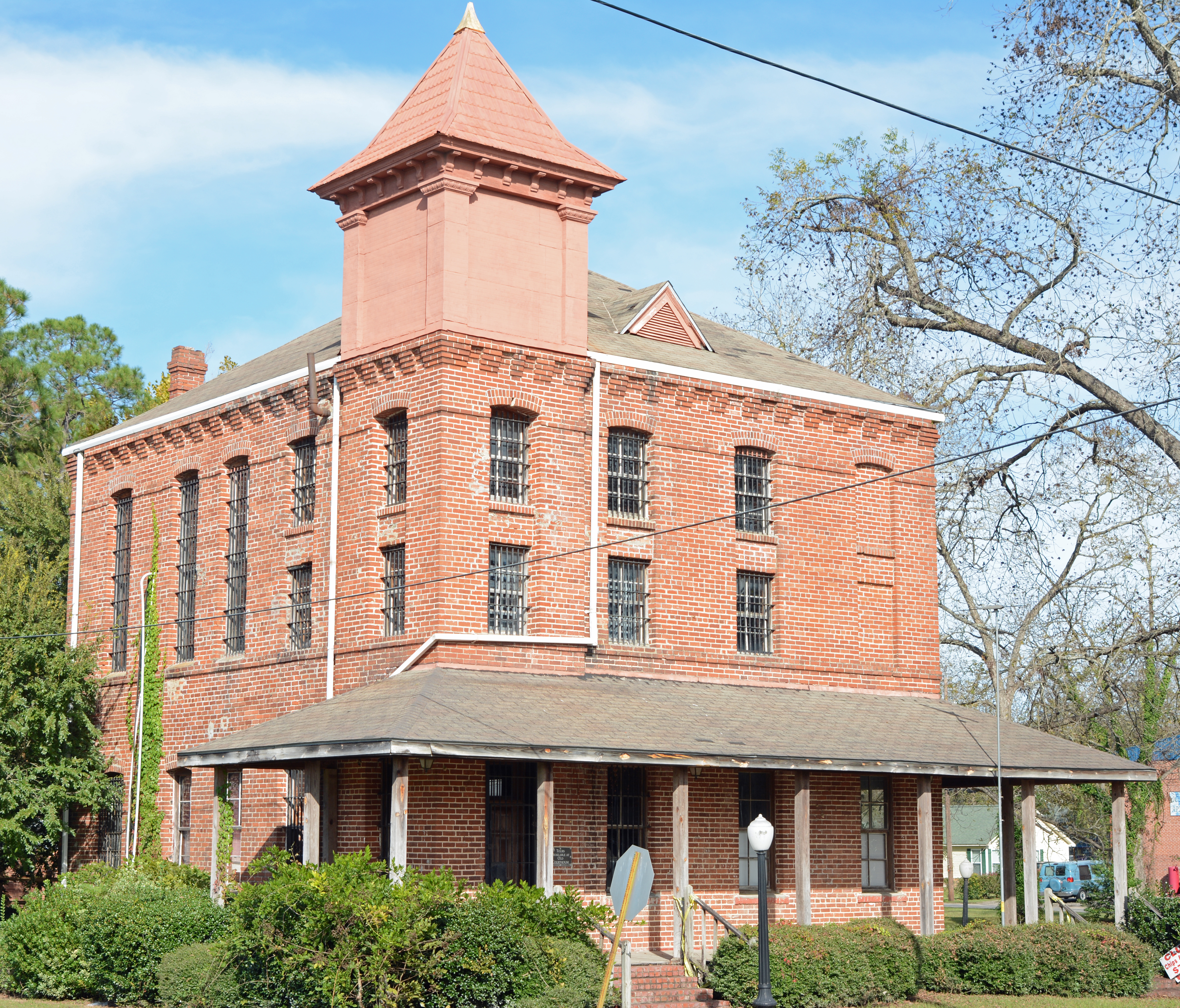
- The jail in 2015

- Location within Georgia Location within the United States
- Location: N. Jefferson St., Nashville, Georgia
- Coordinates: 31.20794°N 83.24898°W
- Area: less than one acre
- Architectural style: Romanesque
- MPS: County Jails of Ben Hill, Berrien, Brooks, and Turner Counties TR
- NRHP reference No.: 82002384
- Added to NRHP: August 26, 1982

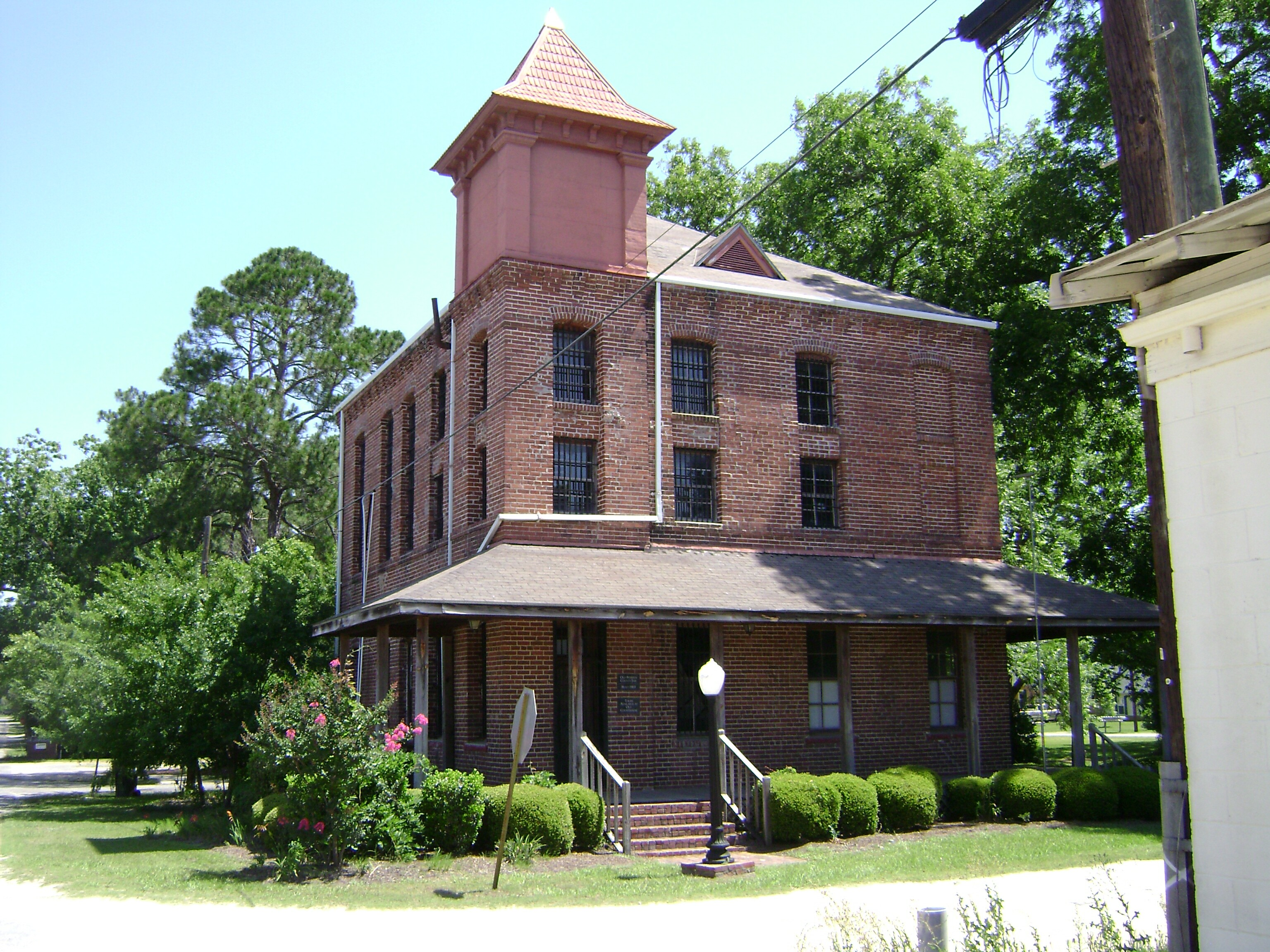
The jail in 2012

The Old Berrien County Jail is a historic site in Nashville, Berrien County, Georgia. It was built in 1903. It was added to the National Register of Historic Places on August 26, 1982. It is located at North Jefferson Street.

The Old Berrien County Jail was the site of the last hanging in Berrien County. A modern jail replaced the historic prison in 1965.

== See also ==
- Berrien County Courthouse
- National Register of Historic Places listings in Berrien County, Georgia
