= Heron Bay =

Heron Bay may refer to:

- Heron Bay, Georgia, census-designated place in Henry and Spalding Counties
- Heron Bay, New Brunswick, a town established in 2023
