= Glory, Georgia =

Unincorporated community in Georgia, U.S.

Coordinates: 31°22′05″N 83°08′37″W

Glory is an unincorporated community in Berrien County, Georgia, United States.

A post office called Glory was established in 1899, and remained in operation until being discontinued in 1910.
