= Dee Alford =

American gridiron football player (born 1997)

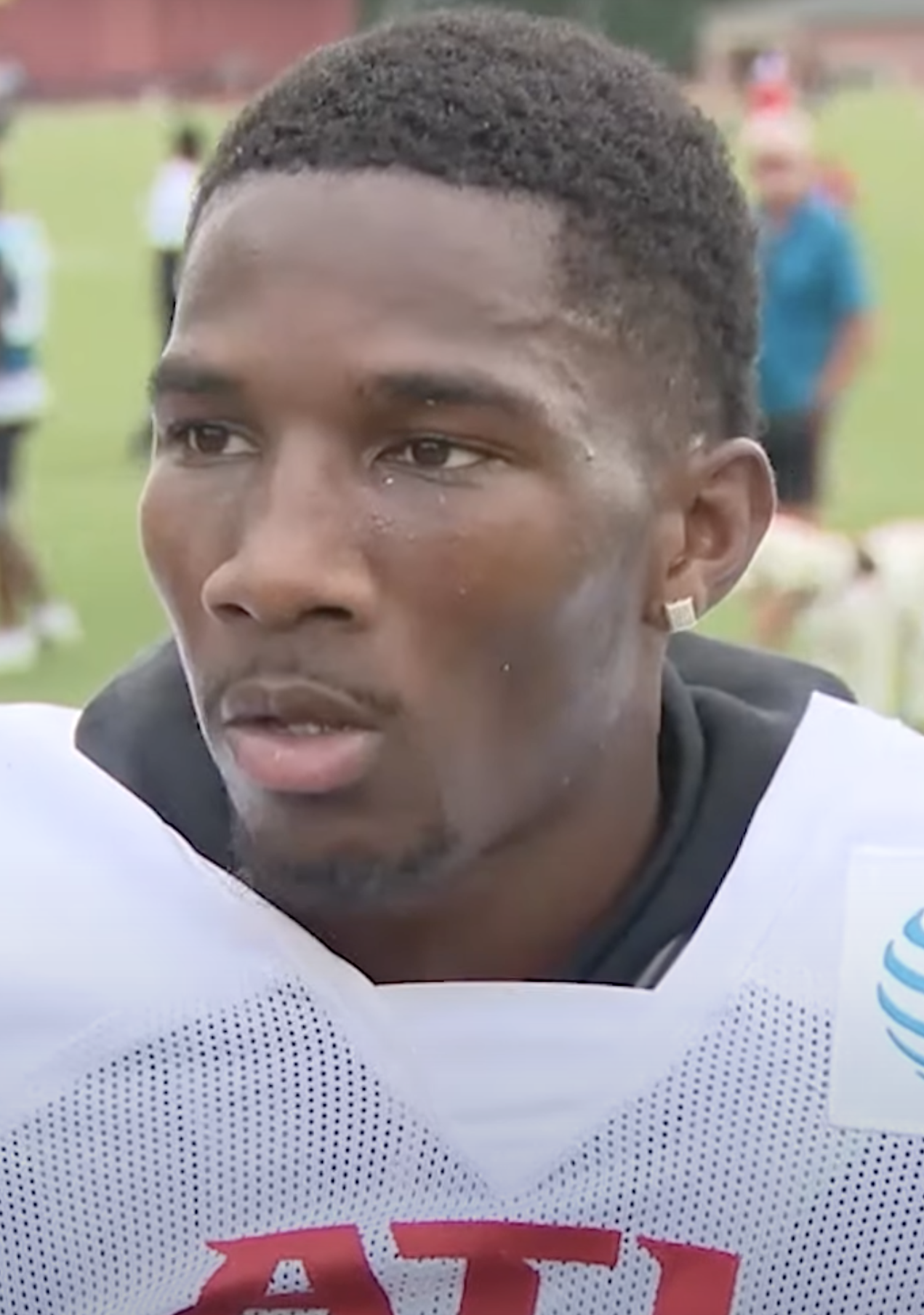
- Alford with the Atlanta Falcons in 2022.

No. 23 – Buffalo Bills
- Positions: Cornerback, punt returner
- Roster status: Active

Personal information
- Born: November 5, 1997 (age 29); Hernando, Mississippi, U.S.
- Listed height: 5 ft 11 in (1.80 m)
- Listed weight: 180 lb (82 kg)

Career information
- High school: Spalding (Griffin, Georgia)
- College: Tusculum (2016–2019)
- NFL draft: 2020: undrafted

Career history
- Winnipeg Blue Bombers (2020–2021); Atlanta Falcons (2022–2025); Buffalo Bills (2026–present)

Awards and highlights
- Grey Cup champion (2021)

Career NFL statistics as of Week 11, 2026
- Total tackles: 237
- Sacks: 3.5
- Forced fumbles: 2
- Fumble recoveries: 3
- Pass deflections: 42
- Interceptions: 5
- Stats at Pro Football Reference
- Stats at CFL.ca

DeAundre Alford (born November 5, 1997) is an American professional football cornerback and punt returner for the Buffalo Bills of the National Football League (NFL). He won the 108th Grey Cup with the Winnipeg Blue Bombers as a starter in his first season. He played college football for the Tusculum Pioneers.

== College career ==
Alford played college football for the Tusculum Pioneers from 2016 to 2019 where he played in 40 games and recorded 140 tackles and 10 interceptions. He also had 40 passes defended as a Pioneer, which is a school record.

== Professional career ==
Pre-draft measurables
Height	Weight
5 ft 11 in (1.80 m)	170 lb (77 kg)
Values from Pro Day

=== Winnipeg Blue Bombers ===
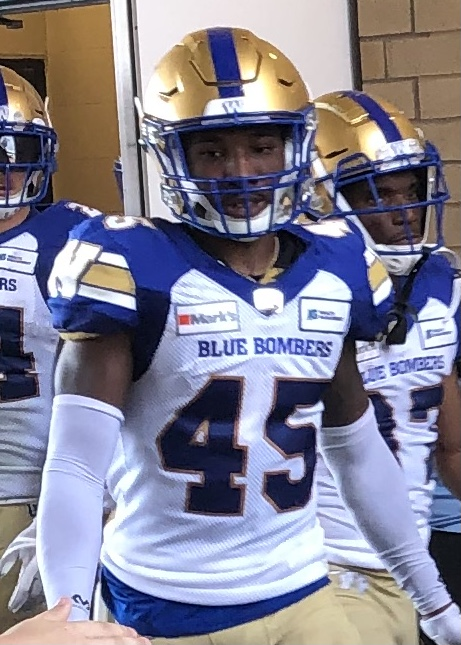
Alford during a Blue Bombers game in 2021.

Following his collegiate career, Alford signed with the Winnipeg Blue Bombers of the Canadian Football League (CFL) on February 10, 2020. However, due to the COVID-19 pandemic, he did not play in 2020 and several of his pro day workouts were canceled.

After completing training camp with the Blue Bombers in 2021, Alford won a starting job at cornerback and played in his first professional game on August 5, 2021, against the Hamilton Tiger-Cats where he recorded six defensive tackles. On September 18, 2021, he recorded his first career interception and first career touchdown as he picked off Edmonton Elks quarterback Taylor Cornelius and returned it 20 yards for the score. He finished the game with two tackles, two interceptions, and a forced fumble and was named the CFL's top performer of the week. He would help the Bombers' league-leading defense to their second consecutive Grey Cup title as they defeated the Tiger-Cats 33–25.

=== Atlanta Falcons ===
On January 10, 2022, Alford signed a reserve/future contract with the Atlanta Falcons. On October 2, during a game against the Cleveland Browns, he made a game-sealing interception on a pass thrown by Jacoby Brissett to win the game 23–20.

On April 7, 2025, Alford re-signed with the Falcons on a one-year deal.

=== Buffalo Bills ===
On March 12, 2026, Alford signed a three-year contract with the Buffalo Bills, worth up to $21 million.

== NFL career statistics ==
Legend
	Led the league
**Bold**	Career high

=== Regular season ===
Year	Team	Games		Tackles						Interceptions						Fumbles				
Year	Team	GP	GS	Cmb	Solo	Ast	Sck	TFL	Sfty	Int	Yds	Avg	Lng	TD	PD	FF	Fmb	FR	Yds	TD
2022	ATL	16	0	25	18	7	0.5	1	**1**	1	0	0.0	0	0	7	0	0	0	0	0
2023	ATL	16	5	41	25	16	0.0	2	0	0	0	0.0	0	0	6	0	**2**	**2**	0	0
2024	ATL	16	11	**83**	**61**	**22**	1.0	1	0	0	0	0.0	0	0	11	**1**	0	0	0	0
2025	ATL	16	7	67	55	12	**2.0**	**6**	0	**3**	**59**	19.7	**59**	0	**13**	**1**	0	1	**2**	0
2026	BUF	8	1	21	7	14	0.0	0	0	1	37	**37.0**	37	0	5	0	0	0	0	0
Career		72	24	237	166	71	3.5	10	1	5	96	19.2	59	0	42	2	2	3	2	0

== Personal life ==
Alford was born in Hernando, Mississippi and grew up in Griffin, Georgia.
