= Trevor Reid (gridiron football) =

American gridiron football player (born 2000)

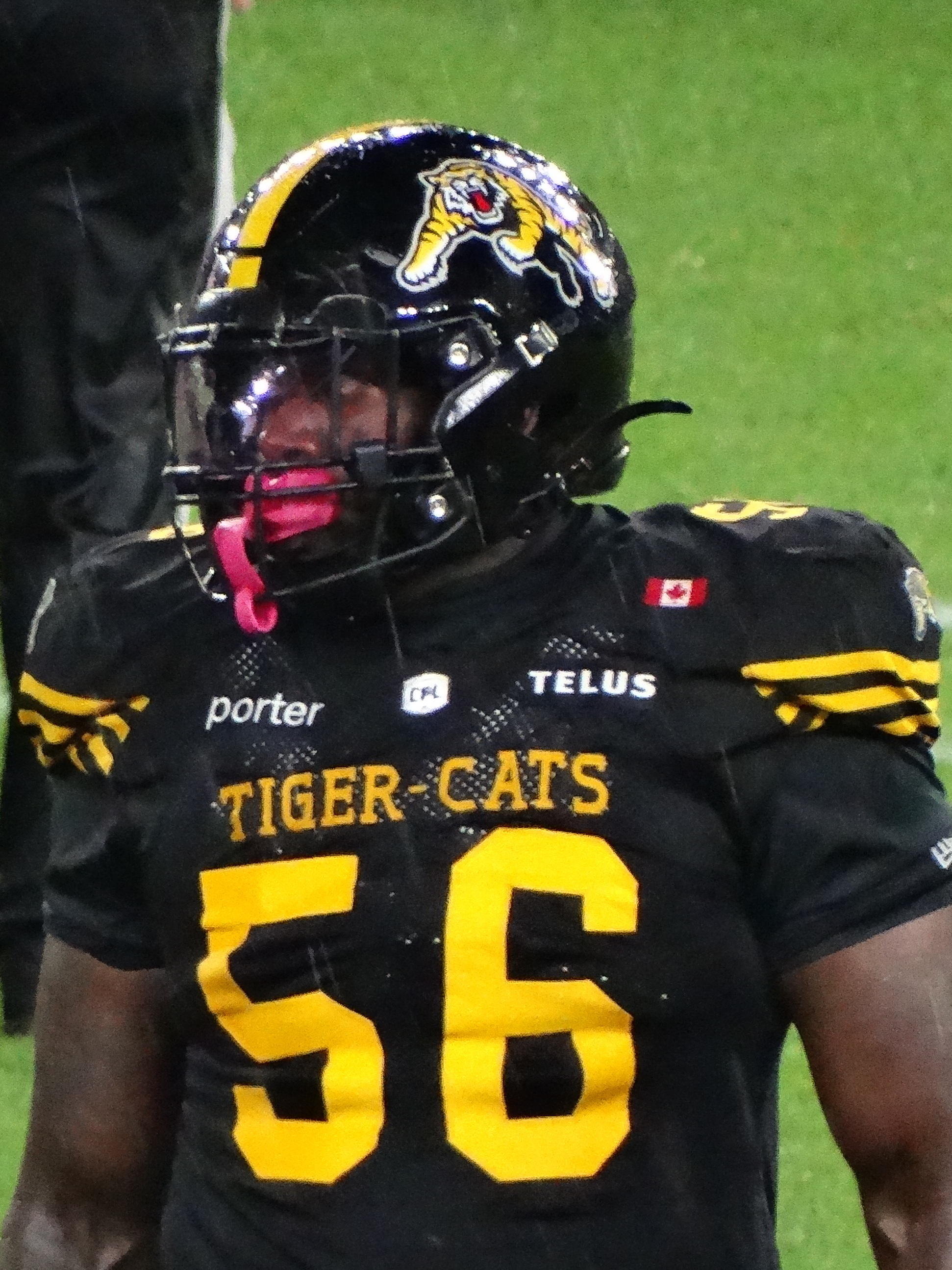
- Reid with the Hamilton Tiger-Cats in 2026

No. 56 – Hamilton Tiger-Cats
- Position: Offensive tackle
- Roster status: Active
- CFL status: American

Personal information
- Born: April 28, 2000 (age 26); Griffin, Georgia, U.S.
- Listed height: 6 ft 5 in (1.96 m)
- Listed weight: 312 lb (142 kg)

Career information
- High school: Spalding (Griffin, Georgia)
- College: Georgia Military (2018–2019); Louisville (2020–2022)
- NFL draft: 2023: undrafted

Career history
- Philadelphia Eagles (2023)*; Atlanta Falcons (2023)*; Saskatchewan Roughriders (2024); Minnesota Vikings (2025)*; Hamilton Tiger-Cats (2026–present)
- * Offseason or practice squad member only
- Stats at Pro Football Reference
- Stats at CFL.ca

Trevor Reid (born April 28, 2000) is an American professional football offensive tackle for the Hamilton Tiger-Cats of the Canadian Football League (CFL). He played college football for the Georgia Military Bulldogs and Louisville Cardinals.

== Early life and college ==
Reid was born on April 28, 2000, in Griffin, Georgia. He attended Spalding High School and first played football as a sophomore. After high school, he began attending Georgia Military College. He said that in high school "I wasn't doing the right stuff that I needed to be doing ... I had a 1.3 GPA and I wasn't going to class and I was doing stupid stuff," but said that attending Georgia Military College turned his life around.

Reid became a top player for the Georgia Military football team, being ranked as the number one junior college offensive tackle recruit nationally by 247Sports in 2019. He helped the team average 37.6 points and 186 rushing yards per game while being named a first-team All-American. He committed to continue his college football career with the Louisville Cardinals.

In his first year at Louisville, 2020, Reid appeared in nine games as a special teams player. The following year, he started all 13 games while allowing only two sacks. As a senior in 2022, he played 12 games, 11 as a starter, and helped Louisville average over 200 rushing yards per game.

== Professional career ==
Pre-draft measurables
Height	Weight	Arm length	Hand span	Wingspan	40-yard dash	10-yard split	20-yard split	20-yard shuttle	Three-cone drill	Vertical jump	Broad jump	Bench press
6 ft 4 1/8 in (1.93 m)	311 lb (141 kg)	34 5/8 in (0.88 m)	9 in (0.23 m)	7 ft 1 in (2.16 m)	5.01 s	1.77 s	2.81 s	4.58 s	7.34 s	38 in (0.97 m)	10 ft 4 in (3.15 m)	25 reps
All values from Pro Day

=== Philadelphia Eagles ===
After not being selected in the 2023 NFL draft, Reid signed with the Philadelphia Eagles as an undrafted free agent. He was waived on August 8, 2023.

=== Atlanta Falcons ===
Reid signed with the Atlanta Falcons on August 17, 2023. He was released at the final roster cuts, on August 29.

=== Saskatchewan Roughriders ===
Reid signed with the Saskatchewan Roughriders of the Canadian Football League (CFL) on December 4, 2023. After impressing in training camp, he made the team's final roster, being named the starting left tackle to open the 2024 season.

=== Minnesota Vikings ===
On January 9, 2025, Reid signed a reserve/future contract with the Minnesota Vikings. He was waived on April 22.

=== Dallas Renegades ===
On January 13, 2026, Reid was selected by the Dallas Renegades in the 2026 UFL Draft. However, he did not sign with the team.

=== Hamilton Tiger-Cats ===
On February 10, 2026, it was announced that Reid had signed a two-year contract with the Hamilton Tiger-Cats.

== Personal life ==
As of 2024, Reid has two sons.
