= Penny Houston =

American politician from Georgia

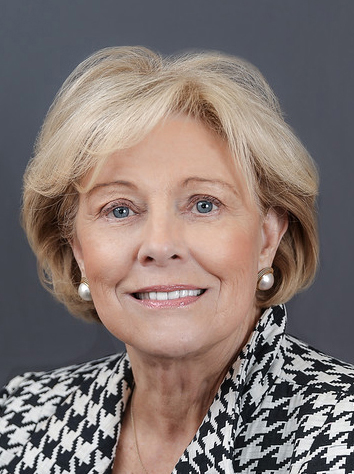

Member of the Georgia House of Representatives from the 170th district
- In office January 10, 2005 – January 13, 2025
- Preceded by: Roger Byrd
- Succeeded by: Jaclyn Ford

Member of the Georgia House of Representatives from the 139th district
- In office January 13, 2003 – January 10, 2005
- Preceded by: Larry O'Neal
- Succeeded by: David Lucas

Member of the Georgia House of Representatives from the 166th district
- In office December 17, 1997 – January 13, 2003
- Preceded by: Hanson Carter
- Succeeded by: Terry E. Barnard

Personal details
- Born: September 9, 1942 (age 83) Leary, Georgia
- Party: Republican (2004–present)
- Other political affiliations: Democratic (before 2004)

Penny Houston (born September 9, 1942) is an American politician who served in the Georgia House of Representatives from 1997 to 2025.
