= Georgia's 170th House of Representatives district =

State district in Georgia, USA

Georgia's 170th State House of Representatives district
Representative
Jaclyn Ford; R–Tifton
- Demographics: 68.1% White; 23.5% Black; 6.8% Hispanic; 0.5% Asian
- Population: 52,020

District 170 elects one member of the Georgia House of Representatives. It contains the entirety of Berrien County, as well as parts of Cook County and Tift County.

== Members ==
- Penny Houston (2005–2025)
- Jaclyn Ford (since 2025)
