= 1980 United States presidential election in Georgia =

- November 4, 1980
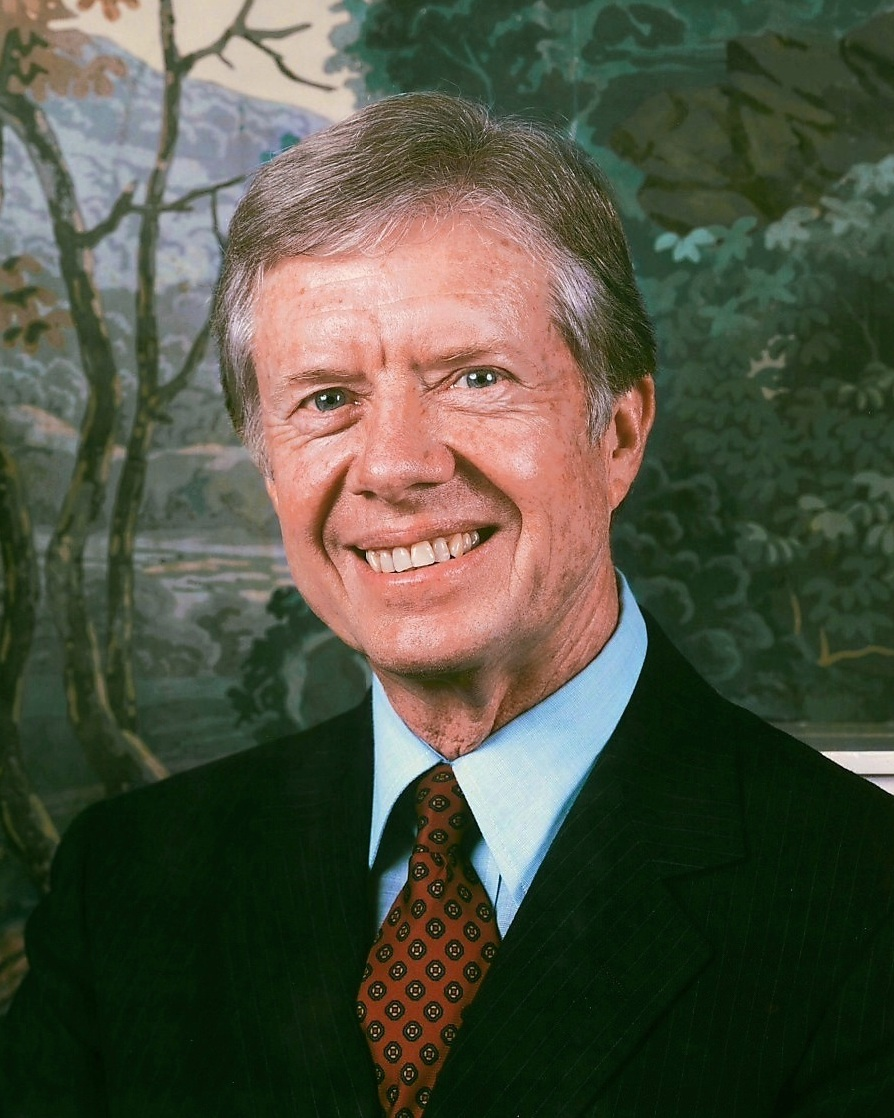

Nominee	Jimmy Carter	Ronald Reagan
Party	Democratic	Republican
Home state	Georgia	California
Running mate	Walter Mondale	George H. W. Bush
Electoral vote	12	0
Popular vote	893,733	655,168
Percentage	55.76%	40.95%
County results
Carter
40–50%
50–60%
60–70%
70–80%
Reagan
40–50%
50–60%
60–70%
President before election
Jimmy Carter
Democratic
Elected President
Ronald Reagan
Republican

The 1980 United States presidential election in Georgia took place on November 4, 1980, in Georgia as part of the 1980 United States presidential election. The Democratic Party candidate, incumbent President Jimmy Carter, won his home state of Georgia over former California Governor Ronald Reagan by 238,565 votes, one of just seven victories in the election (other than Georgia, Carter also carried Maryland, Minnesota, Hawaii, West Virginia, the District of Columbia and Rhode Island).

This was the last time in which the counties of McDuffie, Towns, Gilmer, Whitfield, Union, Rabun, Stephens, Jackson, Banks, Murray, Habersham, Madison, Hall, White, Dawson, Gordon, Paulding, Spalding, Troup, Forsyth, Upson, Coweta, Effingham, Glascock, Bulloch, Houston, Bartow, Oconee, Glynn, Cherokee, Toombs, Thomas, Floyd, Colquitt, Camden, Echols, Charlton, Pierce, Coffee, Bryan, Walton, Ware, Oglethorpe, Evans, Tattnall, Tift, Pike, Harris, Carroll, Appling, Barrow, and Wayne voted for a Democratic presidential candidate.

Georgia was the only state in the Deep South between the 1980 and 1988 presidential elections to support the Democratic nominee. Among white voters, 50% supported Carter, while 47% supported Reagan.

This is currently the most recent election in which the Republican candidate won the election without carrying the state. It is also the most recent election in which the Democratic candidate received a majority of the vote in the state.

== Primaries ==
1980 Democratic primary
Candidate	Votes	Delegates
Jimmy Carter (incumbent)	338,772	66
Ted Kennedy	32,315	0
Jerry Brown	7,255	0
Others	6,438	0
Totals	384,780	66

1980 Republican primary
Candidate	Votes	Deleagtes
Ronald Reagan	146,500	34
George H.W. Bush	25,293	6
John Anderson	16,853	0
Howard Baker	1,571	0
Others	9,953	0
Totals	200,170	40

== Results ==
1980 United States presidential election in Georgia
Party	Candidate	Running mate	Votes	Percentage	Electoral votes
Democratic	Jimmy Carter (incumbent)	Walter Mondale (incumbent)	890,733	55.76%	12
Republican	Ronald Reagan	George H. W. Bush	654,168	40.95%	0
Independent	John B. Anderson	Patrick Lucey	36,055	2.26%	0
Libertarian	Ed Clark	David Koch	15,627	0.99%	0
Other write-ins			884	0.1%	0

=== Results by county ===
County	Jimmy Carter Democratic		Ronald Reagan Republican		John B. Anderson Independent		Ed Clark Libertarian		Margin		Total votes cast
County	#	%	#	%	#	%	#	%	#	%	Total votes cast
Appling	2,985	59.62%	1,961	39.17%	41	0.82%	20	0.40%	1,024	20.45%	5,007
Atkinson	1,449	65.21%	747	33.62%	16	0.72%	10	0.45%	702	31.59%	2,222
Bacon	1,622	52.22%	1,427	45.94%	32	1.03%	25	0.80%	195	6.28%	3,106
Baker	1,035	66.18%	510	32.61%	11	0.70%	8	0.51%	525	33.57%	1,564
Baldwin	4,368	52.46%	3,639	43.71%	230	2.76%	89	1.07%	729	8.75%	8,326
Banks	2,091	72.91%	746	26.01%	18	0.63%	13	0.45%	1,345	46.90%	2,868
Barrow	3,876	61.44%	2,284	36.20%	99	1.57%	50	0.79%	1,592	25.24%	6,309
Bartow	7,490	69.01%	3,135	28.89%	135	1.24%	93	0.86%	4,355	40.12%	10,853
Ben Hill	2,544	62.55%	1,459	35.87%	41	1.01%	23	0.57%	1,085	26.68%	4,067
Berrien	2,869	65.15%	1,487	33.76%	24	0.54%	24	0.54%	1,382	31.39%	4,404
Bibb	31,770	66.01%	15,175	31.53%	848	1.76%	337	0.70%	16,595	34.48%	48,130
Bleckley	2,014	58.55%	1,261	36.66%	47	1.37%	118	3.43%	753	21.89%	3,440
Brantley	2,066	69.40%	882	29.63%	17	0.57%	12	0.40%	1,184	39.77%	2,977
Brooks	2,230	58.27%	1,546	40.40%	39	1.02%	12	0.31%	684	17.87%	3,827
Bryan	1,966	60.77%	1,212	37.47%	51	1.58%	6	0.19%	754	23.30%	3,235
Bulloch	4,921	55.16%	3,750	42.04%	160	1.79%	90	1.01%	1,171	13.12%	8,921
Burke	3,047	61.05%	1,871	37.49%	56	1.12%	17	0.34%	1,176	23.56%	4,991
Butts	2,574	66.94%	1,210	31.47%	38	0.99%	23	0.60%	1,364	35.47%	3,845
Calhoun	1,414	67.75%	652	31.24%	16	0.77%	5	0.24%	762	36.51%	2,087
Camden	2,924	65.81%	1,439	32.39%	62	1.40%	18	0.41%	1,485	33.42%	4,443
Candler	1,358	56.09%	1,030	42.54%	24	0.99%	9	0.37%	328	13.55%	2,421
Carroll	8,202	56.66%	5,815	40.17%	294	2.03%	164	1.13%	2,387	16.49%	14,475
Catoosa	4,921	44.50%	5,962	53.91%	121	1.09%	55	0.50%	-1,041	-9.41%	11,059
Charlton	1,469	64.26%	779	34.08%	26	1.14%	12	0.52%	690	30.18%	2,286
Chatham	28,413	50.04%	26,499	46.67%	1,244	2.19%	625	1.10%	1,914	3.37%	56,781
Chattahoochee	476	63.30%	256	34.04%	16	2.13%	4	0.53%	220	29.26%	752
Chattooga	4,279	67.60%	1,946	30.74%	61	0.96%	44	0.70%	2,333	36.86%	6,330
Cherokee	6,020	51.55%	5,250	44.96%	230	1.97%	178	1.52%	770	6.59%	11,678
Clarke	10,519	52.86%	8,094	40.68%	1,060	5.33%	226	1.14%	2,425	12.18%	19,899
Clay	909	73.25%	316	25.46%	9	0.73%	7	0.56%	593	47.79%	1,241
Clayton	17,540	46.10%	19,160	50.35%	923	2.43%	428	1.12%	-1,620	-4.25%	38,051
Clinch	1,325	71.08%	513	27.52%	18	0.97%	8	0.43%	812	43.56%	1,864
Cobb	39,157	40.87%	51,977	54.25%	3,229	3.37%	1,453	1.52%	-12,820	-13.38%	95,816
Coffee	4,038	60.99%	2,499	37.74%	58	0.88%	26	0.39%	1,539	23.25%	6,621
Colquitt	5,353	59.03%	3,593	39.62%	80	0.88%	43	0.47%	1,760	19.41%	9,069
Columbia	5,335	44.69%	6,293	52.71%	248	2.08%	62	0.52%	-958	-8.02%	11,938
Cook	2,461	66.80%	1,188	32.25%	25	0.68%	10	0.27%	1,273	34.55%	3,684
Coweta	5,697	54.66%	4,480	42.99%	161	1.54%	84	0.81%	1,217	11.67%	10,422
Crawford	1,673	70.44%	642	27.03%	35	1.47%	25	1.05%	1,031	43.41%	2,375
Crisp	3,403	63.64%	1,861	34.80%	54	1.01%	29	0.54%	1,542	28.84%	5,347
Dade	1,735	44.16%	2,114	53.81%	62	1.58%	18	0.46%	-379	-9.65%	3,929
Dawson	1,072	58.36%	729	39.68%	23	1.25%	13	0.71%	343	18.68%	1,837
Decatur	3,242	51.93%	2,919	46.76%	54	0.86%	28	0.45%	323	5.17%	6,243
DeKalb	82,743	49.43%	74,904	44.74%	7,241	4.33%	2,517	1.50%	7,839	4.69%	167,405
Dodge	4,635	71.83%	1,719	26.64%	56	0.87%	43	0.67%	2,916	45.19%	6,453
Dooly	2,364	67.50%	1,083	30.93%	31	0.89%	24	0.69%	1,281	36.57%	3,502
Dougherty	13,430	50.46%	12,726	47.82%	326	1.22%	133	0.50%	704	2.64%	26,615
Douglas	6,807	47.81%	6,945	48.78%	304	2.14%	182	1.28%	-138	-0.97%	14,238
Early	2,110	57.31%	1,538	41.77%	23	0.62%	11	0.30%	572	15.54%	3,682
Echols	515	65.77%	259	33.08%	8	1.02%	1	0.13%	256	32.69%	783
Effingham	2,783	51.76%	2,528	47.02%	38	0.71%	28	0.52%	255	4.74%	5,377
Elbert	4,014	66.23%	1,967	32.45%	50	0.82%	30	0.49%	2,047	33.78%	6,061
Emanuel	3,971	63.53%	2,199	35.18%	45	0.72%	36	0.58%	1,772	28.35%	6,251
Evans	1,456	56.54%	1,090	42.33%	20	0.78%	9	0.35%	366	14.21%	2,575
Fannin	2,526	43.34%	3,196	54.83%	61	1.05%	46	0.79%	-670	-11.49%	5,829
Fayette	3,798	36.00%	6,351	60.20%	272	2.58%	128	1.21%	-2,553	-24.20%	10,549
Floyd	13,710	58.10%	9,220	39.07%	398	1.69%	268	1.14%	4,490	19.03%	23,596
Forsyth	4,325	55.91%	3,157	40.81%	160	2.07%	94	1.22%	1,168	15.10%	7,736
Franklin	3,528	71.13%	1,387	27.96%	30	0.60%	15	0.30%	2,141	43.17%	4,960
Fulton	118,748	61.62%	64,909	33.68%	6,738	3.50%	2,328	1.21%	53,839	27.94%	192,723
Gilmer	2,246	49.50%	2,170	47.83%	72	1.59%	49	1.08%	76	1.67%	4,537
Glascock	614	53.95%	510	44.82%	7	0.62%	7	0.62%	104	9.13%	1,138
Glynn	7,540	49.69%	7,214	47.54%	296	1.95%	123	0.81%	326	2.15%	15,173
Gordon	5,199	60.86%	3,107	36.37%	141	1.65%	95	1.11%	2,092	24.49%	8,542
Grady	3,023	59.08%	2,018	39.44%	56	1.09%	20	0.39%	1,005	19.64%	5,117
Greene	2,571	71.96%	961	26.90%	29	0.81%	12	0.34%	1,610	45.06%	3,573
Gwinnett	21,958	42.68%	27,185	52.84%	1,497	2.91%	812	1.58%	-5,227	-10.16%	51,452
Habersham	4,394	64.80%	2,224	32.80%	100	1.47%	63	0.93%	2,170	32.00%	6,781
Hall	12,124	59.08%	7,760	37.81%	463	2.26%	174	0.85%	4,364	21.27%	20,521
Hancock	2,205	78.50%	573	20.40%	23	0.82%	8	0.28%	1,632	58.10%	2,809
Haralson	3,606	60.50%	2,229	37.40%	71	1.19%	54	0.91%	1,377	23.10%	5,960
Harris	2,807	56.80%	2,001	40.49%	100	2.02%	34	0.69%	806	16.31%	4,942
Hart	4,539	73.03%	1,577	25.37%	59	0.95%	40	0.64%	2,962	47.66%	6,215
Heard	1,348	59.05%	875	38.33%	35	1.53%	25	1.10%	473	20.72%	2,283
Henry	5,635	50.01%	5,326	47.27%	163	1.45%	144	1.28%	309	2.74%	11,268
Houston	10,915	52.74%	9,005	43.51%	536	2.59%	239	1.15%	1,910	9.23%	20,695
Irwin	1,555	59.08%	1,056	40.12%	11	0.42%	10	0.38%	499	18.96%	2,632
Jackson	4,591	66.07%	2,209	31.79%	107	1.54%	42	0.60%	2,382	34.28%	6,949
Jasper	1,546	62.24%	879	35.39%	38	1.53%	21	0.85%	667	26.85%	2,484
Jeff Davis	2,059	62.19%	1,191	35.97%	40	1.21%	21	0.63%	868	26.22%	3,311
Jefferson	3,305	66.39%	1,605	32.24%	44	0.88%	24	0.48%	1,700	34.15%	4,978
Jenkins	1,632	65.46%	824	33.05%	24	0.96%	13	0.52%	808	32.41%	2,493
Johnson	1,854	61.21%	1,123	37.07%	29	0.96%	23	0.76%	731	24.14%	3,029
Jones	3,239	62.05%	1,828	35.02%	112	2.15%	41	0.79%	1,411	27.03%	5,220
Lamar	2,453	64.08%	1,298	33.91%	42	1.10%	35	0.91%	1,155	30.17%	3,828
Lanier	1,116	69.58%	470	29.30%	9	0.56%	9	0.56%	646	40.28%	1,604
Laurens	7,860	62.76%	4,392	35.07%	147	1.17%	124	0.99%	3,468	27.69%	12,523
Lee	1,670	45.62%	1,942	53.05%	26	0.71%	23	0.63%	-272	-7.43%	3,661
Liberty	3,099	66.18%	1,507	32.18%	49	1.05%	28	0.60%	1,592	34.00%	4,683
Lincoln	1,617	66.27%	806	33.03%	10	0.41%	7	0.29%	811	33.24%	2,440
Long	1,202	68.96%	514	29.49%	23	1.32%	4	0.23%	688	39.47%	1,743
Lowndes	5,989	46.38%	6,622	51.29%	214	1.66%	87	0.67%	-633	-4.91%	12,912
Lumpkin	1,951	63.24%	1,024	33.19%	83	2.69%	27	0.88%	927	30.05%	3,085
McDuffie	2,667	56.95%	1,928	41.17%	59	1.26%	29	0.62%	739	15.78%	4,683
McIntosh	2,104	69.01%	876	28.73%	38	1.25%	31	1.02%	1,228	40.28%	3,049
Macon	3,025	76.02%	894	22.47%	39	0.98%	21	0.53%	2,131	53.55%	3,979
Madison	2,980	55.17%	2,330	43.14%	59	1.09%	32	0.59%	650	12.03%	5,401
Marion	1,174	66.22%	567	31.98%	16	0.90%	16	0.90%	607	34.24%	1,773
Meriwether	3,876	66.77%	1,838	31.66%	59	1.02%	32	0.55%	2,038	35.11%	5,805
Miller	1,127	54.90%	900	43.84%	19	0.93%	7	0.34%	227	11.06%	2,053
Mitchell	3,566	60.89%	2,231	38.10%	40	0.68%	19	0.32%	1,335	22.79%	5,856
Monroe	2,542	65.85%	1,242	32.18%	43	1.11%	33	0.85%	1,300	33.67%	3,860
Montgomery	1,663	62.99%	948	35.91%	23	0.87%	6	0.23%	715	27.08%	2,640
Morgan	2,276	62.00%	1,323	36.04%	57	1.55%	15	0.41%	953	25.96%	3,671
Murray	3,094	65.82%	1,538	32.72%	42	0.89%	27	0.57%	1,556	33.10%	4,701
Muscogee	23,272	58.82%	15,203	38.42%	811	2.05%	280	0.71%	8,069	20.40%	39,566
Newton	5,611	61.96%	3,206	35.40%	150	1.66%	89	0.98%	2,405	26.56%	9,056
Oconee	2,141	49.03%	2,065	47.29%	106	2.43%	55	1.26%	76	1.74%	4,367
Oglethorpe	1,611	56.41%	1,187	41.56%	44	1.54%	14	0.49%	424	14.85%	2,856
Paulding	4,686	60.72%	2,845	36.87%	97	1.26%	89	1.15%	1,841	23.85%	7,717
Peach	3,415	66.05%	1,642	31.76%	68	1.32%	45	0.87%	1,773	34.29%	5,170
Pickens	2,358	57.84%	1,612	39.54%	73	1.79%	34	0.83%	746	18.30%	4,077
Pierce	1,918	64.25%	1,027	34.41%	21	0.70%	19	0.64%	891	29.84%	2,985
Pike	1,755	56.72%	1,271	41.08%	45	1.45%	23	0.74%	484	15.64%	3,094
Polk	5,421	63.31%	2,949	34.44%	116	1.35%	76	0.89%	2,472	28.87%	8,562
Pulaski	1,997	61.79%	1,153	35.67%	54	1.67%	28	0.87%	844	26.12%	3,232
Putnam	1,951	61.41%	1,166	36.70%	35	1.10%	25	0.79%	785	24.71%	3,177
Quitman	589	70.37%	240	28.67%	2	0.24%	6	0.72%	349	41.70%	837
Rabun	2,327	66.58%	1,070	30.62%	67	1.92%	31	0.89%	1,257	35.96%	3,495
Randolph	1,861	67.85%	879	32.05%	1	0.04%	2	0.07%	982	35.80%	2,743
Richmond	24,104	53.72%	19,619	43.72%	887	1.98%	261	0.58%	4,485	10.00%	44,871
Rockdale	4,395	43.66%	5,300	52.65%	219	2.18%	153	1.52%	-905	-8.99%	10,067
Schley	613	56.50%	453	41.75%	9	0.83%	10	0.92%	160	14.75%	1,085
Screven	2,117	57.78%	1,490	40.67%	36	0.98%	21	0.57%	627	17.11%	3,664
Seminole	1,794	61.10%	1,117	38.04%	16	0.54%	9	0.31%	677	23.06%	2,936
Spalding	7,176	58.19%	4,809	39.00%	248	2.01%	98	0.79%	2,367	19.19%	12,331
Stephens	4,529	67.68%	2,045	30.56%	69	1.03%	49	0.73%	2,484	37.12%	6,692
Stewart	1,440	69.00%	611	29.28%	23	1.10%	13	0.62%	829	39.72%	2,087
Sumter	4,956	61.49%	2,957	36.69%	103	1.28%	44	0.55%	1,999	24.80%	8,060
Talbot	1,635	72.89%	572	25.50%	20	0.89%	16	0.71%	1,063	47.39%	2,243
Taliaferro	670	70.23%	270	28.30%	8	0.84%	6	0.63%	400	41.93%	954
Tattnall	2,864	57.26%	2,082	41.62%	37	0.74%	19	0.38%	782	15.64%	5,002
Taylor	1,845	68.38%	815	30.21%	19	0.70%	19	0.70%	1,030	38.17%	2,698
Telfair	2,700	68.51%	1,173	29.76%	41	1.04%	27	0.69%	1,527	38.75%	3,941
Terrell	2,010	58.77%	1,378	40.29%	21	0.61%	11	0.32%	632	18.48%	3,420
Thomas	5,695	56.05%	4,294	42.26%	117	1.15%	55	0.54%	1,401	13.79%	10,161
Tift	4,572	56.99%	3,280	40.89%	99	1.23%	71	0.89%	1,292	16.10%	8,022
Toombs	3,255	52.53%	2,835	45.75%	68	1.10%	39	0.63%	420	6.78%	6,197
Towns	1,510	49.27%	1,475	48.12%	57	1.86%	23	0.75%	35	1.15%	3,065
Treutlen	1,307	65.22%	668	33.33%	21	1.05%	8	0.40%	639	31.89%	2,004
Troup	7,716	57.46%	5,398	40.20%	191	1.42%	124	0.92%	2,318	17.26%	13,429
Turner	1,990	68.13%	898	30.74%	16	0.55%	17	0.58%	1,092	37.39%	2,921
Twiggs	2,213	74.26%	747	25.07%	8	0.27%	12	0.40%	1,466	49.19%	2,980
Union	1,700	51.34%	1,546	46.69%	43	1.30%	22	0.66%	154	4.65%	3,311
Upson	4,713	61.73%	2,788	36.52%	77	1.01%	57	0.75%	1,925	25.21%	7,635
Walker	6,809	48.18%	7,088	50.16%	171	1.21%	64	0.45%	-279	-1.98%	14,132
Walton	4,525	61.96%	2,618	35.85%	112	1.53%	48	0.66%	1,907	26.11%	7,303
Ware	6,307	62.22%	3,715	36.65%	77	0.76%	38	0.37%	2,592	25.57%	10,137
Warren	1,517	65.36%	779	33.56%	20	0.86%	5	0.22%	738	31.80%	2,321
Washington	3,452	64.35%	1,822	33.97%	60	1.12%	30	0.56%	1,630	30.38%	5,364
Wayne	3,843	62.42%	2,213	35.94%	52	0.84%	49	0.80%	1,630	26.48%	6,157
Webster	608	64.68%	312	33.19%	8	0.85%	12	1.28%	296	31.49%	940
Wheeler	1,599	73.15%	550	25.16%	28	1.28%	9	0.41%	1,049	47.99%	2,186
White	2,017	61.36%	1,175	35.75%	58	1.76%	37	1.13%	842	25.61%	3,287
Whitfield	9,691	58.95%	6,404	38.96%	229	1.39%	115	0.70%	3,287	19.99%	16,439
Wilcox	1,780	67.68%	827	31.44%	13	0.49%	10	0.38%	953	36.24%	2,630
Wilkes	2,350	64.86%	1,212	33.45%	31	0.86%	30	0.83%	1,138	31.41%	3,623
Wilkinson	2,365	66.96%	1,116	31.60%	31	0.88%	20	0.57%	1,249	35.36%	3,532
Worth	2,567	54.68%	2,076	44.22%	35	0.75%	17	0.36%	491	10.46%	4,695
Totals	890,733	55.76%	654,168	40.95%	36,055	2.26%	15,627	0.98%	236,565	14.81%	1,597,467

==== Counties that flipped from Democratic to Republican ====
- Catoosa
- Clayton
- Cobb
- Columbia
- Dade
- Douglas
- Fannin
- Fayette
- Gwinnett
- Lee
- Lowndes
- Rockdale
- Walker

=== Results by congressional district ===
District	Reagan	Carter	Representative
1st	42.9%	55.5%	Bo Ginn
2nd	42.0%	57.0%	Dawson Mathis (96th Congress)
2nd	42.0%	57.0%	Charles Hatcher (97th Congress)
3rd	37.4%	60.9%	Jack Brinkley
4th	44.7%	51.1%	Elliott H. Levitas
5th	35.2%	60.8%	Wyche Fowler
6th	40.7%	57.4%	Newt Gingrich
7th	47.4%	50.1%	Larry McDonald
8th	34.2%	64.4%	Billy Lee Evans
9th	42.7%	55.4%	Ed Jenkins
10th	41.0%	57.0%	Doug Barnard Jr.

== Works cited ==
- Black, Earl; Black, Merle (1992). The Vital South: How Presidents Are Elected. Harvard University Press. ISBN 0674941306.
- Moreland, Laurence; Steed, Robert; Baker, Tod, eds. (1991). The 1988 Presidential Election in the South: Continuity Amidst Change in Southern Party Politics. Praeger Publishers. ISBN 0275931455.
