= Bannockburn, Georgia =

- Unincorporated community
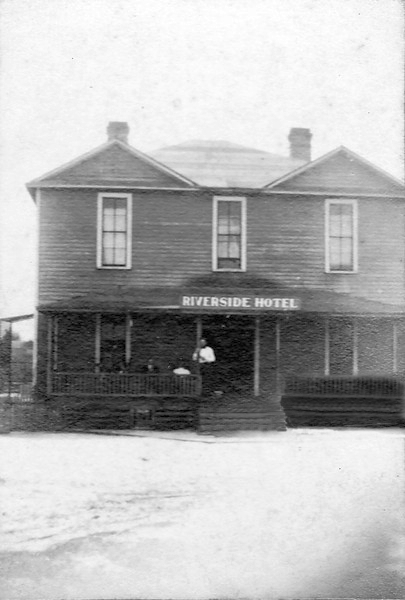
- Riverside Hotel in Bannockburn, circa 1905

- Location within Georgia
- Coordinates: 31°17′06″N 83°03′27″W
- Country: United States
- State: Georgia
- County: Berrien
- Elevation: 226 ft (69 m)
- Time zone: UTC-5 (Eastern (EST))
  - Summer (DST): UTC-4 (EDT)
- GNIS feature ID: 326166

Bannockburn is an unincorporated community in Berrien County, Georgia, United States.

The former Central of Georgia Railway ran through the settlement.

The Riverside Hotel in Bannockburn was built around 1905. At the same time, the Massey Felton Lumber Company operated a sawmill on the west side of the Alapaha River, about 1 mi (1.6 km) east of Bannockburn. The mill closed about 1910.
