= National Register of Historic Places listings in Berrien County, Georgia =

This is a list of properties and districts in Berrien County, Georgia that are listed on the National Register of Historic Places (NRHP).

This National Park Service list is complete through NPS recent listings posted March 21, 2025.

== Current listings ==
	Name on the Register	Image	Date listed	Location	City or town	Description
1	Alapaha Colored School	Alapaha Colored School	July 11, 2002 (#02000758)	Henry St., S of jct. with George St. 31°22′41″N 83°13′27″W	Alapaha	Built in 1924
2	Berrien County Courthouse	Berrien County Courthouse	December 9, 1977 (#77000409)	Town Square; 31°12′24″N 83°14′59″W	Nashville	Built in 1898
3	Berrien County Jail	Berrien County Jail	August 26, 1982 (#82002384)	N. Jefferson St. 31°12′29″N 83°14′56″W	Nashville	Built in 1903
4	William G. Harrison House	William G. Harrison House	January 30, 1995 (#94001636)	313 S. Bartow St. 31°12′15″N 83°15′06″W	Nashville	Built in 1904
