= Alapaha Colored School =

Historic school in the US state of Georgia

- U.S. National Register of Historic Places
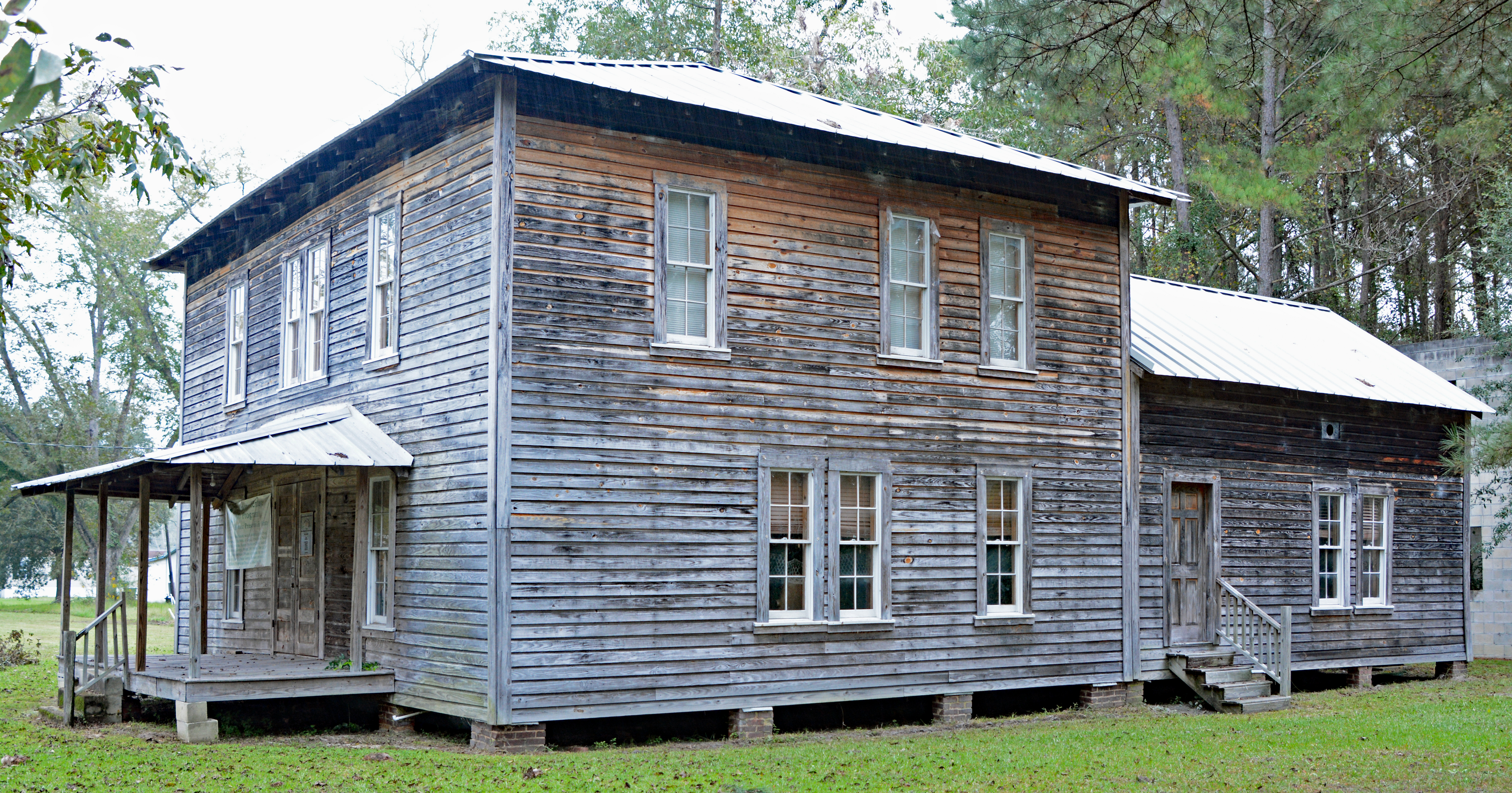

- Location within Georgia Location within the United States
- Location: Henry St., S of jct. with George St., Alapaha, Georgia
- Coordinates: 31°22′41″N 83°13′27″W
- Area: less than one acre
- Built: 1924
- NRHP reference No.: 02000758
- Added to NRHP: July 11, 2002

Alapaha Colored School is a historic school building in Alapaha, Georgia, located on Henry Street South of the junction with George Street. It is one of the last surviving two-story wood-frame African-American school buildings in Georgia. It was built with a brick foundation in 1924. There are two rooms downstairs and one large room upstairs. It was the school serving the local African-American community from 1924 until 1954. It was added to the National Register of Historic Places on July 11, 2002.

In 1945 a one-story ell was added in the rear of the building. In 1954, African-American community school in the area were consolidated into one, the Nashville High and Elementary School.

== See also ==
- National Register of Historic Places listings in Berrien County, Georgia
