= Spalding County, Georgia =

County in Georgia, United States

- County
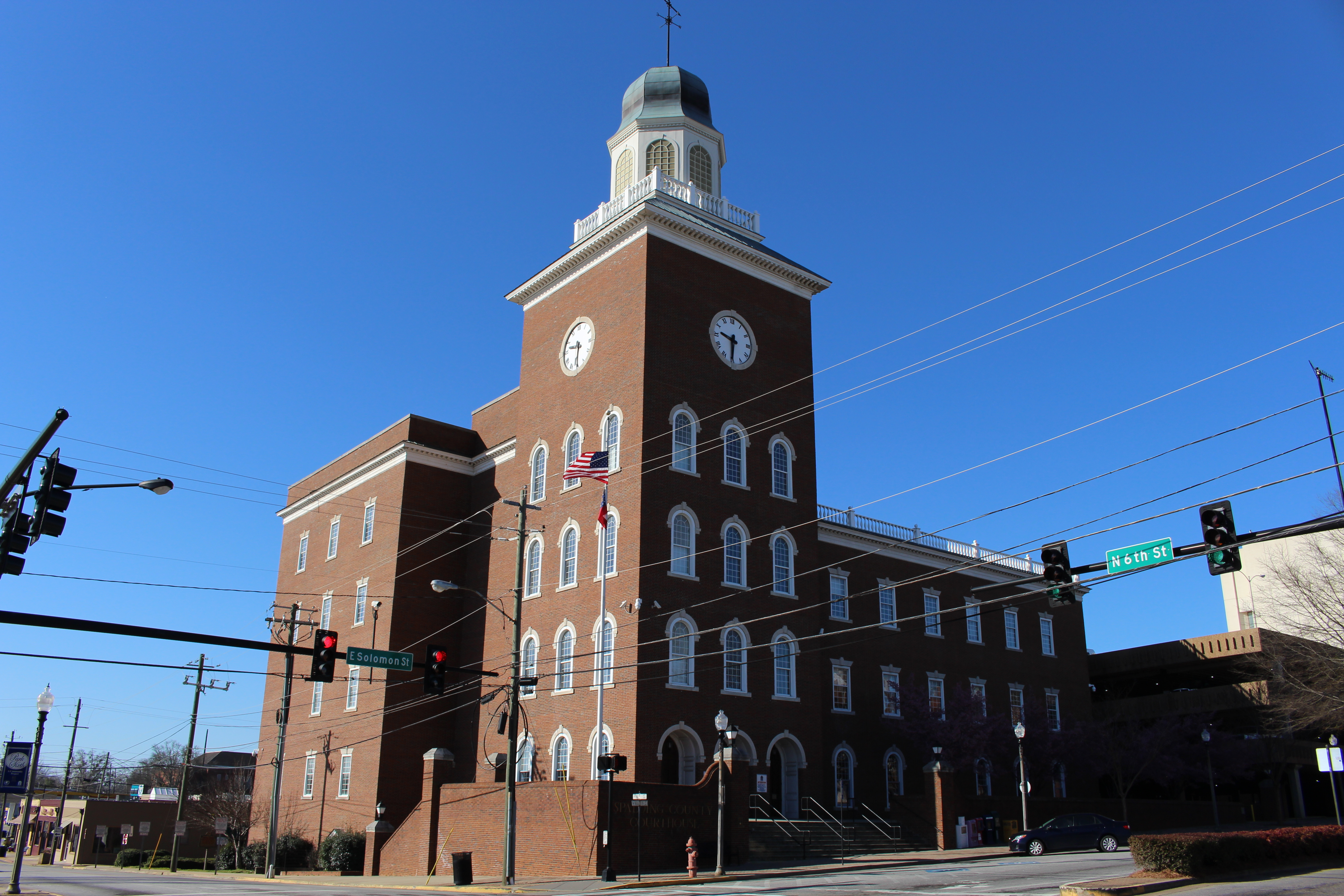
- Spalding County Courthouse in Griffin

- Logo

- Location within the U.S. state of Georgia
- Coordinates: 33°16′N 84°17′W
- Country: United States
- State: Georgia
- Founded: 1851; 175 years ago
- Named for: Thomas Spalding
- Seat: Griffin
- Largest city: Griffin

Area
  - Total: 200 sq mi (520 km^{2})
  - Land: 196 sq mi (510 km^{2})
  - Water: 3.1 sq mi (8.0 km^{2}) 1.6%

Population (2020)
  - Total: 67,306
  - Estimate (2025): 70,775 ▲
  - Density: 343/sq mi (133/km^{2})
- Time zone: UTC−5 (Eastern)
  - Summer (DST): UTC−4 (EDT)
- Congressional district: 3rd
- Website: spaldingcounty.com

Spalding County is a county in the West Central region of the U.S. state of Georgia. As of the 2020 census, the population was 67,306. The county seat is Griffin. The county was created December 20, 1851, and named for former United States representative and senator Thomas Spalding.

Spalding County is included in the Atlanta-Sandy Springs-Roswell MSA.

== Geography ==
According to the U.S. Census Bureau, the county has a total area of 200 square miles (520 km^{2}), of which 196 square miles (510 km^{2}) is land and 3.1 square miles (8.0 km^{2}) (1.6%) is water. The county is located in the Piedmont region of the state.

The western portion of Spalding County, west of a line from Sunny Side through Griffin to Orchard Hill, is located in the Upper Flint River sub-basin of the ACF River Basin (Apalachicola-Chattahoochee-Flint River Basin). The eastern part of the county is located in the Upper Ocmulgee River sub-basin of the Altamaha River basin.

=== Major highways ===
- Interstate 75 / State Route 401 (unsigned)
- U.S. Route 19 / U.S. Route 41 / State Route 3
  - U.S. Route 19 Business / U.S. Route 41 Business
- State Route 7
- State Route 16
- State Route 92
- State Route 155
- State Route 362

=== Adjacent counties ===
- Henry County (northeast)
- Butts County (east)
- Lamar County (southeast)
- Pike County (southwest)
- Meriwether County (west)
- Coweta County (west)
- Fayette County (northwest)
- Clayton County (northwest)

== Communities ==
=== Cities ===
- Griffin (county seat)

=== Town ===
- Orchard Hill

=== Census-designated places ===
- East Griffin
- Experiment
- Heron Bay (partly in Henry County)
- Sunny Side (formerly a city)

== Demographics ==
Historical population
Census	Pop.	Note	%±
1860	8,699		—
1870	10,205		17.3%
1880	12,585		23.3%
1890	13,117		4.2%
1900	17,619		34.3%
1910	19,741		12.0%
1920	21,908		11.0%
1930	23,495		7.2%
1940	28,427		21.0%
1950	31,045		9.2%
1960	35,404		14.0%
1970	39,514		11.6%
1980	47,899		21.2%
1990	54,457		13.7%
2000	58,417		7.3%
2010	64,073		9.7%
2020	67,306		5.0%
2025 (est.)	70,775	▲	5.2%
U.S. Decennial Census; 1790-1880 1890-1910; 1920-1930 1930-1940; 1940-1950 1960-1980; 1980-2000 2010 2020

=== Racial and ethnic composition ===
Spalding County, Georgia – Racial and ethnic composition Note: the US Census treats Hispanic/Latino as an ethnic category. This table excludes Latinos from the racial categories and assigns them to a separate category. Hispanics/Latinos may be of any race.
Race / Ethnicity (NH = Non-Hispanic)	Pop 1980	Pop 1990	Pop 2000	Pop 2010	Pop 2020	% 1980	% 1990	% 2000	% 2010	% 2020
White alone (NH)	34,559	38,057	38,435	38,986	37,105	72.15%	69.88%	65.79%	60.85%	55.13%
Black or African American alone (NH)	12,760	15,750	18,076	20,937	23,148	26.64%	28.92%	30.94%	32.68%	34.39%
Native American or Alaska Native alone (NH)	56	88	121	153	154	0.12%	0.16%	0.21%	0.24%	0.23%
Asian alone (NH)	95	233	388	567	640	0.20%	0.43%	0.66%	0.88%	0.95%
Native Hawaiian or Pacific Islander alone (NH)	x	x	10	30	23	x	x	0.02%	0.05%	0.03%
Other race alone (NH)	11	13	39	79	247	0.02%	0.02%	0.07%	0.12%	0.37%
Mixed race or Multiracial (NH)	x	x	401	870	2,323	x	x	0.69%	1.36%	3.45%
Hispanic or Latino (any race)	418	316	947	2,451	3,666	0.87%	0.58%	1.62%	3.83%	5.45%
Total	47,899	54,457	58,417	64,073	67,306	100.00%	100.00%	100.00%	100.00%	100.00%

=== 2020 census ===
As of the 2020 census, the county had a population of 67,306, 25,726 households, and 16,563 families.

The median age was 40.4 years. 22.6% of residents were under the age of 18 and 18.7% of residents were 65 years of age or older. For every 100 females there were 91.8 males, and for every 100 females age 18 and over there were 88.8 males age 18 and over. 59.3% of residents lived in urban areas, while 40.7% lived in rural areas.

The racial makeup of the county was 56.2% White, 34.6% Black or African American, 0.4% American Indian and Alaska Native, 1.0% Asian, 0.0% Native Hawaiian and Pacific Islander, 2.5% from some other race, and 5.3% from two or more races. Hispanic or Latino residents of any race comprised 5.4% of the population.

There were 25,726 households in the county, of which 31.0% had children under the age of 18 living with them and 33.0% had a female householder with no spouse or partner present. About 25.6% of all households were made up of individuals and 11.8% had someone living alone who was 65 years of age or older.

There were 27,785 housing units, of which 7.4% were vacant. Among occupied housing units, 61.3% were owner-occupied and 38.7% were renter-occupied. The homeowner vacancy rate was 1.8% and the rental vacancy rate was 5.3%.

== Education ==
The Griffin-Spalding County School District has 11 elementary schools, 4 middle schools, 2 high schools, and 4 complementary programs.

== Politics ==
Spalding County is solidly Republican at the presidential level having last voted for a Democrat in 1980 when it voted for Jimmy Carter. Since then, the closest a Democrat has come to winning Spalding County was in 1992, when Bill Clinton lost to George H. W. Bush by 5.6 percent. The county voted 58% for Donald Trump in 2024. For elections to the United States House of Representatives, Spalding County is part of Georgia's 3rd congressional district, currently represented by Brian Jack. For elections to the Georgia State Senate, Spalding County is part of District 16. For elections to the Georgia House of Representatives, Spalding County is divided between districts 82 and 135.

United States presidential election results for Spalding County, Georgia
Year	Republican		Democratic		Third party(ies)	
Year	No.	%	No.	%	No.	%
1912	26	3.22%	736	91.20%	45	5.58%
1916	41	3.99%	835	81.23%	152	14.79%
1920	181	17.90%	830	82.10%	0	0.00%
1924	75	5.28%	1,257	88.52%	88	6.20%
1928	412	19.20%	1,734	80.80%	0	0.00%
1932	54	2.40%	2,185	97.07%	12	0.53%
1936	36	1.44%	2,457	98.28%	7	0.28%
1940	197	6.11%	3,022	93.76%	4	0.12%
1944	217	7.18%	2,805	92.79%	1	0.03%
1948	506	10.94%	3,441	74.38%	679	14.68%
1952	1,249	19.08%	5,296	80.92%	0	0.00%
1956	1,458	23.10%	4,853	76.90%	0	0.00%
1960	1,753	28.37%	4,426	71.63%	0	0.00%
1964	4,763	46.56%	5,466	53.44%	0	0.00%
1968	3,077	28.03%	2,949	26.86%	4,953	45.11%
1972	7,183	80.84%	1,702	19.16%	0	0.00%
1976	3,739	33.00%	7,593	67.00%	0	0.00%
1980	4,809	39.00%	7,176	58.19%	346	2.81%
1984	8,571	63.73%	4,878	36.27%	0	0.00%
1988	7,730	63.68%	4,318	35.57%	90	0.74%
1992	7,262	46.15%	6,392	40.63%	2,080	13.22%
1996	7,376	50.74%	6,017	41.39%	1,143	7.86%
2000	9,271	60.24%	5,831	37.89%	289	1.88%
2004	13,461	63.99%	7,460	35.46%	115	0.55%
2008	14,885	58.85%	10,141	40.09%	269	1.06%
2012	14,911	59.31%	9,898	39.37%	330	1.31%
2016	15,646	60.58%	9,357	36.23%	823	3.19%
2020	18,104	59.91%	11,828	39.14%	287	0.95%
2024	19,184	58.07%	13,679	41.40%	175	0.53%

United States Senate election results for Spalding County, Georgia2
Year	Republican		Democratic		Third party(ies)	
Year	No.	%	No.	%	No.	%
2020	17,768	59.70%	11,355	38.15%	641	2.15%
2020	15,957	59.27%	10,966	40.73%	0	0.00%

United States Senate election results for Spalding County, Georgia3
Year	Republican		Democratic		Third party(ies)	
Year	No.	%	No.	%	No.	%
2020	9,759	32.84%	8,543	28.75%	11,412	38.41%
2020	18,057	67.88%	8,543	32.12%	0	0.00%
2022	13,966	53.13%	11,784	44.83%	535	2.04%
2022	12,625	58.65%	8,902	41.35%	0	0.00%

Georgia Gubernatorial election results for Spalding County
Year	Republican		Democratic		Third party(ies)	
Year	No.	%	No.	%	No.	%
2022	15,090	61.86%	9,146	37.49%	159	0.65%

== See also ==
- National Register of Historic Places listings in Spalding County, Georgia
- List of counties in Georgia
