= Jaclyn Ford =

American politician

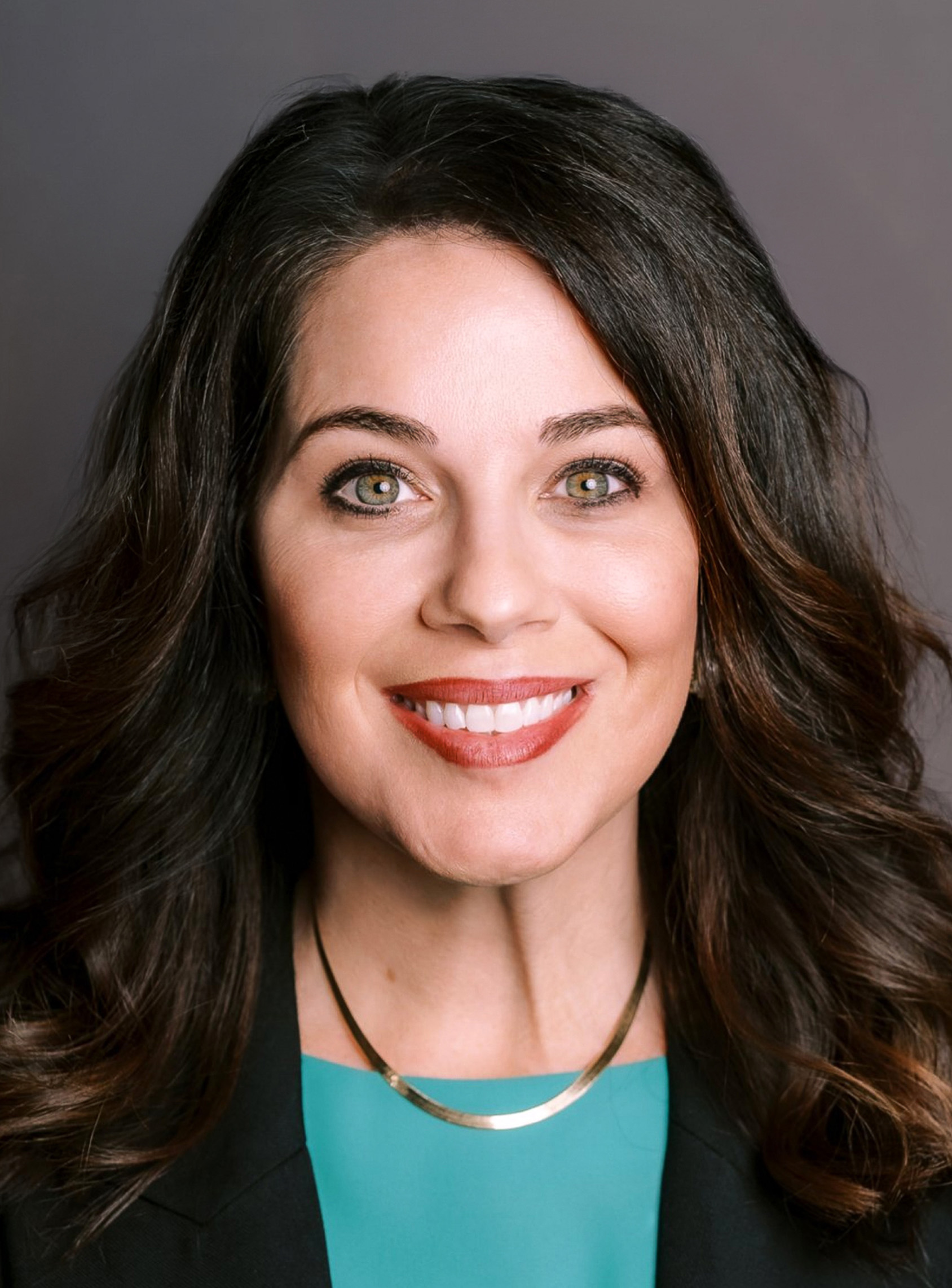
- Official headshot

Member of the Georgia House of Representatives from the 170th district
- Incumbent
- Assumed office January 13, 2025
- Preceded by: Penny Houston

Personal details
- Party: Republican
- Education: University of Georgia
- Website: https://jaclynforgeorgia.com/

Jaclyn Dixon Ford is an American politician who was elected member of the Georgia House of Representatives for the 170th district in 2024.

She was born and raised in Berrien County. As the co-owner of a family farm, she grows cotton, peanuts, corn, and pecans.
