= Spalding High School (Georgia) =

Public high school in Griffin, Georgia, United States

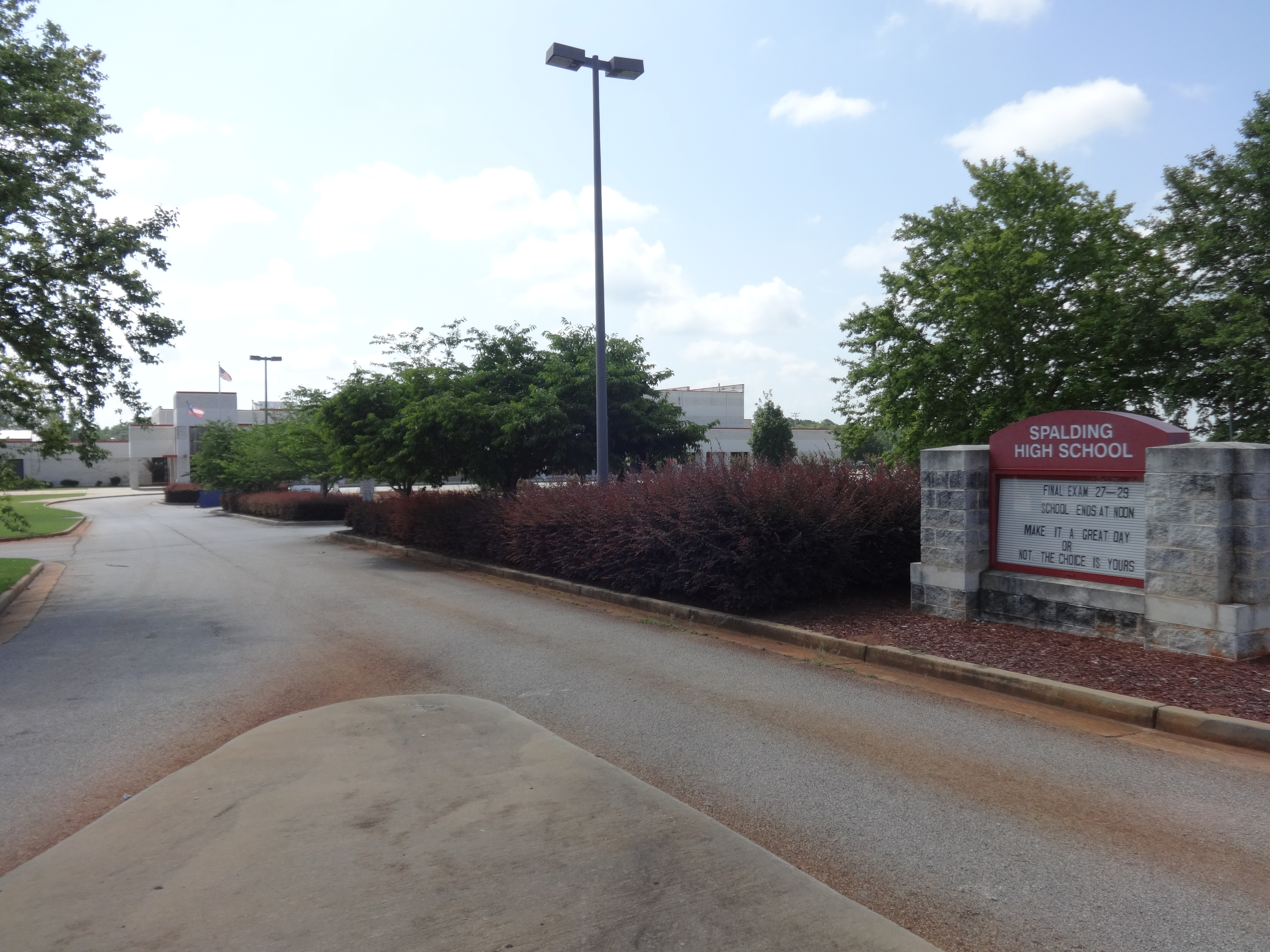

Location
- 433 Wilson Road; Griffin, Georgia 30224-4547; United States
- Coordinates: 33.227663°N 84.232763°W

Information
- School district: Griffin-Spalding County School District
- Principal: Dexter Sands
- Teaching staff: 75.60 FTE
- Grades: 9 - 12
- Enrollment: 1,209 (2023–2024)
- Student to teacher ratio: 15.99
- Colors: Navy and silver
- Mascot: Jaguar
- Team name: Jaguar
- Telephone: (770) 229-3775
- Fax: (770) 227-6899
- Website: Official website

Spalding High School is located in Griffin, Georgia, United States. It is part of the Griffin-Spalding County School System. Its mascot is a jaguar and the school colors are blue and silver.

This is the third Spalding County school to have this name. The first Spalding High was built in 1929 and opened in 1930. It was located on Spalding Street, near the Dixie Highway and west of the city of Griffin. In 1943, the original building burned. In 1945, the second Spalding High was built. The first two schools were part of the Spalding County School System. In 1953, the Griffin and Spalding County school systems merged. As a result of the consolidation, the second Spalding High was closed.

== Extra-curricular activities ==
Activities include:

- Football
- Softball
- Cross country
- One Act Plays
- SHS Chorus
- Literary Club
- Air rifle
- Cheerleading
- Basketball
- Baseball
- Wrestling
- Track and field
- Soccer
- Golf
- Tennis
- Academic Team
- Newspaper
- Beta Club
- Bogarsettes
- Bogarsuns
- DIMA Club
- FBLA
- FHA
- 4-H Club
- German Club
- Health Occupations Club
- Homecoming activities
- Future Problem Solvers
- Fellowship of Christian Students and Athletes
- Junior Classical League
- Key Club
- National Honors Society
- JROTC Color Guard
- JROTC Drill Team
- JROTC Raiders
- JROTC Rifle Team
- Science Club
- Math Team
- Student Council
- Dramatics and Thespians
- Y-Club
- Interact Club
- Swim Team
- SHS Band
- The Green Club
- Future Educators Association, aka Future Educators of America (FEA)
- FIRST Robotics

== Notable alumni ==
- Dee Alford, NFL cornerback for the Atlanta Falcons
- Trevor Reid, NFL offensive tackle for the Saskatchewan Roughriders
