= Sunny Side, Georgia =

- Census-designated place
- Location in Spalding County and the state of Georgia

- Location in Metro Atlanta
- Coordinates: 33°20′30″N 84°17′25″W
- Country: United States
- State: Georgia
- Counties: Spalding

Area
  - Total: 0.20 sq mi (0.52 km^{2})
  - Land: 0.20 sq mi (0.51 km^{2})
  - Water: 0.0039 sq mi (0.01 km^{2})

Population (2020)
  - Total: 203
  - Density: 1,028.2/sq mi (396.98/km^{2})
- FIPS code: 13-74572

Sunny Side is a census-designated place (CDP) and former city in Spalding County, Georgia, United States. The population was 203 in 2020.

== History ==
A post office called Sunny Side was established in 1871. The name "Sunny Side" was commendatorily applied to this place. The Georgia General Assembly incorporated Sunny Side as a town in 1897. Sunny Side was disincorporated in 2023.

== Geography ==
Sunny Side is located at 33°20′30″N 84°17′25″W (33.341724, -84.290254).

According to the United States Census Bureau, the city has a total area of 0.2 square mile (0.5 km^{2}), all land.

== Demographics ==
Historical population
Census	Pop.	Note	%±
1880	42		—
1930	136		—
1940	123		−9.6%
1950	169		37.4%
1960	190		12.4%
1970	209		10.0%
1980	338		61.7%
1990	215		−36.4%
2000	142		−34.0%
2010	134		−5.6%
2020	203		51.5%
U.S. Decennial Census; 1850-1870 1870-1880; 1890-1910 1920-1930; 1940 1950 1960; 1970 1980 1990; 2000 2010

As of the census of 2000, there were 142 people, 53 households, and 36 families residing in the city. By 2020, its population was 203.
