= East Griffin, Georgia =

- Unincorporated community Census-designated place
- Location in Spalding County and the state of Georgia
- Coordinates: 33°14′21″N 84°14′2″W
- Country: United States
- State: Georgia
- County: Spalding

Area
  - Total: 1.45 sq mi (3.76 km^{2})
  - Land: 1.43 sq mi (3.70 km^{2})
  - Water: 0.023 sq mi (0.06 km^{2})
- Elevation: 873 ft (266 m)

Population (2020)
  - Total: 1,561
  - Density: 1,092.4/sq mi (421.78/km^{2})
- Time zone: UTC-5 (Eastern (EST))
  - Summer (DST): UTC-4 (EDT)
- FIPS code: 13-25440
- GNIS feature ID: 0331620

East Griffin is an unincorporated community and census-designated place (CDP) in Spalding County, Georgia, United States. The population was 1,561 in 2020.

== Geography ==
East Griffin is located at 33°14′21″N 84°14′2″W (33.239156, -84.233786).

According to the United States Census Bureau, the CDP has a total area of 1.6 square miles (4.1 km^{2}), of which 1.5 square miles (3.9 km^{2}) is land and 0.64% is water.

== Demographics ==
Historical population
Census	Pop.	Note	%±
1950	1,539		—
1960	1,715		11.4%
1970	1,479		−13.8%
1980	1,570		6.2%
1990	1,569		−0.1%
2000	1,635		4.2%
2010	1,451		−11.3%
2020	1,561		7.6%
U.S. Decennial Census; 1850-1870 1870-1880; 1890-1910 1920-1930; 1940 1950 1960; 1970 1980 1990; 2000 2010 2020

East Griffin first appeared as an unincorporated place in the 1950 U.S. census and was designated a census designated place in the 1980 U.S. census.

=== Racial and ethnic composition ===
East Griffin, Georgia – Racial and ethnic composition Note: the US Census treats Hispanic/Latino as an ethnic category. This table excludes Latinos from the racial categories and assigns them to a separate category. Hispanics/Latinos may be of any race.
Race / Ethnicity (NH = Non-Hispanic)	Pop 2000	Pop 2010	Pop 2020	% 2000	% 2010	% 2020
White alone (NH)	1,362	967	959	83.30%	66.64%	61.43%
Black or African American alone (NH)	194	392	408	11.87%	27.02%	26.14%
Native American or Alaska Native alone (NH)	6	1	5	0.37%	0.07%	0.32%
Asian alone (NH)	7	0	3	0.43%	0.00%	0.19%
Pacific Islander alone (NH)	0	0	0	0.00%	0.00%	0.00%
Some Other Race alone (NH)	1	1	5	0.06%	0.07%	0.32%
Mixed Race or Multi-Racial (NH)	23	31	68	1.41%	2.14%	4.36%
Hispanic or Latino (any race)	42	59	113	2.57%	4.07%	7.24%
Total	1,635	1,451	1,561	100.00%	100.00%	100.00%

=== 2020 census ===
As of the 2020 census, East Griffin had a population of 1,561. The median age was 35.4 years. 25.2% of residents were under the age of 18 and 14.9% were 65 years of age or older. For every 100 females there were 92.7 males, and for every 100 females age 18 and over there were 90.4 males age 18 and over.

98.0% of residents lived in urban areas, while 2.0% lived in rural areas.

There were 555 households in East Griffin, of which 36.8% had children under the age of 18 living in them. Of all households, 34.2% were married-couple households, 19.8% were households with a male householder and no spouse or partner present, and 35.1% were households with a female householder and no spouse or partner present. About 24.7% of all households were made up of individuals and 10.9% had someone living alone who was 65 years of age or older.

There were 630 housing units, of which 11.9% were vacant. The homeowner vacancy rate was 4.9% and the rental vacancy rate was 2.7%.
