= Orchard Hill, Georgia =

- Town
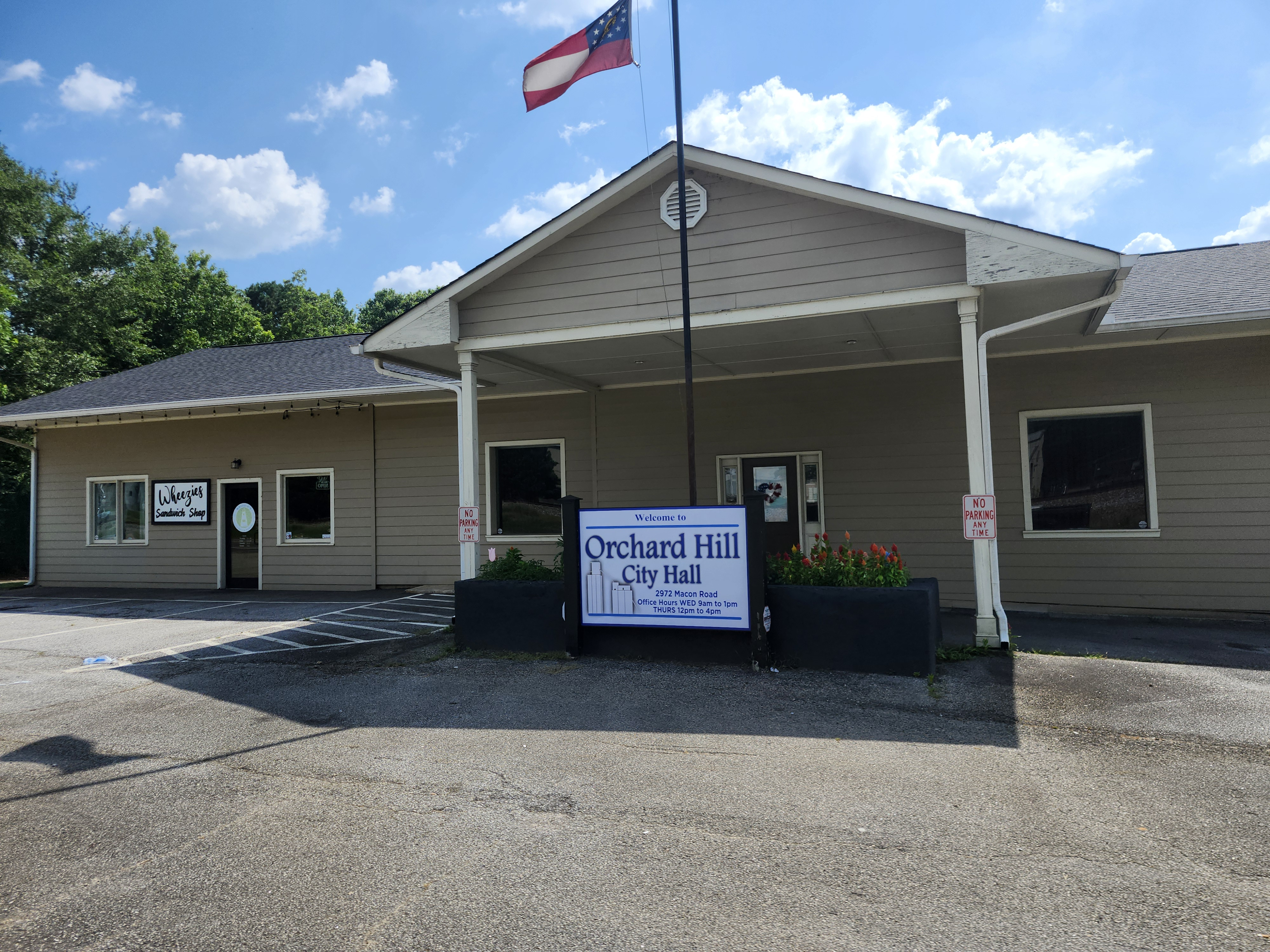
- Orchard Hill City Hall, July 2025

- Location in Spalding County and the state of Georgia
- Coordinates: 33°11′13″N 84°12′41″W
- Country: United States
- State: Georgia
- County: Spalding

Area
  - Total: 0.36 sq mi (0.93 km^{2})
  - Land: 0.36 sq mi (0.92 km^{2})
  - Water: 0.0039 sq mi (0.01 km^{2})
- Elevation: 860 ft (262 m)

Population (2020)
  - Total: 219
  - Density: 616.1/sq mi (237.87/km^{2})
- Time zone: UTC-5 (Eastern (EST))
  - Summer (DST): UTC-4 (EDT)
- ZIP code: 30266
- Area code: 770
- FIPS code: 13-58296
- GNIS feature ID: 0320094

Orchard Hill is a town in Spalding County, Georgia, United States. The population was 219 in 2020.

== History ==
Orchard Hill was named for the setting of the original town site. The Georgia General Assembly incorporated Orchard Hill as a town in 1912.

In 1946, a grain elevator was built in Orchard Hill, the first of the state. Today it's a prominent landmark in the city.

== Geography ==
Orchard Hill is located at 33°11′13″N 84°12′41″W (33.186853, -84.211379).

According to the United States Census Bureau, the town has a total area of 0.4 square miles (1.0 km^{2}), all land.

== Demographics ==
Historical population
Census	Pop.	Note	%±
1980	162		—
1990	239		47.5%
2000	230		−3.8%
2010	209		−9.1%
2020	219		4.8%
U.S. Decennial Census

As of the census of 2000, there were 230 people, 89 households, and 70 families residing in the town. By 2020, its population was 219.

== See also ==
- List of municipalities in Georgia (U.S. state)
