= Heron Bay, Georgia =

- Unincorporated community Census-designated place
- Location within Georgia Location within the United States
- Coordinates: 33°20′21″N 84°11′32″W
- Country: United States
- State: Georgia
- Counties: Henry, Spalding

Area
  - Total: 4.90 sq mi (12.68 km^{2})
  - Land: 4.51 sq mi (11.68 km^{2})
  - Water: 0.38 sq mi (0.99 km^{2})
- Elevation: 781 ft (238 m)

Population (2020)
  - Total: 4,679
  - Density: 1,037.2/sq mi (400.48/km^{2})
- Time zone: UTC-5 (Eastern (EST))
  - Summer (DST): UTC-4 (EDT)
- Area codes: 770/678/470
- GNIS feature ID: 2583405

Heron Bay is an unincorporated community and census-designated place (CDP) in Henry and Spalding counties in the U.S. state of Georgia. Its population was 4,679 as of the 2020 census.

== Demographics ==
Historical population
Census	Pop.	Note	%±
2010	3,384		—
2020	4,679		38.3%
U.S. Decennial Census; 1850-1870 1870-1880; 1890-1910 1920-1930; 1940 1950 1960; 1970 1980 1990; 2000 2010 2020

Heron Bay was first listed as a census designated place in the 2010 U.S. census.

=== Racial and ethnic composition ===
Heron Bay, Georgia – Racial and ethnic composition Note: the US Census treats Hispanic/Latino as an ethnic category. This table excludes Latinos from the racial categories and assigns them to a separate category. Hispanics/Latinos may be of any race.
Race / Ethnicity (NH = Non-Hispanic)	Pop 2010	Pop 2020	% 2010	% 2020
White alone (NH)	1,355	1,069	40.04%	22.85%
Black or African American alone (NH)	1,618	2,989	47.81%	63.88%
Native American or Alaska Native alone (NH)	5	7	0.15%	0.15%
Asian alone (NH)	89	105	2.63%	2.24%
Pacific Islander alone (NH)	5	3	0.15%	0.06%
Some Other Race alone (NH)	1	22	0.03%	0.47%
Mixed Race or Multi-Racial (NH)	76	139	2.25%	2.97%
Hispanic or Latino (any race)	235	345	6.94%	7.37%
Total	3,384	4,679	100.00%	100.00%

=== 2020 census ===
As of the 2020 census, Heron Bay had a population of 4,679. The median age was 40.6 years. 26.2% of residents were under the age of 18 and 13.2% of residents were 65 years of age or older. For every 100 females there were 90.0 males, and for every 100 females age 18 and over there were 87.7 males age 18 and over.

91.6% of residents lived in urban areas, while 8.4% lived in rural areas.

There were 1,493 households in Heron Bay, of which 40.3% had children under the age of 18 living in them. Of all households, 62.6% were married-couple households, 10.4% were households with a male householder and no spouse or partner present, and 22.8% were households with a female householder and no spouse or partner present. About 13.6% of all households were made up of individuals and 5.4% had someone living alone who was 65 years of age or older.

There were 1,569 housing units, of which 4.8% were vacant. The homeowner vacancy rate was 2.3% and the rental vacancy rate was 4.9%.
