= Alapaha, Georgia =

- Town
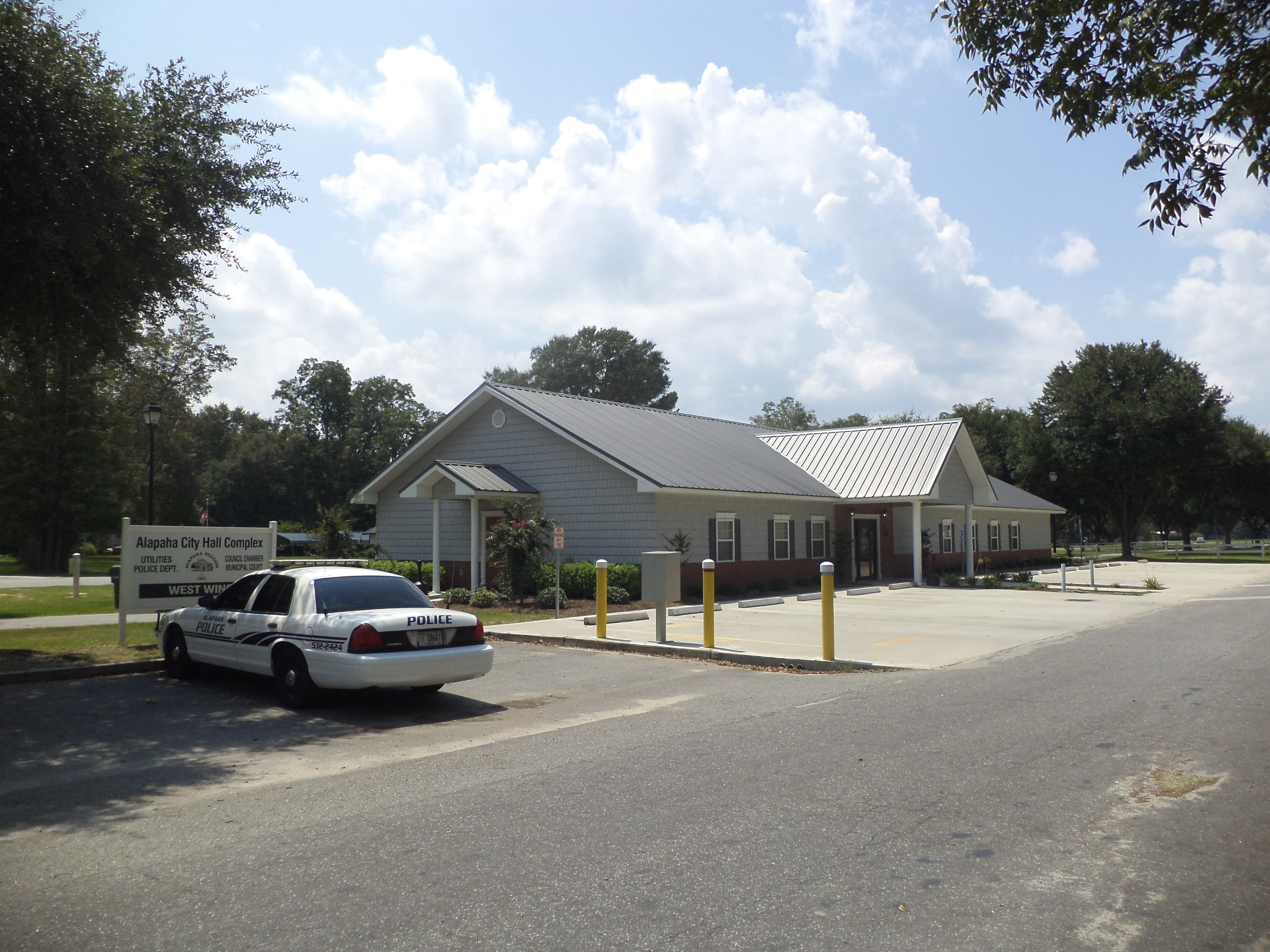
- Alapaha City Hall

- Location in Berrien County and the state of Georgia
- Coordinates: 31°22′56″N 83°13′26″W
- Country: United States
- State: Georgia
- County: Berrien

Area
  - Total: 1.03 sq mi (2.66 km^{2})
  - Land: 1.03 sq mi (2.66 km^{2})
  - Water: 0 sq mi (0.00 km^{2})
- Elevation: 285 ft (87 m)

Population (2020)
  - Total: 481
  - Density: 468/sq mi (180.8/km^{2})
- Time zone: UTC-5 (Eastern (EST))
  - Summer (DST): UTC-4 (EDT)
- ZIP code: 31622
- Area code: 229
- FIPS code: 13-01024
- GNIS feature ID: 0331009
- Website: https://www.townofalapaha.org/

Alapaha is a town in Berrien County, Georgia, United States, along the Alapaha River. As of the 2020 census, the city had a population of 481.

Alapaha developed from a trade settlement on the site of a Seminole village with the same name. The present-day Georgia town of Lakeland was originally named "Alapaha" and existed before the town that now bears the name.

== Etymology ==
The name "Alapaha" was included, along with hundreds of Native American words, in mid-19th-century pronunciation guides as both a river and a village. Even then, opinions differed as to the proper pronunciation of the word, whether it was "A-LAP-Uh-ha," or "A-LAP-uh-haw." These guides offer no speculation as to the word's meaning. There were many variant names, pronunciations, and spellings of the Alapaha River operant in the late 19th century.

Some ethnologists believe that "Alapaha" was the Creek word for "other side" (cf. Apalachee, Apalachicola); others believe it was the Timucua language word for "bear." At least one ethnolinguist believed that "Alapaha" is a Creek adaptation of the Timucuan word "arapaha" which meant "bear lodge." A Timucua town named Arapaha apparently gave its name to the river it was located on. Speakers of one or another of the Muscogean languages, which do not have the "r" sound, may have changed the pronunciation of the name from "Arapaha" to "Alapaha."

== History ==
=== Indian presence and early settlement ===
The Smithsonian Institution documented the presence of an Indian mound near Alapaha in 1886: "The Alapaha mound is situated 5 miles (8.0 km) northeast of the town of Alapaha, on Alapaha River, on lot of land No. 328, fifth district of Berrien County, Georgia. It is 38 feet (12 m) across, 6 feet (1.8 m) above the level, and somewhat oval in shape. In the center of the mound was a burial vault 6 feet (1.8 m) deep, 3 feet (0.91 m) wide, and 6 feet (1.8 m) long, north and south. Two bodies were deposited in this vault with the heads pointing south." It is possible that these remains became part of the Smithsonian collection, as was typical of its archaeological expeditions at the time. This source also gives the location and contents of two other Berrien County mounds south of Nashville, the Withlacoochee mound, and the French Ferry mound.

Early European settlers were primarily Highland Scots Methodist or Primitive Baptist, representing two socio-economic classes, "Jeffersonian yeomen" and a "squirearchy," two distinct divisions of landed farmers created by the Georgia Land Lottery of 1820. Between 1820 and 1840, agriculture was principally sheep and cattle herding. With the advent of railroad expansion in the 1830s a sizeable population of Irish Catholic laborers settled in and around the lower Alapaha River, eventually leading to the establishment of St. Anne's Catholic church there. Brushy Creek Primitive Baptist Church, originally in Irwin County, figured prominently in local affairs up to and after the Civil War. The Primitive Baptists often opposed the Methodist program of "benevolence" toward less fortunate citizens.

The town of Alapaha was established as a depot on the route of the Brunswick and Albany Railroad near where a road leading from Nashville, Georgia to Edenfield, Georgia crossed the Alapaha River. Early railroad maps refer to it as "Alapaha Station." It was in existence by at least 1874.

=== Boomtown years ===
The 1880s and 1890s brought an agricultural and industrial boom in forestry, timber, and naval stores. There were several sawmills in Alapaha by 1880, including "Alapaha Steam Saw Mills, established 16 years" which ran a weekly advertisement in the New York Times, boasting that Sloat, Bussell, & Co. were prepared to ship from Savannah or Brunswick "a Superior Article of Long leaf, close-grained, untapped Georgia Pitch Pine," guaranteed never to have been "injured" by turpentine extraction. Alapaha Steam Saw Mills listed its business addresses as 116 Wall Street, New York City, and 76 Bay Street, Savannah.

In 1881, Alapaha received prominent mention in a promotional pamphlet on the excellence of economic opportunity in South Georgia. The pamphlet was published "under the auspices" of the Savannah, Florida, and Western Railroad, the Brunswick and Albany Railroad, and the Macon & Brunswick Railroad, for the benefit of "Timber Men, Lumber Manufacturers, Fruit Growers, Vegetable Growers, Tourists, Invalids, Pleasure Seekers, Travellers, Parties Seeking New Homes, --and--All Who Desire To Better Their Condition." It devoted significant space to Alapaha, calling it "an important wool market," and "a lively and business-like little village," with "six stores with mixed stocks, and three bar-rooms." Its aggregate annual sales reached $100,000, and it had "two physicians, two lawyers, and one dentist" and "a sprightly newspaper." Calling it a "land of promise," the anonymous writer (probably a Mr. Lastinger who was the newspaper editor) wrote, "Bee culture is also carried on; the honey is as rich as that from California."

From the Macon Telegraph, March 24, 1886, in an article titled "At Alapaha. Her New Hotel. Her Clever Social People. Her Prosperous Merchants, Etc.,": "...a new hotel, two stories high, nicely fitted up and well kept. Dr. J.A. Fogle, one of the most clever men you would met in a week's hard riding, is the proprietor, but his time is mostly devoted to an extensive practice and to his well-stocked drug store. The hotel is presided over by Mrs. Fogle, a lady of refinement and most pleasant manner, ably assisted by her sister, Miss Fannie Leonard. The table is bountifully supplied with tempting fare, the sleeping apartments are models of cleanliness and comfort, and the attention to guests is prompt and courteous The commercial tourists are fond in their praise of it, and you know they are, generally speaking, a difficult set to please." This building is still intact, and is now a private home.

In the spring of 1897, a catastrophic fire destroyed four uninsured buildings in the downtown section of Alapaha. The Macon Telegraph reported that a bucket brigade of both black and white citizens worked to save the buildings, which had begun to burn after midnight. Lost were a store belonging to H.B. Young, a sewing machine repair business belonging to Mr. Norton, who managed to save his tools and materials, a two-story building owned by J.H. Baker, an old livery stable run by J.S. Turner, and a storehouse managed by W.S. Walker that contained 39 barrels (6.2 m^{3}) of wine, an iron safe, and books and papers. Two of the buildings were owned by a T. Cook. The paper reported that "the cause of the fire is not known, but the general opinion is that someone must have set it on fire."

=== 20th century to present ===
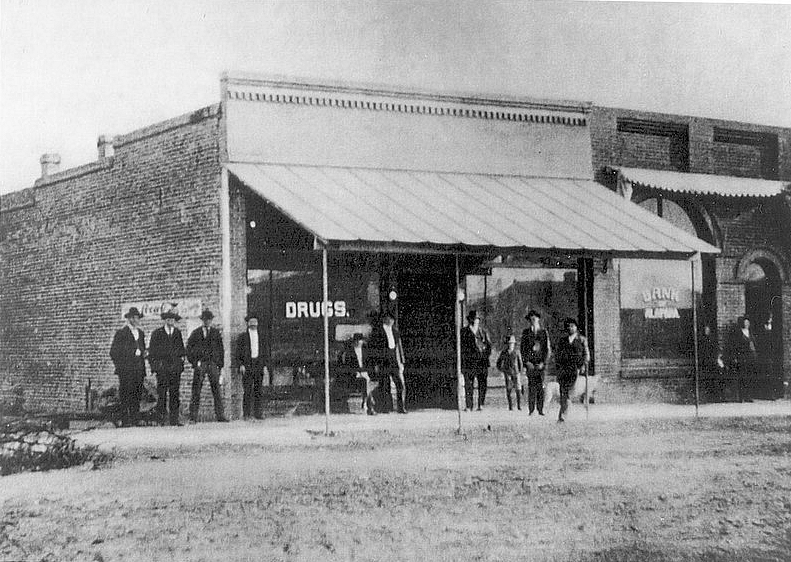
Street scene in Alapaha, circa 1910

The 1907 roster of the Georgia Medical Association lists two physicians from Alapaha, W.A. Moore and G.A. Paulk.

Alapaha was the site of a famous Atlantic Coast Line Railroad train wreck on March 26, 1911, when the Dixie Flyer derailed on a high trestle across the Alapaha River, killing ten and injuring many, including wealthy Northern socialites who were traveling to the coast.

On December 30, 1914, a patent application for a "portable shower-bath" with a detailed diagram was submitted by inventor Robert Alex Rutland of Alapaha, and witnessed by E.F. Tiller and W.M. Gaskins, local entrepreneurs. The patent was granted by the U.S. Patent Office on July 20, 1915.

On July 4, 1918, the Alapaha, a wooden paddle-wheeler Ferris-type cargo ship whose dead-weight tonnage was 3,500, registered in Cornwells Heights, Pennsylvania, was christened and launched. The ship routinely transported cargo such as coal between Philadelphia and the French cities of Rouen and Le Havre. The vessel was featured in a New York Tribune headline "Freighter in Distress," reported to be off the Atlantic Coast, "heavy seas breaking over her deck, her steam pipes were broken; her seams had opened up and several feet of water were in her hold." The freighter survived, only to meet with delays during the marine workers' union strikes of 1919.

Alapaha lost four men (of 25 total from Berrien County) in the infamous Otranto troopship disaster off the coast of Scotland, eight weeks before the Armistice ended World War I. Their names and hometowns were published among 200 dead in the New York Times coverage. They were James Malcolm McMillan, Arthur Harper, William Hayes, and B.F. McCranie.

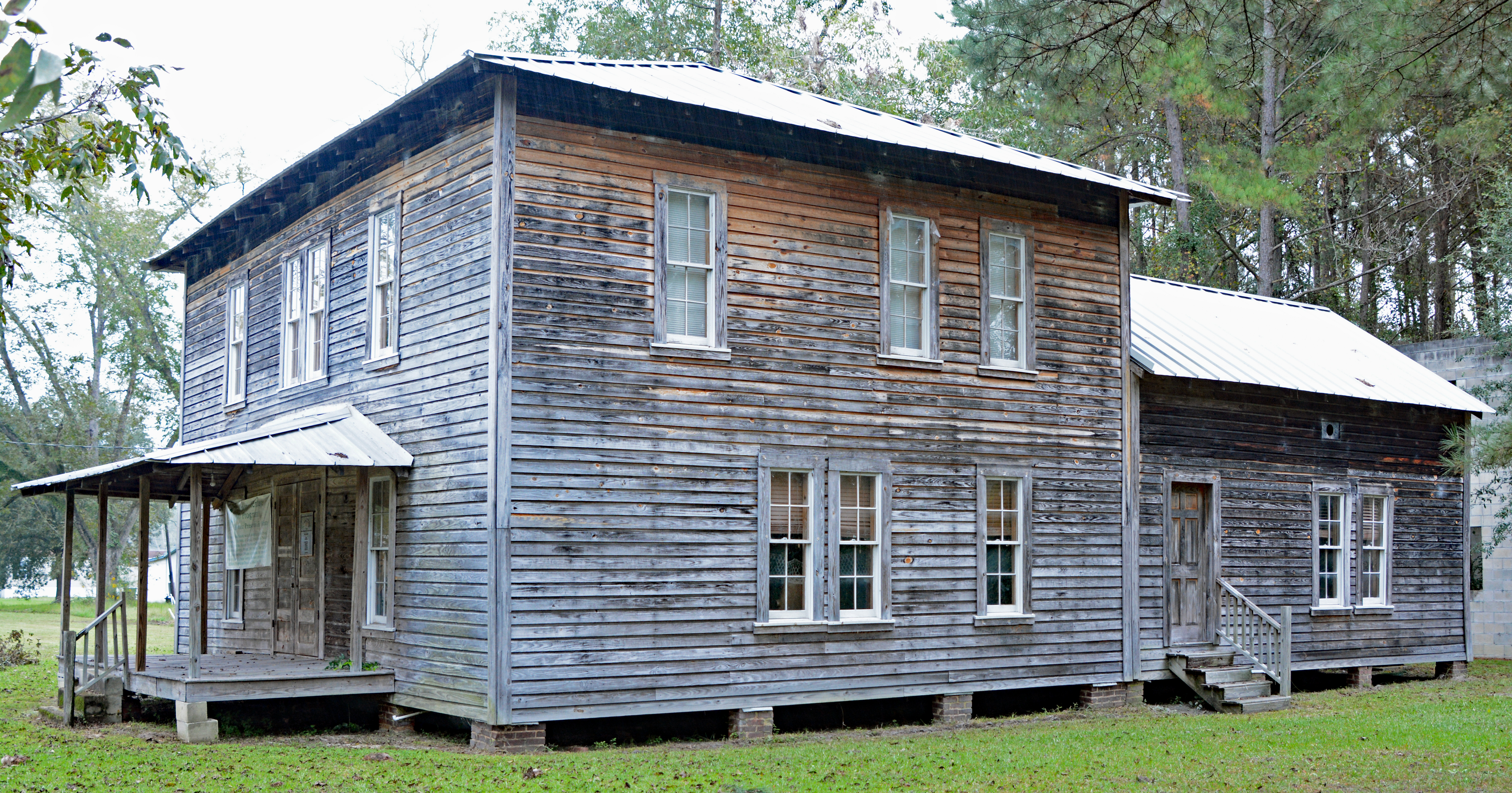
The Alapaha Colored School, on the National Register of Historic Places

The Alapaha Colored School, one of the historic place listings in Berrien County, was the only school for African American children in the northern part of the county for three decades, starting in 1924. Atypical for rural Georgia, it had four classrooms and two stories, accommodating boys and girls in eleven grades; it closed in 1954 when Berrien County's African American schools were consolidated in Nashville.

A tornado on May 11, 1952, led to national headlines. The business area of the town was decimated and the water tower was smashed. The Red Cross set up field operations, bringing in a director from Moody Air Force Base and a mobile kitchen from Fort Benning.

In 1963, the U.S. Department of Labor won a lawsuit, Wirtz v. Alapaha Yellow Pine Products, Inc., against a locally owned sawmill. At issue were Fair Labor Standards Act violations concerning overtime pay. The case became a minor landmark in labor litigation history; the case is frequently cited as a precedent for denying defendants in similar suits to have their cases heard by a jury.

On October 3, 1966, Army Master Sgt. James Emory Jones of Alapaha, one of the first members of the elite Military Assistance Command, Vietnam Studies and Observations Group (MAC-SOG), a black-operations unit of the Vietnam War, was killed in a secret attempt to wire-tap North Vietnamese communications lines in Laos. The existence of this secret unit was concealed for many years, as well as its operations outside borders of Vietnam. Jones's entire three-man commando unit was lost; evidence suggests that the unit requested U.S. bombers fire upon its coordinates when they knew they could not escape ambush. Jones's fate and place of death were kept secret for many years, and he was listed as "missing in action" for over two decades.

The 1996 novel The Wonder Book of the Air (ISBN 067943982X) by Cynthia Shearer is set in Alapaha and includes much of the town's history.

Just outside the town is the site where the famous "Hogzilla," a "wild" hog weighing in at about 800 pounds (360 kg), was shot on June 17, 2004, on a commercial hunting farm. The carcass of the hog was exhumed for a National Geographic special.

== Geography ==
According to the United States Census Bureau, the town has a total area of 1.0 square mile (2.6 km^{2}), all land.

=== Climate ===
The climate in this area is characterized by relatively high temperatures and evenly distributed precipitation throughout the year. According to the Köppen Climate Classification system, Alapaha has a humid subtropical climate, abbreviated "Cfa" on climate maps.

Climate data for Alapaha, Georgia
Month	Jan	Feb	Mar	Apr	May	Jun	Jul	Aug	Sep	Oct	Nov	Dec	Year
Mean daily maximum °F (°C)	63.2 (17.3)	64.9 (18.3)	71.4 (21.9)	78.7 (25.9)	85.8 (29.9)	90.7 (32.6)	91.7 (33.2)	91.7 (33.2)	88.3 (31.3)	80.5 (26.9)	71.0 (21.7)	63.7 (17.6)	78.5 (25.8)
Mean daily minimum °F (°C)	39.3 (4.1)	40.9 (4.9)	46.8 (8.2)	53.5 (11.9)	61.2 (16.2)	67.8 (19.9)	70.1 (21.2)	69.8 (21.0)	65.9 (18.8)	55.0 (12.8)	44.7 (7.1)	39.5 (4.2)	54.6 (12.6)
Average precipitation inches (mm)	3.7 (94)	4.4 (110)	4.5 (110)	3.7 (94)	3.8 (97)	4.8 (120)	5.8 (150)	5.3 (130)	4.1 (100)	2.1 (53)	1.8 (46)	3.8 (97)	47.8 (1,210)
Source: Weatherbase

== Demographics ==
Historical population
Census	Pop.	Note	%±
1880	157		—
1890	449		186.0%
1900	429		−4.5%
1910	532		24.0%
1920	503		−5.5%
1930	270		−46.3%
1940	494		83.0%
1950	505		2.2%
1960	631		25.0%
1970	633		0.3%
1980	771		21.8%
1990	812		5.3%
2000	682		−16.0%
2010	668		−2.1%
2020	481		−28.0%
U.S. Decennial Census; 1850-1870 1880; 1890-1910 1920-1930; 1930-1940 1940-1950; 1960-1980 1980-2000; 2010 2020

=== Racial and ethnic composition ===
Alapaha town, Georgia – Racial and ethnic composition Note: the US Census treats Hispanic/Latino as an ethnic category. This table excludes Latinos from the racial categories and assigns them to a separate category. Hispanics/Latinos may be of any race.
Race / Ethnicity (NH = Non-Hispanic)	Pop 2000	Pop 2010	Pop 2020	% 2000	% 2010	% 2020
White alone (NH)	248	233	168	36.36%	34.88%	34.93%
Black or African American alone (NH)	428	407	259	62.76%	60.93%	53.85%
Native American or Alaska Native alone (NH)	1	1	0	0.15%	0.15%	0.00%
Asian alone (NH)	0	1	0	0.00%	0.15%	0.00%
Native Hawaiian or Pacific Islander alone (NH)	0	0	1	0.00%	0.00%	0.21%
Other race alone (NH)	0	0	0	0.00%	0.00%	0.00%
Mixed race or Multiracial (NH)	5	3	43	0.73%	0.45%	8.94%
Hispanic or Latino (any race)	0	23	10	0.00%	3.44%	2.08%
Total	682	668	481	100.00%	100.00%	100.00%

=== 2010 census ===
In 2010, its population was 668, though by 2020 its population had declined to 481.

== Government ==
Alapaha was incorporated in 1881 by an act (Law #433) of the General Assembly of the Georgia legislature. That act set forth the framework for its municipal government, specifying that there be a mayor, aldermen, regular elections, taxes, licensing of "ten-pin alleys, billiard and pool tables, and other establishments calculated to encourage idleness" as well as "spiritous liquors." The corporate limits of the town were set at a quarter-mile from the junction of Main and Center streets in every direction.

In its entire history, the town has only grown ¾ of a square mile, despite early efforts to promote it for development.

Alapaha's city hall is located in the former depot that once served the Brunswick and Albany Railroad, the Atlantic Coast Line Railroad, and the Seaboard Coast Line Railroad.

== In popular culture ==
The Alapaha Blue Blood Bulldog breed was developed from the Paulk plantation dogs of the area. They were first registered with the Animal Research Foundation by Lana Lou Lane of Rebecca, Georgia in 1986. She gave the breed the name because the Alapaha River ran near her home.

The Alapaha blueberry is a patented rabbiteye blueberry named for the Alapaha River, and tested at Alapaha. Its berries are medium in size and have excellent firmness, color and flavor.

"The Alapaha Blues (The Catfish Dance)" is a song by Brian Buffington.
