= Berrien County, Georgia =

County in Georgia, United States

- County
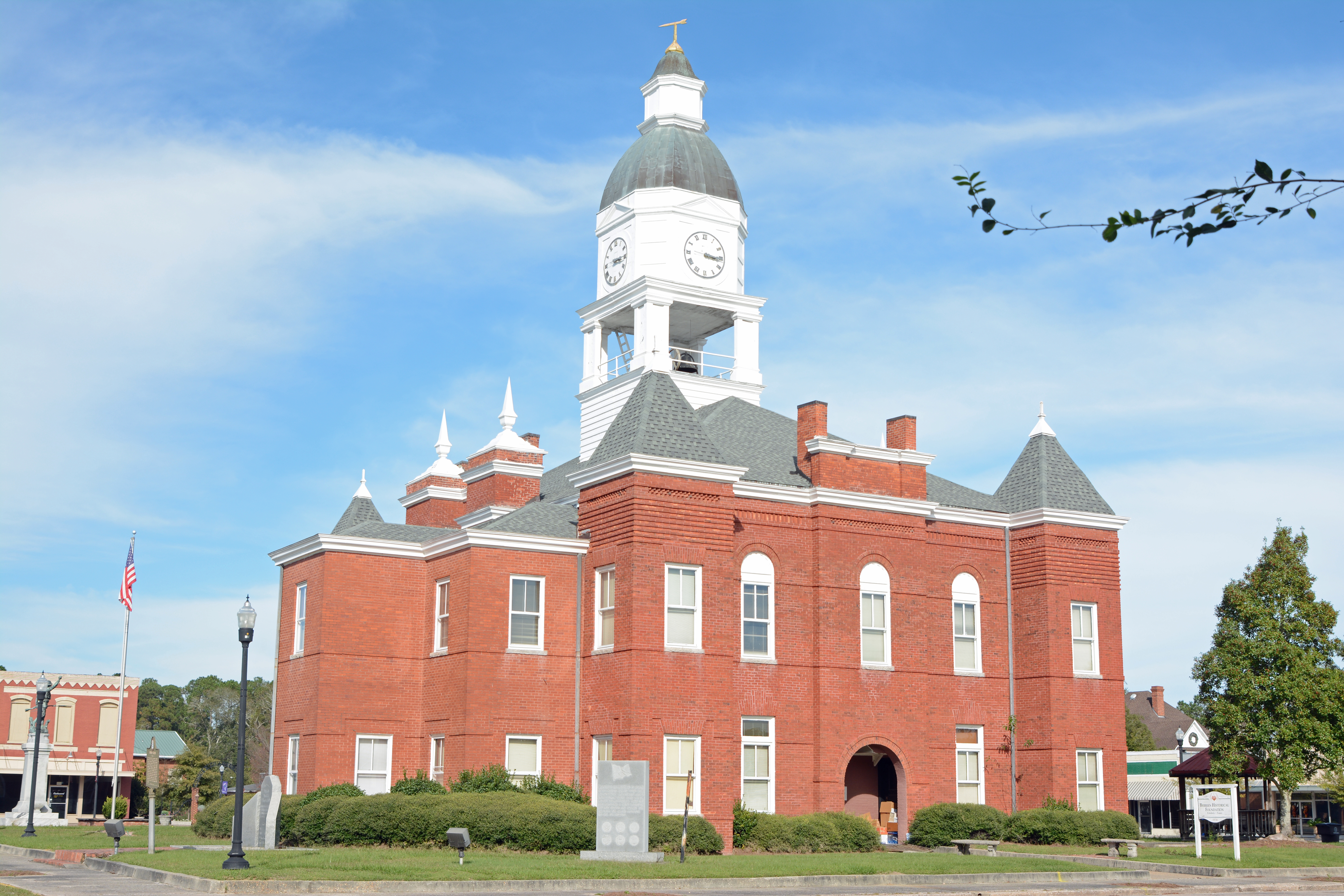
- Berrien County courthouse in Nashville

- Seal

- Location within the U.S. state of Georgia
- Coordinates: 31°16′N 83°14′W
- Country: United States
- State: Georgia
- Founded: 1856; 170 years ago
- Named for: John M. Berrien
- Seat: Nashville
- Largest city: Nashville

Area
  - Total: 458 sq mi (1,190 km^{2})
  - Land: 452 sq mi (1,170 km^{2})
  - Water: 6.0 sq mi (16 km^{2}) 1.3%

Population (2020)
  - Total: 18,160
  - Estimate (2025): 18,932 ▲
  - Density: 40/sq mi (15/km^{2})
- Time zone: UTC−5 (Eastern)
  - Summer (DST): UTC−4 (EDT)
- Congressional district: 8th
- Website: www.berriencountygeorgia.com

Berrien County is a county located in the south central portion of the U.S. state of Georgia. As of the 2020 census, the population was 18,160. The county seat is Nashville. The county was created February 25, 1856, out of portions of Coffee, Irwin and Lowndes counties by an act of the Georgia General Assembly. It is named after Georgia senator John M. Berrien.

== History ==
=== Establishment ===
The citizens of the area of Lowndes County and Irwin County that would become Berrien County had to travel long distances to get the county courthouse at Franklinville, Georgia and later Troupville, Georgia for those in Lowndes County, and Irwinville, Georgia for those in Irwin County. By at least June 1853, citizens had petitioned to form a new county. The 1853 attempt of a new county failed. By 1856, a renewed attempt at the creation of a new county was successful.

=== World War I ===
Berrien County lost a disproportionate number of men in World War I in part because companies at that time were organized by militia districts at home. Eight weeks before the Armistice, 25 Berrien County men were among the 200 recently enlisted soldiers who perished at sea off the coast of Scotland. Many of the bodies were returned to the soldiers' hometowns for burial, and the names of the dead were engraved on a memorial located on the courthouse grounds in Nashville. The memorial was the first in a series of pressed copper sculptures by artist E. M. Viquesney entitled The Spirit of the American Doughboy.

== Geography ==
According to the U.S. Census Bureau, the county has a total area of 458 square miles (1,190 km^{2}), of which 452 square miles (1,170 km^{2}) is land and 6.0 square miles (16 km^{2}) (1.3%) is water.

The western portion of Berrien County, from just north of U.S. Route 82 and roughly west of U.S. Route 129 heading south, is located in the Withlacoochee River sub-basin of the Suwannee River basin. The eastern portion of the county is located in the Alapaha River sub-basin of the larger Suwannee River basin.

=== Major highways ===
- U.S. Route 82 / State Route 520
- U.S. Route 129 / State Route 11
- State Route 37
- State Route 64
- State Route 76
- State Route 125
- State Route 135
- State Route 158
- State Route 168

=== Adjacent counties ===
- Irwin County - north
- Coffee County - northeast
- Atkinson County - east
- Lanier County - southeast
- Lowndes County - south
- Cook County - west
- Tift County - northwest

=== Communities ===
==== Cities ====
- Nashville
- Ray City

==== Towns ====
- Alapaha
- Enigma

==== Unincorporated communities ====
- Allenville
- Bannockburn
- Cottle
- Gladys
- Glory
- New Lois
- Utopia
- Weber

==== Extinct communities ====
- Avera Mill
- Baker's Sawmill
- Brewer's Mill
- Flat Creek Mills
- Rowetown
- White Station

== Demographics ==
Historical population
Census	Pop.	Note	%±
1860	3,475		—
1870	4,518		30.0%
1880	6,619		46.5%
1890	10,694		61.6%
1900	19,440		81.8%
1910	22,722		16.9%
1920	15,573		−31.5%
1930	14,646		−6.0%
1940	15,370		4.9%
1950	13,966		−9.1%
1960	12,038		−13.8%
1970	11,556		−4.0%
1980	13,525		17.0%
1990	14,153		4.6%
2000	16,235		14.7%
2010	19,286		18.8%
2020	18,160		−5.8%
2025 (est.)	18,932	▲	4.3%
U.S. Decennial Census; 1790-1880 1890-1910; 1920-1930 1930-1940; 1940-1950 1960-1980; 1980-2000 2010

=== Racial and ethnic composition ===
Berrien County, Georgia – Racial and ethnic composition Note: the US Census treats Hispanic/Latino as an ethnic category. This table excludes Latinos from the racial categories and assigns them to a separate category. Hispanics/Latinos may be of any race.
Race / Ethnicity (NH = Non-Hispanic)	Pop 1980	Pop 1990	Pop 2000	Pop 2010	Pop 2020	% 1980	% 1990	% 2000	% 2010	% 2020
White alone (NH)	11,719	12,178	13,761	16,050	14,396	86.65%	86.05%	84.76%	83.22%	79.27%
Black or African American alone (NH)	1,649	1,642	1,843	2,040	1,934	12.19%	11.60%	11.35%	10.58%	10.65%
Native American or Alaska Native alone (NH)	10	27	42	44	22	0.07%	0.19%	0.26%	0.23%	0.12%
Asian alone (NH)	20	29	47	82	80	0.15%	0.20%	0.29%	0.43%	0.44%
Native Hawaiian or Pacific Islander alone (NH)	x	x	13	3	10	x	x	0.08%	0.02%	0.06%
Other race alone (NH)	15	0	14	8	62	0.11%	0.00%	0.09%	0.04%	0.34%
Mixed race or Multiracial (NH)	x	x	131	174	611	x	x	0.81%	0.90%	3.36%
Hispanic or Latino (any race)	112	277	384	885	1,045	0.83%	1.96%	2.37%	4.59%	5.75%
Total	13,525	14,153	16,235	19,286	18,160	100.00%	100.00%	100.00%	100.00%	100.00%

=== 2020 census ===
As of the 2020 census, the county had a population of 18,160 and 5,055 families. Of the residents, 24.6% were under the age of 18 and 17.6% were 65 years of age or older; the median age was 39.9 years. For every 100 females there were 96.3 males, and for every 100 females age 18 and over there were 93.0 males. 26.7% of residents lived in urban areas and 73.3% lived in rural areas.

The racial makeup of the county was 80.6% White, 10.8% Black or African American, 0.2% American Indian and Alaska Native, 0.4% Asian, 0.1% Native Hawaiian and Pacific Islander, 2.6% from some other race, and 5.3% from two or more races. Hispanic or Latino residents of any race comprised 5.8% of the population.

There were 7,118 households in the county, of which 32.0% had children under the age of 18 living with them and 26.8% had a female householder with no spouse or partner present. About 26.9% of all households were made up of individuals and 12.5% had someone living alone who was 65 years of age or older.

There were 7,991 housing units, of which 10.9% were vacant. Among occupied housing units, 68.5% were owner-occupied and 31.5% were renter-occupied. The homeowner vacancy rate was 1.0% and the rental vacancy rate was 8.7%.

=== 2022 American Community Survey ===
According to the American Community Survey in 2022, its median household income was $48,670 with a per capita income of $25,100. Approximately 51% of its population made less than $50,000 a year; 30% from $50,000-100,000; 17% from $100,000-200,000; and 2% more than $200,000 annually. Of the county, 23.2% lived at or below the poverty line, and an estimated 30% of children under 18 years of age were at or below the poverty line. The median value of owner-occupied housing units was $108,300.

=== Religion ===
The Association of Religion Data Archives in 2020 denoted the largest religion in the area is Christianity. The largest Christian groups within the county are Baptists and non or interdenominational Protestants, followed by Methodists and Pentecostals. Within Berrien County, the largest single Christian denomination as of 2020 has been the Southern Baptist Convention.

== Politics ==
United States presidential election results for Berrien County, Georgia
Year	Republican		Democratic		Third party(ies)	
Year	No.	%	No.	%	No.	%
1912	70	8.60%	709	87.10%	35	4.30%
1916	49	2.24%	2,102	96.29%	32	1.47%
1920	58	8.52%	623	91.48%	0	0.00%
1924	13	3.01%	409	94.68%	10	2.31%
1928	105	12.50%	735	87.50%	0	0.00%
1932	19	1.28%	1,447	97.44%	19	1.28%
1936	53	3.02%	1,700	96.98%	0	0.00%
1940	23	1.95%	1,156	97.97%	1	0.08%
1944	217	12.78%	1,481	87.22%	0	0.00%
1948	107	5.03%	1,772	83.31%	248	11.66%
1952	364	14.27%	2,187	85.73%	0	0.00%
1956	165	6.44%	2,398	93.56%	0	0.00%
1960	368	11.66%	2,787	88.34%	0	0.00%
1964	4,073	60.51%	2,658	39.49%	0	0.00%
1968	566	14.79%	452	11.81%	2,810	73.41%
1972	2,285	86.03%	371	13.97%	0	0.00%
1976	555	14.05%	3,394	85.95%	0	0.00%
1980	1,487	33.76%	2,869	65.15%	48	1.09%
1984	2,395	58.92%	1,670	41.08%	0	0.00%
1988	2,030	59.36%	1,381	40.38%	9	0.26%
1992	1,637	36.03%	2,103	46.29%	803	17.68%
1996	1,950	42.87%	2,066	45.42%	533	11.72%
2000	2,718	61.63%	1,640	37.19%	52	1.18%
2004	3,917	69.87%	1,638	29.22%	51	0.91%
2008	4,901	75.95%	1,471	22.80%	81	1.26%
2012	4,843	77.81%	1,273	20.45%	108	1.74%
2016	5,422	81.99%	1,047	15.83%	144	2.18%
2020	6,419	82.89%	1,269	16.39%	56	0.72%
2024	6,841	84.79%	1,209	14.99%	18	0.22%

United States Senate election results for Berrien County, Georgia2
Year	Republican		Democratic		Third party(ies)	
Year	No.	%	No.	%	No.	%
2020	6,286	82.17%	1,204	15.74%	160	2.09%
2020	5,538	82.92%	1,141	17.08%	0	0.00%

United States Senate election results for Berrien County, Georgia3
Year	Republican		Democratic		Third party(ies)	
Year	No.	%	No.	%	No.	%
2020	3,318	43.86%	701	9.27%	3,546	46.87%
2020	5,539	82.87%	1,145	17.13%	0	0.00%
2022	5,002	83.51%	909	15.18%	79	1.32%
2022	4,706	84.81%	843	15.19%	0	0.00%

Georgia Gubernatorial election results for Berrien County
Year	Republican		Democratic		Third party(ies)	
Year	No.	%	No.	%	No.	%
2022	5,209	86.54%	772	12.83%	38	0.63%

As of the 2020s, Berrien County is a Republican stronghold, voting 84.8% for Donald Trump in 2024. For elections to the United States House of Representatives, Berrien County is part of Georgia's 8th congressional district, currently represented by Austin Scott. For elections to the Georgia State Senate, Berrien County is part of District 13. For elections to the Georgia House of Representatives, Berrien County is part of District 170, currently represented by Jaclyn Ford.

== Education ==
All residents of the county are in the Berrien County School District.

== See also ==
- National Register of Historic Places listings in Berrien County, Georgia
- List of counties in Georgia
