= 2008 United States presidential election in Georgia =

- November 4, 2008
- Turnout: 51.8% ▼5 pp

| Nominee | John McCain | Barack Obama |
| Party | Republican | Democratic |
| Home state | Arizona | Illinois |
| Running mate | Sarah Palin | Joe Biden |
| Electoral vote | 15 | 0 |
| Popular vote | 2,048,759 | 1,844,123 |
| Percentage | 52.20% | 46.99% |

McCain
40–50%
50–60%
60–70%
70–80%
80–90%
90–100%
Obama
40–50%
50–60%
60–70%
70–80%
80–90%
90–100%
Tie/No Data
President before election
George W. Bush
Republican
Elected President
Barack Obama
Democratic

The 2008 United States presidential election in Georgia took place on November 4, 2008. Voters chose 15 representatives, or electors to the Electoral College, who voted for president and vice president.

Georgia was won by Republican nominee John McCain with a 5.2% margin of victory. Prior to the election, 15 of 17 news organizations considered this a state McCain would win, or otherwise a red state. It is situated in the Deep South, entrenched in the Bible Belt (the city of Atlanta being an exception). By 2008 it was considered a Republican stronghold, not having been won by a Democratic presidential candidate since 1992, and having given double-digit victories to George W. Bush in 2000 and 2004. Georgia voted against George H. W. Bush in 1992 and Donald Trump in 2020 by less than 1%. McCain was able to keep Georgia in the GOP column in 2008 despite the large African American turnout that helped keep his margin of victory within single digits.

In this election, Georgia voted 12.48% to the right of the nation at-large.

Georgia was one of only two states that voted against Obama in both 2008 and 2012 that his vice president Joe Biden would go on to win in 2020, the other being Arizona.

With its 15 electoral votes, Georgia was the second-largest prize for McCain in 2008, behind only Texas. As of the 2024 presidential election, this is the last election in which Chattahoochee County voted Democratic.

== Primaries ==
- Georgia Democratic primary, 2008
- Georgia Republican primary, 2008

== Campaign ==
An ambitious Barack Obama targeted Georgia as a potential state he could flip from red to blue, albeit as a relatively long-shot target. Democrats hoped libertarian candidate Bob Barr – whose home state was Georgia – might take away votes for John McCain and play the role of a spoiler. In the early months, Obama bought ads and even appeared in person to campaign in the state.

However, polling consistently showed McCain with a double-digit lead. Over the summer, Obama's campaign stumbled, and the Illinois senator even fell behind McCain for a short while in September. In light of these difficulties, the Democratic campaign started shifting resources to North Carolina, which they regarded as more competitive. Obama stopped advertising in the state and moved away staff, although he retained a large volunteer force. As the campaign neared the end, Obama jumped to a national lead, helped by the September financial crisis, but remained behind in Georgia polling.

=== Predictions ===
There were 16 news organizations who made state-by-state predictions of the election. Here are their last predictions before election day:

| Source | Ranking |
|---|---|
| D.C. Political Report | Likely R |
| Cook Political Report | Toss-up |
| The Takeaway | Lean R |
| Electoral-vote.com | Lean R |
| Washington Post | Lean R |
| Politico | Solid R |
| RealClearPolitics | Toss-up |
| FiveThirtyEight | Lean R |
| CQ Politics | Lean R |
| The New York Times | Lean R |
| CNN | Lean R |
| NPR | Lean R |
| MSNBC | Lean R |
| Fox News | Likely R |
| Associated Press | Likely R |
| Rasmussen Reports | Safe R |

=== Polling ===
McCain won almost every pre-election poll. The final 3 poll average gave the Republican the lead with 50% to 47%.

=== Fundraising ===
McCain raised $4,835,902. Obama raised $8,568,716.

=== Advertising and visits ===
Obama spent over $4,105,888. McCain and his interest groups spent just $49,507. Both McCain and Obama visited Atlanta once.

== Analysis ==
McCain won 52.2% of the popular vote to Democrat Barack Obama's 46.99% popular vote, a margin of 5.21%. This was significantly lower than that in 2004, when George W. Bush carried this state by a 17% margin, winning 58% of the popular vote to John Kerry's 41%. Obama won huge victories in the two most populous counties, DeKalb County and Fulton County which contains the state capital and largest city of Atlanta, which contributed to his popular vote percentage. He also made significant inroads in Atlanta's normally heavily Republican suburbs. For instance, Obama lost Cobb County by nine points compared to Kerry's 25-point loss. Obama lost Gwinnett County by 11 points compared to a 33-point loss for Kerry. Aside from native son Jimmy Carter sweeping every county in the state in 1976, a Democrat hadn't won either county since 1960, and would not do so until Hillary Clinton in 2016. However, McCain piled up the votes in the more rural northern and southeastern parts of the state (well over 70% in some cases) which gave him the edge and ultimate win. These two areas were among the first regions of Georgia to turn Republican; the old-line Southern Democrats in these areas began splitting their tickets as early as the 1950s, and some areas of north Georgia are among the few ancestrally Republican areas of the South. Webster County in the southwest of the state flipped to McCain, making Obama the first Democrat to win the White House without carrying the county.

The large African American turnout was widely attributed to the narrower margin by which McCain carried the state. However, Obama was unable to improve his percentage amongst white voters. According to exit polls, 77% of white voters supported the Republican candidate - the same as in 2004. This effectively eliminated Obama's chances of winning the state.

Of the several independent and third-party candidates who ran for president in 2008, two were from Georgia: former Republican Representative Bob Barr running on the Libertarian Party (who placed third overall in the popular vote in Georgia), and former Democratic Representative Cynthia McKinney running on the Green Party.

During the same election, incumbent Republican U.S. Senator Saxby Chambliss was held below 50% of the popular vote in a contentious U.S. Senate race against Democrat Jim Martin and Libertarian Allen Buckley. Abiding by Georgia law, this led to a runoff election in December between Chambliss and Martin. Chambliss brought in 2008 vice presidential nominee Governor Sarah Palin of Alaska to campaign for him and rally the base of the GOP. Former President Bill Clinton campaigned on behalf of Martin. Turnout was lower than in the general election and African Americans didn't turn out as large as they did in November for Obama, all factors that led up to Chambliss's victory. The incumbent was reelected with 57.44% of the vote while Martin received 42.56%.

During the 2008 U.S. House elections, incumbent Democratic Representatives Jim Marshall (GA-8) and John Barrow (GA-12), each of whom was narrowly re-elected by 1% or less in 2006 despite the pro-Democratic political environment that year, were both re-elected by unexpectedly wide margins despite efforts by Republicans to win both of the districts. At the state level, during the same election, Republicans picked up four seats in the Georgia House of Representatives.

== Results ==
United States presidential election in Georgia, 2008
| Party | Candidate | Running mate | Votes | Percentage | Electoral votes |
|---|---|---|---|---|---|
| Republican | John McCain | Sarah Palin | 2,048,759 | 52.10% | 15 |
| Democratic | Barack Obama | Joe Biden | 1,844,123 | 46.90% | 0 |
| Libertarian | Bob Barr | Wayne Allyn Root | 28,731 | 0.73% | 0 |
| Constitution | Chuck Baldwin (write-in) | Darrell Castle | 1,404 | 0.04% | 0 |
| Independent | Ralph Nader (write-in) | Matt Gonzalez | 1,165 | 0.03% | 0 |
| Green | Cynthia McKinney (write-in) | Rosa Clemente | 250 | 0.01% | 0 |
| Constitution | Michael Peroutka* (write-in) | n/a | 23 | 0.00% | 0 |
| Socialist Workers | James Harris (write-in) | Alyson Kennedy | 20 | 0.00% | 0 |
| HeartQuake '08 | Jonathan Allen (write-in) | Jeffrey Stath | 9 | 0.00% | 0 |
| Independent | Frank Moore (write-in) | Susan Block | 6 | 0.00% | 0 |
| Write-in | David C. Byrne | n/a | 4 | 0.00% | 0 |
| Write-in | Brian R. Brown | n/a | 2 | 0.00% | 0 |
| Totals | | | 3,932,193 | 100.00% | 15 |
| Voter turnout | | | | | 75.7% |

(*Peroutka was not the Constitution Party's nominee in 2008.)

=== By county ===
| County | John McCain Republican | | Barack Obama Democratic | | Various candidates Other parties | | Margin | | Total |
| County | # | % | # | % | # | % | # | % | Total |
|---|---|---|---|---|---|---|---|---|---|
| Appling | 5,085 | 72.62% | 1,846 | 26.36% | 71 | 1.02% | 3,239 | 46.26% | 7,002 |
| Atkinson | 1,941 | 66.77% | 938 | 32.27% | 28 | 0.96% | 1,003 | 34.50% | 2,907 |
| Bacon | 3,089 | 78.36% | 817 | 20.73% | 36 | 0.92% | 2,272 | 57.63% | 3,942 |
| Baker | 828 | 49.02% | 846 | 50.09% | 71 | 1.02% | -18 | -1.07% | 1,689 |
| Baldwin | 7,823 | 47.23% | 8,587 | 51.84% | 154 | 0.93% | -764 | -4.61% | 16,564 |
| Banks | 5,120 | 81.93% | 1,027 | 16.43% | 102 | 1.63% | 4,093 | 65.50% | 6,249 |
| Barrow | 17,625 | 71.55% | 6,657 | 27.02% | 351 | 1.43% | 10,968 | 44.53% | 24,633 |
| Bartow | 25,976 | 71.81% | 9,662 | 26.71% | 537 | 1.48% | 16,314 | 45.10% | 36,175 |
| Ben Hill | 3,417 | 56.46% | 2,590 | 42.80% | 45 | 0.74% | 827 | 13.66% | 6,052 |
| Berrien | 4,901 | 75.95% | 1,471 | 22.80% | 81 | 1.26% | 3,430 | 53.15% | 6,453 |
| Bibb | 27,037 | 40.69% | 38,987 | 58.67% | 424 | 0.64% | -11,950 | -17.98% | 66,448 |
| Bleckley | 3,657 | 71.93% | 1,380 | 27.14% | 47 | 0.93% | 2,277 | 44.79% | 5,084 |
| Brantley | 5,080 | 80.79% | 1,119 | 17.80% | 89 | 1.41% | 3,961 | 62.99% | 6,288 |
| Brooks | 3,507 | 56.52% | 2,669 | 43.01% | 29 | 0.47% | 838 | 13.51% | 6,205 |
| Bryan | 9,112 | 70.82% | 3,636 | 28.26% | 119 | 0.92% | 5,476 | 42.56% | 12,867 |
| Bulloch | 14,174 | 59.12% | 9,586 | 39.98% | 216 | 0.90% | 4,588 | 19.14% | 23,976 |
| Burke | 4,344 | 45.08% | 5,233 | 54.30% | 60 | 0.63% | -889 | -9.22% | 9,637 |
| Butts | 5,947 | 65.32% | 3,065 | 33.67% | 92 | 1.01% | 2,882 | 31.65% | 9,104 |
| Calhoun | 862 | 38.97% | 1,342 | 60.67% | 8 | 0.37% | -480 | -21.70% | 2,212 |
| Camden | 10,502 | 61.39% | 6,482 | 37.89% | 124 | 0.73% | 4,020 | 23.50% | 17,108 |
| Candler | 2,286 | 64.91% | 1,209 | 34.33% | 27 | 0.77% | 1,077 | 30.58% | 3,522 |
| Carroll | 28,661 | 65.76% | 14,334 | 32.89% | 588 | 1.34% | 14,327 | 32.87% | 43,583 |
| Catoosa | 18,218 | 74.04% | 6,025 | 24.49% | 362 | 1.46% | 12,193 | 49.55% | 24,605 |
| Charlton | 2,466 | 66.70% | 1,197 | 32.38% | 34 | 0.92% | 1,269 | 34.32% | 3,697 |
| Chatham | 46,829 | 42.40% | 62,755 | 56.82% | 858 | 0.77% | -15,926 | -14.42% | 110,442 |
| Chattahoochee | 811 | 48.97% | 830 | 50.12% | 15 | 0.90% | -19 | -1.15% | 1,656 |
| Chattooga | 5,572 | 66.83% | 2,596 | 31.14% | 169 | 2.03% | 2,976 | 35.69% | 8,337 |
| Cherokee | 70,279 | 74.79% | 22,350 | 23.78% | 1,344 | 1.43% | 47,929 | 51.01% | 93,973 |
| Clarke | 15,333 | 33.58% | 29,591 | 64.80% | 742 | 1.62% | -14,258 | -31.22% | 45,666 |
| Clay | 558 | 38.75% | 879 | 61.04% | 3 | 0.21% | -321 | -22.29% | 1,440 |
| Clayton | 16,506 | 16.59% | 82,527 | 82.93% | 481 | 0.48% | -66,021 | -66.34% | 99,514 |
| Clinch | 1,678 | 62.10% | 989 | 36.60% | 35 | 1.29% | 689 | 25.50% | 2,702 |
| Cobb | 170,957 | 54.08% | 141,216 | 44.67% | 3,951 | 1.25% | 29,741 | 9.41% | 316,124 |
| Coffee | 8,872 | 64.49% | 4,811 | 34.97% | 75 | 0.54% | 4,061 | 29.52% | 13,758 |
| Colquitt | 9,185 | 68.27% | 4,139 | 30.76% | 130 | 0.97% | 5,046 | 37.51% | 13,454 |
| Columbia | 39,322 | 70.89% | 15,703 | 28.31% | 441 | 0.80% | 23,619 | 42.58% | 55,466 |
| Cook | 3,782 | 64.00% | 2,075 | 35.12% | 52 | 0.88% | 1,707 | 28.88% | 5,909 |
| Coweta | 37,571 | 70.05% | 15,521 | 28.94% | 543 | 1.01% | 22,050 | 41.11% | 53,635 |
| Crawford | 3,358 | 63.99% | 1,832 | 34.91% | 58 | 1.11% | 1,526 | 29.08% | 5,248 |
| Crisp | 4,424 | 58.56% | 3,085 | 40.84% | 45 | 0.60% | 1,339 | 17.72% | 7,554 |
| Dade | 4,703 | 73.01% | 1,612 | 25.02% | 127 | 1.97% | 3,091 | 47.99% | 6,442 |
| Dawson | 8,242 | 82.54% | 1,632 | 16.34% | 112 | 1.12% | 6,610 | 66.20% | 9,986 |
| Decatur | 5,890 | 56.72% | 4,424 | 42.60% | 71 | 0.68% | 1,466 | 14.12% | 10,385 |
| DeKalb | 65,581 | 20.31% | 254,594 | 78.86% | 2,671 | 0.83% | -189,013 | -58.55% | 322,846 |
| Dodge | 5,543 | 67.40% | 2,595 | 31.55% | 86 | 1.04% | 2,948 | 35.85% | 8,224 |
| Dooly | 1,991 | 47.85% | 2,138 | 51.38% | 32 | 0.77% | -147 | -3.53% | 4,161 |
| Dougherty | 12,547 | 32.27% | 26,135 | 67.21% | 204 | 0.53% | -13,588 | -34.94% | 38,886 |
| Douglas | 26,812 | 48.58% | 27,825 | 50.41% | 560 | 1.02% | -1,013 | -1.83% | 55,197 |
| Early | 2,711 | 50.74% | 2,603 | 48.72% | 29 | 0.54% | 108 | 2.02% | 5,343 |
| Echols | 981 | 82.58% | 201 | 16.92% | 6 | 0.50% | 780 | 65.66% | 1,188 |
| Effingham | 15,230 | 74.87% | 4,936 | 24.27% | 175 | 0.86% | 10,294 | 50.60% | 20,341 |
| Elbert | 4,868 | 58.43% | 3,366 | 40.40% | 98 | 1.18% | 1,502 | 18.03% | 8,332 |
| Emanuel | 5,110 | 61.92% | 3,068 | 37.18% | 74 | 0.90% | 2,042 | 24.74% | 8,252 |
| Evans | 2,462 | 63.85% | 1,374 | 35.63% | 20 | 0.52% | 1,088 | 28.22% | 3,856 |
| Fannin | 7,807 | 73.35% | 2,611 | 24.53% | 225 | 2.11% | 5,196 | 48.82% | 10,643 |
| Fayette | 38,501 | 64.77% | 20,313 | 34.17% | 627 | 1.05% | 18,188 | 30.60% | 59,441 |
| Floyd | 23,132 | 67.40% | 10,691 | 31.15% | 499 | 1.46% | 12,441 | 36.25% | 34,322 |
| Forsyth | 59,166 | 78.36% | 15,406 | 20.40% | 931 | 1.23% | 43,760 | 57.96% | 75,503 |
| Franklin | 6,069 | 74.90% | 1,914 | 23.62% | 120 | 1.48% | 4,155 | 51.28% | 8,103 |
| Fulton | 130,136 | 32.08% | 272,000 | 67.06% | 3,489 | 0.86% | -141,864 | -34.98% | 405,625 |
| Gilmer | 8,408 | 75.17% | 2,614 | 23.37% | 164 | 1.47% | 5,794 | 51.80% | 11,186 |
| Glascock | 1,202 | 84.17% | 210 | 14.71% | 16 | 1.12% | 992 | 69.46% | 1,428 |
| Glynn | 20,479 | 61.31% | 12,676 | 37.95% | 248 | 0.74% | 7,803 | 23.36% | 33,403 |
| Gordon | 13,113 | 74.27% | 4,268 | 24.17% | 274 | 1.55% | 8,845 | 50.10% | 17,655 |
| Grady | 5,775 | 61.63% | 3,539 | 37.77% | 57 | 0.61% | 2,236 | 23.86% | 9,371 |
| Greene | 4,532 | 57.21% | 3,339 | 42.15% | 50 | 0.63% | 1,193 | 15.06% | 7,921 |
| Gwinnett | 158,746 | 54.56% | 129,025 | 44.35% | 3,167 | 1.09% | 29,721 | 10.21% | 290,938 |
| Habersham | 11,766 | 79.18% | 2,900 | 19.52% | 193 | 1.29% | 8,866 | 59.66% | 14,859 |
| Hall | 44,962 | 74.77% | 14,457 | 24.04% | 711 | 1.19% | 30,505 | 50.73% | 60,130 |
| Hancock | 795 | 18.28% | 3,535 | 81.30% | 18 | 0.41% | -2,740 | -63.02% | 4,348 |
| Haralson | 8,658 | 77.79% | 2,248 | 20.20% | 224 | 2.01% | 6,410 | 57.59% | 11,130 |
| Harris | 10,648 | 71.25% | 4,184 | 28.00% | 113 | 0.76% | 6,464 | 43.25% | 14,945 |
| Hart | 6,537 | 65.21% | 3,365 | 33.57% | 122 | 1.22% | 3,172 | 31.64% | 10,024 |
| Heard | 3,133 | 74.05% | 1,042 | 24.63% | 56 | 1.32% | 2,091 | 49.42% | 4,231 |
| Henry | 47,157 | 53.29% | 40,567 | 45.85% | 762 | 0.87% | 6,590 | 7.44% | 88,486 |
| Houston | 33,392 | 59.59% | 22,094 | 39.43% | 548 | 0.98% | 11,298 | 20.16% | 56,034 |
| Irwin | 2,605 | 67.84% | 1,197 | 31.17% | 38 | 0.99% | 1,408 | 36.67% | 3,840 |
| Jackson | 17,776 | 77.23% | 4,950 | 21.51% | 290 | 1.26% | 12,826 | 55.72% | 23,016 |
| Jasper | 3,916 | 66.25% | 1,935 | 32.74% | 60 | 1.02% | 1,981 | 33.51% | 5,911 |
| Jeff Davis | 3,867 | 73.16% | 1,356 | 25.65% | 63 | 1.20% | 2,511 | 47.51% | 5,286 |
| Jefferson | 3,061 | 42.31% | 4,149 | 57.35% | 25 | 0.34% | -1,088 | -15.04% | 7,235 |
| Jenkins | 1,936 | 56.25% | 1,482 | 43.06% | 24 | 0.70% | 454 | 13.19% | 3,442 |
| Johnson | 2,426 | 66.47% | 1,198 | 32.82% | 26 | 0.71% | 1,228 | 33.65% | 3,650 |
| Jones | 7,782 | 62.46% | 4,572 | 36.69% | 106 | 0.85% | 3,210 | 25.77% | 12,460 |
| Lamar | 4,873 | 63.24% | 2,752 | 35.72% | 80 | 1.04% | 2,121 | 27.52% | 7,705 |
| Lanier | 1,787 | 62.05% | 1,062 | 36.88% | 31 | 1.08% | 725 | 25.17% | 2,880 |
| Laurens | 12,052 | 60.37% | 7,769 | 38.92% | 142 | 0.71% | 4,283 | 21.45% | 19,963 |
| Lee | 9,925 | 75.69% | 3,100 | 23.64% | 87 | 0.67% | 6,825 | 52.05% | 13,112 |
| Liberty | 5,828 | 35.54% | 10,474 | 63.87% | 98 | 0.60% | -4,646 | -28.33% | 16,400 |
| Lincoln | 2,731 | 61.73% | 1,650 | 37.30% | 43 | 0.97% | 1,081 | 24.43% | 4,424 |
| Long | 2,119 | 61.24% | 1,288 | 37.23% | 53 | 1.53% | 831 | 24.01% | 3,460 |
| Lowndes | 21,269 | 54.19% | 17,597 | 44.83% | 384 | 0.98% | 3,672 | 9.36% | 39,250 |
| Lumpkin | 8,326 | 74.95% | 2,586 | 23.28% | 196 | 1.77% | 5,740 | 51.67% | 11,108 |
| Macon | 1,712 | 34.35% | 3,251 | 65.23% | 21 | 0.42% | -1,539 | -30.88% | 4,984 |
| Madison | 8,226 | 72.38% | 2,965 | 26.09% | 174 | 1.53% | 5,261 | 46.29% | 11,365 |
| Marion | 1,772 | 55.58% | 1,381 | 43.32% | 35 | 1.10% | 391 | 12.26% | 3,188 |
| McDuffie | 5,400 | 57.11% | 3,989 | 42.19% | 66 | 0.70% | 1,411 | 14.92% | 9,455 |
| McIntosh | 3,282 | 52.63% | 2,905 | 46.58% | 49 | 0.79% | 377 | 6.05% | 6,236 |
| Meriwether | 4,982 | 52.34% | 4,465 | 46.91% | 71 | 0.75% | 517 | 5.43% | 9,518 |
| Miller | 1,899 | 69.31% | 818 | 29.85% | 23 | 0.84% | 1,081 | 39.46% | 2,740 |
| Mitchell | 4,201 | 51.66% | 3,872 | 47.61% | 59 | 0.72% | 329 | 4.05% | 8,132 |
| Monroe | 7,933 | 65.31% | 4,106 | 33.80% | 108 | 0.89% | 3,827 | 31.51% | 12,147 |
| Montgomery | 2,521 | 70.16% | 1,045 | 29.08% | 27 | 0.75% | 1,476 | 41.08% | 3,593 |
| Morgan | 5,987 | 65.32% | 3,091 | 33.73% | 87 | 0.95% | 2,896 | 31.59% | 9,165 |
| Murray | 8,180 | 71.46% | 3,026 | 26.43% | 241 | 2.10% | 5,154 | 45.03% | 11,447 |
| Muscogee | 29,568 | 39.87% | 44,158 | 59.54% | 436 | 0.58% | -14,590 | -19.67% | 74,162 |
| Newton | 20,337 | 49.03% | 20,827 | 50.21% | 318 | 0.77% | -490 | -1.18% | 41,482 |
| Oconee | 12,120 | 70.57% | 4,825 | 28.09% | 229 | 1.33% | 7,295 | 42.48% | 17,174 |
| Oglethorpe | 4,144 | 64.12% | 2,232 | 34.54% | 87 | 1.35% | 1,912 | 29.58% | 6,463 |
| Paulding | 39,192 | 68.67% | 17,229 | 30.19% | 655 | 1.15% | 21,963 | 38.48% | 57,076 |
| Peach | 5,173 | 46.20% | 5,927 | 52.94% | 96 | 0.86% | -754 | -6.74% | 11,196 |
| Pickens | 10,004 | 78.08% | 2,595 | 20.25% | 214 | 1.67% | 7,409 | 57.83% | 12,813 |
| Pierce | 5,500 | 80.92% | 1,253 | 18.43% | 44 | 0.65% | 4,247 | 62.49% | 6,797 |
| Pike | 6,547 | 79.64% | 1,575 | 19.16% | 99 | 1.21% | 4,972 | 60.48% | 8,221 |
| Polk | 9,850 | 69.60% | 4,052 | 28.63% | 251 | 1.77% | 5,798 | 40.97% | 14,153 |
| Pulaski | 2,553 | 64.44% | 1,377 | 34.76% | 32 | 0.81% | 1,176 | 29.68% | 3,962 |
| Putnam | 5,966 | 65.28% | 3,102 | 33.94% | 71 | 0.78% | 2,864 | 31.34% | 9,139 |
| Quitman | 509 | 45.61% | 597 | 53.49% | 10 | 0.90% | -88 | -7.88% | 1,116 |
| Rabun | 5,487 | 71.89% | 2,001 | 26.22% | 145 | 1.91% | 3,486 | 45.67% | 7,633 |
| Randolph | 1,370 | 42.59% | 1,833 | 56.98% | 14 | 0.43% | -463 | -14.39% | 3,217 |
| Richmond | 26,842 | 33.80% | 52,100 | 65.60% | 480 | 0.60% | -25,258 | -31.80% | 79,422 |
| Rockdale | 16,921 | 44.78% | 20,526 | 54.32% | 337 | 0.89% | -3,605 | -9.54% | 37,784 |
| Schley | 1,252 | 72.00% | 479 | 27.54% | 8 | 0.47% | 773 | 44.46% | 1,739 |
| Screven | 3,423 | 52.77% | 3,024 | 46.62% | 40 | 0.61% | 399 | 6.15% | 6,487 |
| Seminole | 2,315 | 57.77% | 1,660 | 41.43% | 32 | 0.79% | 655 | 16.34% | 4,007 |
| Spalding | 14,885 | 58.85% | 10,141 | 40.09% | 269 | 1.06% | 4,744 | 18.76% | 25,295 |
| Stephens | 7,689 | 72.87% | 2,705 | 25.63% | 158 | 1.50% | 4,984 | 47.24% | 10,552 |
| Stewart | 783 | 37.13% | 1,305 | 61.88% | 21 | 1.00% | -522 | -24.75% | 2,109 |
| Sumter | 5,717 | 46.65% | 6,454 | 52.66% | 84 | 0.68% | -737 | -6.01% | 12,255 |
| Talbot | 1,301 | 35.15% | 2,369 | 64.01% | 31 | 0.84% | -1,068 | -28.86% | 3,701 |
| Taliaferro | 339 | 34.24% | 643 | 64.95% | 8 | 0.81% | -304 | -30.71% | 990 |
| Tattnall | 4,730 | 70.32% | 1,932 | 28.72% | 64 | 0.95% | 2,798 | 41.60% | 6,726 |
| Taylor | 2,021 | 56.34% | 1,536 | 42.82% | 30 | 0.83% | 485 | 13.52% | 3,587 |
| Telfair | 2,486 | 56.81% | 1,862 | 42.55% | 28 | 0.64% | 624 | 14.26% | 4,376 |
| Terrell | 1,890 | 42.75% | 2,501 | 56.57% | 30 | 0.68% | -611 | -13.82% | 4,421 |
| Thomas | 10,642 | 57.54% | 7,720 | 41.74% | 132 | 0.71% | 2,922 | 15.80% | 18,494 |
| Tift | 9,431 | 66.09% | 4,749 | 33.28% | 89 | 0.62% | 4,682 | 32.81% | 14,269 |
| Toombs | 6,658 | 68.61% | 2,964 | 30.54% | 82 | 0.84% | 3,694 | 38.07% | 9,704 |
| Towns | 4,292 | 74.46% | 1,391 | 24.13% | 81 | 1.40% | 2,901 | 50.33% | 5,764 |
| Treutlen | 1,826 | 61.65% | 1,112 | 37.54% | 24 | 0.81% | 714 | 24.11% | 2,962 |
| Troup | 15,391 | 59.04% | 10,455 | 40.11% | 222 | 0.85% | 4,936 | 18.93% | 26,068 |
| Turner | 2,096 | 58.94% | 1,427 | 40.13% | 33 | 0.93% | 669 | 18.81% | 3,556 |
| Twiggs | 2,087 | 46.15% | 2,402 | 53.12% | 33 | 0.73% | -315 | -6.97% | 4,522 |
| Union | 8,013 | 74.96% | 2,486 | 23.26% | 191 | 1.78% | 5,527 | 51.70% | 10,690 |
| Upson | 7,291 | 63.77% | 4,061 | 35.52% | 82 | 0.71% | 3,230 | 28.25% | 11,434 |
| Walker | 17,110 | 72.33% | 6,095 | 25.77% | 449 | 1.89% | 11,015 | 46.56% | 23,654 |
| Walton | 27,253 | 75.54% | 8,469 | 23.47% | 357 | 0.98% | 18,784 | 52.07% | 36,079 |
| Ware | 8,311 | 66.83% | 4,034 | 32.44% | 91 | 0.73% | 4,277 | 34.39% | 12,436 |
| Warren | 1,087 | 40.83% | 1,554 | 58.38% | 21 | 0.79% | -467 | -17.55% | 2,662 |
| Washington | 4,216 | 47.49% | 4,607 | 51.89% | 55 | 0.62% | -391 | -4.40% | 8,878 |
| Wayne | 7,601 | 71.88% | 2,858 | 27.03% | 116 | 1.10% | 4,743 | 44.85% | 10,575 |
| Webster | 588 | 52.93% | 515 | 46.35% | 8 | 0.72% | 73 | 6.58% | 1,111 |
| Wheeler | 1,408 | 63.60% | 794 | 35.86% | 12 | 0.54% | 614 | 27.74% | 2,214 |
| White | 8,467 | 78.41% | 2,174 | 20.13% | 158 | 1.46% | 6,293 | 58.28% | 10,799 |
| Whitfield | 19,230 | 69.20% | 8,167 | 29.39% | 394 | 1.41% | 11,063 | 39.81% | 27,791 |
| Wilcox | 2,159 | 68.24% | 978 | 30.91% | 27 | 0.85% | 1,181 | 37.33% | 3,164 |
| Wilkes | 2,705 | 53.46% | 2,315 | 45.75% | 40 | 0.79% | 390 | 7.71% | 5,060 |
| Wilkinson | 2,349 | 50.21% | 2,298 | 49.12% | 31 | 0.66% | 51 | 1.09% | 4,678 |
| Worth | 5,780 | 68.96% | 2,542 | 30.33% | 60 | 0.71% | 3,238 | 38.63% | 8,382 |
| Totals | 2,048,759 | 52.10% | 1,844,123 | 46.90% | 39,276 | 1.00% | 204,636 | 5.20% | 3,932,158 |

Counties that flipped from Democratic to Republican

- Webster (largest town: Preston)

Counties that flipped from Republican to Democratic

- Baldwin (largest town: Milledgeville)
- Burke (largest town: Waynesboro)
- Chattahoochee (largest town: Cusseta)
- Douglas (largest town: Douglasville)
- Newton (largest town: Covington)
- Peach (largest town: Fort Valley)
- Rockdale (largest town: Conyers)
- Sumter (largest town: Americus)
- Washington (largest town: Sandersville)

=== By congressional district ===
John McCain carried eight of 13 districts in Georgia, including one district held by a Democrat.

| District | McCain | Obama | Representative |
|---|---|---|---|
| 1st | 62.81% | 36.39% | Jack Kingston |
| 2nd | 45.91% | 53.55% | Sanford Bishop |
| 3rd | 63.87% | 35.27% | Lynn Westmoreland |
| 4th | 20.65% | 78.61% | Hank Johnson |
| 5th | 20.01% | 79.12% | John Lewis |
| 6th | 62.26% | 36.56% | Tom Price |
| 7th | 59.68% | 39.28% | John Linder |
| 8th | 56.34% | 42.98% | Jim Marshall |
| 9th | 75.33% | 23.46% | Nathan Deal |
| 10th | 61.12% | 37.96% | Paul Broun |
| 11th | 65.60% | 33.12% | Phil Gingrey |
| 12th | 45.25% | 54.09% | John Barrow |
| 13th | 28.38% | 70.85% | David Scott |

== Electors ==
Technically the voters of Georgia cast their ballots for electors: representatives to the Electoral College. Georgia is allocated 15 electors because it has 13 congressional districts and 2 senators. All candidates who appear on the ballot or qualify to receive write-in votes must submit a list of 15 electors, who pledge to vote for their candidate and his or her running mate. Whoever wins the majority of votes in the state is awarded all 15 electoral votes. Their chosen electors then vote for president and vice president. Although electors are pledged to their candidate and running mate, they are not obligated to vote for them. An elector who votes for someone other than his or her candidate is known as a faithless elector.

The electors of each state and the District of Columbia met on December 15, 2008, to cast their votes for president and vice president. The Electoral College itself never meets as one body. Instead the electors from each state and the District of Columbia met in their respective capitols.

The following were the members of the Electoral College from the state. All 15 were pledged to John McCain and Sarah Palin:

1. Esther Clark
2. Dennis Coxwell
3. Norma Edenfield
4. Randy Evans
5. Sue P. Everhart
6. Leigh Ann Gillis
7. Judy Goddard
8. Linda Herren
9. Rufus Montgomery
10. Clint Murphy
11. Sunny Park
12. Alec Poitevint
13. John Sours
14. Allan Vigil
15. John White
