= 2012 United States presidential election in Georgia =

- November 6, 2012
- Turnout: 61.9% ▲10.1 pp

Nominee	Mitt Romney	Barack Obama
Party	Republican	Democratic
Home state	Massachusetts	Illinois
Running mate	Paul Ryan	Joe Biden
Electoral vote	16	0
Popular vote	2,078,688	1,773,827
Percentage	53.30%	45.48%

Romney
40–50%
50–60%
60–70%
70–80%
80–90%
90–100%
Obama
40–50%
50–60%
60–70%
70–80%
80–90%
90–100%
Tie/No Data
President before election
Barack Obama
Democratic
Elected President
Barack Obama
Democratic

The 2012 United States presidential election in Georgia took place on November 6, 2012, as part of the 2012 General Election in which all 50 states plus the District of Columbia participated. Georgia voters chose 16 electors to represent them in the Electoral College via a popular vote pitting incumbent Democratic President Barack Obama and his running mate, Vice President Joe Biden, against Republican challenger and former Massachusetts Governor Mitt Romney and his running mate, Congressman Paul Ryan.

Romney won Georgia by a 7.82% margin, an improvement from 2008 when John McCain won by 5.20%. Romney received 53.19% of the vote to Obama's 45.39%. Early County flipped from supporting the Republican candidate to the Democratic candidate, while Chattahoochee County flipped from the Democratic column to the Republican column.

Obama is the only Democrat to ever win two terms without carrying the state at least once, and relatedly the first Democrat since Martin Van Buren to never win Georgia in two elections regardless of the nationwide outcome. Georgia is also one of only two states that voted against Obama in both 2008 and 2012 that his vice president Joe Biden would go on to win in 2020, the other being Arizona.

As of 2024, this is the last time a Democratic presidential nominee won the rural Black Belt counties of Baker, Dooly, Early, Peach, Quitman, and Twiggs; and the last time that the suburban Atlanta counties of Gwinnett, Henry, and Cobb would vote Republican in a presidential race. This is also the last time that Georgia has backed the losing candidate in a presidential election and the last time a Democrat won the presidency without winning Georgia.

== Primary elections ==
=== Democratic primary ===
Incumbent president Barack Obama was unopposed in the Georgia primary, therefore winning all of the state's delegates.

=== Republican primary ===
Georgia Republican primary, 2012
- March 6, 2012
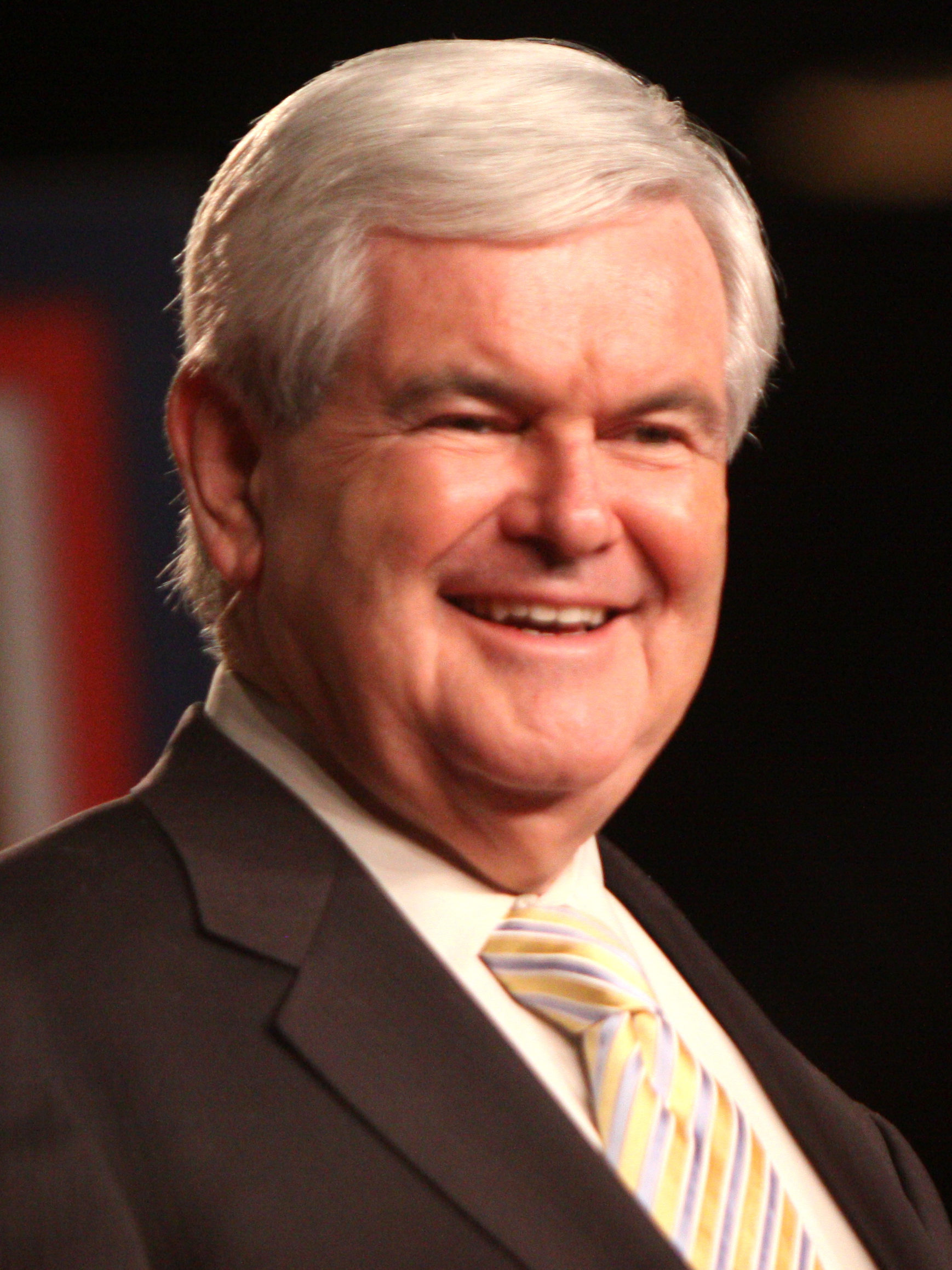

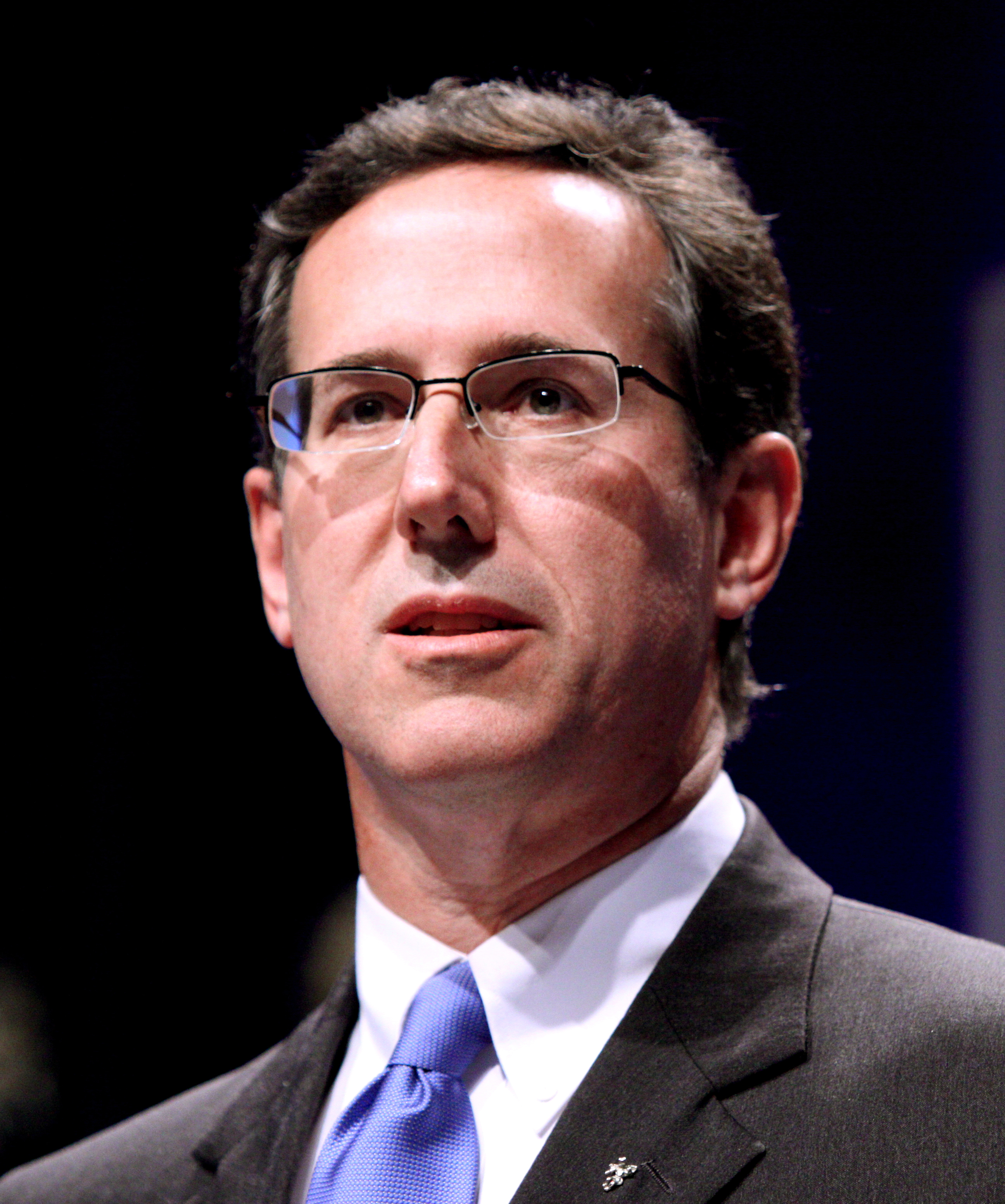

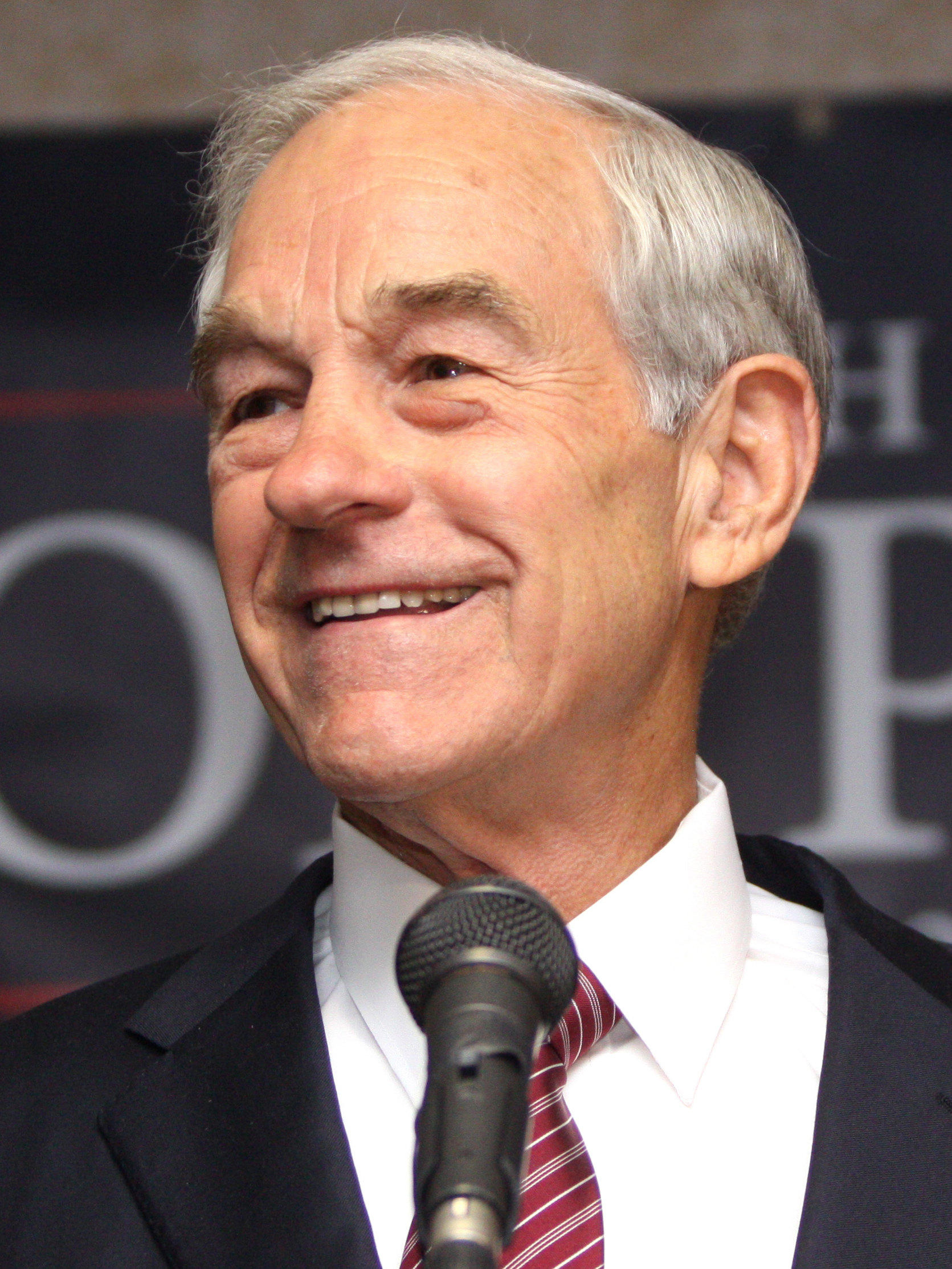
Candidate	Newt Gingrich	Mitt Romney
Home state	Georgia	Massachusetts
Delegate count	52	21
Popular vote	425,395	233,611
Percentage	47.2%	25.9%
Candidate	Rick Santorum	Ron Paul
Home state	Pennsylvania	Texas
Delegate count	3	0
Popular vote	176,259	59,100
Percentage	19.6%	6.6%
Gingrich
30–40%
40–50%
50–60%
60–70%
Romney
30–40%
40–50%

The 2012 Georgia Republican primary took place on March 6, 2012.

Georgia has 76 delegates to the Republic National Convention. The three super delegates are awarded winner-take-all to the statewide winner. Thirty-one delegates are awarded proportionately among candidates winning at least 20% of the vote statewide. Another 42 delegates are allocated by congressional district, 3 delegates for each district. If a candidate obtains a majority in a district, they win all 3 delegates; if no majority is won, the delegates are split 2 and 1 between the top two candidates, respectively.

Georgia Republican primary, 2012
Candidate	Votes	Percentage	Estimated national delegates
Newt Gingrich	425,395	47.2%	54
Mitt Romney	233,611	25.9%	19
Rick Santorum	176,259	19.6%	3
Ron Paul	59,100	6.6%	0
Jon Huntsman Jr.	1,813	0.2%	0
Michele Bachmann	1,714	0.2%	0
Rick Perry	1,696	0.2%	0
Buddy Roemer	1,142	0.13%	0
Gary Johnson	740	0.08%	0
Undecided or Other			0
Totals	901,470	100.0%	76

Key:	Withdrew prior to contest.

== General election ==
=== Predictions ===
Source	Ranking	As of
Huffington Post	Safe R	November 6, 2012
CNN	Safe R	November 6, 2012
The New York Times	Safe R	November 6, 2012
The Washington Post	Safe R	November 6, 2012
RealClearPolitics	Solid R	November 6, 2012
Sabato's Crystal Ball	Solid R	November 5, 2012
FiveThirtyEight	Solid R	November 6, 2012

=== Candidate ballot access ===
- Mitt Romney/Paul Ryan, Republican
- Barack Obama/Joseph Biden, Democratic
- Gary Johnson/James P. Gray, Libertarian

Write-in candidate access:

- Jill Stein/Cheri Honkala, Green
- Virgil Goode/Jim Clymer, Constitution
- Rocky Anderson/Luis J. Rodriguez, Justice

=== Results ===
Out of a total of 6,066,961 registered voters at the time of the presidential election, turnout for the general election was 3,908,369, or 64.42% of registered voters.

United States presidential election in Georgia, 2012
Party	Candidate	Running mate	Votes	Percentage	Electoral votes
Republican	Mitt Romney	Paul Ryan	2,078,688	53.19%	16
Democratic	Barack Obama (incumbent)	Joe Biden (incumbent)	1,773,827	45.39%	0
Libertarian	Gary Johnson	Jim Gray	45,324	1.16%	0
Green (Write-in)	Jill Stein	Cheri Honkala	1,516	0.04%	0
Constitution (Write-in)	Virgil Goode	Jim Clymer	432	0.01%	0
Justice (Write-in)	Rocky Anderson	Luis J. Rodriguez	154	0.00%	0
Other Write-ins	Other Write-ins		109	0.00%	0
Totals			3,900,050	100.00%	16
Voter turnout (registered voters)					71.36%

==== By county ====
County	Mitt Romney Republican		Barack Obama Democratic		Various candidates Other parties		Margin		Total
County	#	%	#	%	#	%	#	%	Total
Appling	5,233	73.78%	1,758	24.78%	102	1.44%	3,475	49.00%	7,093
Atkinson	1,938	66.67%	930	31.99%	39	1.34%	1,008	34.68%	2,907
Bacon	3,093	78.58%	791	20.10%	52	1.32%	2,302	58.48%	3,936
Baker	785	49.34%	794	49.91%	12	0.75%	-9	-0.57%	1,591
Baldwin	7,589	46.64%	8,483	52.14%	198	1.22%	-894	-5.50%	16,270
Banks	5,354	86.30%	780	12.57%	70	1.13%	4,574	73.73%	6,204
Barrow	18,725	74.10%	6,028	23.85%	517	2.05%	12,697	50.25%	25,270
Bartow	26,876	74.87%	8,396	23.39%	625	1.74%	18,480	51.48%	35,897
Ben Hill	3,396	56.88%	2,512	42.08%	62	1.04%	884	14.80%	5,970
Berrien	4,843	77.81%	1,273	20.45%	108	1.74%	3,570	57.36%	6,224
Bibb	25,623	39.54%	38,585	59.54%	595	0.92%	-12,962	-20.00%	64,803
Bleckley	3,587	72.91%	1,269	25.79%	64	1.30%	2,318	47.12%	4,920
Brantley	4,964	82.46%	939	15.60%	117	1.94%	4,025	66.86%	6,020
Brooks	3,554	52.62%	3,138	46.46%	62	0.92%	416	6.16%	6,754
Bryan	9,560	70.94%	3,707	27.51%	209	1.55%	5,853	43.43%	13,476
Bulloch	14,174	58.73%	9,593	39.75%	366	1.52%	4,581	18.98%	24,133
Burke	4,301	43.92%	5,405	55.19%	87	0.89%	-1,104	-11.27%	9,793
Butts	6,306	67.09%	2,968	31.57%	126	1.34%	3,338	35.52%	9,400
Calhoun	883	40.34%	1,298	59.30%	8	0.36%	-415	-18.96%	2,189
Camden	11,343	62.84%	6,377	35.33%	330	1.83%	4,966	27.51%	18,050
Candler	2,344	66.38%	1,157	32.77%	30	0.85%	1,187	33.61%	3,531
Carroll	28,280	67.86%	12,688	30.45%	704	1.69%	15,592	37.41%	41,672
Catoosa	17,858	75.06%	5,365	22.55%	568	2.39%	12,493	52.51%	23,791
Charlton	2,527	67.12%	1,197	31.79%	41	1.09%	1,330	35.33%	3,765
Chatham	47,204	43.38%	60,246	55.36%	1,371	1.26%	-13,042	-11.98%	108,821
Chattahoochee	735	49.23%	729	48.83%	29	1.94%	6	0.40%	1,493
Chattooga	5,452	69.28%	2,232	28.36%	185	2.36%	3,220	40.92%	7,869
Cherokee	76,514	77.73%	19,841	20.16%	2,084	2.11%	56,673	57.57%	98,439
Clarke	13,815	34.10%	25,431	62.77%	1,269	3.13%	-11,616	-28.67%	40,515
Clay	537	38.28%	862	61.44%	4	0.28%	-325	-23.16%	1,403
Clayton	14,164	14.72%	81,479	84.67%	587	0.61%	-67,315	-69.95%	96,230
Clinch	1,598	64.57%	852	34.42%	25	1.01%	746	30.15%	2,475
Cobb	171,722	55.25%	133,124	42.83%	5,989	1.92%	38,598	12.42%	310,835
Coffee	9,248	63.89%	5,057	34.94%	169	1.17%	4,191	28.95%	14,474
Colquitt	9,243	69.25%	3,973	29.77%	131	0.98%	5,270	39.48%	13,347
Columbia	41,765	70.70%	16,451	27.85%	855	1.45%	25,314	42.85%	59,071
Cook	3,935	65.14%	2,042	33.80%	64	1.06%	1,893	31.34%	6,041
Coweta	39,653	71.17%	15,168	27.22%	897	1.61%	24,485	43.95%	55,718
Crawford	3,368	65.47%	1,706	33.16%	70	1.37%	1,662	32.31%	5,144
Crisp	4,182	56.51%	3,167	42.80%	51	0.69%	1,015	13.71%	7,400
Dade	4,471	73.94%	1,411	23.33%	165	2.73%	3,060	50.61%	6,047
Dawson	8,847	86.19%	1,241	12.09%	176	1.72%	7,606	74.10%	10,264
Decatur	5,824	55.47%	4,591	43.72%	85	0.81%	1,233	11.75%	10,500
DeKalb	64,392	20.98%	238,224	77.63%	4,242	1.39%	-173,832	-56.65%	306,858
Dodge	5,214	67.24%	2,442	31.49%	98	1.27%	2,772	35.75%	7,754
Dooly	1,985	46.14%	2,285	53.11%	32	0.75%	-300	-6.97%	4,302
Dougherty	11,449	30.15%	26,295	69.24%	231	0.61%	-14,846	-39.09%	37,975
Douglas	26,241	47.38%	28,441	51.36%	697	1.26%	-2,200	-3.98%	55,379
Early	2,557	47.71%	2,765	51.60%	37	0.69%	-208	-3.89%	5,359
Echols	917	82.99%	173	15.66%	15	1.35%	744	67.33%	1,105
Effingham	15,596	74.79%	4,947	23.72%	311	1.49%	10,649	51.07%	20,854
Elbert	4,859	59.58%	3,181	39.00%	116	1.42%	1,678	20.58%	8,156
Emanuel	5,100	63.05%	2,927	36.18%	62	0.77%	2,173	26.87%	8,089
Evans	2,268	63.62%	1,268	35.57%	29	0.81%	1,000	28.05%	3,565
Fannin	7,857	78.10%	2,028	20.16%	175	1.74%	5,829	57.94%	10,060
Fayette	38,075	64.83%	19,736	33.61%	917	1.56%	18,339	31.22%	58,728
Floyd	22,733	69.04%	9,640	29.28%	554	1.68%	13,093	39.76%	32,927
Forsyth	65,908	80.47%	14,571	17.79%	1,421	1.74%	51,337	62.68%	81,900
Franklin	6,114	78.62%	1,499	19.27%	164	2.11%	4,615	59.35%	7,777
Fulton	137,124	34.42%	255,470	64.13%	5,752	1.45%	-118,346	-29.71%	398,346
Gilmer	8,926	80.76%	1,958	17.71%	169	1.53%	6,968	63.05%	11,053
Glascock	1,135	84.96%	176	13.17%	25	1.87%	959	71.79%	1,336
Glynn	20,893	62.95%	11,950	36.00%	348	1.05%	8,943	26.95%	33,191
Gordon	13,197	77.91%	3,440	20.31%	302	1.78%	9,757	57.60%	16,939
Grady	5,924	62.93%	3,419	36.32%	70	0.75%	2,505	26.61%	9,413
Greene	5,071	60.90%	3,201	38.44%	55	0.66%	1,870	22.46%	8,327
Gwinnett	159,855	53.76%	132,509	44.56%	4,992	1.68%	27,346	9.20%	297,356
Habersham	12,166	82.90%	2,301	15.68%	209	1.42%	9,865	67.22%	14,676
Hall	47,481	77.19%	12,999	21.13%	1,032	1.68%	34,482	56.06%	61,512
Hancock	769	18.80%	3,308	80.88%	13	0.32%	-2,539	-62.08%	4,090
Haralson	8,446	81.16%	1,789	17.19%	172	1.65%	6,657	63.97%	10,407
Harris	11,197	72.14%	4,145	26.71%	179	1.15%	7,052	45.43%	15,521
Hart	6,517	68.39%	2,870	30.12%	142	1.49%	3,647	38.27%	9,529
Heard	3,160	75.63%	948	22.69%	70	1.68%	2,212	52.94%	4,178
Henry	46,774	51.10%	43,761	47.81%	996	1.09%	3,013	3.29%	91,531
Houston	34,662	59.58%	22,702	39.02%	811	1.40%	11,960	20.56%	58,175
Irwin	2,538	68.34%	1,141	30.72%	35	0.94%	1,397	37.62%	3,714
Jackson	19,135	80.59%	4,238	17.85%	372	1.56%	14,897	62.74%	23,745
Jasper	4,136	68.45%	1,845	30.54%	61	1.01%	2,291	37.91%	6,042
Jeff Davis	3,996	74.85%	1,275	23.88%	68	1.27%	2,721	50.97%	5,339
Jefferson	2,999	41.08%	4,261	58.36%	41	0.56%	-1,262	-17.28%	7,301
Jenkins	1,887	55.60%	1,488	43.84%	19	0.56%	399	11.76%	3,394
Johnson	2,440	64.62%	1,305	34.56%	31	0.82%	1,135	30.06%	3,776
Jones	7,744	63.90%	4,274	35.27%	101	0.83%	3,470	28.63%	12,119
Lamar	4,899	64.36%	2,602	34.18%	111	1.46%	2,297	30.18%	7,612
Lanier	1,820	61.11%	1,114	37.41%	44	1.48%	706	23.70%	2,978
Laurens	11,950	60.85%	7,513	38.26%	176	0.89%	4,437	22.59%	19,639
Lee	10,314	75.58%	3,196	23.42%	136	1.00%	7,118	52.16%	13,646
Liberty	5,565	34.36%	10,457	64.57%	173	1.07%	-4,892	-30.21%	16,195
Lincoln	2,807	63.36%	1,586	35.80%	37	0.84%	1,221	27.56%	4,430
Long	2,306	60.45%	1,442	37.80%	67	1.75%	864	22.65%	3,815
Lowndes	21,327	54.38%	17,470	44.54%	424	1.08%	3,857	9.84%	39,221
Lumpkin	8,647	78.98%	2,055	18.77%	246	2.25%	6,592	60.21%	10,948
Macon	1,545	32.28%	3,211	67.09%	30	0.63%	-1,666	-34.81%	4,786
Madison	8,443	75.84%	2,494	22.40%	196	1.76%	5,949	53.44%	11,133
Marion	1,733	54.51%	1,412	44.42%	34	1.07%	321	10.09%	3,179
McDuffie	5,475	57.00%	4,044	42.10%	86	0.90%	1,431	14.90%	9,605
McIntosh	3,409	53.65%	2,864	45.07%	81	1.28%	545	8.58%	6,354
Meriwether	4,856	52.36%	4,331	46.70%	87	0.94%	525	5.66%	9,274
Miller	1,905	68.53%	852	30.65%	23	0.82%	1,053	37.88%	2,780
Mitchell	4,155	50.18%	4,081	49.28%	45	0.54%	74	0.90%	8,281
Monroe	8,361	68.00%	3,785	30.78%	149	1.22%	4,576	37.22%	12,295
Montgomery	2,662	69.41%	1,135	29.60%	38	0.99%	1,527	39.81%	3,835
Morgan	6,186	68.42%	2,753	30.45%	102	1.13%	3,433	37.97%	9,041
Murray	8,443	75.02%	2,542	22.59%	270	2.39%	5,901	52.43%	11,255
Muscogee	27,510	38.90%	42,573	60.20%	632	0.90%	-15,063	-21.30%	70,715
Newton	20,982	48.45%	21,851	50.45%	476	1.10%	-869	-2.00%	43,309
Oconee	13,098	73.34%	4,421	24.76%	340	1.90%	8,677	48.58%	17,859
Oglethorpe	4,251	67.64%	1,914	30.45%	120	1.91%	2,337	37.19%	6,285
Paulding	40,846	70.98%	15,825	27.50%	872	1.52%	25,021	43.48%	57,543
Peach	5,287	45.83%	6,148	53.29%	102	0.88%	-861	-7.46%	11,537
Pickens	10,547	83.03%	1,975	15.55%	180	1.42%	8,572	67.48%	12,702
Pierce	5,667	82.67%	1,124	16.40%	64	0.93%	4,543	66.27%	6,855
Pike	6,668	81.93%	1,356	16.66%	115	1.41%	5,312	65.27%	8,139
Polk	9,811	71.89%	3,615	26.49%	222	1.62%	6,196	45.40%	13,648
Pulaski	2,444	66.32%	1,219	33.08%	22	0.60%	1,225	33.24%	3,685
Putnam	6,215	67.34%	2,926	31.70%	88	0.96%	3,289	35.64%	9,229
Quitman	510	45.21%	612	54.26%	6	0.53%	-102	-9.05%	1,128
Rabun	5,754	77.08%	1,559	20.88%	152	2.04%	4,195	56.20%	7,465
Randolph	1,271	41.54%	1,770	57.84%	19	0.62%	-499	-16.30%	3,060
Richmond	25,845	32.64%	52,560	66.39%	769	0.97%	-26,715	-33.75%	79,174
Rockdale	15,716	41.19%	22,023	57.72%	417	1.09%	-6,307	-16.53%	38,156
Schley	1,286	73.40%	448	25.57%	18	1.03%	838	47.83%	1,752
Screven	3,287	53.79%	2,774	45.39%	50	0.82%	513	8.40%	6,111
Seminole	2,245	59.44%	1,478	39.13%	54	1.43%	767	20.31%	3,777
Spalding	14,911	59.31%	9,898	39.37%	330	1.32%	5,013	19.94%	25,139
Stephens	7,221	75.74%	2,131	22.35%	182	1.91%	5,090	53.39%	9,534
Stewart	745	35.89%	1,323	63.73%	8	0.38%	-578	-27.84%	2,076
Sumter	5,378	45.36%	6,375	53.77%	103	0.87%	-997	-8.41%	11,856
Talbot	1,202	34.41%	2,265	64.84%	26	0.75%	-1,063	-30.43%	3,493
Taliaferro	323	33.54%	636	66.04%	4	0.42%	-313	-32.50%	963
Tattnall	4,706	70.48%	1,897	28.41%	74	1.11%	2,809	42.07%	6,677
Taylor	1,948	55.03%	1,572	44.41%	20	0.56%	376	10.62%	3,540
Telfair	2,480	57.17%	1,805	41.61%	53	1.22%	675	15.56%	4,338
Terrell	1,834	41.62%	2,544	57.73%	29	0.65%	-710	-16.11%	4,407
Thomas	11,156	58.74%	7,653	40.30%	183	0.96%	3,503	18.44%	18,992
Tift	9,185	65.88%	4,660	33.42%	97	0.70%	4,525	32.46%	13,942
Toombs	6,524	69.72%	2,746	29.35%	87	0.93%	3,778	40.37%	9,357
Towns	4,876	78.09%	1,273	20.39%	95	1.52%	3,603	57.70%	6,244
Treutlen	1,652	60.05%	1,074	39.04%	25	0.91%	578	21.01%	2,751
Troup	15,179	58.30%	10,547	40.51%	309	1.19%	4,632	17.79%	26,035
Turner	2,028	56.85%	1,510	42.33%	29	0.82%	518	14.52%	3,567
Twiggs	1,907	45.35%	2,270	53.98%	28	0.67%	-363	-8.63%	4,205
Union	8,773	78.97%	2,139	19.25%	197	1.78%	6,634	59.72%	11,109
Upson	7,230	64.10%	3,959	35.10%	90	0.80%	3,271	29.00%	11,279
Walker	16,247	73.86%	5,274	23.98%	475	2.16%	10,973	49.88%	21,996
Walton	29,036	77.07%	8,148	21.63%	493	1.30%	20,888	55.44%	37,677
Ware	7,941	66.44%	3,900	32.63%	112	0.93%	4,041	33.81%	11,953
Warren	990	39.18%	1,529	60.51%	8	0.31%	-539	-21.33%	2,527
Washington	4,035	45.76%	4,714	53.46%	68	0.78%	-679	-7.70%	8,817
Wayne	7,557	73.45%	2,596	25.23%	135	1.32%	4,961	48.22%	10,288
Webster	601	50.59%	582	48.99%	5	0.42%	19	1.60%	1,188
Wheeler	1,366	63.09%	772	35.66%	27	1.25%	594	27.43%	2,165
White	8,651	82.21%	1,671	15.88%	201	1.91%	6,980	66.33%	10,523
Whitfield	19,305	71.58%	7,210	26.74%	453	1.68%	12,095	44.84%	26,968
Wilcox	2,053	65.55%	1,060	33.84%	19	0.61%	993	31.71%	3,132
Wilkes	2,635	55.30%	2,087	43.80%	43	0.90%	548	11.50%	4,765
Wilkinson	2,246	50.40%	2,181	48.95%	29	0.65%	65	1.45%	4,456
Worth	5,869	69.57%	2,487	29.48%	80	0.95%	3,382	40.09%	8,436
Totals	2,078,688	53.19%	1,773,827	45.39%	55,854	1.43%	304,861	7.80%	3,908,369

Counties that flipped from Democratic to Republican

- Chattahoochee (largest city: Cusseta)

Counties that flipped from Republican to Democratic

- Early (largest city: Blakely)

==== By congressional district ====
Romney won ten of 14 congressional districts, including one that elected a Democrat.

District	Romney	Obama	Representative
1st	55.9%	43%	Jack Kingston
2nd	40.8%	58.6%	Sanford Bishop
3rd	65.85%	33%	Lynn Westmoreland
4th	25.6%	73.6%	Hank Johnson
5th	15.8%	83.1%	John Lewis
6th	60.8%	37.45%	Tom Price
7th	60.23%	38.32%	Rob Woodall
8th	61.63%	37.48%	Austin Scott
9th	78.14%	20.5%	Doug Collins
10th	62.46%	36.3%	Paul Broun
11th	66.9%	31.5%	Phil Gingrey
12th	55.42%	43.64%	John Barrow
13th	29.97%	69.24%	David Scott
14th	73.21%	25.3%	Tom Graves

== See also ==
- 2012 Democratic Party presidential primaries
- 2012 Republican Party presidential primaries
- Republican Party presidential debates, 2012
- Results of the 2012 Republican Party presidential primaries
- Georgia Democratic Party
- Georgia Republican Party
