= Chattahoochee County School District =

School district in Georgia (U.S. state)

Address
- 326 Broad Street Cusseta, Georgia, 31805-3708; United States
- Coordinates: 32°18′28″N 84°47′00″W

District information
- Grades: Pre-school - 12
- Superintendent: Kristie Brooks
- Accreditation: Southern Association of Colleges and Schools; Georgia Accrediting Commission

Students and staff
- Enrollment: 1003
- Faculty: 125

Other information
- Website: www.chattco.org

The Chattahoochee County School District is a public school district in Chattahoochee County, Georgia based in Cusseta. It serves the communities of Cusseta and Fort Benning South.

All parts of the county except Fort Benning are zoned to county schools for all grades. Fort Benning children are zoned to Department of Defense Education Activity (DoDEA) schools for grades K-8. However Fort Benning high school students attend the public high schools in the respective counties they are located in.

== Schools ==
The Chattahoochee County School District has one elementary school, one middle school, and one high school.

- Elementary school: Chattahoochee County Education Center
- Middle school: Chattahoochee County Middle School
- High school: Chattahoochee County High School
