= National Register of Historic Places listings in Chattahoochee County, Georgia =

This is a list of properties and districts in Chattahoochee County, Georgia that are listed on the National Register of Historic Places (NRHP).

This National Park Service list is complete through NPS recent listings posted May 1, 2026.

== Current listings ==
	Name on the Register	Image	Date listed	Location	City or town	Description
1	Chattahoochee County Jail	Chattahoochee County Jail	March 13, 1986 (#86000368)	Mt. Olive and Boyd Sts. 32°18′24″N 84°46′32″W	Cusseta	Constructed in 1902, this two-story fireproof facility was built to replace the previous two-story log jail built in 1855. Romanesque influences such as the arched windows and door openings with an extended central bay enhance the exterior appearance of the building, The original prefabricated iron cells with unique corner fireplaces are located on the second floor. The jail served the county until 1975.
2	Cusseta Industrial High School	Cusseta Industrial High School	April 15, 2011 (#11000184)	113 Sandy Rd. 32°18′02″N 84°46′21″W	Cusseta	Rosenwald Schools in Georgia, 1912-1937 MPS
3	Riverside	Riverside	May 27, 1971 (#71000272)	100 Vibbert Ave. 32°22′01″N 84°57′34″W	Fort Benning	

== Former listings ==
	Name on the Register	Image	Date listed	Date removed	Location	City or town	Description
1	Chattahoochee County Courthouse	Chattahoochee County Courthouse	September 12, 1974 (#75002164)	November 20, 1975	Off US 27/280	Cusetta	Moved to Westville in Stewart County
