= Chattahoochee County Jail =

- U.S. National Register of Historic Places
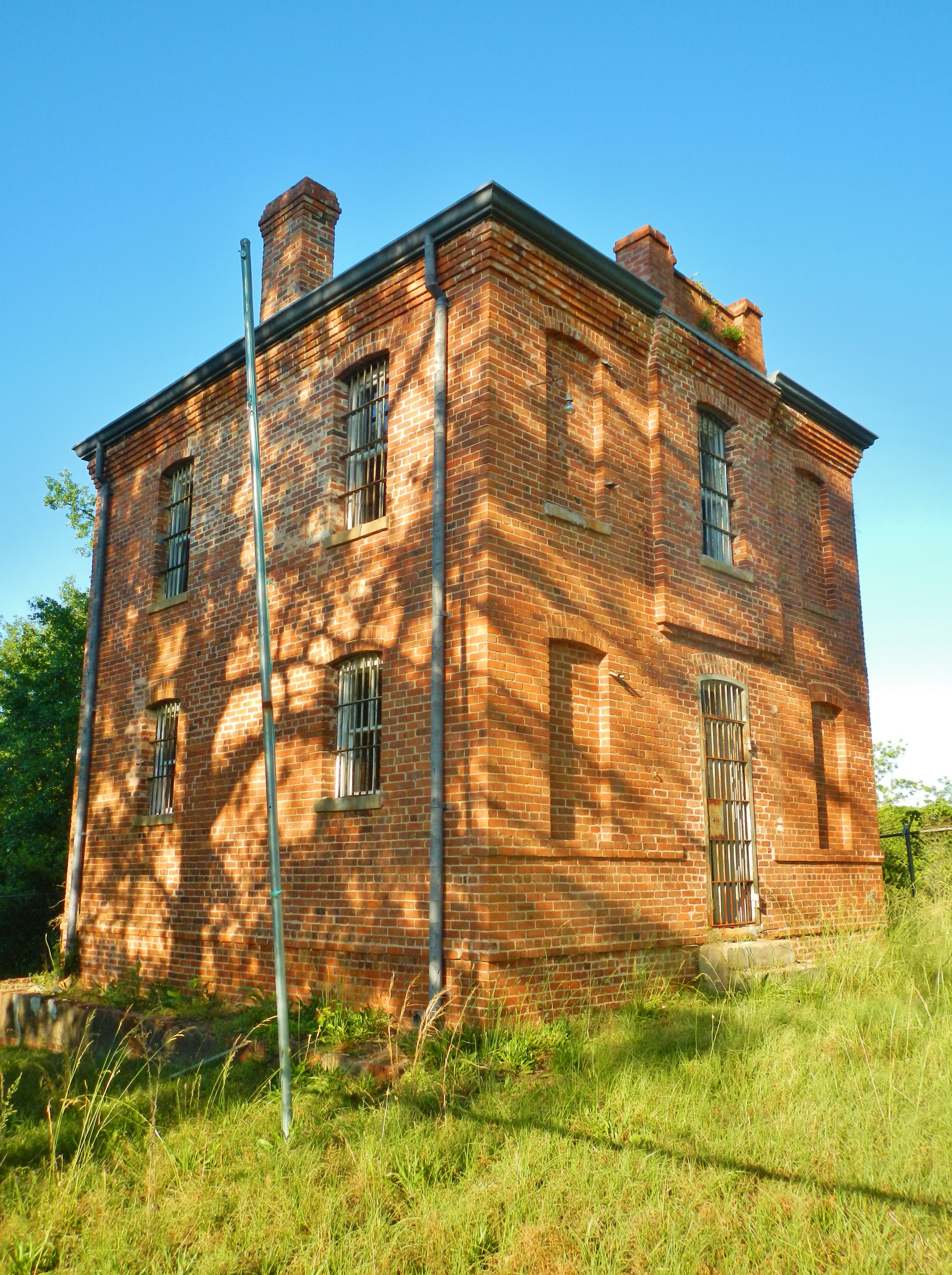

- Location within Georgia
- Location: Mt. Olive and Boyd Sts., Cusseta, Georgia
- Coordinates: 32.30668°N 84.77569°W
- Area: less than one acre
- Built: 1902
- Built by: Pauly Jail Co.
- Architectural style: Romanesque
- NRHP reference No.: 86000368
- Added to NRHP: March 13, 1986

Chattahoochee County Jail is a historic jail in Cusseta, Georgia. It was constructed in 1902 and opened in 1911. The jail replaced a two-story log jail built in 1855. It was built with some aspects of Romanesque architecture style. It was used until 1975. The jail was added to the National Register of Historic Places in 1986. It is located on Mt. Olive Street and Boyd Street.

It has been described as having features (brick construction, compact massing, simple detailing, and allusions to medieval architectural styles) that are characteristic of the many county jails built at the turn of the 20th century in Georgia. The two-story brick jail was built for $5,000 by the Pauly Jail and Manufacturing Company of St. Louis, Missouri.

It was being restored by the Chattahoochee County Historic Preservation Society.

It was deemed to be "a good example of a building built to be a county jail in a small county seat."

== See also ==
- National Register of Historic Places listings in Chattahoochee County, Georgia
