= Cusseta Industrial High School =

- U.S. National Register of Historic Places
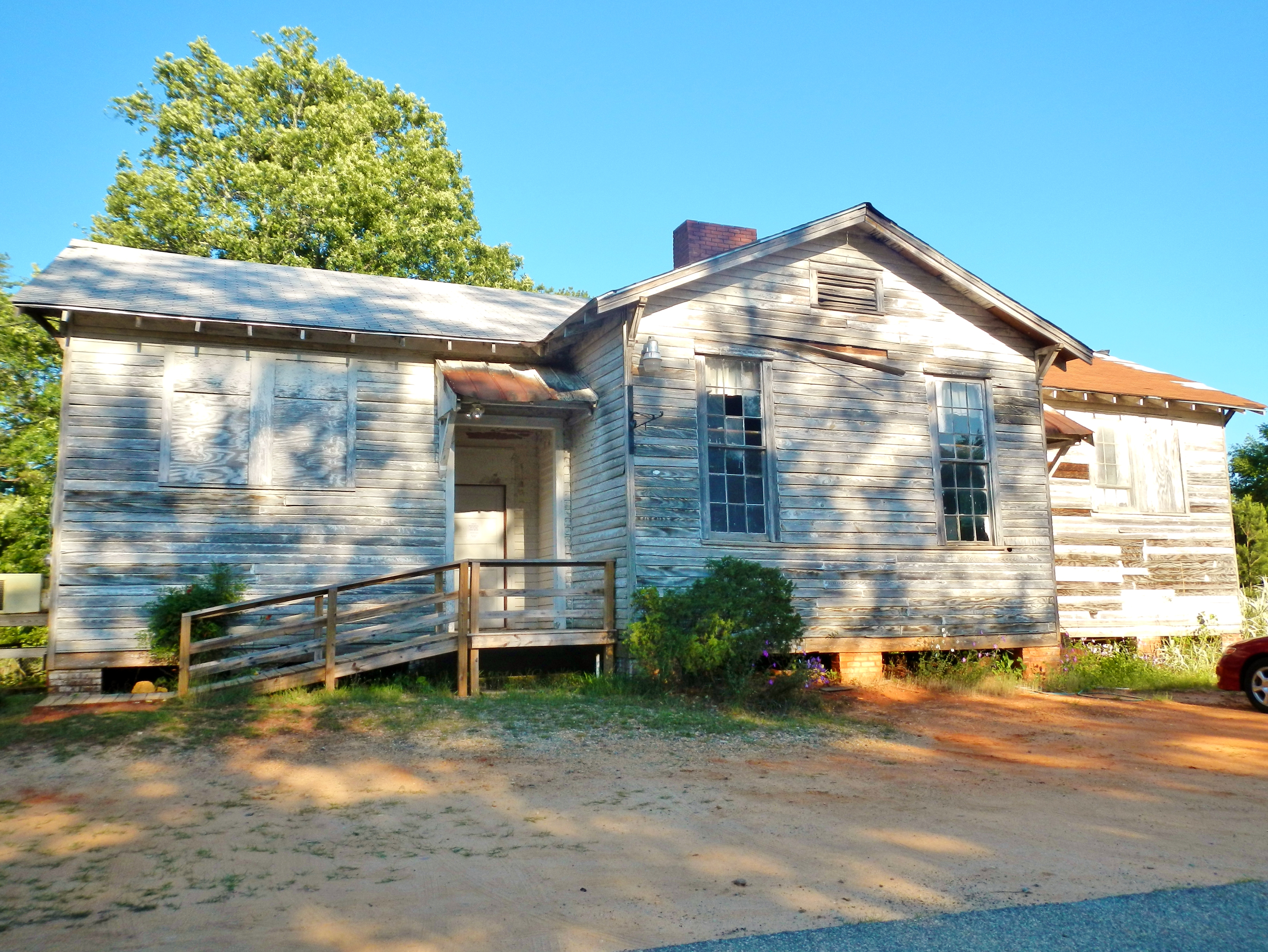

- Location within Georgia
- Location: 113 Sandy Rd., Cusseta, Georgia
- Coordinates: 32°18′02″N 84°46′21″W
- MPS: Rosenwald Schools in Georgia, 1912-1937 MPS
- NRHP reference No.: 11000184
- Added to NRHP: April 15, 2011

The Cusseta Industrial High School, at 113 Sandy Rd. in Cusseta, Georgia, is a Rosenwald School which was listed on the National Register of Historic Places in 2011.

It was then owned by the Chattahoochee County Historic Preservation Society, Inc. which sponsored the nomination.
