= Chattahoochee County, Georgia =

County in Georgia, United States

- County
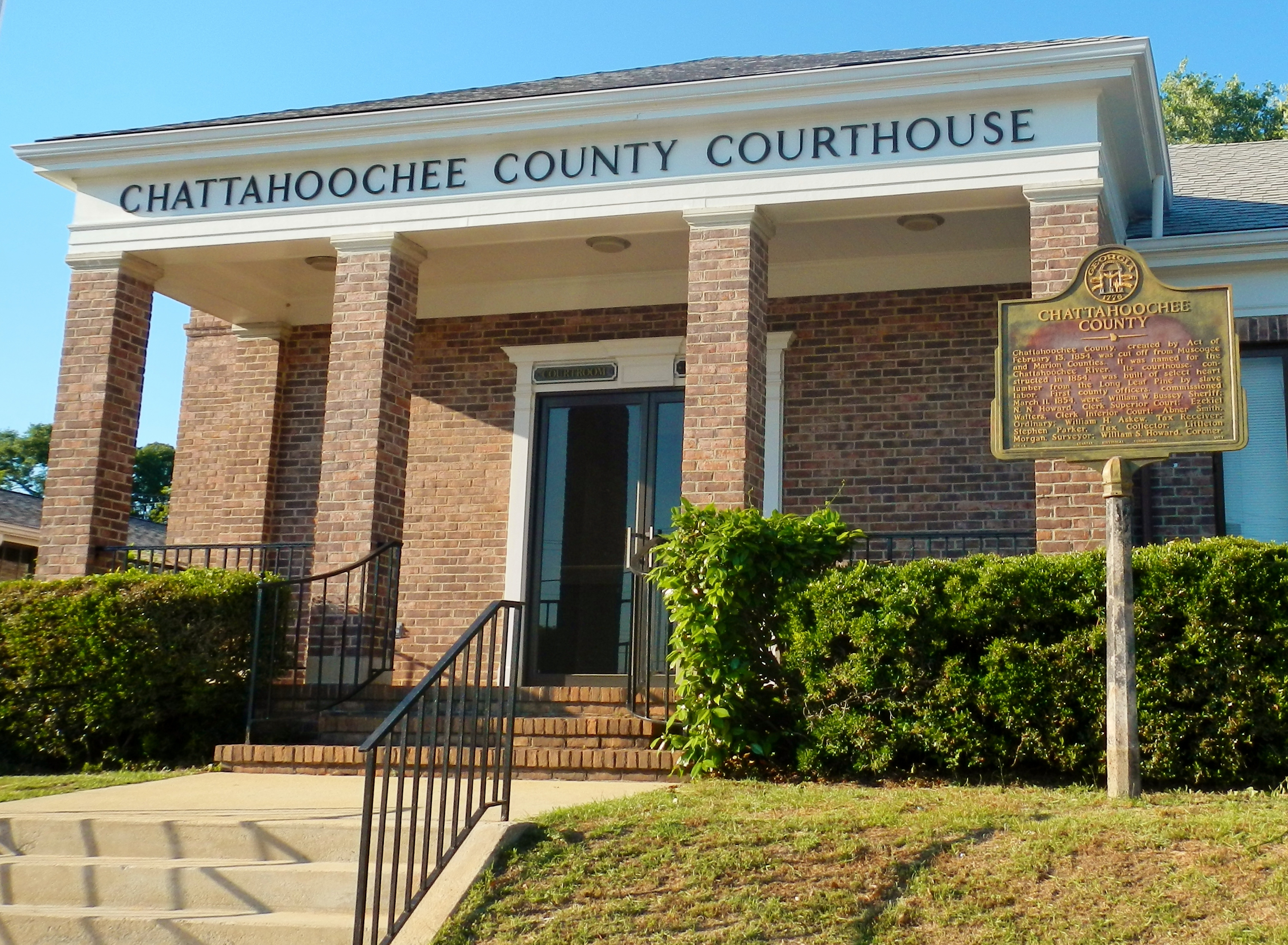
- Chattahoochee County Courthouse in Cusseta

- Seal

- Location within the U.S. state of Georgia
- Coordinates: 32°21′N 84°47′W
- Country: United States
- State: Georgia
- Founded: 1854; 172 years ago
- Named for: Chattahoochee River
- Seat: Cusseta
- Largest city: Cusseta

Area
  - Total: 251 sq mi (650 km^{2})
  - Land: 249 sq mi (640 km^{2})
  - Water: 2.4 sq mi (6.2 km^{2}) 1.0%

Population (2020)
  - Total: 9,565
  - Estimate (2025): 8,465 ▼
  - Density: 38.4/sq mi (14.8/km^{2})
- Time zone: UTC−5 (Eastern)
  - Summer (DST): UTC−4 (EDT)
- Congressional district: 2nd
- Website: ugoccc.com

Chattahoochee County, also known as Cusseta-Chattahoochee County, is a county located on the western border in central Georgia. As of the 2020 census, the population was 9,565. The county seat is Cusseta, with which the county shares a consolidated city-county government. The city of Cusseta remains a geographically distinct municipality within Chattahoochee County. The county was created on February 13, 1854. Chattahoochee County is included in the Columbus, Georgia metropolitan area.

== History ==
This area was occupied by the historic Muscogee people (also known as the Creek) at the time of European encounter. They had a large confederacy in the Southeast. They were among the Five Civilized Tribes who were forcibly removed to Indian Territory in the 1830s during the administration of President Andrew Jackson. European Americans moved into their former areas, in some cases acquiring land through lotteries run by the state.

The Georgia General Assembly created Chattahoochee County on February 13, 1854, from portions of Muscogee and Marion counties. It is named for the Chattahoochee River that forms its western boundary. The county seat was named Cusseta to commemorate the historic Creek Indian town of that name that long existed nearby. In 2004–2005, the U.S. Census Bureau reported a 6.2% population decline, making this county at the top of those nationally with shrinking populations.

The original courthouse, built in 1854 by enslaved African Americans, is preserved at the tourist attraction of Westville in Columbus, Georgia.

Since 1918, most of the land in Chattahoochee County has been part of the Fort Benning military reservation.

== Geography ==
According to the U.S. Census Bureau, the county has a total area of 251 square miles (650 km^{2}), of which 249 square miles (640 km^{2}) is land and 2.4 square miles (6.2 km^{2}) (1.0%) is water.

The vast majority of Chattahoochee County is located in the Middle Chattahoochee River-Walter F. George Lake subbasin of the ACF River Basin (Apalachicola-Chattahoochee-Flint River Basin). The very small southeastern corner of the county is located in the Kinchafoonee-Muckalee subbasin of the same larger ACF Basin. The county forms part of the West Georgia region.

=== Major highways ===
- U.S. Route 27 / State Route 1
- U.S. Route 280 / State Route 520
- State Route 26
- State Route 355

=== Adjacent counties ===
- Muscogee County (north)
- Talbot County (northeast)
- Marion County (east)
- Stewart County (south)
- Russell County, Alabama (which is west of the border of Central Standard Time border except for Phenix City, Alabama, a part of the Columbus Metropolitan Area)

== Communities ==
=== Cities ===
- Cusseta

=== Former census-designated places ===
- Fort Benning South (now part of Cusseta)

=== Unincorporated communities ===
- Ida Vesper

== Demographics ==
Historical population
Census	Pop.	Note	%±
1860	5,797		—
1870	6,059		4.5%
1880	5,670		−6.4%
1890	4,902		−13.5%
1900	5,790		18.1%
1910	5,586		−3.5%
1920	5,266		−5.7%
1930	8,894		68.9%
1940	15,138		70.2%
1950	12,149		−19.7%
1960	13,011		7.1%
1970	25,813		98.4%
1980	21,732		−15.8%
1990	16,934		−22.1%
2000	14,882		−12.1%
2010	11,267		−24.3%
2020	9,565		−15.1%
2025 (est.)	8,465	▼	−11.5%
U.S. Decennial Census; 1790-1880 1890-1910; 1920-1930 1930-1940; 1940-1950 1960-1980; 1980-2000 2010

=== Racial and ethnic composition ===
Chattahoochee County, Georgia – Racial and ethnic composition Note: the US Census treats Hispanic/Latino as an ethnic category. This table excludes Latinos from the racial categories and assigns them to a separate category. Hispanics/Latinos may be of any race.
Race / Ethnicity (NH = Non-Hispanic)	Pop 1980	Pop 1990	Pop 2000	Pop 2010	Pop 2020	% 1980	% 1990	% 2000	% 2010	% 2020
White alone (NH)	12,470	9,422	8,181	7,089	5,403	57.38%	55.64%	54.97%	62.92%	56.49%
Black or African American alone (NH)	6,948	5,140	4,353	2,047	1,463	31.97%	30.35%	29.25%	18.17%	15.30%
Native American or Alaska Native alone (NH)	204	97	101	67	35	0.94%	0.57%	0.68%	0.59%	0.37%
Asian alone (NH)	402	435	249	231	304	1.85%	2.57%	1.67%	2.05%	3.18%
Native Hawaiian or Pacific Islander alone (NH)	x	x	62	62	104	x	x	0.42%	0.55%	1.09%
Other race alone (NH)	179	47	33	13	55	0.82%	0.28%	0.22%	0.12%	0.58%
Mixed race or Multiracial (NH)	x	x	352	360	591	x	x	2.37%	3.20%	6.18%
Hispanic or Latino (any race)	1,529	1,793	1,551	1,398	1,610	7.04%	10.59%	10.42%	12.41%	16.83%
Total	21,732	16,934	14,882	11,267	9,565	100.00%	100.00%	100.00%	100.00%	100.00%

=== 2020 census ===
As of the 2020 census, the county had a population of 9,565, with 2,625 households and 1,886 families residing in the county. Of the residents, 24.7% were under the age of 18 and 4.8% were 65 years of age or older; the median age was 23.8 years. For every 100 females there were 155.7 males, and for every 100 females age 18 and over there were 180.8 males. 59.9% of residents lived in urban areas and 40.1% lived in rural areas.

The racial makeup of the county was 62.4% White, 15.8% Black or African American, 0.5% American Indian and Alaska Native, 3.2% Asian, 1.2% Native Hawaiian and Pacific Islander, 6.1% from some other race, and 10.9% from two or more races. Hispanic or Latino residents of any race comprised 16.8% of the population.

Among these households, 49.8% had children under the age of 18 living with them and 16.8% had a female householder with no spouse or partner present. About 21.2% of all households were made up of individuals and 4.6% had someone living alone who was 65 years of age or older.

There were 3,242 housing units, of which 19.0% were vacant. Among occupied housing units, 27.0% were owner-occupied and 73.0% were renter-occupied. The homeowner vacancy rate was 3.3% and the rental vacancy rate was 13.1%.

== Education ==
The Chattahoochee County School District holds pre-school to grade twelve, and consists of one elementary school, a middle school, and a high school. The district has 85 full-time teachers and over 1000 students.

- Chattahoochee County Education Center
- Chattahoochee County Middle School
- Chattahoochee County High School

All parts of the county except Fort Benning are zoned to county schools for all grades. Fort Benning children are zoned to Department of Defense Education Activity (DoDEA) schools for grades K-8. However Fort Benning high school students attend the public high schools in the respective counties they are located in.

== Politics ==
As of the 2020s, Chattahoochee County is a Republican stronghold, voting 58% for Donald Trump in 2024. For elections to the United States House of Representatives, Chattahoochee County is part of Georgia's 2nd congressional district, currently represented by Sanford Bishop. For elections to the Georgia State Senate, Chattahoochee County is part of District 15. For elections to the Georgia House of Representatives, Chattahoochee County is part of District 151.

United States presidential election results for Chattahoochee County, Georgia
Year	Republican		Democratic		Third party(ies)	
Year	No.	%	No.	%	No.	%
1912	11	7.38%	137	91.95%	1	0.67%
1916	4	2.42%	156	94.55%	5	3.03%
1920	5	5.43%	87	94.57%	0	0.00%
1924	14	6.17%	208	91.63%	5	2.20%
1928	18	11.32%	141	88.68%	0	0.00%
1932	1	0.53%	186	99.47%	0	0.00%
1936	20	8.85%	206	91.15%	0	0.00%
1940	20	8.93%	204	91.07%	0	0.00%
1944	19	15.97%	100	84.03%	0	0.00%
1948	1	0.86%	46	39.66%	69	59.48%
1952	73	38.62%	116	61.38%	0	0.00%
1956	43	28.67%	107	71.33%	0	0.00%
1960	66	25.78%	190	74.22%	0	0.00%
1964	246	56.29%	191	43.71%	0	0.00%
1968	70	13.44%	148	28.41%	303	58.16%
1972	345	74.03%	121	25.97%	0	0.00%
1976	178	26.02%	506	73.98%	0	0.00%
1980	256	34.04%	476	63.30%	20	2.66%
1984	459	51.75%	428	48.25%	0	0.00%
1988	454	55.57%	362	44.31%	1	0.12%
1992	413	34.47%	604	50.42%	181	15.11%
1996	398	36.78%	565	52.22%	119	11.00%
2000	590	48.88%	600	49.71%	17	1.41%
2004	905	53.55%	773	45.74%	12	0.71%
2008	811	48.97%	830	50.12%	15	0.91%
2012	735	49.23%	729	48.83%	29	1.94%
2016	751	54.03%	594	42.73%	45	3.24%
2020	880	55.63%	667	42.16%	35	2.21%
2024	982	57.97%	703	41.50%	9	0.53%

United States Senate election results for Chattahoochee County, Georgia2
Year	Republican		Democratic		Third party(ies)	
Year	No.	%	No.	%	No.	%
2020	850	54.91%	636	41.09%	62	4.01%
2020	716	54.16%	606	45.84%	0	0.00%

United States Senate election results for Chattahoochee County, Georgia3
Year	Republican		Democratic		Third party(ies)	
Year	No.	%	No.	%	No.	%
2020	388	25.29%	410	26.73%	736	47.98%
2020	720	54.50%	601	45.50%	0	0.00%
2022	538	53.00%	453	44.63%	24	2.36%
2022	468	51.88%	434	48.12%	0	0.00%

Georgia Gubernatorial election results for Chattahoochee County
Year	Republican		Democratic		Third party(ies)	
Year	No.	%	No.	%	No.	%
2022	583	57.16%	427	41.86%	10	0.98%

== See also ==
- National Register of Historic Places listings in Chattahoochee County, Georgia
- List of counties in Georgia
