= Riverside (Fort Moore, Georgia) =

Historic house in Georgia, United States

- U.S. National Register of Historic Places
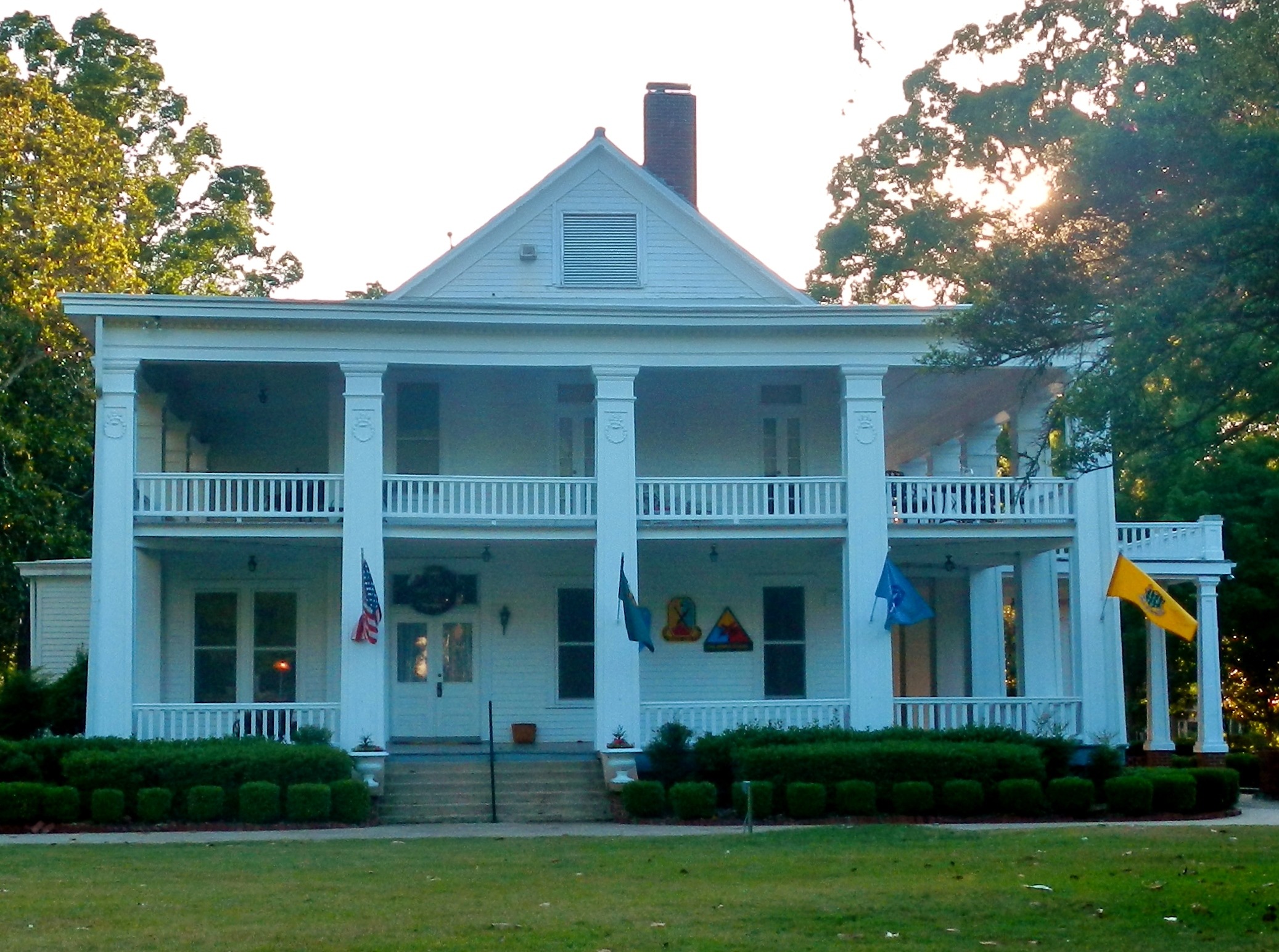

- Location within Georgia Location within the United States
- Location: 100 Vibbert Ave., Fort Benning, Georgia
- Coordinates: 32°22′1″N 84°57′34″W
- Area: 0 acres (0 ha)
- Built: 1910
- NRHP reference No.: 71000272
- Added to NRHP: May 27, 1971

Riverside is a historic property in Fort Benning, Georgia. The residence has been home to the fort's commandants. It was completed in 1909. The house includes a kitchen moved to its present location on logs. Riverside was added to the National Register of Historic Places on May 27, 1971. It is located at 100 Vibbert Avenue.

== See also ==
- National Register of Historic Places listings in Chattahoochee County, Georgia
