= Fort Benning South, Georgia =

- CDP
- Location in Chattahoochee County and the state of Georgia
- Coordinates: 32°21′36″N 84°56′4″W
- Country: United States
- State: Georgia
- County: Chattahoochee

Area
  - Total: 8.7 sq mi (22.5 km^{2})
  - Land: 8.6 sq mi (22.2 km^{2})
  - Water: 0.12 sq mi (0.3 km^{2})

Population (2000)
  - Total: 11,737
  - Density: 1,351/sq mi (521.6/km^{2})
- Time zone: UTC-5 (Eastern (EST))
  - Summer (DST): UTC-4 (EDT)
- FIPS code: 13-30795

Fort Benning South is a former census-designated place (CDP) in Chattahoochee County, Georgia, United States. It is part of the Columbus, Georgia-Alabama metropolitan statistical area. The population was 11,737 at last official census (2000). The area is now part of consolidated Cusseta–Chattahoochee County.

== Geography ==
Fort Benning South is located at 32°21′36″N 84°56′4″W (32.359866, -84.934566).

According to the United States Census Bureau, the CDP has a total area of 8.7 square miles (23 km^{2}), of which 8.6 square miles (22 km^{2}) is land and 0.1 square miles (0.26 km^{2}) (1.49%) is water.

== Demographics ==
Historical population
Census	Pop.	Note	%±
1970	27,495		—
1980	15,074		−45.2%
1990	14,617		−3.0%
2000	11,737		−19.7%

At the census of 2000, there were 11,737 people, 1,852 households, and 1,816 families residing in the CDP. The population density was 1,368.0 inhabitants per square mile (528.2/km^{2}). There were 2,028 housing units at an average density of 236.4 per square mile (91.3/km^{2}). The racial makeup of the CDP was 56.82% White, 29.17% African American, 0.90% Native American, 2.08% Asian, 0.46% Pacific Islander, 6.17% from other races, and 4.40% from two or more races. Hispanic or Latinos of any race were 12.45% of the population.

There were 1,852 households, out of which 81.5% had children under the age of 18 living with them, 90.3% were married couples living together, 5.8% had a female householder with no husband present, and 1.9% were non-families. 1.7% of all households were made up of individuals, and none had someone living alone who was 65 years of age or older. The average household size was 3.85 and the average family size was 3.88.

In the CDP, the population was spread out, with 28.8% under the age of 18, 32.0% from 18 to 24, 37.3% from 25 to 44, 1.7% from 45 to 64, and 0.1% who were 65 years of age or older. The median age was 22 years. For every 100 females, there were 193.3 males. For every 100 females age 18 and over, there were 262.3 males.

The median income for a household in the CDP was $41,483, and the median income for a family was $40,913. Males had a median income of $21,367 versus $20,463 for females. The per capita income for the CDP was $13,789. About 5.0% of families and 6.4% of the population were below the poverty line, including 7.8% of those under age 18 and none of those age 65 or over.
