= 2008 Georgia Republican presidential primary =

- February 5, 2008

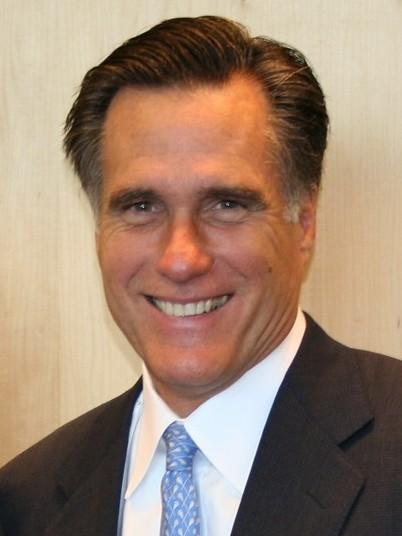
Candidate	Mike Huckabee	John McCain	Mitt Romney
Home state	Arkansas	Arizona	Massachusetts
Delegate count	45	3	0
Popular vote	326,874	304,751	290,707
Percentage	33.92%	31.63%	30.17%
- County results Mike Huckabee Huckabee: 30–40% 40–50% 50–60% John McCain McCain: 30–40% 40–50% Mitt Romney Romney: 30–40% 40–50%

The 2008 Georgia Republican presidential primary took place on February 5, 2008 (Super Tuesday), with 72 national delegates at stake. Mike Huckabee was the winner of the primary.

== Results ==
Official Results
Candidate	Votes	Percentage	Delegates
Mike Huckabee	326,874	33.92%	45
John McCain	304,751	31.63%	3
Mitt Romney	290,707	30.17%	0
Ron Paul	28,096	2.92%	0
Rudy Giuliani*	7,162	0.74%	0
Fred Thompson*	3,414	0.35%	0
Alan Keyes	1,158	0.15%	0
Duncan Hunter*	755	0.08%	0
Tom Tancredo*	324	0.03%	0
Total	963,541	100%	48

* Candidate dropped out of the race before the primary

== See also ==
- Republican Party (United States) presidential primaries, 2008
- Georgia Democratic primary, 2008
