= 2008 Georgia Democratic presidential primary =

- February 5, 2008

102 Democratic National Convention delegates (87 pledged, 15 unpledged) The number of pledged delegates received is determined by the popular vote

Candidate	Barack Obama	Hillary Clinton
Home state	Illinois	New York
Delegate count	60	27
Popular vote	704,247	330,026
Percentage	66.39%	31.11%
- Primary results by county Clinton: 40–50% 50–60% 60–70% 70–80% 80–90% Obama: 40–50% 50–60% 60–70% 70–80% 80–90%

The 2008 Georgia Democratic presidential primary took place on Super Tuesday, February 5, 2008, and had a total of 87 delegates at stake. The winner in each of Georgia's 13 congressional districts was awarded all of that district's delegates, totaling 57. Another 30 delegates were awarded to the statewide winner, Barack Obama. The 87 delegates represented Georgia at the Democratic National Convention in Denver, Colorado. Sixteen other unpledged delegates, known as superdelegates, also attended the convention and cast their votes as well.

== Results ==
Georgia Democratic Presidential Primary Results – 2008
Party	Candidate	Votes	Percentage	Delegates
Democratic	Barack Obama	704,247	66.39%	60
Democratic	Hillary Clinton	330,026	31.11%	27
Democratic	John Edwards	18,209	1.72%	0
Democratic	Joe Biden	2,538	0.24%	0
Democratic	Dennis Kucinich	2,096	0.20%	0
Democratic	Bill Richardson	1,879	0.18%	0
Democratic	Mike Gravel	952	0.09%	0
Democratic	Christopher Dodd	904	0.09%	0
Totals		1,060,851	100.00%	87
Voter turnout		%		—

== Analysis ==
Georgia, with its heavily African American population, gave Barack Obama one of his largest victories in a primary during the course of the Democratic Presidential Primary as he solidly defeated Hillary Clinton by more than a two-to-one margin of victory. According to exit polls, 51 percent of voters in the Georgia Democratic Primary were African Americans and they opted for Obama by a margin of 88-11 compared to the 43 percent of Caucasian voters who backed Clinton by a margin of 53-43. Obama won all age groups, educational attainment levels and socioeconomic classes in Georgia except senior citizens aged 65 and over who backed Clinton by a margin of 55-45. Obama won all ideological groups and self-identified Democrats by a margin of 67-32 and Independents by a similar 63-33 percent margin of victory. Obama also swept every major religious denomination – Protestants went for Obama 52-46; Roman Catholics 56-44; other Christians 77-22; other religions 71-24; and atheists/agnostics 69-30.

Obama performed extremely well throughout the state of Georgia and won over three-quarters of its counties. He performed best in Atlanta where he won 76 percent of the vote as well as its suburbs which backed him 66-32. Central Georgia also strongly favored Obama by a margin of 69-31. Obama did best in the state’s major urban areas like Atlanta, Savannah, Columbus, Augusta, and Athens as well as a majority of the rural counties that were predominantly African American. Clinton performed extremely well in North Georgia, mostly in the more rural, white and conservative parts of the state which are considered to be an extreme part of Appalachia, a region where she consistently did well during the course of the primaries; she defeated Obama by a margin of 48-45 percent in North Georgia.

Obama received a major endorsement from U.S. Representative John Lewis of Atlanta, a former civil rights activist.

== See also ==
- 2008 Georgia Republican presidential primary
