= Cusseta, Georgia =

Cusseta
- Consolidated city-county
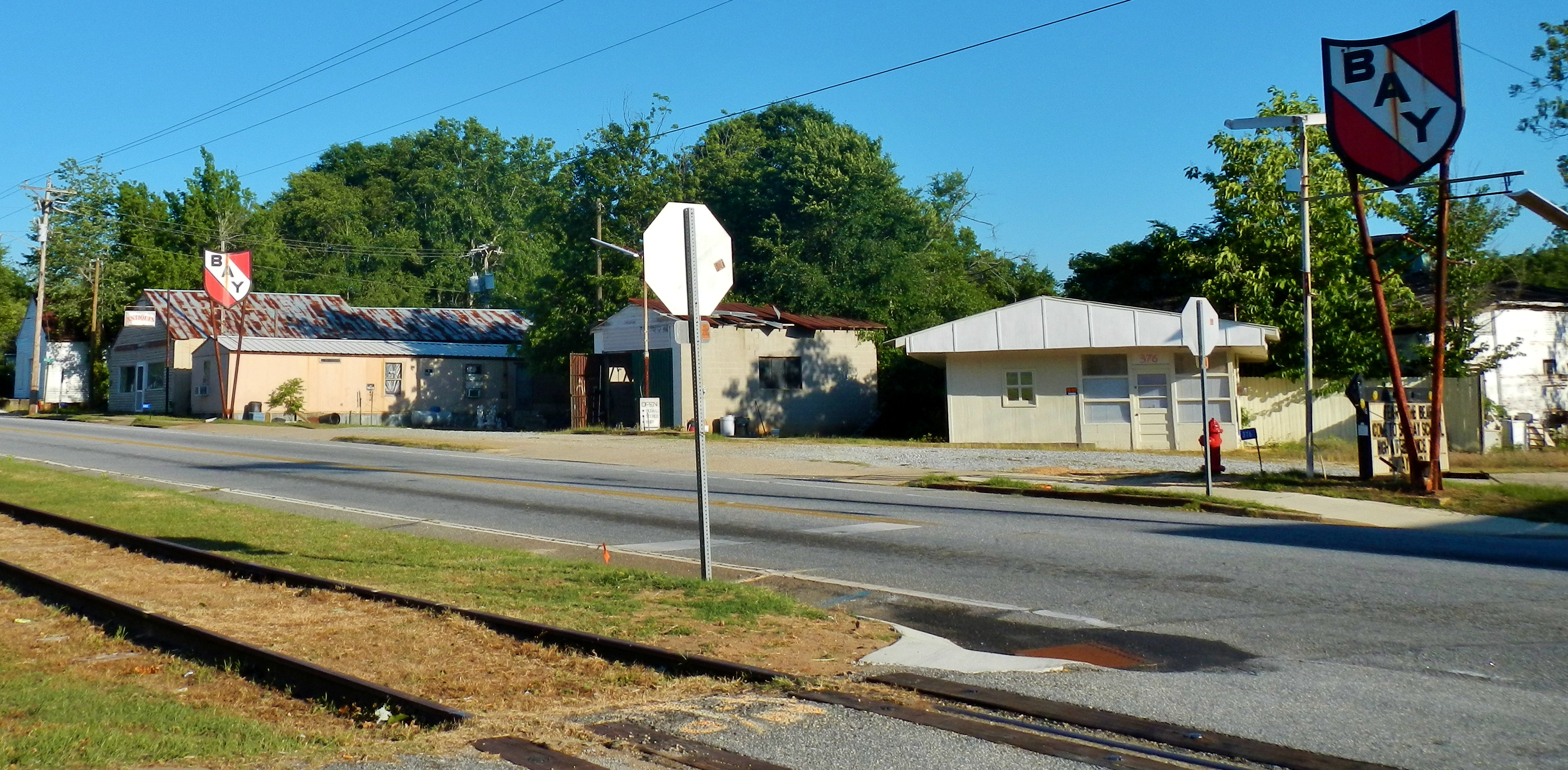
- Cusseta in 2012

- Seal

- Location of pre-consolidation boundary in Chattahoochee County and the state of Georgia
- Coordinates: 32°18′20″N 84°46′37″W
- Country: United States
- State: Georgia
- County: Chattahoochee
- Seat: Cusseta

Government
  - Type: City-County Consolidation

Area
  - Total: 251.16 sq mi (650.50 km^{2})
  - Land: 248.74 sq mi (644.23 km^{2})
  - Water: 2.42 sq mi (6.28 km^{2})
- Elevation: 531 ft (162 m)

Population (2020)
  - Total: 9,565
  - Density: 38.5/sq mi (14.85/km^{2})
- Time zone: UTC-5 (Eastern (EST))
  - Summer (DST): UTC-4 (EDT)
- ZIP code: 31805
- Area code: 706
- FIPS code: 13-21016
- Website: cusseta.georgia.gov

Cusseta (/kəˈsiːtə/ kə-SEET-ə) is a city in Chattahoochee County, Georgia, United States. It is part of the Columbus, Georgia metropolitan area. The population was 9,565 in 2020. The city is the county seat of Chattahoochee County, with which it shares a consolidated city-county government. Despite this, Cusseta is not coterminous with the county; it remains a geographically distinct municipality within the county.

== History ==
Chattahoochee County was created by an act of the Georgia General Assembly on February 13, 1854. It was formed from portions of Muscogee and Marion counties and named for the river that forms its western boundary. The act appointed five commissioners to choose a site for the county seat, which they named Cusseta to commemorate the Creek Indian town that used to exist nearby.

The original courthouse is preserved at the tourist attraction of Westville in Columbus, Georgia.

Cusseta was incorporated as a city on December 22, 1855. It is still the only incorporated city in Chattahoochee County.

Cusseta briefly prided itself on having the world's tallest man-made structure, the WTVM/WRBL-TV & WVRK-FM Tower, a guyed transmission tower built in 1962 about one mile from the city. However, it was surpassed only one year later by the KVLY-TV mast in Fargo, North Dakota.

In 2003, the city and county formed a consolidated Cusseta-Chattahoochee County government.

== Geography ==
Cusseta is located at 32°18′20″N 84°46′37″W (32.305451, -84.776929). The city is located southeast of Columbus, Georgia along U.S. Route 280, Georgia State Route 520 (known as South Georgia Parkway), and U.S. Route 27. The three highways run northwest 18 miles (29 km) to Columbus. U.S. Route 280 and Georgia 520 separate from U.S. Route 27 in the city, with U.S. 280 and Georgia 520 running south and east 43 miles (69 km) to Americus and 69 miles (111 km) to Albany. Other highways such as Georgia State Route 26, Georgia State Route 137, and Georgia State Route 355 pass through or begin in the city.

According to the United States Census Bureau, the city has a total area of 1.5 square miles (3.9 km^{2}), of which 1.5 square miles (3.9 km^{2}) is land and 0.66% is water.

A portion of Fort Benning is in the city.

== Demographics ==
Historical population
Census	Pop.	Note	%±
1870	216		—
1880	166		−23.1%
1890	241		45.2%
1900	301		24.9%
1910	341		13.3%
1920	276		−19.1%
1930	343		24.3%
1940	357		4.1%
1950	571		59.9%
1960	768		34.5%
1970	1,251		62.9%
1980	1,218		−2.6%
1990	1,107		−9.1%
2000	1,196		8.0%
2010	11,267		842.1%
2020	9,565		−15.1%
2023 (est.)	8,661		−9.5%
U.S. Decennial Census

According to the 2000 U.S. census, there were 1,196 people, 436 households, and 316 families residing in the city. By the 2020 census, its population was 9,565, down from 11,267 in 2010.

== Education ==
=== Chattahoochee County School District ===
The Chattahoochee County School District holds pre-school to grade twelve, and consists of one elementary school, a middle school, and a high school. The district has 85 full-time teachers and over 1000 students.

- Chattahoochee County Education Center
- Chattahoochee County Middle School
- Chattahoochee County High School

== Gallery ==
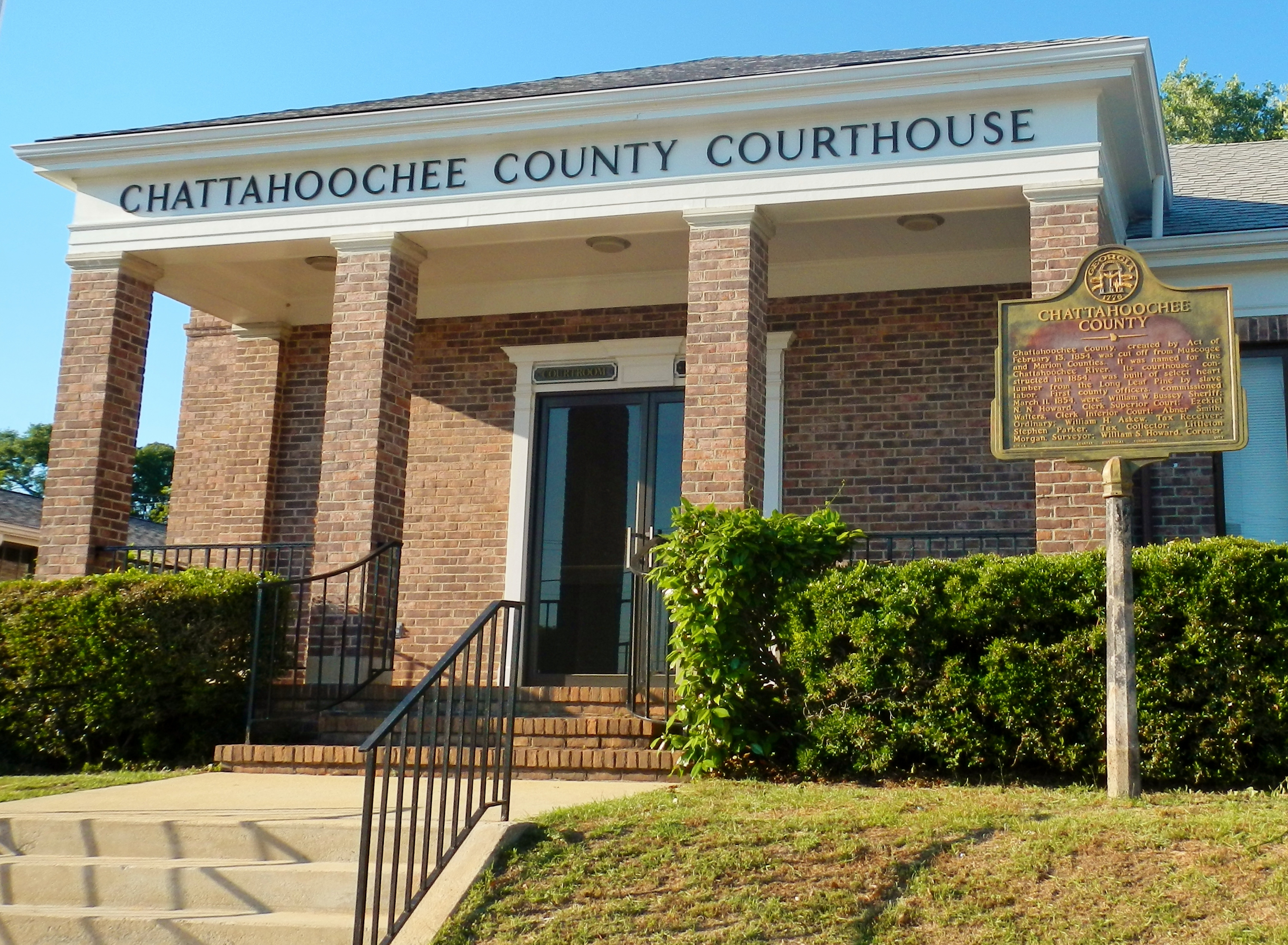
The Chattahoochee County Courthouse is located in Cusseta, the county seat.

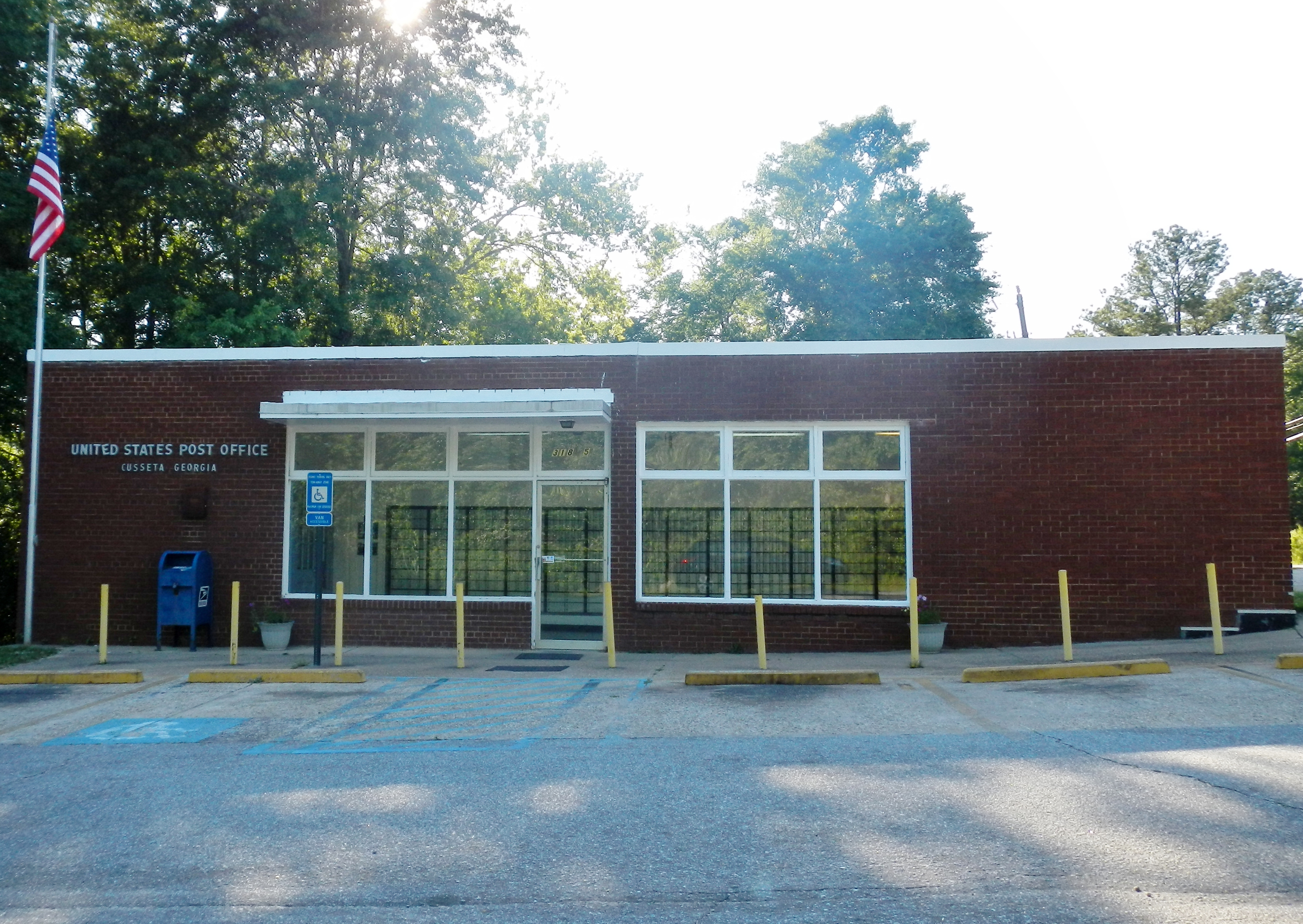
Cusseta Post Office (ZIP code: 31805)

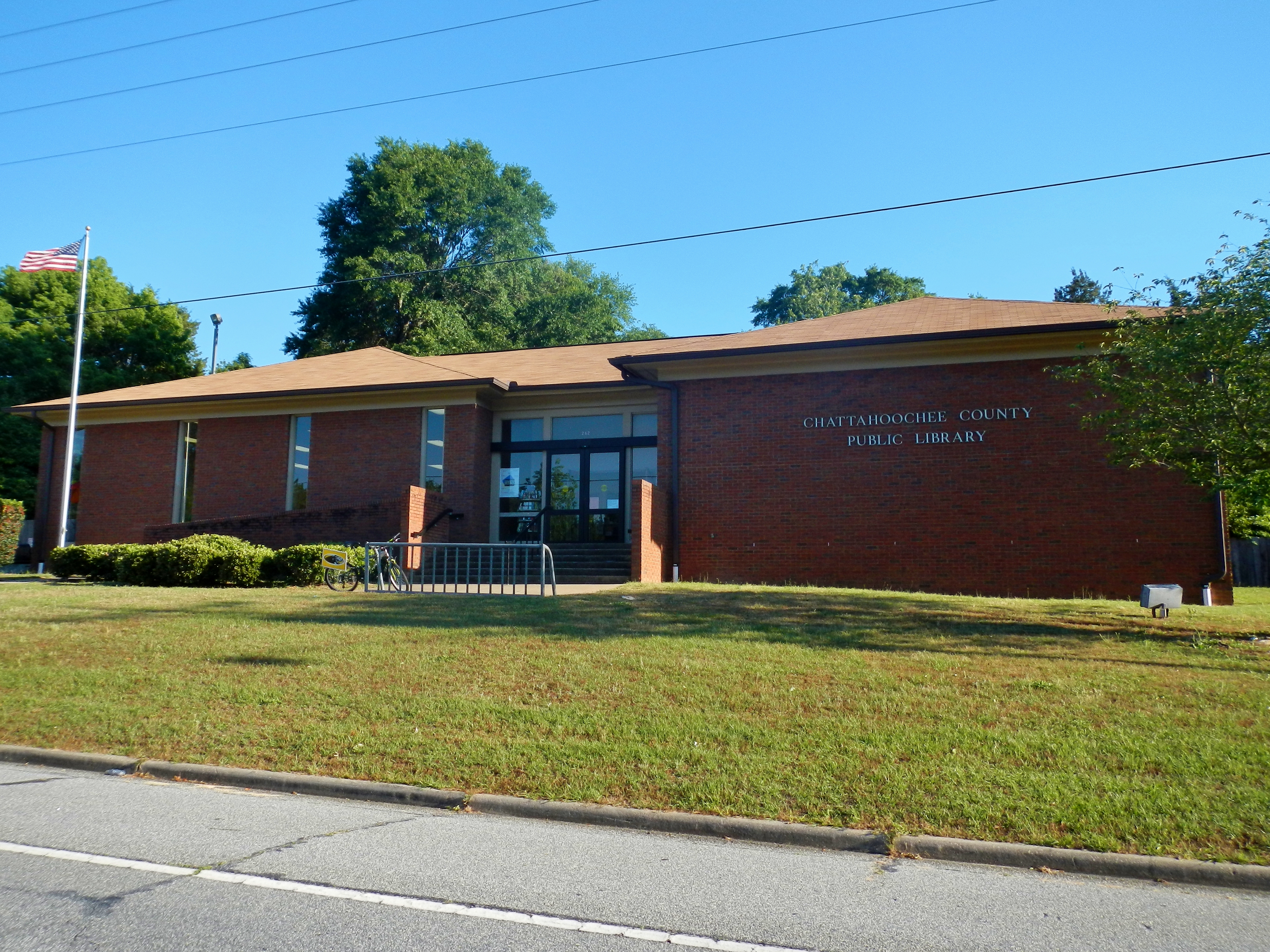
Chattahoochee County Public Library

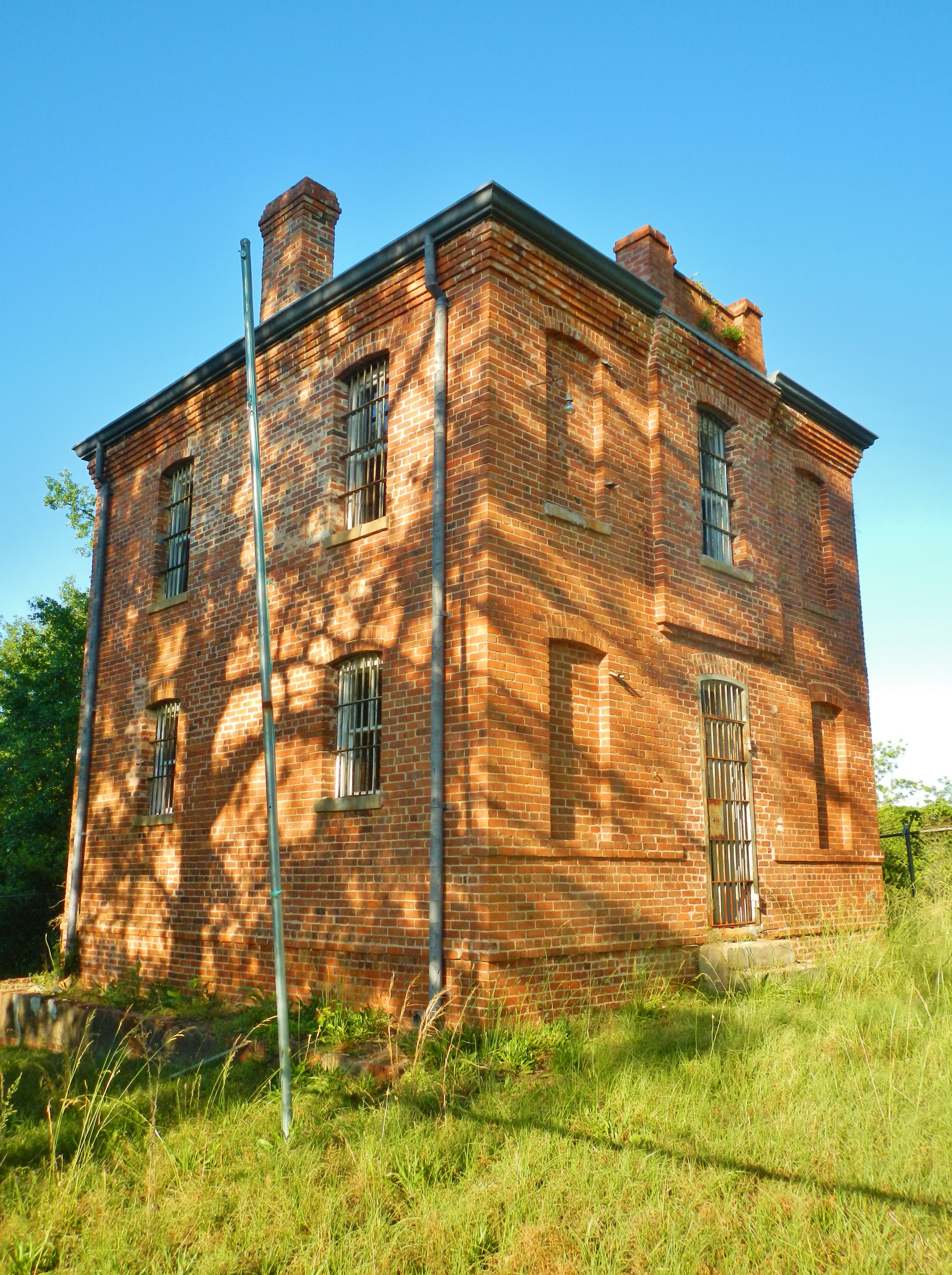
Constructed in Cusseta in 1902, this two-story fireproof jail facility served the county until 1975. It is listed on the National Register of Historic Places on March 13, 1986.

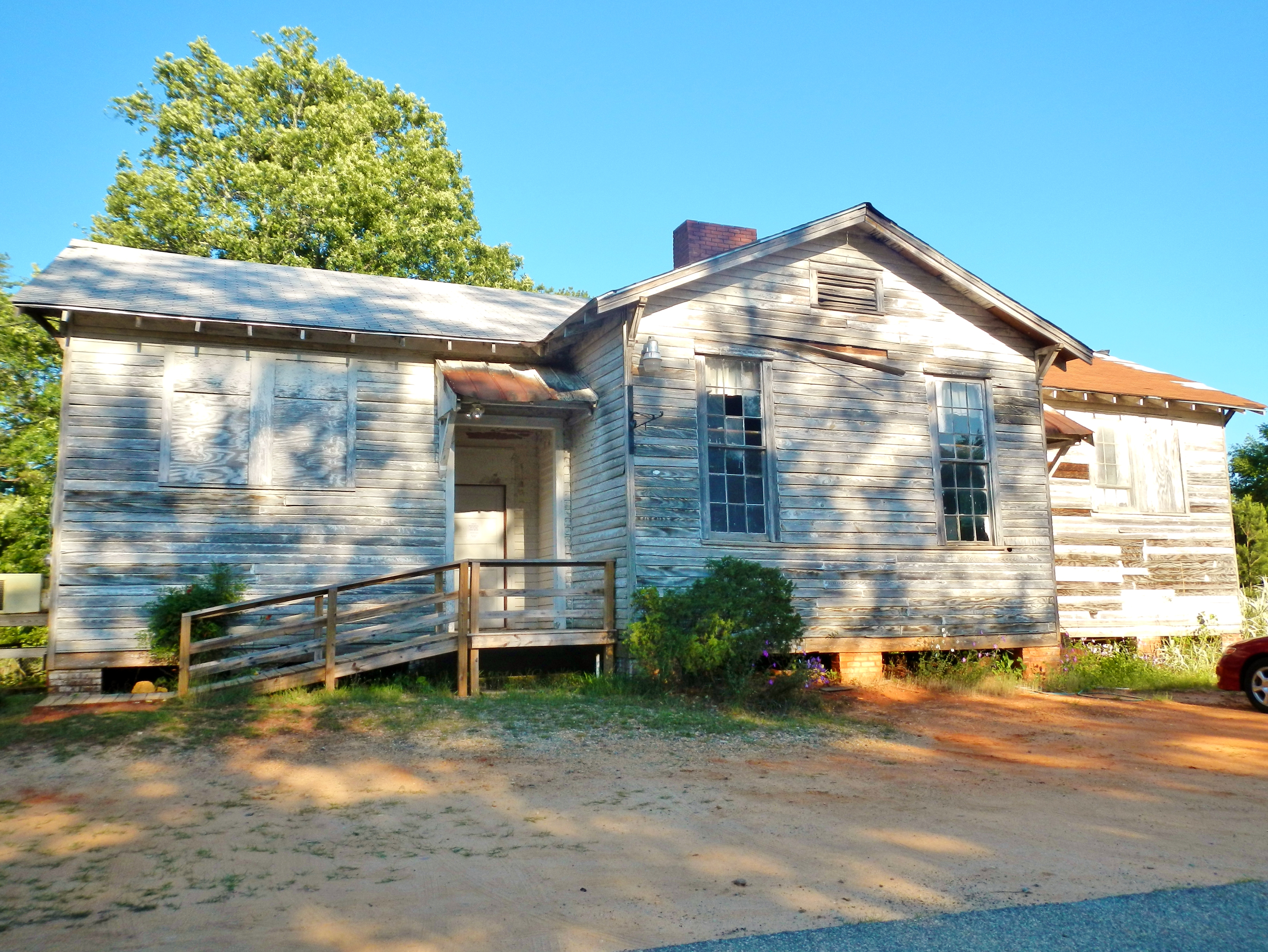
The Cusseta Industrial High School is a Rosenwald School constructed from 1929 to 1930. It is

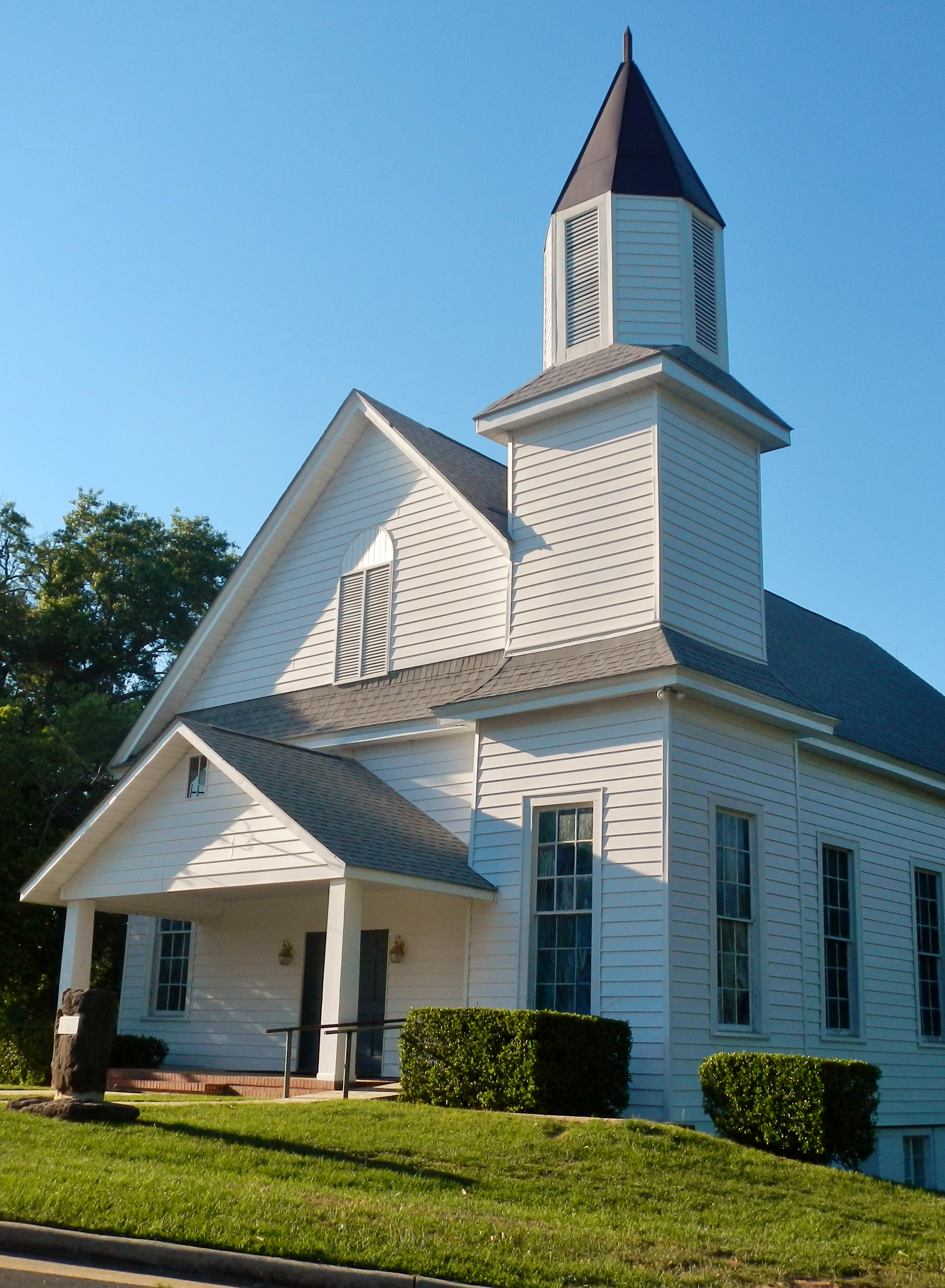
Cusseta First Baptist Church, the oldest church in Cusseta, was established in 1839.

== See also ==
- WTVM/WRBL-TV & WVRK-FM Tower
