= Andrew Carnegie =

American industrialist and philanthropist (1835–1919)

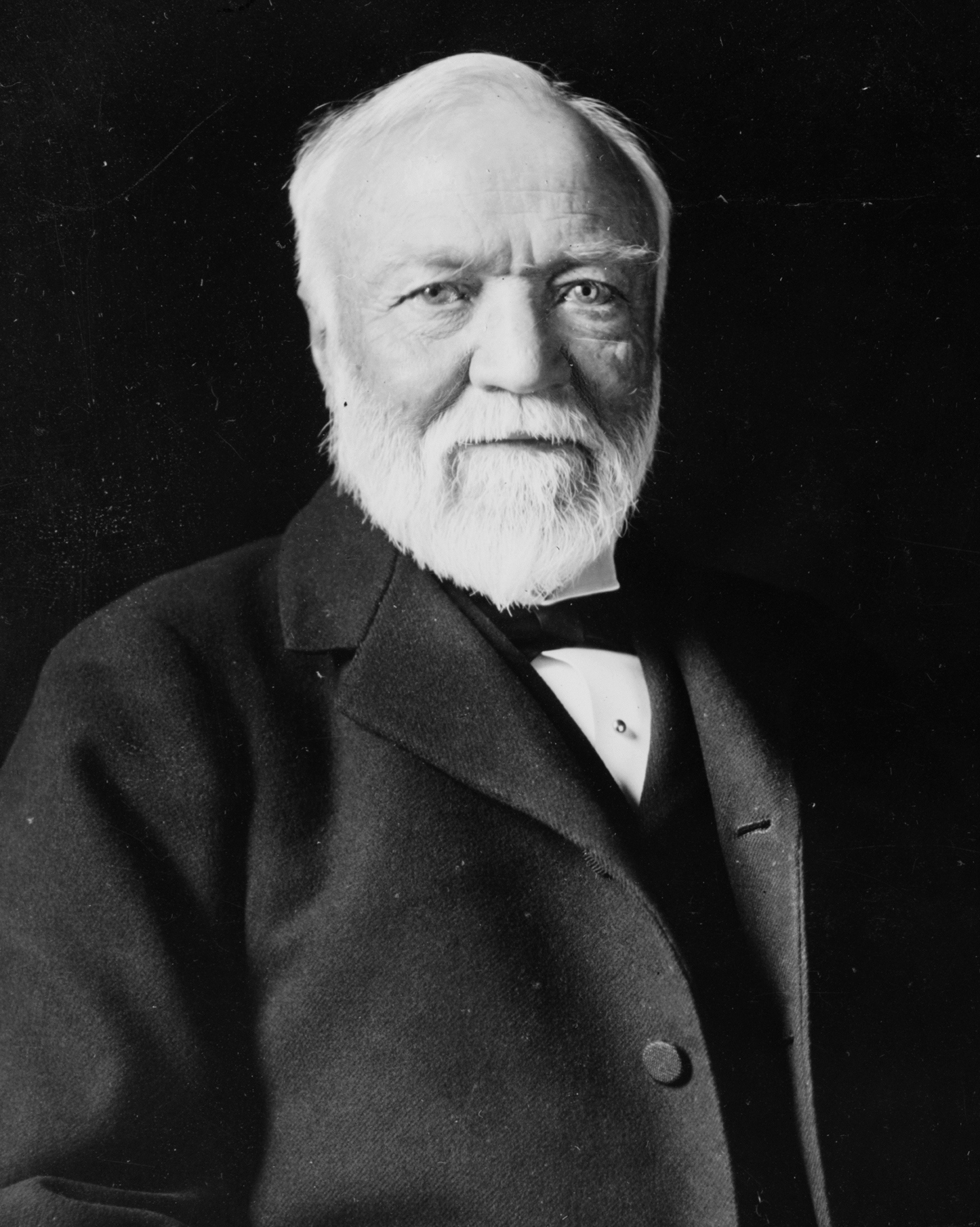
- Carnegie, c. 1913
- Born: November 25, 1835; Dunfermline, Fife, Scotland
- Died: August 11, 1919 (aged 83); Lenox, Massachusetts, U.S.
- Resting place: Sleepy Hollow Cemetery, Sleepy Hollow, New York, U.S.
- Occupations: Industrialist; philanthropist
- Known for: Founding and leading the Carnegie Steel Company Founding the Carnegie Library, Carnegie Hall, Carnegie Institution for Science, Carnegie Corporation of New York, Carnegie Endowment for International Peace, Carnegie Mellon University, Carnegie Trust for the Universities of Scotland, Carnegie United Kingdom Trust, Carnegie Foundation for the Advancement of Teaching, Carnegie Council for Ethics in International Affairs, Carnegie Museums of Pittsburgh, and the Carnegie Hero Fund
- Political party: Republican
- Spouse: Louise Whitfield (m. 1887)
- Children: Margaret Carnegie Miller
- Parent(s): William Carnegie; Margaret Morrison Carnegie
- Relatives: Carnegie family; George Lauder Jr. (first cousin); George Lauder Sr. (uncle)

Andrew Carnegie (Note: /kɑːrˈneɪɡi/ kar-NAY-gee, also /ˈkɑːrnəɡi/ KAR-nə-gee) (November 25, 1835 – August 11, 1919) was a Scottish-American industrialist and philanthropist. Carnegie led the expansion of the American steel industry in the late-19th century and became one of the richest Americans in history.

He became a leading philanthropist in the United States, Great Britain, and the British Empire. During the last 18 years of his life, he gave away around $350 million (equivalent to $6.9 billion in 2025 dollars), almost 90 percent of his fortune, to charities, foundations and universities. His 1889 article proclaiming "The Gospel of Wealth" called on the rich to use their wealth to improve society, expressed support for progressive taxation and an estate tax, and stimulated a wave of philanthropy.

Carnegie was born in Dunfermline, Scotland. He immigrated to what is now Pittsburgh, Pennsylvania, with his parents in 1848 at the age of 12. Carnegie started work in a cotton mill and later worked as a telegrapher. By the 1860s, he had investments in railroads, railroad sleeping cars, bridges, and oil derricks. He accumulated further wealth as a bond salesman, raising money for American enterprise in Europe. He built Pittsburgh's Carnegie Steel Company, which he sold to J. P. Morgan in 1901 for $303,450,000; it formed the basis of the U.S. Steel Corporation. After selling Carnegie Steel, he surpassed John D. Rockefeller as the richest American of the time.

Carnegie devoted the remainder of his life to large-scale philanthropy, with special emphasis on building local libraries, working for world peace, education, and scientific research. He funded Carnegie Hall in New York City, the Peace Palace in The Hague, founded the Carnegie Corporation of New York, Carnegie Endowment for International Peace, Carnegie Institution for Science, Carnegie Trust for the Universities of Scotland, Carnegie Hero Fund, Carnegie Mellon University, and the Carnegie Museums of Pittsburgh, among others.

== Biography ==
=== Early life ===
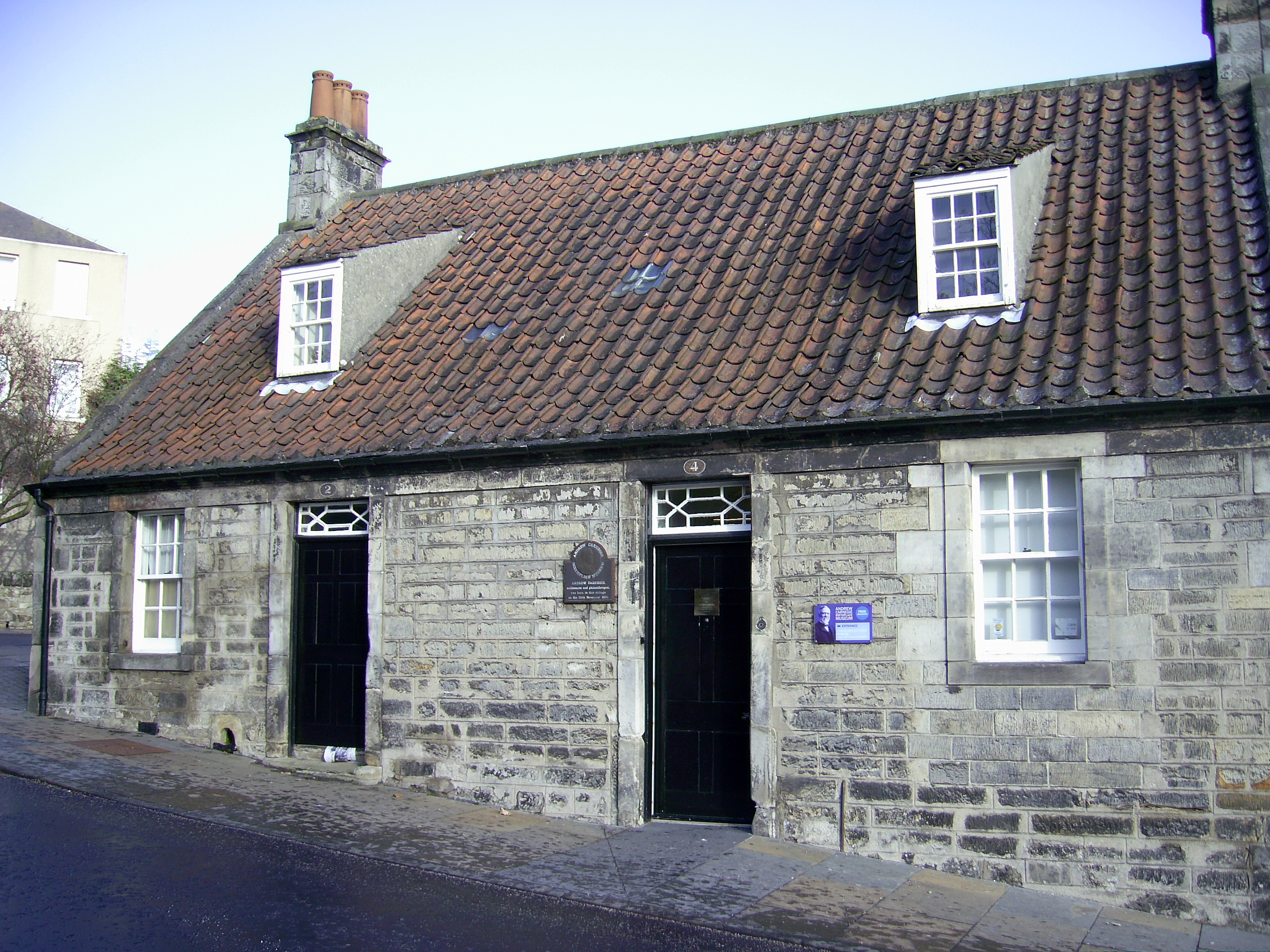
Birthplace of Andrew Carnegie in Dunfermline, Scotland

Andrew Carnegie was born to William Carnegie and Margaret (Morrison) Carnegie in Dunfermline, Scotland, in a typical weaver's cottage with only one main room. It consisted of half the ground floor, which was shared with the neighboring weaver's family. The main room served as a living room, dining room and bedroom. He was named after his paternal grandfather. William Carnegie had a successful weaving business and owned multiple looms.

In 1836, the family moved to a larger house in Edgar Street (opposite Reid's Park), following the demand for more heavy damask, from which his father benefited. Carnegie was educated at the Free School in Dunfermline, a gift to the town from philanthropist Adam Rolland of Gask.

Carnegie's maternal uncle, Scottish political leader George Lauder Sr., deeply influenced him as a boy by introducing him to Robert Burns' writings and historical Scottish heroes such as Robert the Bruce, William Wallace, and Rob Roy. Lauder's son, also named George Lauder, grew up with Carnegie and later became his business partner in the United States.

When Carnegie was 12, his father had fallen on tough times as a handloom weaver. Making matters worse, the country was in starvation. His mother helped support the family by assisting her brother and by selling potted meats at her "sweetie shop", becoming the primary breadwinner. Struggling to make ends meet, the Carnegies borrowed money from George Lauder, Sr. and moved to the United States in 1848 for the prospect of a better life. They headed to Allegheny, Pennsylvania, where they heard there was a demand for workers. Carnegie's emigration to America was his second journey outside Dunfermline. The first was a family outing to Edinburgh to see Queen Victoria.

In September 1848, Carnegie and his family arrived in Allegheny. Carnegie's father struggled to sell his product on his own. Eventually, the father and son both received job offers at Anchor Cotton Mills, a Scottish-owned facility. Carnegie's first job in 1848 was as a bobbin boy, changing spools of thread in a cotton mill 12 hours a day, 6 days a week in a Pittsburgh cotton factory. His starting wage was $1.20 per week (equivalent to $45 in 2025).

His father soon quit his position at the cotton mill, returning to his loom, and was again removed as a substantial breadwinner. But Carnegie attracted the attention of John Hay, a Scottish manufacturer of bobbins, who offered him a job for $2.00 per week (equivalent to $74 in 2025).

In his autobiography, Carnegie writes about the hardships he had to endure with this new job:

Soon after this Mr. John Hay, a fellow Scotch manufacturer of bobbins in Allegheny City, needed a boy, and asked whether I would not go into his service. I went, and received two dollars per week; but at first the work was even more irksome than the factory. I had to run a small steam-engine and to fire the boiler in the cellar of the bobbin factory. It was too much for me. I found myself night after night, sitting up in bed trying the steam gauges, fearing at one time that the steam was too low and that the workers above would complain that they had not power enough, and at another time that the steam was too high and that the boiler might burst.

=== Telegraph ===
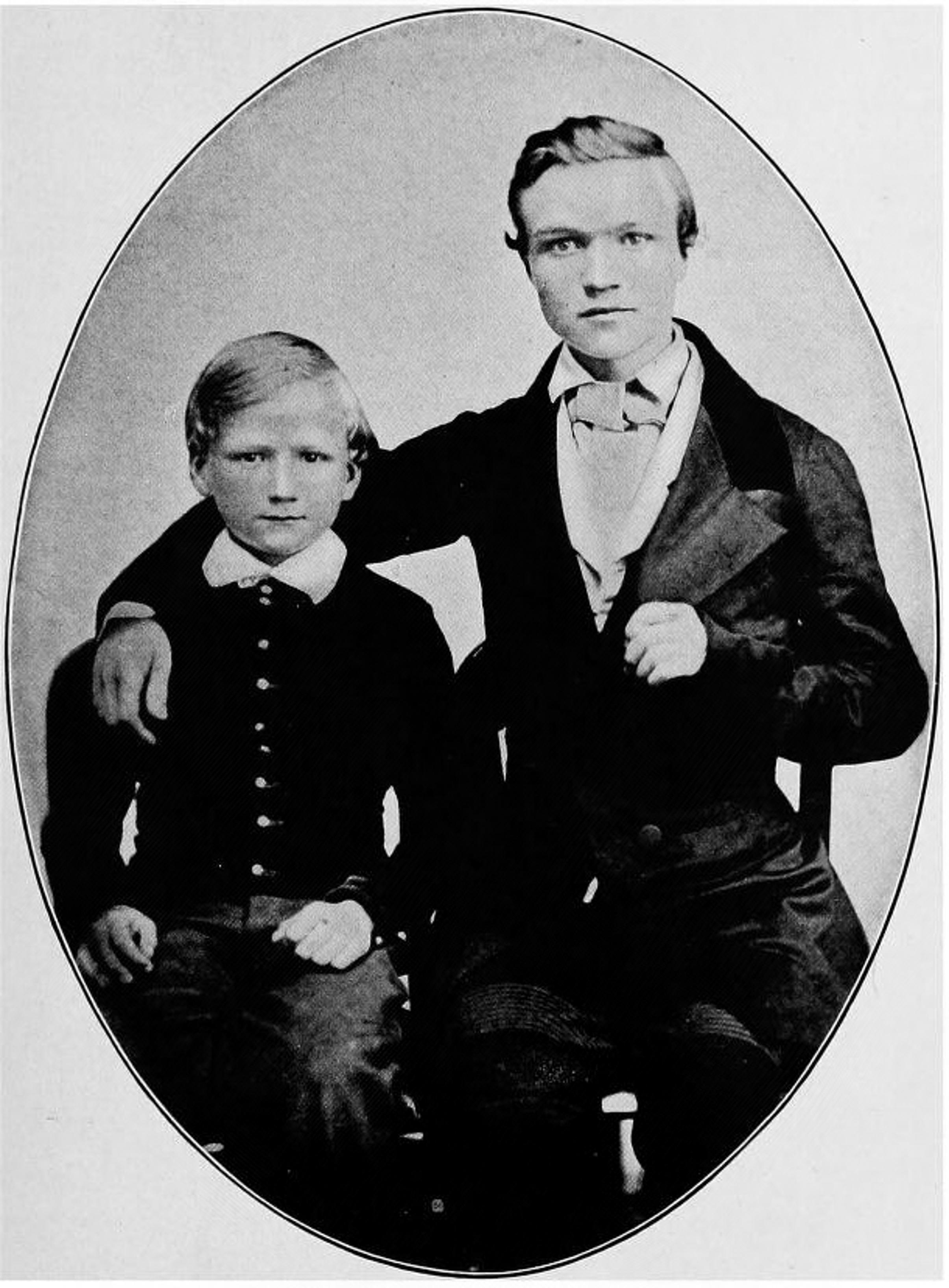
Carnegie, age 16, with younger brother Thomas, c. 1851

In 1849, Carnegie became a telegraph messenger boy in the Pittsburgh Office of the Ohio Telegraph Company, following the recommendation of his uncle. He was a hard worker and would memorize all of the locations of Pittsburgh's businesses and the faces of important men. He made many connections this way. He also paid close attention to his work and quickly learned to distinguish the different sounds the incoming telegraph signals produced. He developed the ability to translate signals by ear, without using the paper slip.

Within a year he was promoted to an operator. Carnegie's education and passion for reading were given a boost by Colonel James Anderson, who opened his personal library of 400 volumes to working boys each Saturday night. Carnegie was a consistent borrower and a "self-made man" in both his economic development and his intellectual and cultural development. He was so grateful to Colonel Anderson for the use of his library that he "resolved, if ever wealth came to me, [to see to it] that other poor boys might receive opportunities similar to those for which we were indebted to the nobleman".

=== Railroads ===
Starting in 1853, when Carnegie was around 18 years old, Thomas A. Scott of the Pennsylvania Railroad employed him as a secretary/telegraph operator at a salary of $4.00 per week ($155 by 2025). Carnegie accepted the job with the railroad as he saw more prospects for career growth and experience there than with the telegraph company. When Carnegie was 24 years old, Scott asked him if he could handle being superintendent of the Western Division of the Pennsylvania Railroad.

On December 1, 1859, Carnegie officially became superintendent of the Western Division. He hired his sixteen-year-old brother Tom to be his personal secretary and telegraph operator. Carnegie also hired his cousin, Maria Hogan, who became the first female telegraph operator in the country. As superintendent, Carnegie made a salary of $1500 a year ($54,000 by 2025 inflation). His employment by the Pennsylvania Railroad would be vital to his later success. The railroads were the first big businesses in America, and the Pennsylvania was one of the largest. Carnegie learned much about management and cost control during these years, and from Scott in particular.

Scott also helped him with his first investments. Many of these were part of the corruption indulged in by Scott and the president of the Pennsylvania Railroad, John Edgar Thomson, which consisted of inside trading in companies with which the railroad did business, or payoffs made by contracting parties "as part of a quid pro quo". In 1855, Scott made it possible for Carnegie to invest $500 in the Adams Express Company, which contracted with the Pennsylvania to carry its messengers. The money was secured by his mother's placing of a $600 mortgage on the family's $700 home, but the opportunity was available only because of Carnegie's close relationship with Scott. A few years later, he received a few shares in Theodore Tuttle Woodruff's sleeping car company as a reward for holding shares that Woodruff had given to Scott and Thomson, as a payoff. Reinvesting his returns in such inside investments in railroad-related industries (iron, bridges, and rails), Carnegie slowly accumulated capital, the basis for his later success. Throughout his later career, he made use of his close connections to Thomson and Scott, as he established businesses that supplied rails and bridges to the railroad, offering the two men stakes in his enterprises.

=== 1860–1865: American Civil War ===
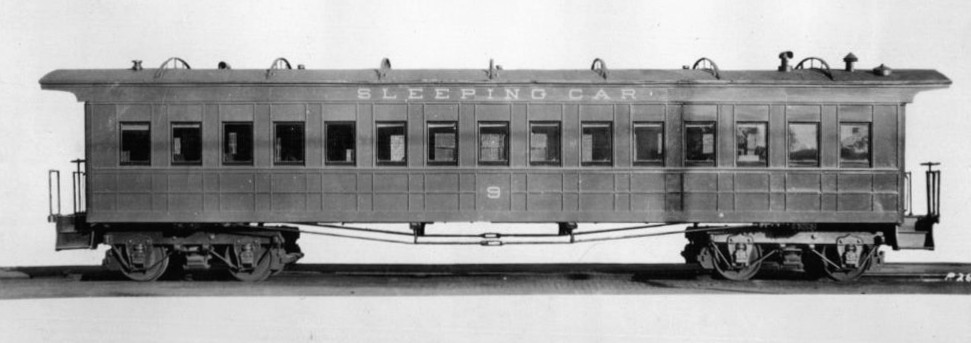
Pullman sleeping car, where Carnegie made one of his most successful investments

Before the American Civil War, Carnegie arranged a merger between Woodruff's company and that of George Pullman, the inventor of the sleeping car for first-class travel, which facilitated business travel at distances over 500 miles (800 km). The investment proved a success and a source of profit for Woodruff and Carnegie. The young Carnegie continued to work for Pennsylvania's Tom Scott and introduced several improvements in the service.

In the spring of 1861, Carnegie joined the U.S. Military Telegraph Corps and was appointed by Scott, who was now Assistant Secretary of War in charge of military transportation, as Superintendent of the Military Railways and the Union Government's telegraph lines in the East. Carnegie helped open the rail lines into Washington, D.C. that the rebels had cut; he rode the locomotive pulling the first brigade of Union troops to reach Washington, D.C. Following the defeat of Union forces at Bull Run, he personally supervised the transportation of the defeated forces. Under his organization, the telegraph service rendered efficient service to the Union cause and significantly assisted in the eventual victory. Carnegie later joked that he was "the first casualty of the war" when he gained a scar on his cheek from freeing a trapped telegraph wire.

The defeat of the Confederacy required vast supplies of munitions, with railroads and telegraph lines being required to deliver them efficiently. The war demonstrated how integral the industries were to Union success.

=== Keystone Bridge Company ===
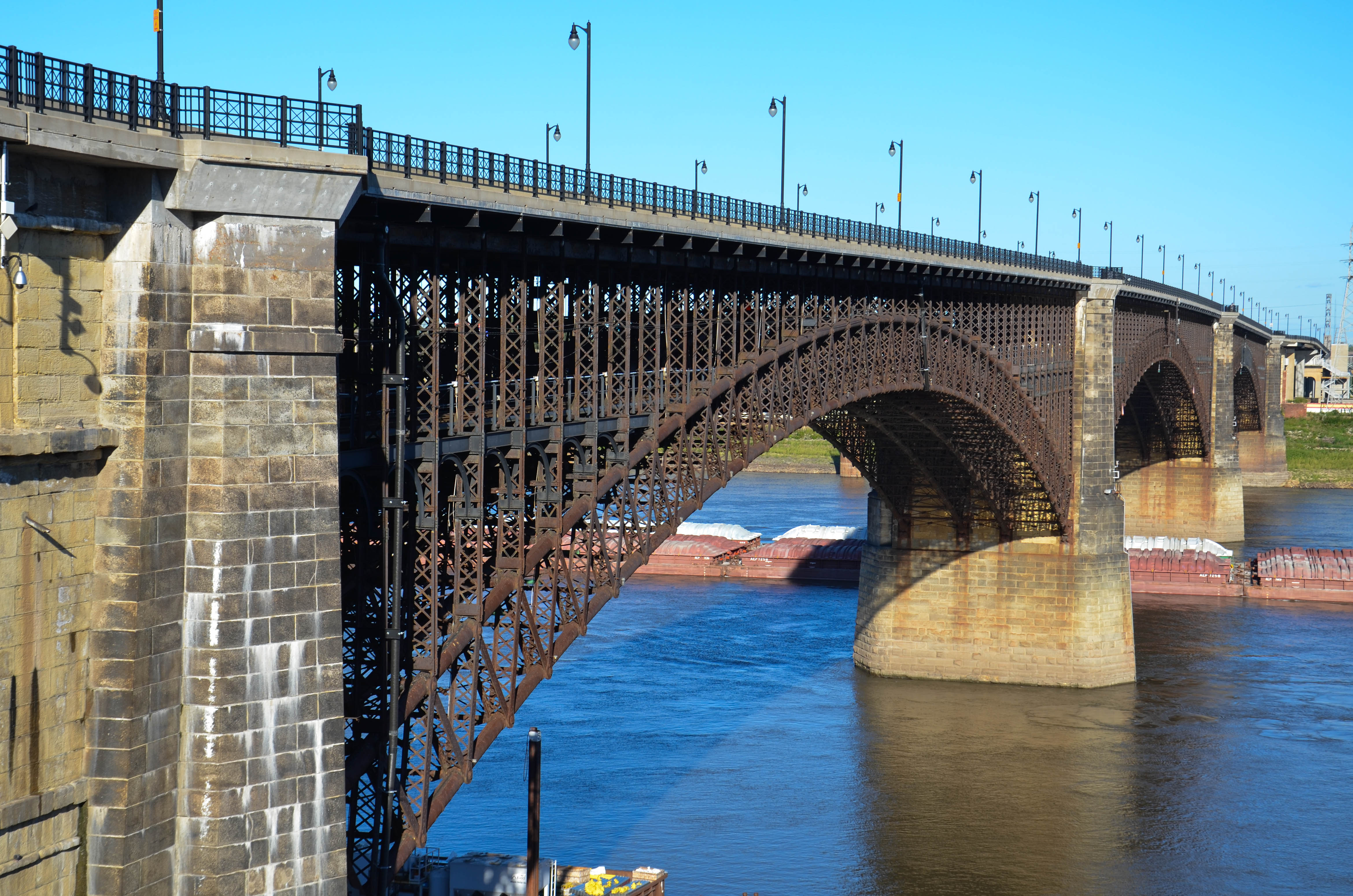
Eads Bridge across the Mississippi River, opened in 1874 using Carnegie steel

In 1864, Carnegie was one of the early investors in the Columbia Oil Company in Venango County, Pennsylvania. In one year, the firm yielded over $1 million in cash dividends, and petroleum from oil wells on the property sold profitably. The demand for iron products, such as armor for gunboats, cannons, and shells, as well as a hundred other industrial products, made Pittsburgh a center of wartime production. Carnegie worked with others in establishing a steel rolling mill, and steel production and control of industry became the source of his fortune. Carnegie had some investments in the iron industry before the war.

After the war, Carnegie left the railroads to devote his energies to the ironworks trade. Carnegie worked to develop several ironworks, eventually forming the Keystone Bridge Works and the Union Ironworks, in Pittsburgh. Although he had left the Pennsylvania Railroad Company, he remained connected to its management, namely Thomas A. Scott and J. Edgar Thomson. He used his connection to the two men to acquire contracts for his Keystone Bridge Company and the rails produced by his ironworks. He also gave stock in his businesses to Scott and Thomson, and the Pennsylvania was his best customer. When he built his first steel plant, he made a point of naming it after Thomson. As well as having good business sense, Carnegie possessed charm and literary knowledge. He was invited to many important social functions, which Carnegie exploited to his advantage.

Carnegie, through Keystone, supplied the steel for and owned shares in the landmark Eads Bridge project across the Mississippi River at St. Louis, Missouri (completed 1874). This project was an important proof-of-concept for steel technology, which marked the opening of a new steel market.

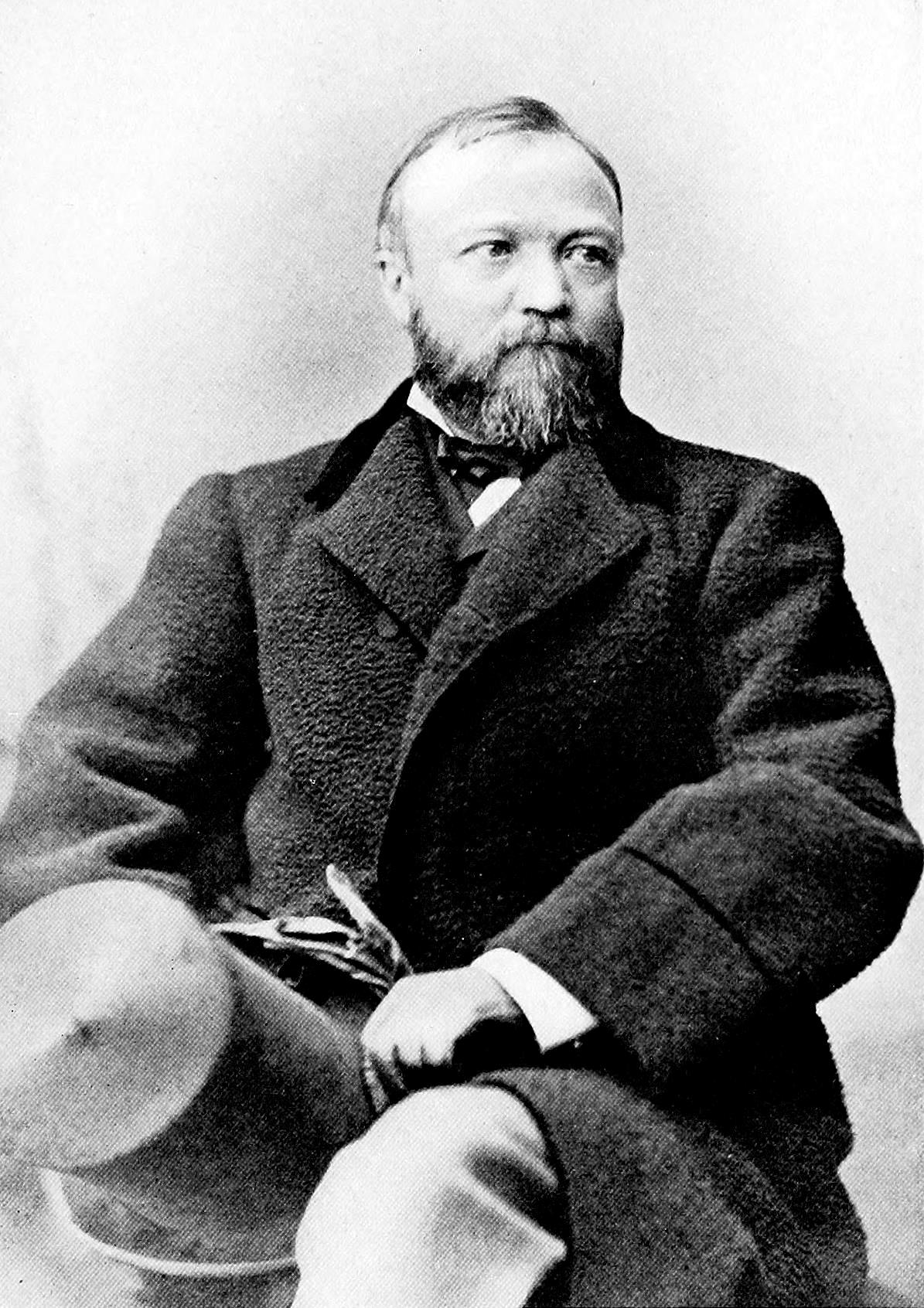
Carnegie, c. 1878

Carnegie believed in using his fortune for others and doing more than making money. In 1868, at age 33, he wrote:

I propose to take an income no greater than $50,000 per annum! Beyond this I need ever earn, make no effort to increase my fortune, but spend the surplus each year for benevolent purposes! Let us cast aside business forever, except for others. Let us settle in Oxford and I shall get a thorough education, making the acquaintance of literary men. I figure that this will take three years' active work. I shall pay especial attention to speaking in public. We can settle in London and I can purchase a controlling interest in some newspaper or live review and give the general management of it attention, taking part in public matters, especially those connected with education and improvement of the poorer classes. Man must have no idol and the amassing of wealth is one of the worst species of idolatry! No idol is more debasing than the worship of money! Whatever I engage in I must push inordinately; therefore should I be careful to choose that life which will be the most elevating in its character. To continue much longer overwhelmed by business cares and with most of my thoughts wholly upon the way to make more money in the shortest time, must degrade me beyond hope of permanent recovery. I will resign business at thirty-five, but during these ensuing two years I wish to spend the afternoons in receiving instruction and in reading systematically!

=== Industrialist ===
==== 1875–1900: Steel empire ====
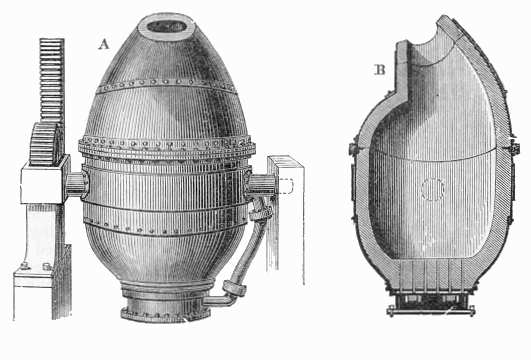
Bessemer converter

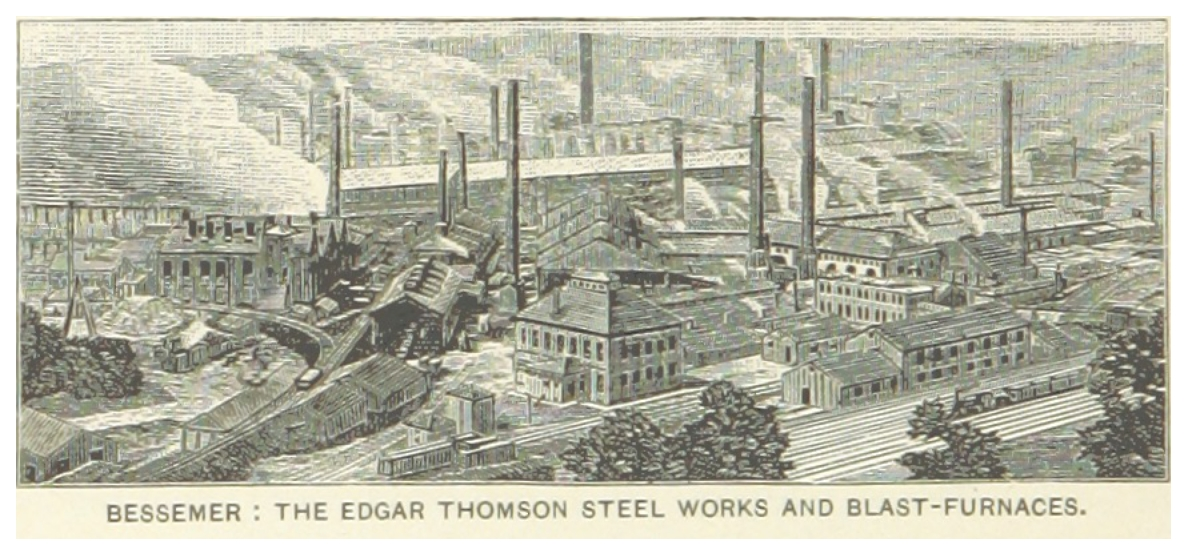
The Edgar Thomson Steel Works and Blast-Furnaces in Braddock, Pennsylvania (1891)

Carnegie made his fortune in the steel industry, controlling the most extensive integrated iron and steel operations ever owned by an individual in the United States. One of his two great innovations was in the cheap and efficient mass production of steel by adopting and adapting the Bessemer process, which allowed the high carbon content of pig iron to be burnt away in a controlled and rapid way during steel production. Steel prices dropped as a result, and Bessemer steel was rapidly adopted for rails; however, it was not suitable for buildings and bridges.

The second was in his vertical integration of all suppliers of raw materials. In 1883, Carnegie bought the rival Homestead Steel Works, which included an extensive plant served by tributary coal and iron fields, a 425-mile-long (684 km) railway, and a line of lake steamships. In the late 1880s, Carnegie Steel was the largest manufacturer of pig iron, steel rails, and coke in the world, with a capacity to produce approximately 2,000 tons of pig iron per day.

By 1889, the U.S. output of steel exceeded that of the UK, and Carnegie owned a large part of it. Carnegie's empire grew to include the J. Edgar Thomson Steel Works in Braddock, Pennsylvania (named for John Edgar Thomson, Carnegie's former boss and president of the Pennsylvania Railroad), the Pittsburgh Bessemer Steel Works, the Lucy Furnaces, the Union Iron Mills, the Union Mill (Wilson, Walker & County), the Keystone Bridge Works, the Hartman Steel Works, the Frick Coke Company, and the Scotia, Pennsylvania ore mines. Carnegie combined his assets and those of his associates in 1892 with the launching of the Carnegie Steel Company.

Carnegie's success was also due to his relationship with the railroad industries, which not only relied on steel for track, but were also making money from steel transport. The steel and railroad barons worked closely to negotiate prices instead of allowing free-market competition.

Besides Carnegie's market manipulation, United States trade tariffs were also working in favor of the steel industry. Carnegie spent energy and resources lobbying Congress for a continuation of favorable tariffs from which he earned millions of dollars a year. Carnegie tried to keep this information concealed, but legal documents released in 1900, during proceedings with the ex-chairman of Carnegie Steel, Henry Clay Frick, revealed how favorable the tariffs had been.

While owning steel works, Carnegie had purchased at low cost the most valuable of the iron ore fields around Lake Superior.

==== 1901: U.S. Steel ====
In 1901, Carnegie was 65 years of age and considering retirement. He reformed his enterprises into conventional joint stock corporations as preparation for this. John Pierpont Morgan was a banker and America's most important financial deal maker. He had observed how efficiently Carnegie produced profits. He envisioned an integrated steel industry that would cut costs, lower prices to consumers, produce in greater quantities and raise wages to workers. To this end, he needed to buy out Carnegie and several other major producers and integrate them into one company, thereby eliminating duplication and waste. He concluded negotiations on March 2, 1901, and formed the United States Steel Corporation. It was the first corporation in the world with a market capitalization of over $1 billion.

The buyout, secretly negotiated by Charles M. Schwab (no relation to Charles R. Schwab), was the largest such industrial takeover in United States history to date. The holdings were incorporated in the United States Steel Corporation, a trust organized by Morgan, and Carnegie retired from business. His steel enterprises were bought out for $303,450,000.

Carnegie's share of this amounted to $225.64 million (in 2025, $8.73 billion), which was paid to him in the form of 5%, 50-year gold bonds. The letter agreeing to sell his share was signed on February 26, 1901. On March 2, the circular formally filed the organization and capitalization (at $1.4 billion—4% of the U.S. gross domestic product at the time) of the United States Steel Corporation actually completed the contract. The bonds were to be delivered within two weeks to the Hudson Trust Company of Hoboken, New Jersey, in trust to Robert A. Franks, Carnegie's business secretary. There, a special vault was built to house the physical bulk of nearly $230 million worth of bonds.

=== Scholar and activist ===
==== 1880–1900 ====
Carnegie continued his business career; some of his literary intentions were fulfilled. He befriended the English poet Matthew Arnold, the English philosopher Herbert Spencer, and the American humorist Mark Twain, as well as being in correspondence and acquaintance with most of the U.S. Presidents, statesmen, and notable writers.

Carnegie constructed commodious swimming-baths for the people of his hometown in Dunfermline in 1879. In the following year, Carnegie gave £8,000 for the establishment of a Dunfermline Carnegie Library in Scotland. In 1884, he gave $50,000 to Bellevue Hospital Medical College (now part of New York University Medical Center) to create a histological laboratory, now called the Carnegie Laboratory.

In 1881, Carnegie took his family, including his 70-year-old mother, on a trip to the United Kingdom. They toured Scotland by coach and enjoyed several receptions en route. The highlight was a return to Dunfermline, where Carnegie's mother laid the foundation stone of a Carnegie Library which he funded. Carnegie's criticism of British society did not mean dislike; on the contrary, one of Carnegie's ambitions was to act as a catalyst for a close association between English-speaking peoples. To this end, in the early 1880s in partnership with Samuel Storey, he purchased numerous newspapers in Britain, all of which were to advocate the abolition of the monarchy and the establishment of "the British Republic". Carnegie's charm, aided by his wealth, afforded him many British friends, including Prime Minister William Ewart Gladstone.

In 1886, Carnegie's younger brother Thomas died at age 43.

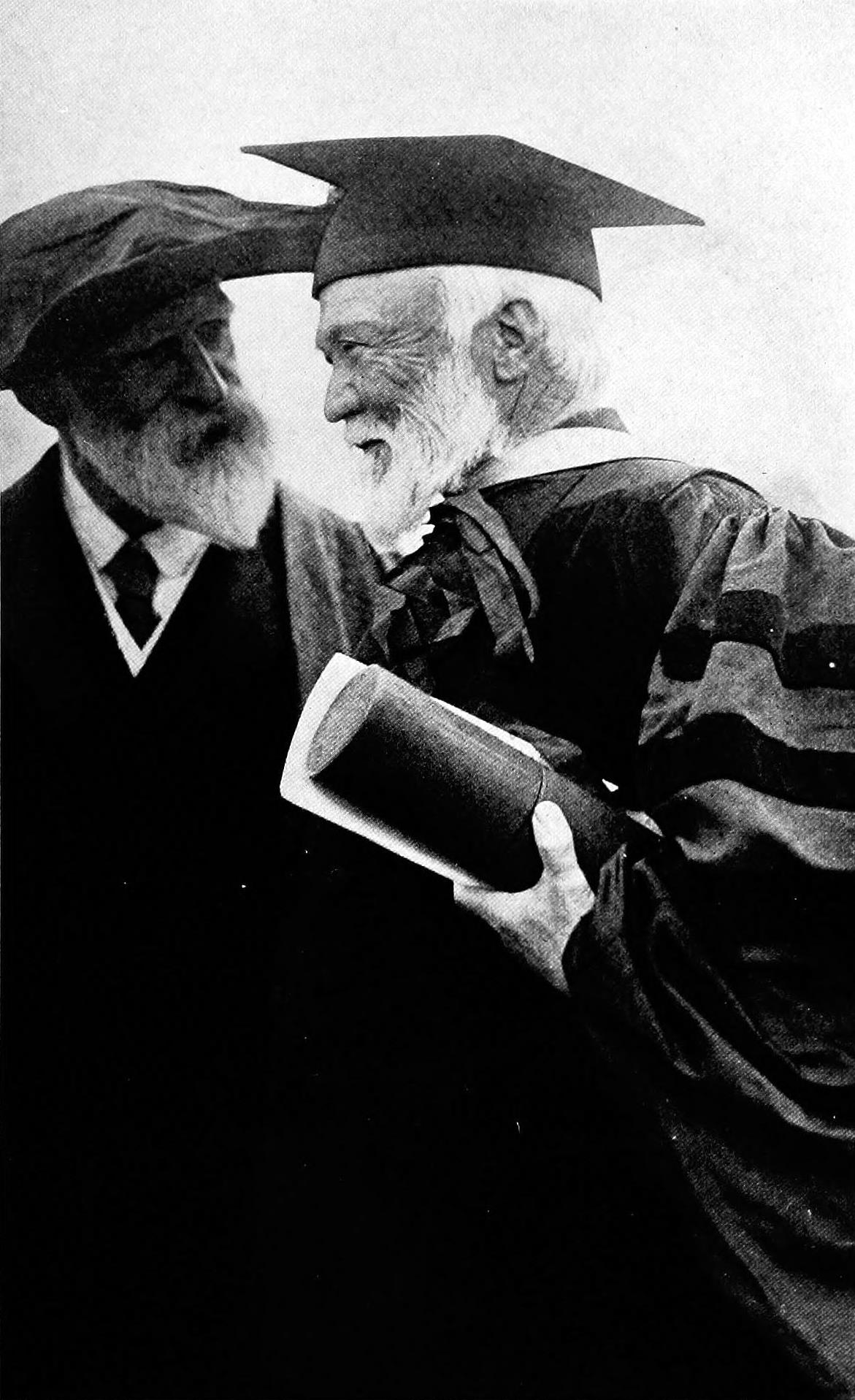
Carnegie, right, with James Bryce, 1st Viscount Bryce

Following his tour of the UK, he wrote about his experiences in a book entitled An American Four-in-hand in Britain. In 1886, Carnegie wrote his most radical work to date, entitled Triumphant Democracy. Liberal in its use of statistics to make its arguments, the book argued his view that the American republican system of government was superior to the British monarchical system. It gave a highly favorable and idealized view of American progress and criticized the British royal family. The cover depicted an upended royal crown and a broken scepter. The book created considerable controversy in the UK. The book made many Americans appreciate their country's economic progress and sold over 40,000 copies, mostly in the U.S.

Although actively involved in running his many businesses, Carnegie had become a regular contributor to numerous magazines, most notably The Nineteenth Century, under the editorship of James Knowles, and the influential North American Review, led by the editor Lloyd Bryce. In 1889, Carnegie published "Wealth" in the June issue of the North American Review. After reading it, Gladstone requested its publication in Britain, where it appeared as "The Gospel of Wealth" in The Pall Mall Gazette. Carnegie argued that the life of a wealthy industrialist should comprise two parts. The first part was the gathering and the accumulation of wealth. The second part was for the subsequent distribution of this wealth to benevolent causes. Philanthropy was key to making life worthwhile.

Carnegie was a well-regarded writer. He published three books on travel.

=== Anti-imperialism ===
In the aftermath of the Spanish–American War, the United States seemed poised to annex Cuba, Guam, Puerto Rico and the Philippines. Carnegie strongly opposed the idea of American colonies. He opposed the annexation of the Philippines almost to the point of supporting William Jennings Bryan against McKinley in 1900. In 1898, Carnegie tried to arrange independence for the Philippines. As the conclusion of the Spanish–American War neared, the United States purchased the Philippines from Spain for $20 million. To counter what he perceived as American imperialism, Carnegie personally offered $20 million to the Philippines so that the Filipino people could purchase their independence from the United States. However, nothing came of the offer. In 1898 Carnegie joined the American Anti-Imperialist League, in opposition to the U.S. annexation of the Philippines. Its membership included former presidents of the United States Grover Cleveland and Benjamin Harrison and literary figures such as Mark Twain.

=== 1901–1919: Philanthropist ===
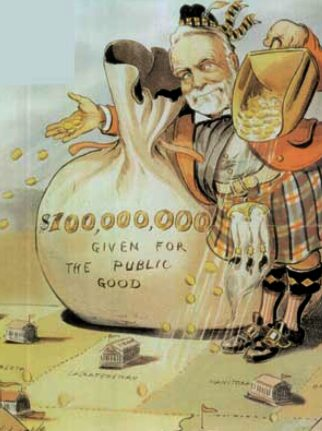
Andrew Carnegie's philanthropy. Puck magazine cartoon by Louis Dalrymple, 1903

Carnegie spent his last years as a philanthropist. From 1901 forward, public attention was turned from the shrewd business acumen which had enabled Carnegie to accumulate such a fortune, to the public-spirited way in which he devoted himself to using it on philanthropic projects. He had written about his views on social subjects and the responsibilities of great wealth in Triumphant Democracy (1886) and Gospel of Wealth (1889). Carnegie devoted the rest of his life to providing capital for purposes of public interest and social and educational advancement. He saved letters of appreciation from those he helped in a desk drawer labeled "Gratitude and Sweet Words."

He provided $25,000 a year to the movement for spelling reform. His organization, the Simplified Spelling Board, created the Handbook of Simplified Spelling, which was written wholly in reformed spelling.

==== 3,000 public libraries ====
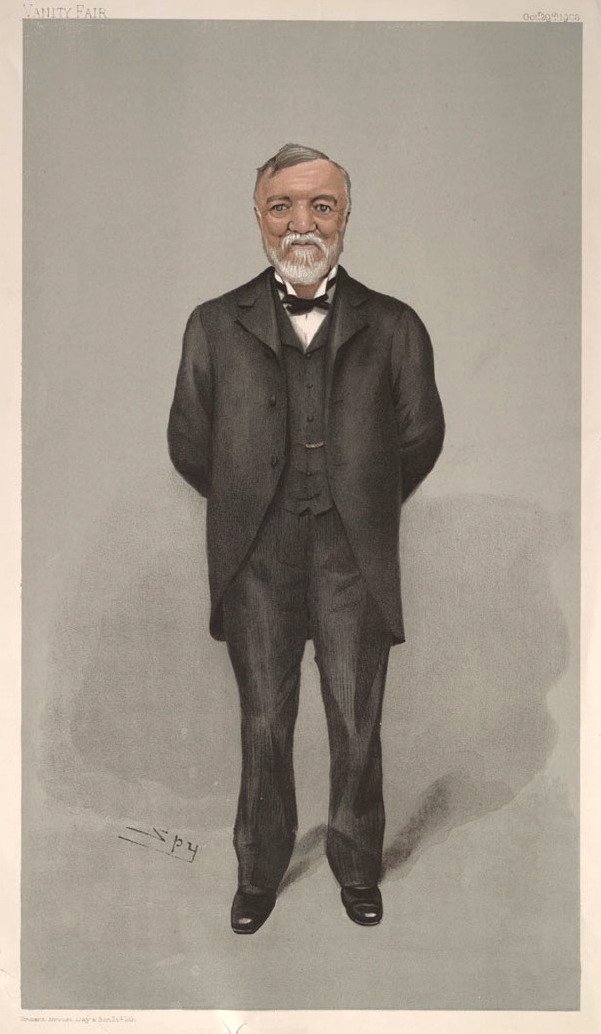
Captioned "Free Libraries", Carnegie caricatured by "Spy" for the London magazine Vanity Fair, 1903

Among his many philanthropic efforts, the establishment of public libraries throughout the United States, Britain, Canada, New Zealand, and mostly other English-speaking countries was especially prominent. In this special driving interest of his, Carnegie was inspired by meetings with philanthropist Enoch Pratt (1808–1896). The Enoch Pratt Free Library (1886) of Baltimore, Maryland, impressed Carnegie deeply; he said, "Pratt was my guide and inspiration."

Carnegie turned over management of the library project by 1908 to his staff, led by James Bertram (1874–1934). The first Carnegie Library opened in 1883 in Dunfermline. His method was to provide funds to build and equip the library, but only on the condition that the local authority matched that by providing the land and a budget for operation and maintenance.

To secure local interest, in 1885, he gave $500,000 to Pittsburgh, Pennsylvania, for a public library; in 1886, he gave $250,000 to Allegheny City, Pennsylvania, for a music hall and library; and he gave $250,000 to Edinburgh, Scotland, for a free library. In total, Carnegie funded some 3,000 libraries, located in 47 U.S. states, and also in Canada, Britain, Ireland, Belgium, Serbia, France, Australia, New Zealand, South Africa, the West Indies, and Fiji. He also donated £50,000 to help set up the University of Birmingham in 1899.

As Van Slyck (1991) showed, during the last years of the 19th century, there was the increasing adoption of the idea that free libraries should be available to the American public. But the design of such libraries was the subject of prolonged and heated debate. On one hand, the library profession called for designs that supported efficiency in administration and operation; on the other, wealthy philanthropists favored buildings that reinforced the paternalistic metaphor and enhanced civic pride. Between 1886 and 1917, Carnegie reformed both library philanthropy and library design, encouraging a closer correspondence between the two.

Carnegie's libraries also served as institutions of control. According to the historian Richard White, many steelworkers employed by Carnegie "despised" his library in Homestead, Pennsylvania.

Carnegie imposed work rules that deprived his employees of virtually all their leisure; then he built a library and lectured them on how to spend time they did not have. He owned their days, but declared the meager time they had left between work and sleep or their bursts of unemployment to be 'the key to... progress in all virtues." Mill officers dominated the library board, and the professional staff agreed that 'the library has the right to control the character of the reading, it has a right to direct the reader to the desired information."

— Richard White, The Republic for Which it Stands: The United States During Reconstruction and the Gilded Age

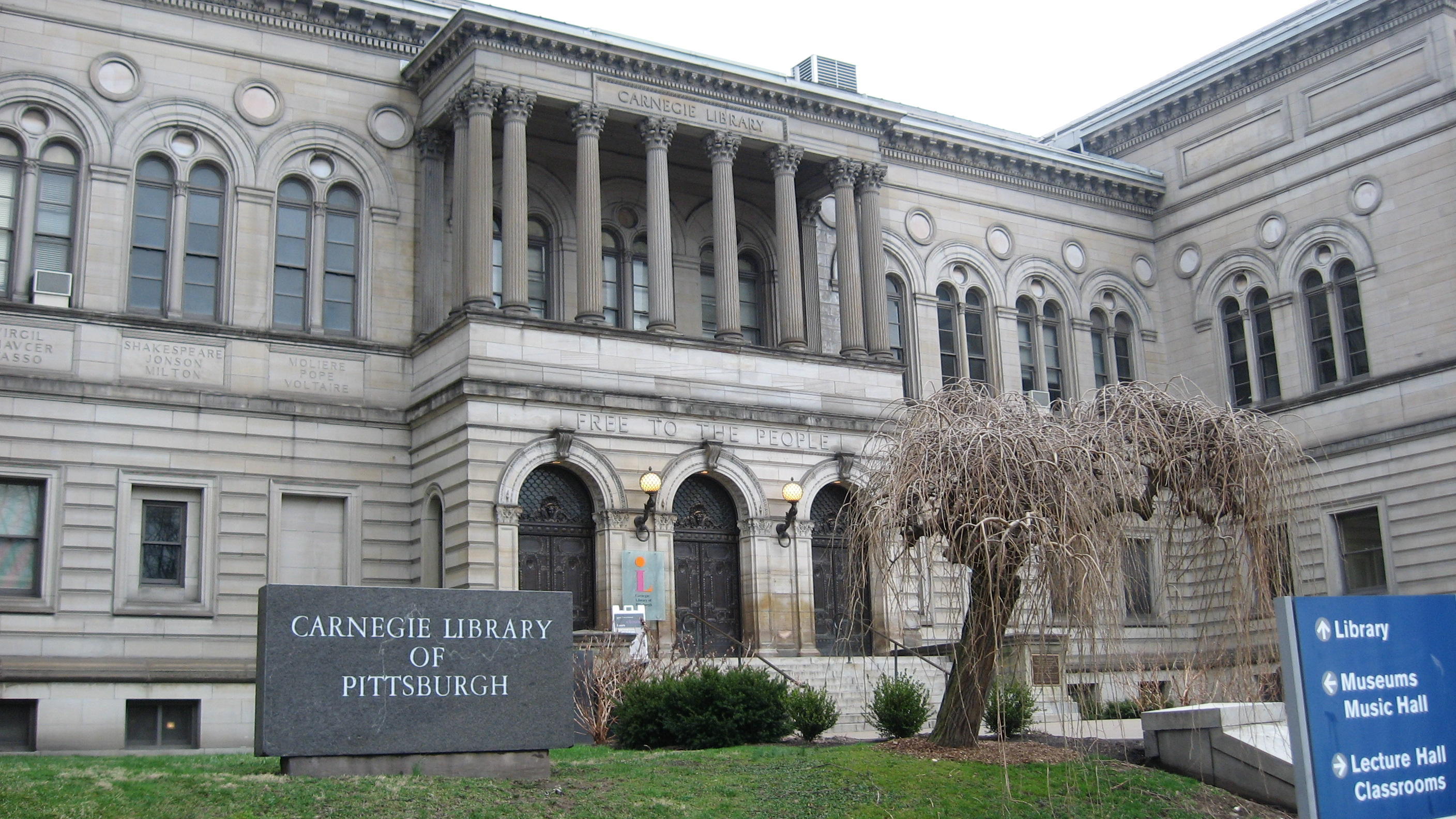
Carnegie Library of Pittsburgh, Pittsburgh, Pennsylvania

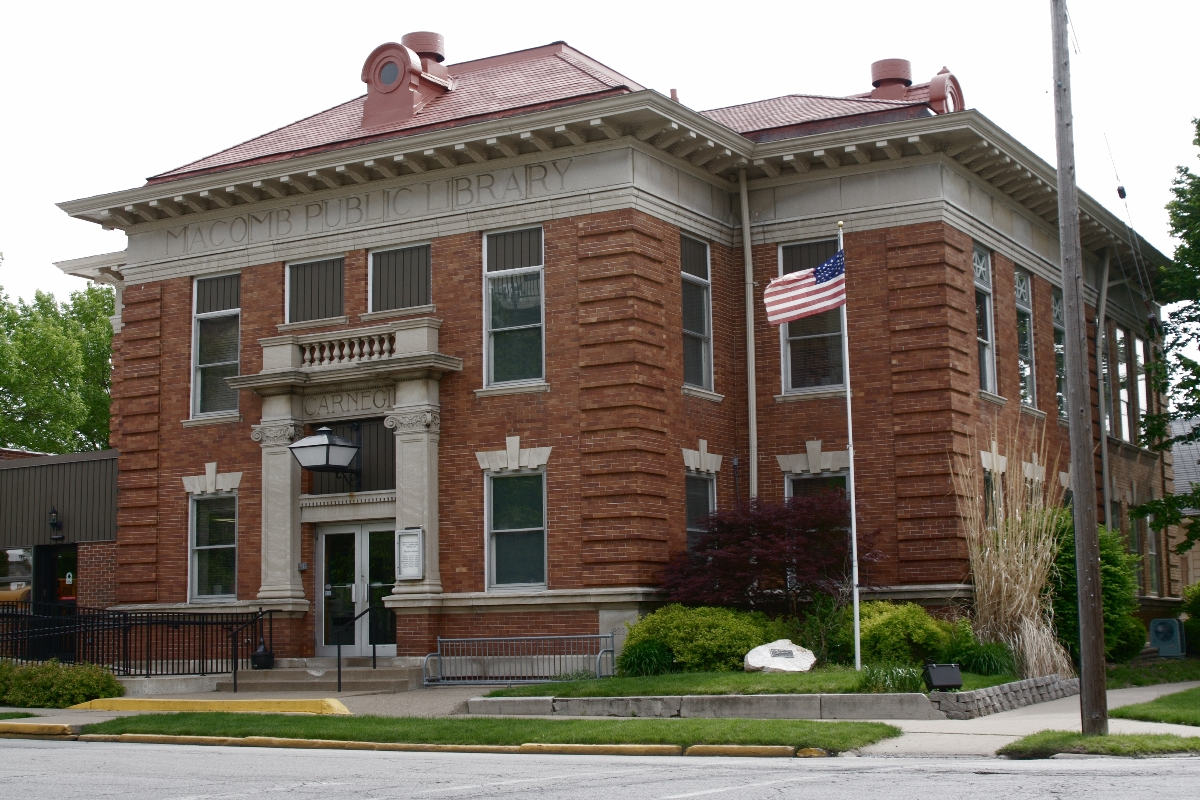
Carnegie library, Macomb, Illinois

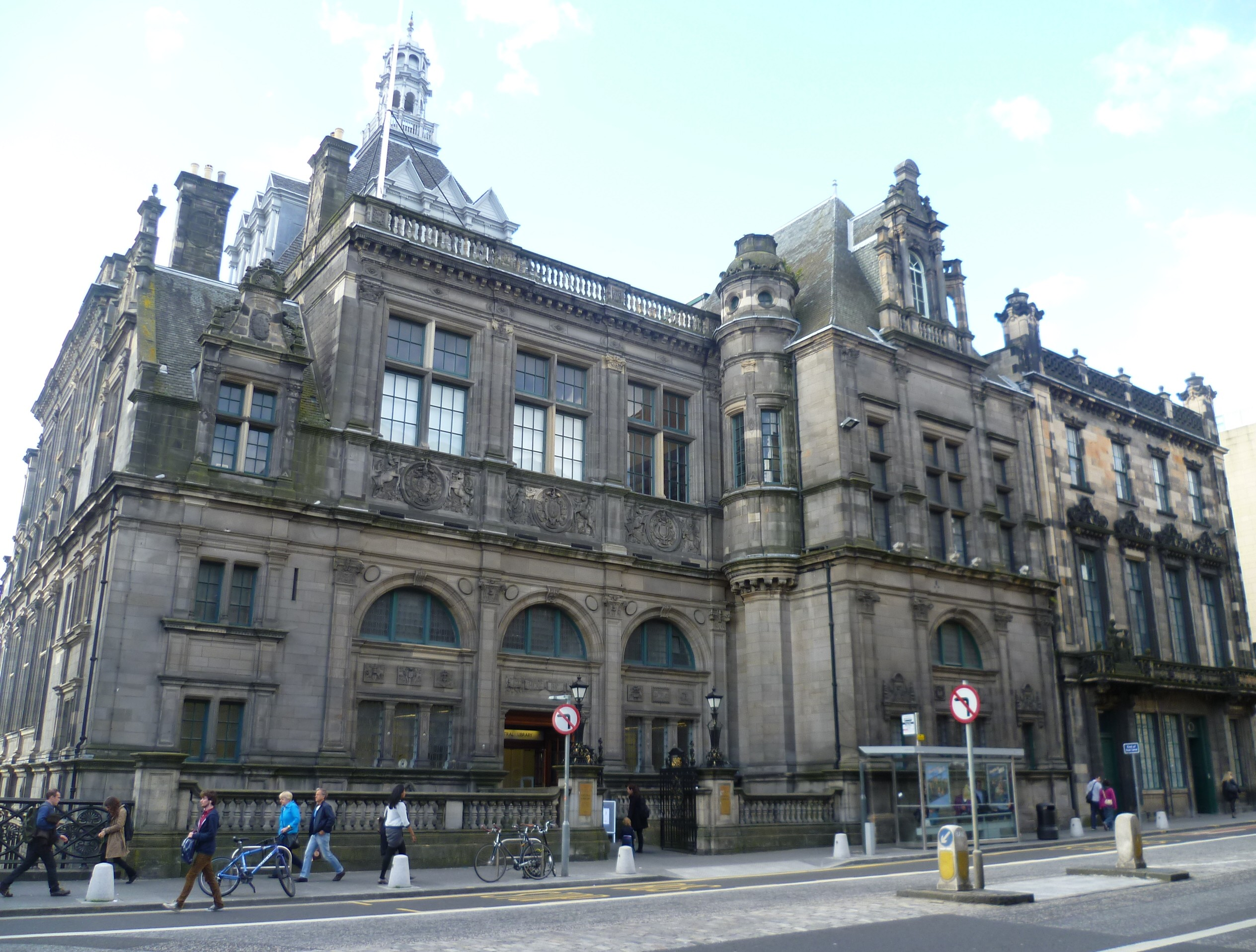
Edinburgh Central Library

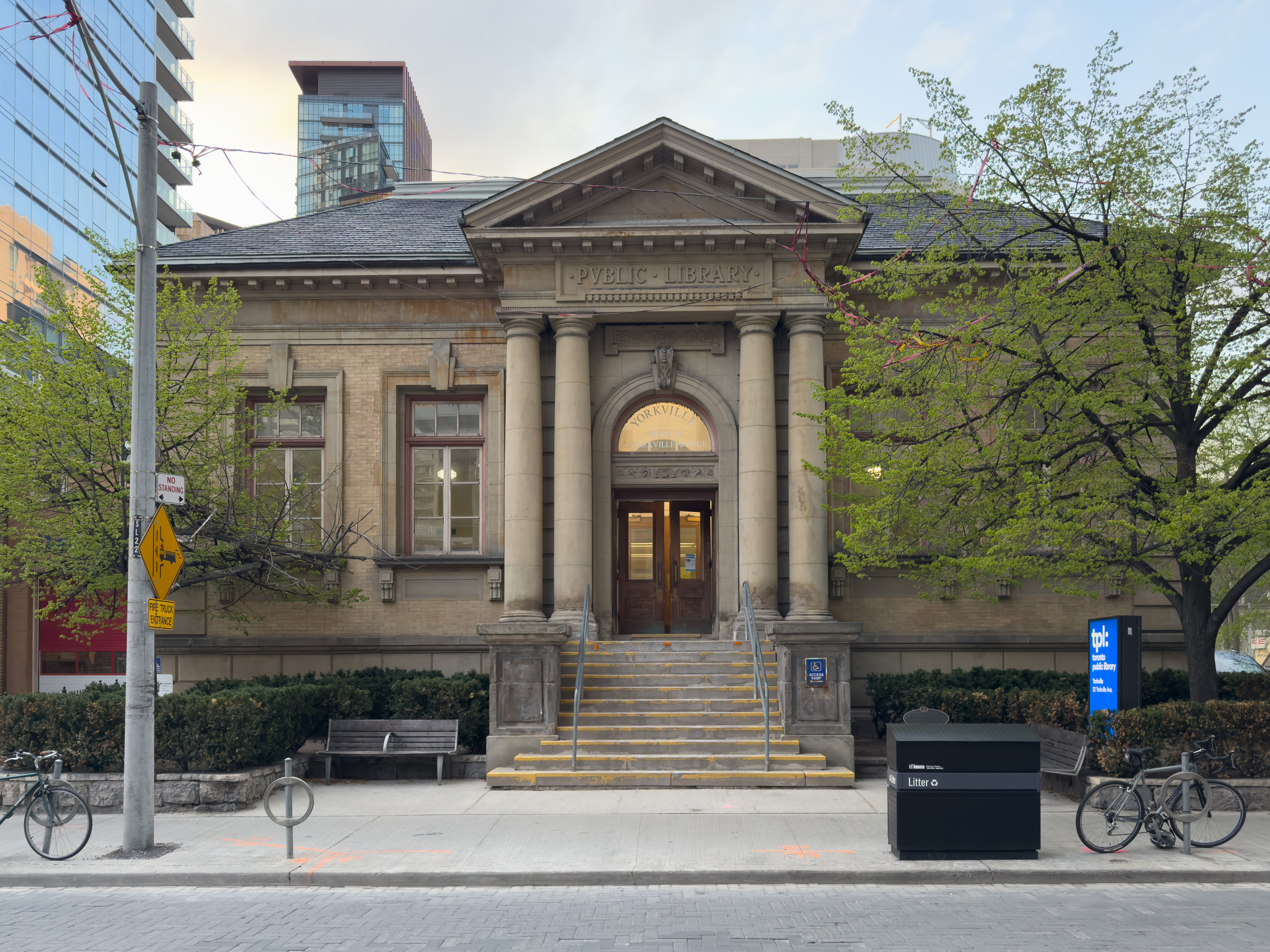
Yorkville Library, Ontario.

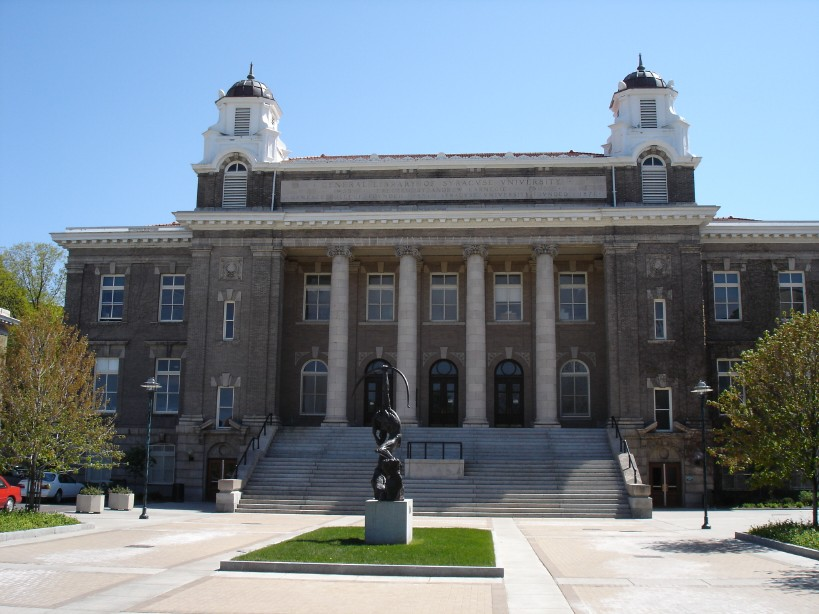
Carnegie Library at Syracuse University, New York

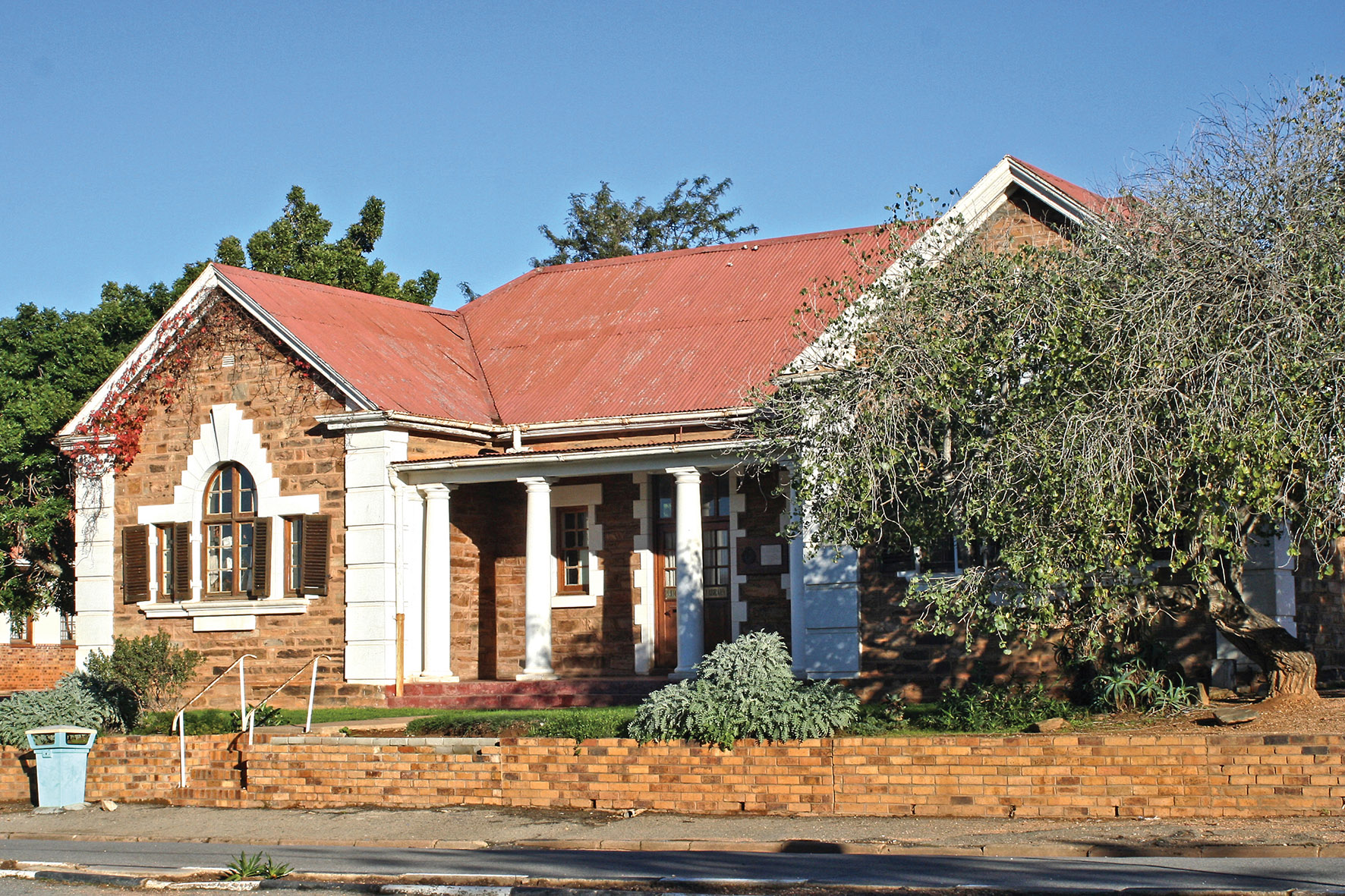
Carnegie Library, Moorreesburg, South Africa

==== Investing in education, science, pensions, civil heroism, music, and world peace ====
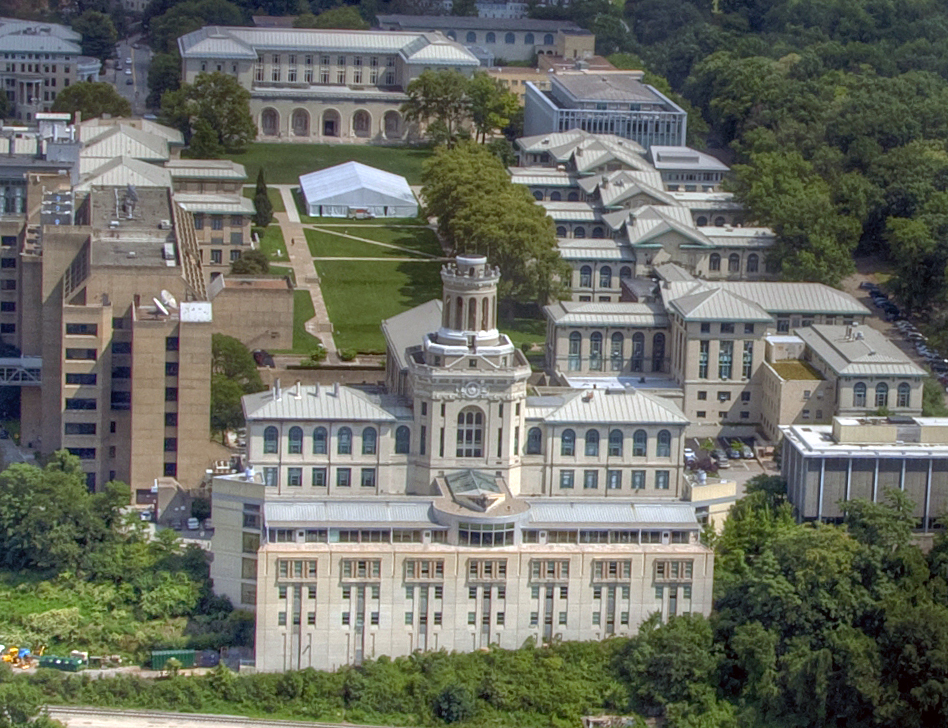
Carnegie Mellon University

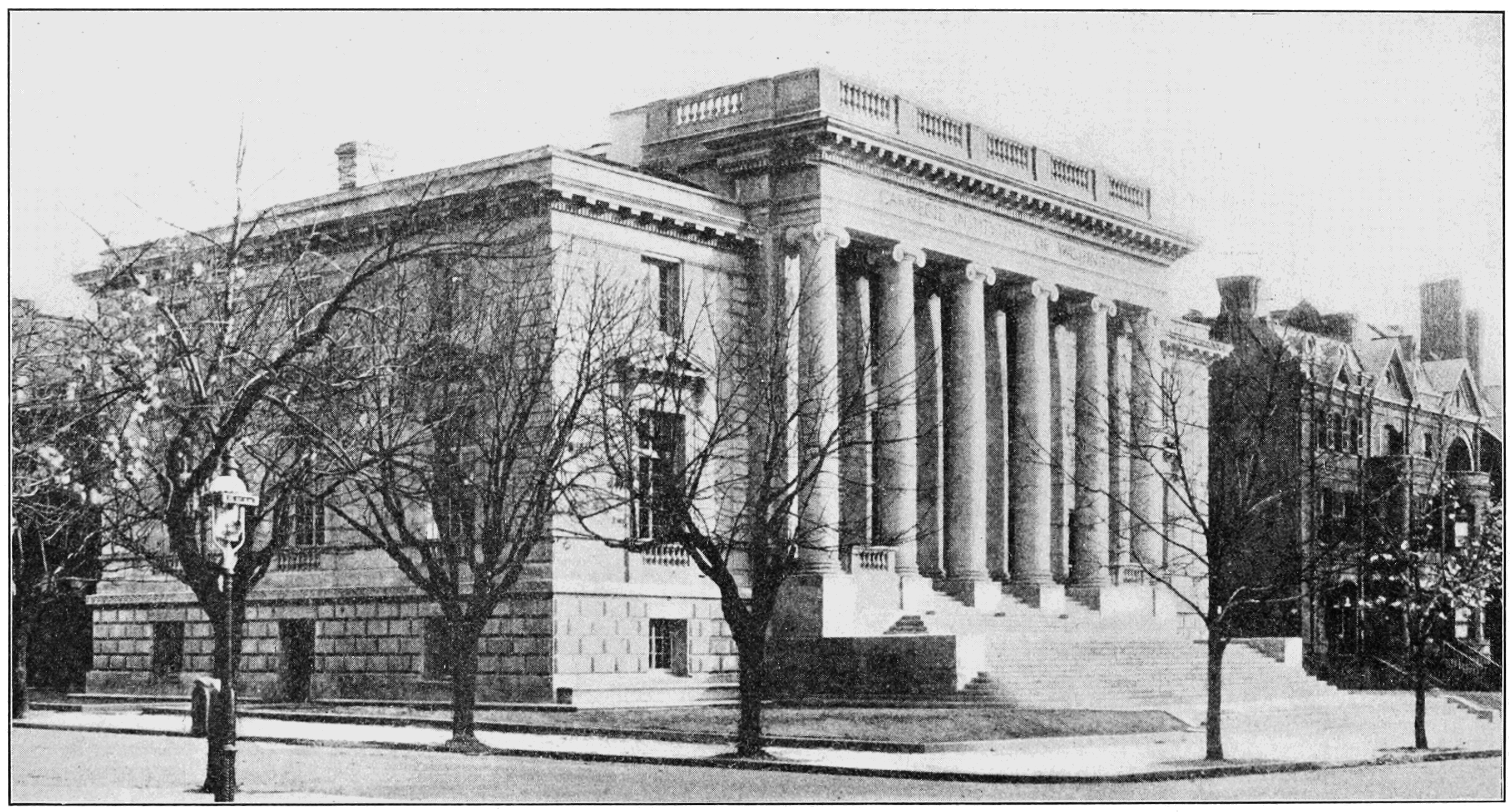
Carnegie Institution administration building in Washington, D.C.

In 1900, Carnegie gave $2 million to start the Carnegie Institute of Technology (CIT) at Pittsburgh and the same amount in 1902 to create the Carnegie Institution at Washington, D.C., to encourage research and discovery. He later contributed more to these and other schools. CIT is now known as Carnegie Mellon University after it merged with the Mellon Institute of Industrial Research. Carnegie also served on the Boards of Cornell University and Stevens Institute of Technology.

In 1911, Carnegie became a sympathetic benefactor to George Ellery Hale, who was trying to build the 100-inch (2.5 m) Hooker Telescope at Mount Wilson in California, and donated an additional ten million dollars to the Carnegie Institution with the following suggestion to expedite the construction of the telescope: "I hope the work at Mount Wilson will be vigorously pushed, because I am so anxious to hear the expected results from it. I should like to be satisfied before I depart, that we are going to repay to the old land some part of the debt we owe them by revealing more clearly than ever to them the new heavens." The telescope saw first light on November 2, 1917, with Carnegie still alive.

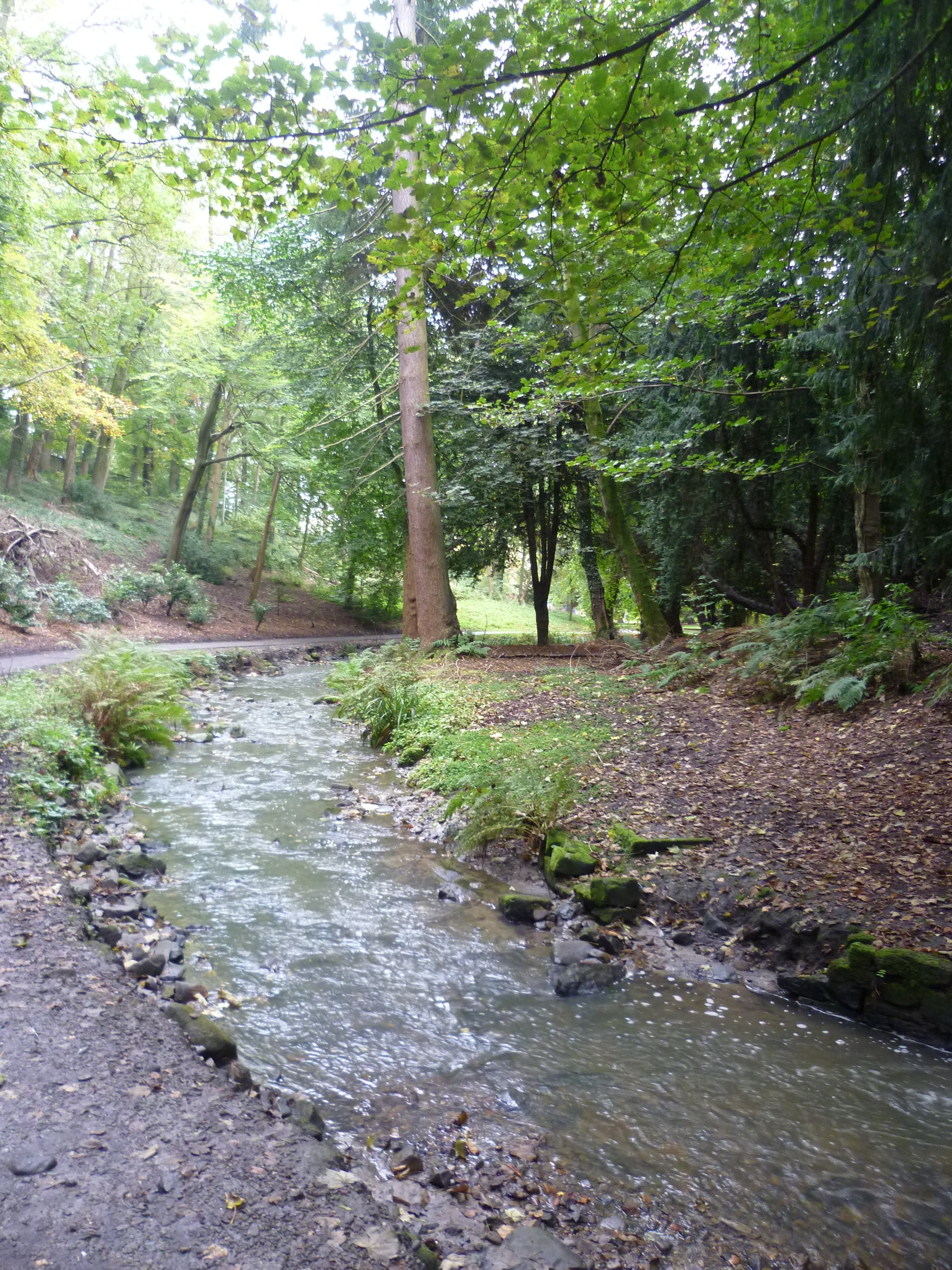
Pittencrieff Park, Dunfermline, Scotland

In 1901, in Scotland, he gave $10 million to establish the Carnegie Trust for the Universities of Scotland. It was created by a deed that he signed on June 7, 1901, and it was incorporated by royal charter on August 21, 1902. The establishing gift of $10 million was then an unprecedented sum: at the time, total government assistance to all four Scottish universities was about £50,000 a year. The aim of the Trust was to improve and extend the opportunities for scientific research in the Scottish universities and to enable the deserving and qualified youth of Scotland to attend a university. He was subsequently elected Lord Rector of University of St. Andrews in December 1901, and formally installed as such in October 1902, serving until 1907. He also donated large sums of money to Dunfermline, the place of his birth. In addition to a library, Carnegie also bought the private estate which became Pittencrieff Park and opened it to all members of the public, establishing the Carnegie Dunfermline Trust to benefit the people of Dunfermline. A statue of Carnegie was later built between 1913 and 1914 in the park as a commemoration for his creation of the park.

Carnegie was a major patron of music. He was a founding financial backer of Jeannette Thurber's National Conservatory of Music of America in 1885. He built the music performing venue Carnegie Hall in New York City; it opened in 1891 and remained in his family until 1925. His interest in music led him to fund the construction of 7,000 pipe organs in churches and temples, with no apparent preference for any religious denomination or sect.

He gave a further $10 million in 1913 to endow the Carnegie United Kingdom Trust, a grant-making foundation. He transferred to the trust the charge of all his existing and future benefactions, other than university benefactions in the United Kingdom. He gave the trustees a wide discretion, and they inaugurated a policy of financing rural library schemes rather than erecting library buildings, and of assisting the musical education of the people rather than granting organs to churches.

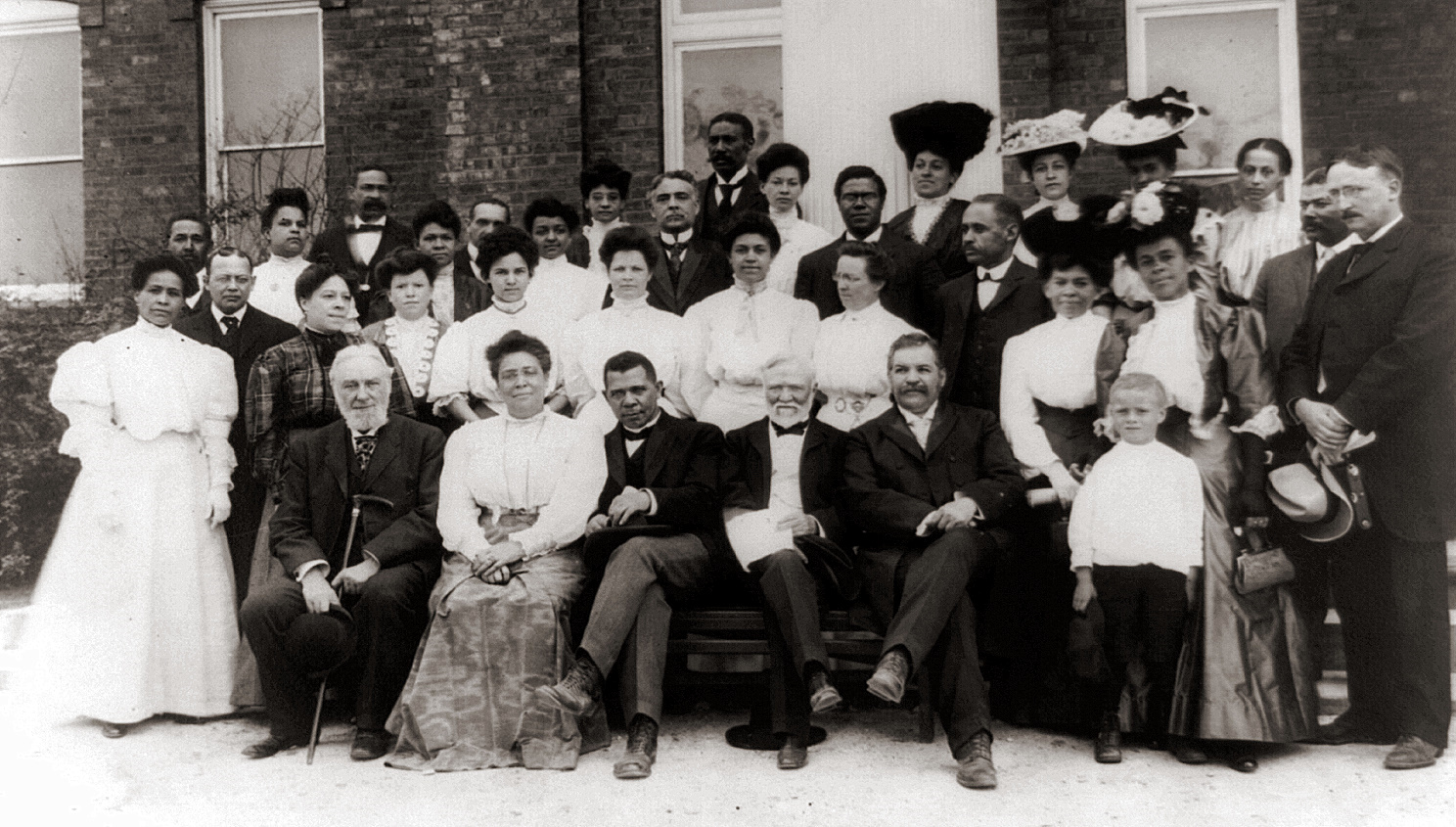
Carnegie with Black American leader Booker T. Washington (front row, center) in 1906 while visiting Tuskegee Institute

In 1901, Carnegie also established large pension funds for his former employees at Homestead and, in 1905, for American college professors. The latter fund evolved into TIAA-CREF. One critical requirement was that church-related schools had to sever their religious connections to get his money.

The Peace Palace in the Hague, opened in 1913

Carnegie was a large benefactor of the Tuskegee Institute for Black American education under Booker T. Washington. He helped Washington create the National Negro Business League.

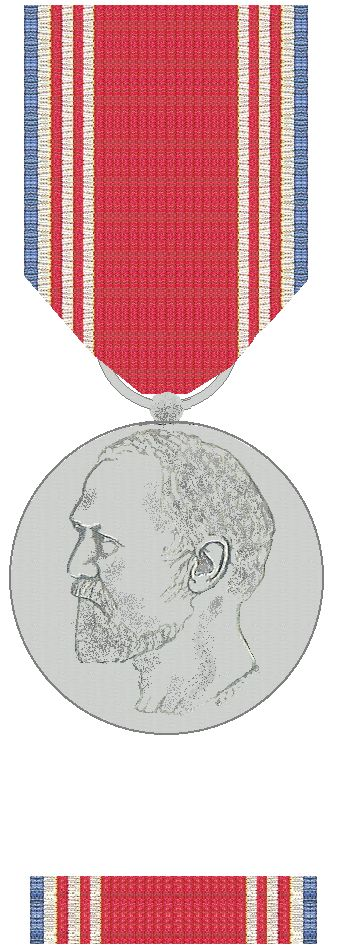
Dutch medal of the Carnegie Hero Fund

In 1904, he founded the Carnegie Hero Fund for the United States and Canada (a few years later also established in the United Kingdom, Switzerland, Norway, Sweden, France, Italy, the Netherlands, Belgium, Denmark, and Germany) for the recognition of deeds of heroism. Carnegie contributed $1.5 million in 1903 for the erection of the Peace Palace at The Hague; and he donated $150,000 for a Pan-American Palace in Washington as a home for the International Bureau of American Republics.

When it became obvious that Carnegie could not give away his entire fortune within his lifetime, he established the Carnegie Corporation of New York in 1911 "to promote the advancement and diffusion of knowledge and understanding" and continue his program of giving.

Carnegie was honored for his philanthropy and support of the arts by initiation as an honorary member of Phi Mu Alpha Sinfonia fraternity on October 14, 1917, at the New England Conservatory of Music in Boston, Massachusetts. The fraternity's mission reflects Carnegie's values by developing young men to share their talents to create harmony in the world.

=== Death ===
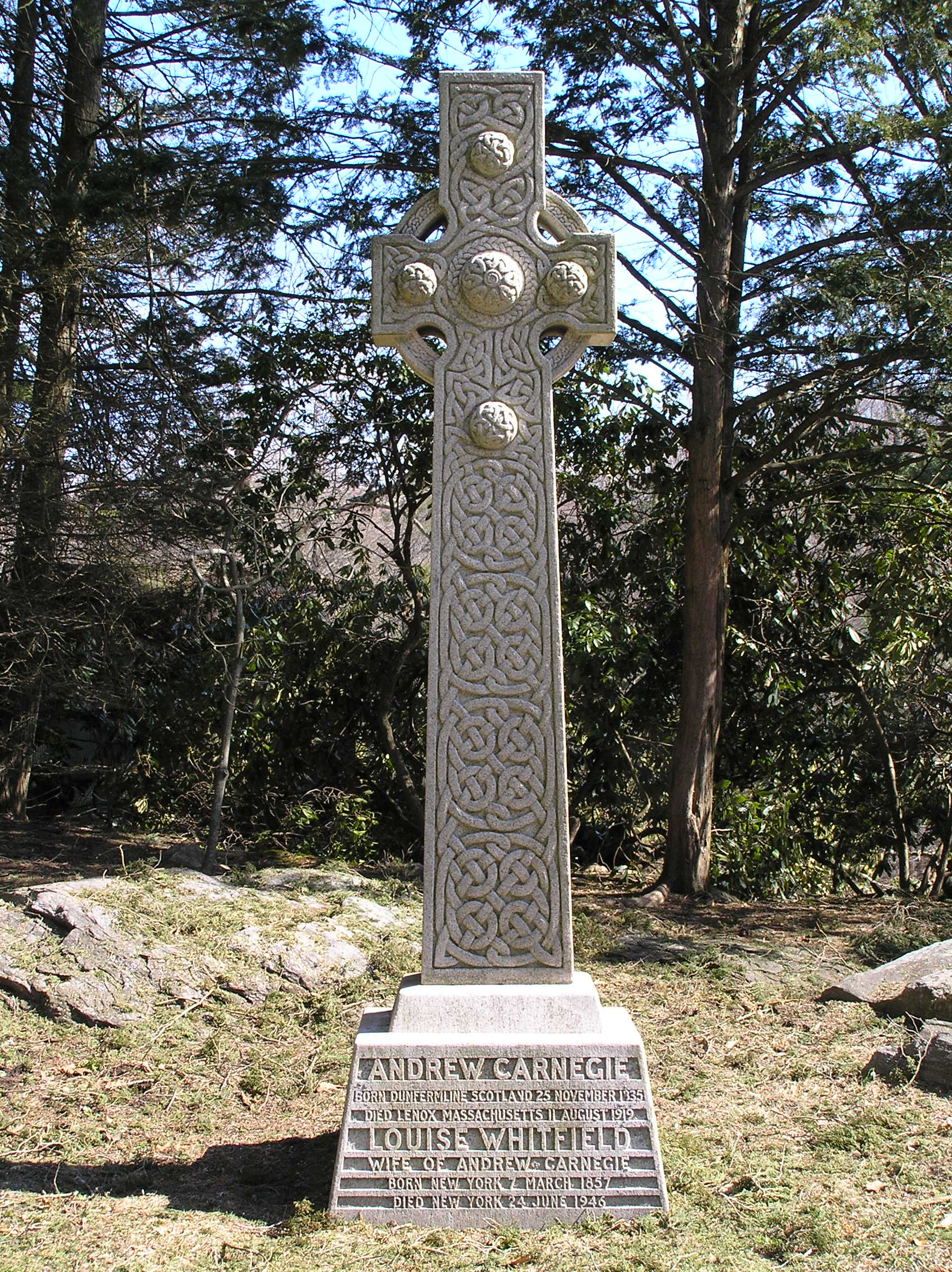
Andrew Carnegie's gravestone at Sleepy Hollow Cemetery in Sleepy Hollow, New York

Carnegie died on August 11, 1919, in Lenox, Massachusetts, at his Shadow Brook estate, of bronchial pneumonia. He had already given away $350,695,653 (approximately $6.9 billion in 2025 dollars) of his wealth. After his death, his last $30 million was given to foundations, charities, and to pensioners.

He was buried at Sleepy Hollow Cemetery in Sleepy Hollow, New York. His intentionally simple gravestone, in the form of the Celtic cross, is located on the Arcadia Hebron plot of land at the corner of Summit Avenue and Dingle Road. Carnegie is buried only a few yards away from union organizer Samuel Gompers, another important figure of industry in the Gilded Age.

== Controversies ==
=== 1889: Johnstown Flood ===
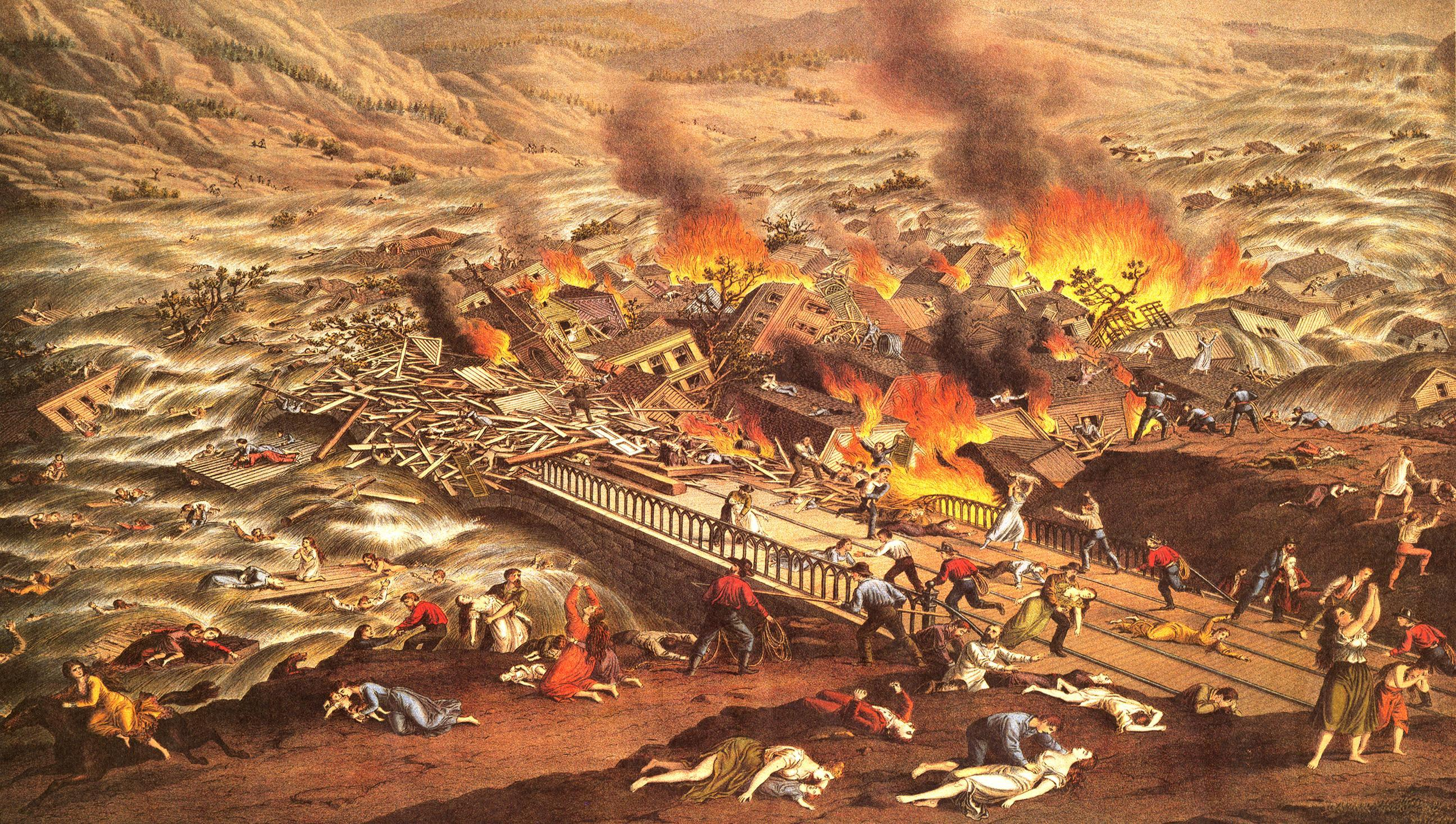
A contemporary rendition of the Johnstown Flood scene at the Stone Bridge by Kurz and Allison (1890)

Carnegie was one of more than 50 members of the South Fork Fishing and Hunting Club, which has been blamed for the Johnstown Flood that killed 2,209 people in 1889.

At the suggestion of his friend Benjamin Ruff, Carnegie's partner Henry Clay Frick had formed the exclusive South Fork Fishing and Hunting Club high above Johnstown, Pennsylvania. The sixty-odd club members were the leading business tycoons of Western Pennsylvania and included among their number Frick's best friend, Andrew Mellon, his attorneys Philander Knox and James Hay Reed, as well as Frick's business partner, Carnegie. High above the city, near the small town of South Fork, the South Fork Dam was originally built between 1838 and 1853 by the Commonwealth of Pennsylvania as part of a canal system to be used as a reservoir for a canal basin in Johnstown. With the coming-of-age of railroads superseding canal barge transport, the lake was abandoned by the Commonwealth, sold to the Pennsylvania Railroad, and sold again to private interests, and eventually came to be owned by the South Fork Fishing and Hunting Club in 1881. Prior to the flood, speculators had purchased the abandoned reservoir, made less than well-engineered repairs to the old dam, raised the lake level, built cottages and a clubhouse, and created the South Fork Fishing and Hunting Club. Less than 20 miles (32 km) downstream from the dam sat the city of Johnstown.

The dam was 72 feet (22 m) high and 931 feet (284 m) long. Between 1881, when the club was opened, and 1889, the dam frequently sprang leaks and was patched, mostly with mud and straw. Additionally, a previous owner removed and sold for scrap the three cast iron discharge pipes that previously allowed a controlled release of water. There had been some speculation as to the dam's integrity, and concerns had been raised by the head of the Cambria Iron Works downstream in Johnstown. Such repair work, a reduction in height, and unusually high snowmelt and heavy spring rains combined to cause the dam to give way on May 31, 1889, resulting in twenty million tons of water sweeping down the valley as the Johnstown Flood. When word of the dam's failure was telegraphed to Pittsburgh, Frick and other members of the South Fork Fishing and Hunting Club gathered to form the Pittsburgh Relief Committee for assistance to the flood victims as well as determining never to speak publicly about the club or the flood. This strategy was a success, and Knox and Reed were able to fend off all lawsuits that would have placed blame upon the club's members.

Although Cambria Iron and Steel's facilities were heavily damaged by the flood, they returned to full production within a year. After the flood, Carnegie built Johnstown a new library to replace the one built by Cambria's chief legal counsel Cyrus Elder, which was destroyed in the flood. The Carnegie-donated library is now owned by the Johnstown Area Heritage Association and houses the Flood Museum.

=== 1892: Homestead Strike ===
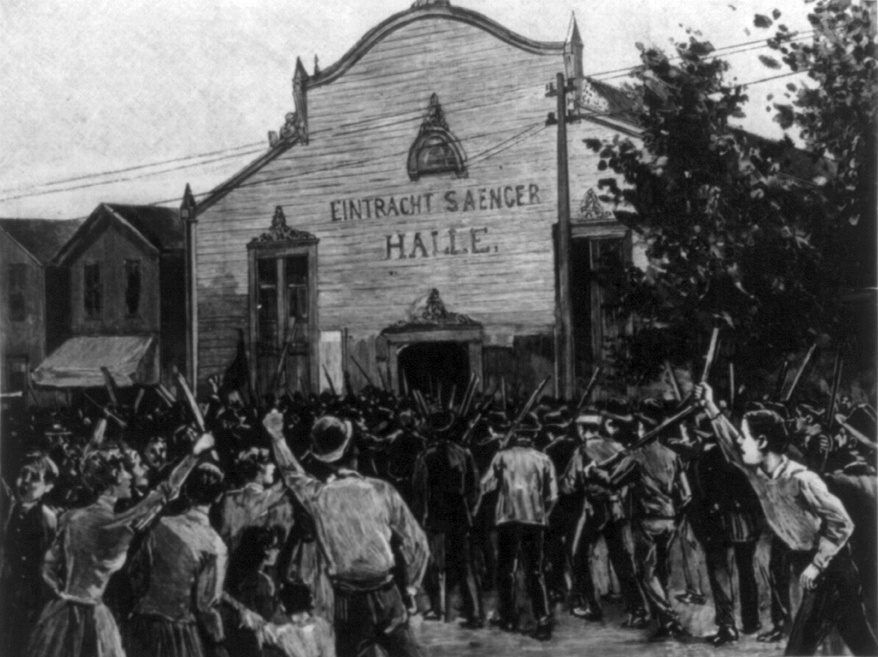
The Homestead Strike

The Homestead Strike was a bloody labor confrontation lasting 143 days in 1892, one of the most serious in U.S. history. The conflict was centered on Carnegie Steel's main plant in Homestead, Pennsylvania, and grew out of a labor dispute between the Amalgamated Association of Iron and Steel Workers (AA) and the Carnegie Steel Company.

Carnegie left on a trip to Scotland before the unrest peaked. In doing so, Carnegie left mediation of the dispute in the hands of his associate and partner Henry Clay Frick. Frick was well known in industrial circles for maintaining staunch anti-union sentiment. With the collective bargaining agreement between the union and company expiring at the end of June, Frick and the leaders of the local AA union entered into negotiations in February. With the steel industry doing well and prices higher, the AA asked for a wage increase; the AA represented about 800 of the 3,800 workers at the plant. Frick immediately countered with an average 22% wage decrease that would affect nearly half the union's membership and remove a number of positions from the bargaining unit.

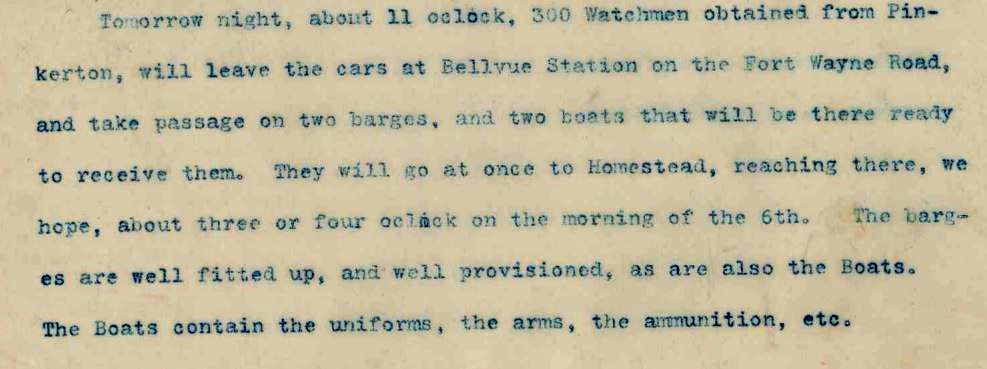
Frick's letter to Carnegie describing the plans and munitions that will be on the barges when the Pinkertons arrive to confront the strikers in Homestead

The union and company failed to come to an agreement, and management locked the union out. Workers considered the stoppage a "lockout" by management and not a "strike" by workers. As such, the workers would have been well within their rights to protest, and subsequent government action would have been a set of criminal procedures designed to crush what was seen as a pivotal demonstration of the growing labor rights movement, strongly opposed by management. Frick brought in thousands of strikebreakers to work the steel mills and Pinkerton agents to safeguard them.

On July 6, the arrival of a force of 300 Pinkerton agents from New York City and Chicago, Illinois, resulted in a fight in which 10 men—seven strikers and three Pinkertons—were killed and hundreds were injured. Pennsylvania Governor Robert Pattison ordered two brigades of the state militia to the strike site. Then allegedly in response to the fight between the striking workers and the Pinkertons, anarchist Alexander Berkman shot at Frick in an attempted assassination, wounding him. While not directly connected to the strike, Berkman was tied in for the assassination attempt. According to Berkman, "... with the elimination of Frick, responsibility for Homestead conditions would rest with Carnegie." Afterwards, the company successfully resumed operations with non-union immigrant employees in place of the Homestead plant workers, and Carnegie returned to the United States. However, Carnegie's reputation was permanently damaged by the Homestead events.

=== Theodore Roosevelt ===
According to David Nasaw, after 1898, when the United States entered a war with Spain, Carnegie increasingly devoted his energy to supporting pacifism. He strongly opposed the war and the subsequent imperialistic American takeover of the Philippines. When Theodore Roosevelt became president in 1901, Carnegie and Roosevelt were in frequent contact. They exchanged letters, communicated through mutual friends such as Secretary of State John Hay, and met in person. Carnegie hoped that Roosevelt would turn the Philippines free. He saluted Roosevelt for forcing Germany and Britain to arbitrate their conflict with Venezuela in 1903, and especially for becoming the mediator who negotiated an end to the war between Russia and Japan in 1907–1908.

Roosevelt relied on Carnegie for financing his expedition to Africa in 1909. In return he asked the ex-president to mediate the growing conflict between the cousins who ruled Britain and Germany. Roosevelt started to do so but the scheme collapsed when king Edward VII suddenly died. Nasaw argues that Roosevelt systematically deceived and manipulated Carnegie and held the elderly man in contempt. Nasaw quotes a private letter Roosevelt wrote to Whitelaw Reid in 1905:

[I have] tried hard to like Carnegie, but it is pretty difficult. There is no type of man for whom I feel a more contemptuous abhorrence than for the one who makes a God of mere money-making and at the same time is always yelling out that kind of utterly stupid condemnation of war which in almost every case springs from a combination of defective physical courage, of unmanly shrinking from pain and effort, and of hopelessly twisted ideals. All the suffering from Spanish war comes far short of the suffering, preventable and non-preventable, among the operators of the Carnegie steel works, and among the small investors, during the time that Carnegie was making his fortune…. It is as noxious folly to denounce war per se as it is to denounce business per se. Unrighteous war is a hideous evil; but I am not at all sure that it is worse evil than business unrighteousness.

== Personal life ==
=== Family ===
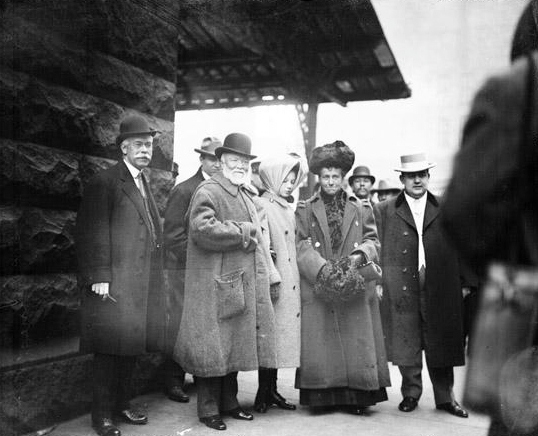
Andrew Carnegie with his wife Louise Whitfield Carnegie and their daughter Margaret Carnegie Miller in 1910

Carnegie did not want to marry during his mother's lifetime, instead choosing to take care of her in her illness towards the end of her life. After she died in 1886, the 51-year-old Carnegie married Louise Whitfield, who was 21 years his junior. In 1897, the couple had their only child, Margaret, whom they named after Carnegie's mother.

=== Residences ===
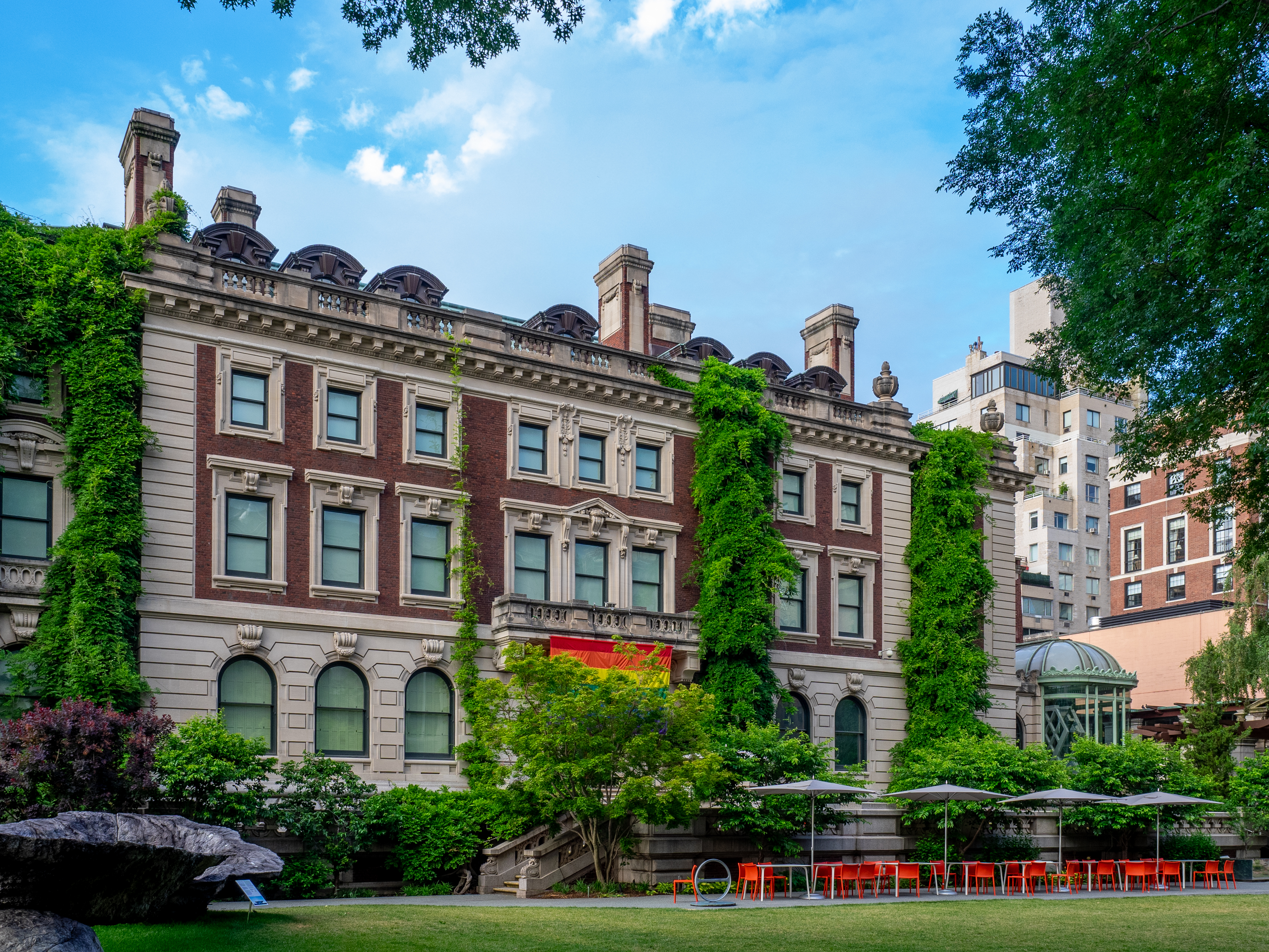
The Andrew Carnegie Mansion, located on 5th Avenue on the Upper East Side, Manhattan, New York

Carnegie bought Skibo Castle in Scotland in 1898 for some $85,000. He and his small family spent most summers there, traveling between Scotland and his adopted United States by ocean liner.

The Carnegies made their home partly at Skibo and partly in their New York mansion located at 2 East 91st Street at Fifth Avenue. The mansion was completed in late 1902. Carnegie lived there until his death in 1919, and his wife Louise continued to live there until her death in 1946. The building has been used since 1976 as the Cooper-Hewitt, Smithsonian Design Museum, part of the Smithsonian Institution. The surrounding neighborhood on Manhattan's Upper East Side has come to be called Carnegie Hill. The mansion was designated as a National Historic Landmark in 1966.

== Philosophy ==
=== Politics ===
Carnegie gave "formal allegiance" to the Republican Party, though he was said to be "a violent opponent of some of the most sacred doctrines" of the party.

=== Andrew Carnegie Dictum ===
In his final days, Carnegie had pneumonia. Before his death on August 11, 1919, Carnegie had donated $350,695,654 for various causes. The "Andrew Carnegie Dictum" was:

- To spend the first third of one's life getting all the education one can.
- To spend the next third making all the money one can.
- To spend the last third giving it all away for worthwhile causes.

Carnegie was involved in philanthropic causes, but he kept himself away from religious circles. He wanted to be identified by the world as a "positivist". He was highly influenced in public life by John Bright.

=== On wealth ===
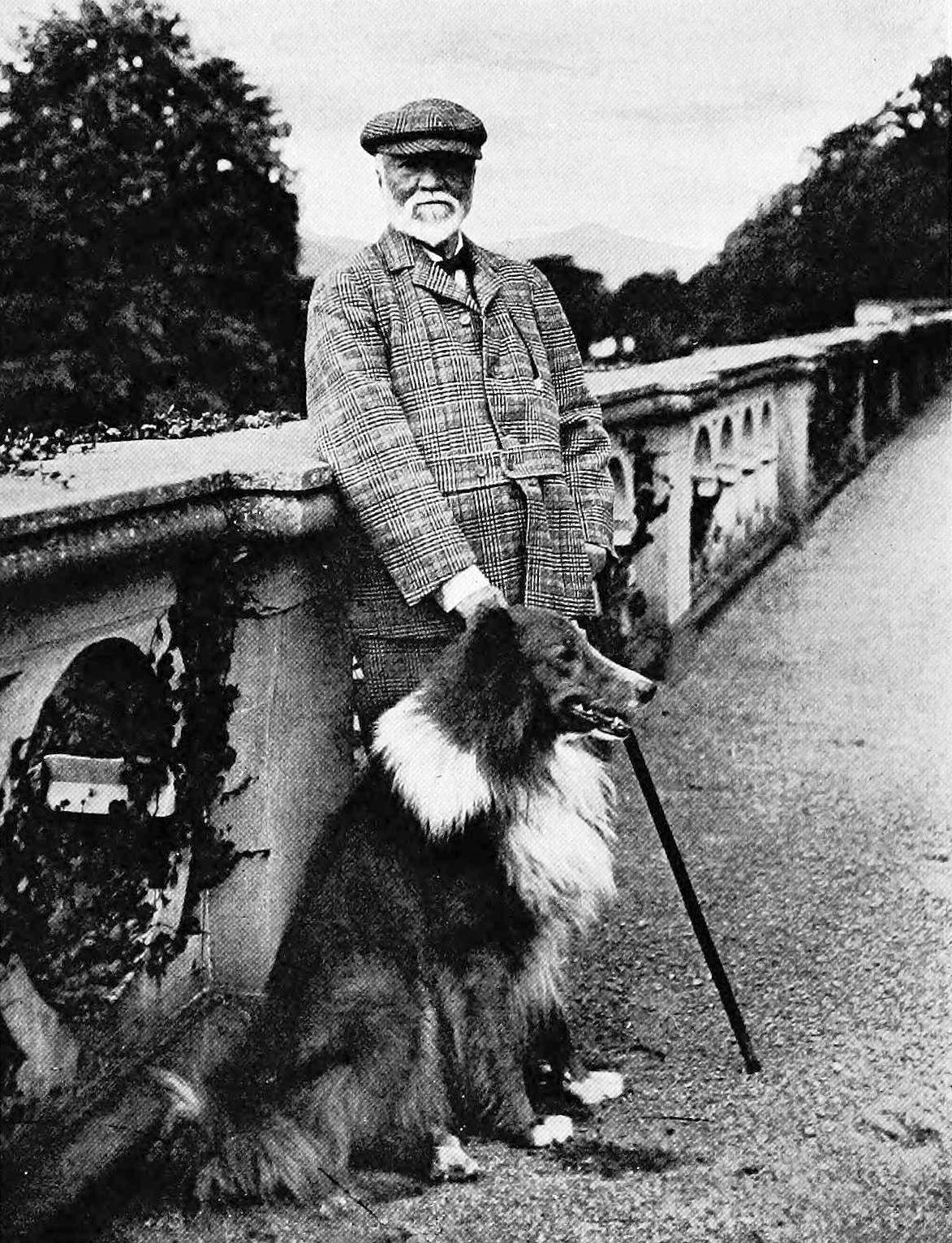
Carnegie at Skibo Castle, 1914

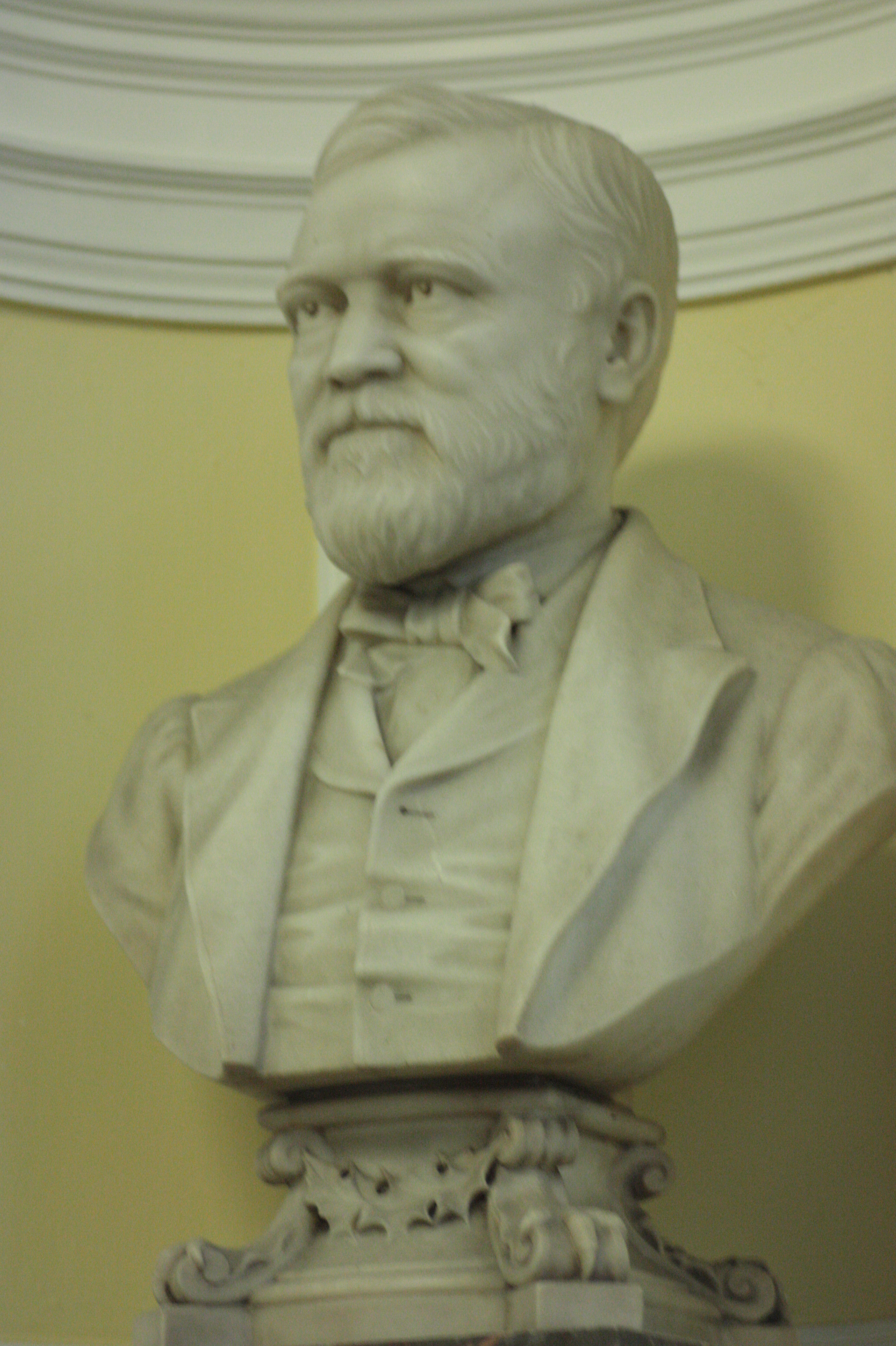
Andrew Carnegie by Charles McBride, Edinburgh Central Library

As early as 1868, at age 33, he drafted a memo to himself. He wrote: "... The amassing of wealth is one of the worse species of idolatry. No idol more debasing than the worship of money." In order to avoid degrading himself, he wrote in the same memo he would retire at age 35 to pursue the practice of philanthropic giving, for "... the man who dies thus rich dies disgraced." However, he did not begin his philanthropic work in earnest until 1881, at age 46, when he gifted a library to his hometown of Dunfermline, Scotland.

Carnegie wrote "The Gospel of Wealth", an article in which he stated his belief that the rich should use their wealth to help enrich society. In that article, Carnegie also expressed sympathy for the ideas of progressive taxation and an estate tax:

The growing disposition to tax more and more heavily large estates left at death is a cheering indication of the growth of a salutary change in public opinion. The State of Pennsylvania now takes—subject to some exceptions—one-tenth of the property left by its citizens. The budget presented in the British Parliament the other day proposes to increase the death duties; and, most significant of all, the new tax is to be a graduated one. Of all forms of taxation, this seems the wisest. Men who continue hoarding great sums all their lives, the proper use of which for public ends would work good to the community from which it chiefly came, should be made to feel that the community, in the form of the State, cannot thus be deprived of its proper share. By taxing estates heavily at death the State marks its condemnation of the selfish millionaire's unworthy life.

The following is taken from one of Carnegie's memos to himself:

Man does not live by bread alone. I have known millionaires starving for lack of the nutriment which alone can sustain all that is human in man, and I know workmen, and many so-called poor men, who revel in luxuries beyond the power of those millionaires to reach. It is the mind that makes the body rich. There is no class so pitiably wretched as that which possesses money and nothing else. Money can only be the useful drudge of things immeasurably higher than itself. Exalted beyond this, as it sometimes is, it remains Caliban still and still plays the beast. My aspirations take a higher flight. Mine be it to have contributed to the enlightenment and the joys of the mind, to the things of the spirit, to all that tends to bring into the lives of the toilers of Pittsburgh sweetness and light. I hold this the noblest possible use of wealth.

=== Intellectual influences ===
==== Herbert Spencer; evolutionary thought ====
Carnegie claimed to be a champion of evolutionary thought—particularly the work of Herbert Spencer, even declaring Spencer his teacher.

... I came fortunately upon Darwin's and Spencer's works "The Data of Ethics," "First Principles," "Social Statics," "The Descent of Man." Reaching the pages which explain how man has absorbed such mental foods as were favorable to him, retaining what was salutary, rejecting what was deleterious, I remember that light came as in a flood and all was clear. Not only had I got rid of theology and the supernatural, but I had found the truth of evolution. "All is well since all grows better" became my motto, my true source of comfort. Man was not created with an instinct for his own degradation, but from the lower he had risen to the higher forms. Nor is there any conceivable end to his march to perfection. His face is turned to the light; he stands in the sun and looks upward.

However although Carnegie claimed to be a disciple of Spencer, many of his actions went against the ideas he espoused.

Spencerian evolution was for individual rights and against government interference. Furthermore, Spencerian evolution held that those unfit to sustain themselves must be allowed to perish. Spencer believed that just as there were many varieties of beetles, respectively modified to existence in a particular place in nature, so too had human society "spontaneously fallen into division of labour". Individuals who survived to this, the latest and highest stage of evolutionary progress would be "those in whom the power of self-preservation is the greatest—are the select of their generation." Moreover, Spencer perceived governmental authority as borrowed from the people to perform the transitory aims of establishing social cohesion, insurance of rights, and security. Spencerian 'survival of the fittest' firmly credits any provisions made to assist the weak, unskilled, poor and distressed to be an imprudent disservice to evolution. Spencer insisted people should resist for the benefit of collective humanity, as severe fate singles out the weak, debauched, and disabled.

==== Laissez-faire economics ====
Andrew Carnegie's political and economic focus during the late nineteenth and early twentieth century was the defense of laissez-faire economics. Carnegie emphatically resisted government intrusion in commerce, as well as government-sponsored charities. Carnegie believed the concentration of capital was essential for societal progress and should be encouraged. Carnegie was an ardent supporter of commercial "survival of the fittest" and sought to attain immunity from business challenges by dominating all phases of the steel manufacturing procedure. Carnegie's determination to lower costs included cutting labor expenses. In a notably Spencerian manner, Carnegie argued that unions impeded the natural reduction of prices by pushing up costs, which blocked evolutionary progress. Carnegie felt that unions represented the narrow interest of the few while his actions benefited the entire community.

On the surface, Andrew Carnegie appears to be a strict laissez-faire capitalist and follower of Herbert Spencer, often referring to himself as a disciple of Spencer. Conversely, Carnegie, a titan of industry, seems to embody all of the qualities of Spencerian survival of the fittest. The two men enjoyed a mutual respect for one another and maintained a correspondence until Spencer's death in 1903. There are, however, some major discrepancies between Spencer's capitalist evolutionary conceptions and Andrew Carnegie's capitalist practices.

==== Market concentration ====
Spencer wrote that in production the advantages of the superior individual are comparatively minor, and thus acceptable, yet the benefit that dominance provides those who control a large segment of production might be hazardous to competition. Spencer feared that an absence of "sympathetic self-restraint" of those with too much power could lead to the ruin of their competitors. He did not think free-market competition necessitated competitive warfare. Furthermore, Spencer argued that individuals with superior resources who deliberately used investment schemes to put competitors out of business were committing acts of "commercial murder". Carnegie built his wealth in the steel industry by maintaining an extensively integrated operating system. Carnegie also bought out some regional competitors, and merged with others, usually maintaining the majority shares in the companies. Over the course of twenty years, Carnegie's steel properties grew to include the Edgar Thomson Steel Works, the Lucy Furnace Works, the Union Iron Mills, the Homestead Works, the Keystone Bridge Works, the Hartman Steel Works, the Frick Coke Company, and the Scotia ore mines among many other industry-related assets.

Herbert Spencer absolutely was against government interference in business in the form of regulatory limitations, taxes, and tariffs as well. Spencer saw tariffs as a form of taxation that levied against the majority in service to "the benefit of a small minority of manufacturers and artisans".

Despite Carnegie's personal dedication to Herbert Spencer as a friend, his adherence to Spencer's political and economic ideas is more contentious. In particular, it appears Carnegie either misunderstood or intentionally misrepresented some of Spencer's principal arguments. Spencer remarked upon his first visit to Carnegie's steel mills in Pittsburgh, which Carnegie saw as the manifestation of Spencer's philosophy, "Six months' residence here would justify suicide."

The conditions of human society create for this an imperious demand; the concentration of capital is a necessity for meeting the demands of our day, and as such should not be looked at askance, but be encouraged. There is nothing detrimental to human society in it, but much that is, or is bound soon to become, beneficial. It is an evolution from the heterogeneous to the homogeneous, and is clearly another step in the upward path of development.

— Carnegie, Andrew 1901 The Gospel of Wealth and Other Timely Essays

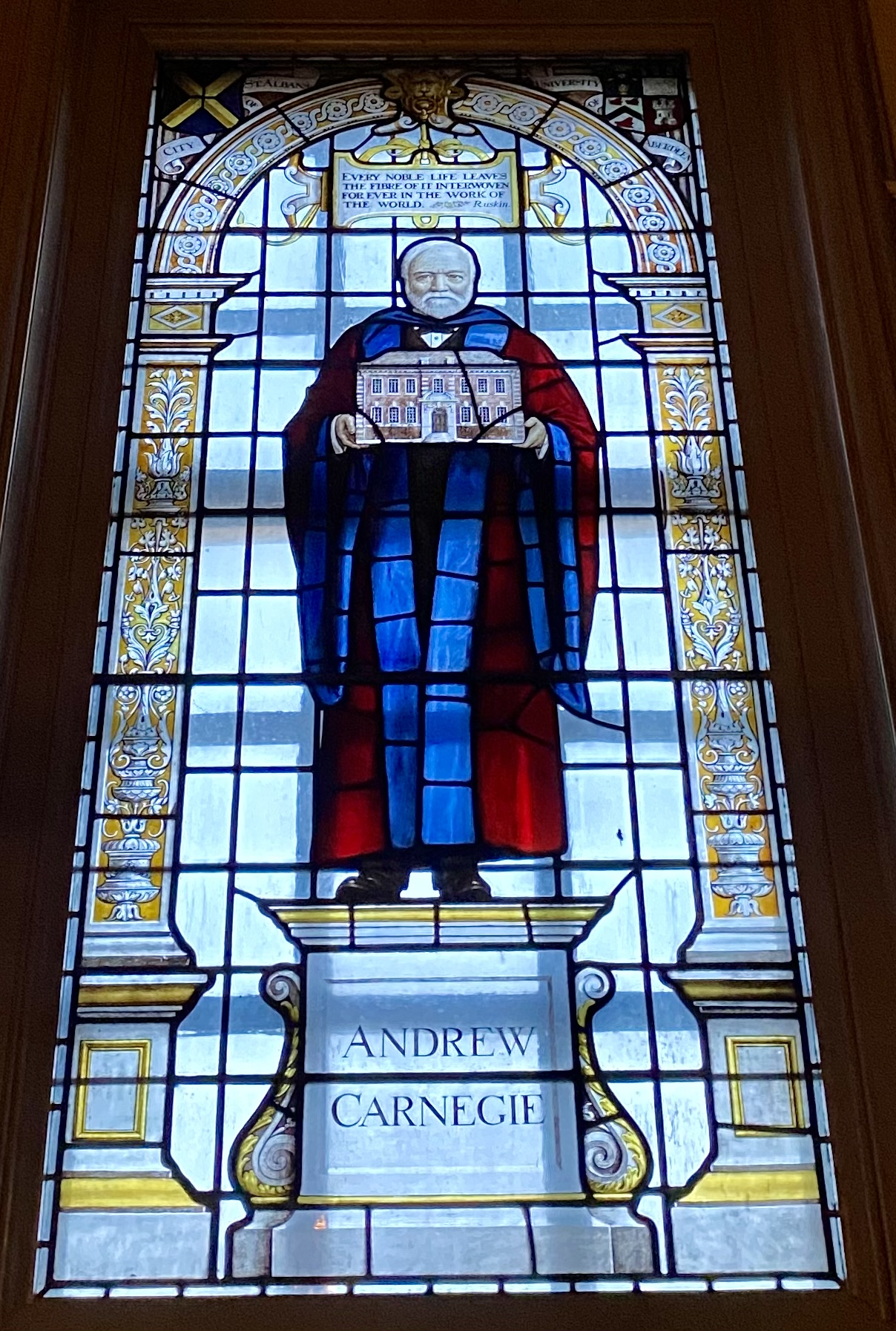
Stained-glass window of Andrew Carnegie at the former Carnegie Library, St Albans, Hertfordshire

==== Charitable institutions ====
On the subject of charity, Andrew Carnegie's actions diverged in the most significant and complex manner from Herbert Spencer's philosophies. In his 1854 essay "Manners and Fashion", Spencer referred to public education as "Old schemes". He went on to declare that public schools and colleges fill the heads of students with inept, useless knowledge and exclude useful knowledge. Spencer stated that he trusted no organization of any kind, "political, religious, literary, philanthropic", and believed that as they expanded in influence so too did their regulations expand. In addition, Spencer thought that as all institutions grow they become ever more corrupted by the influence of power and money. The institution eventually loses its "original spirit, and sinks into a lifeless mechanism". Spencer insisted that all forms of philanthropy that uplift the poor and downtrodden were reckless and incompetent. Spencer thought any attempt to prevent "the really salutary sufferings" of the less fortunate "bequeath to posterity a continually increasing curse". Carnegie, a self-proclaimed devotee of Spencer, testified to Congress on February 5, 1915: "My business is to do as much good in the world as I can; I have retired from all other business."

==== Charity to enable people to develop ====
Carnegie held that societal progress relied on individuals who maintained moral obligations to themselves and to society. Furthermore, he believed that charity supplied the means for those who wish to improve themselves to achieve their goals. Carnegie urged other wealthy people to contribute to society in the form of parks, works of art, libraries and other endeavors that improve the community and contribute to the "lasting good". Carnegie also held a strong opinion against inherited wealth. Carnegie believed that the sons of prosperous businesspersons were rarely as talented as their fathers. By leaving large sums of money to their children, wealthy business leaders were wasting resources that could be used to benefit society. Most notably, Carnegie believed that the future leaders of society would rise from the ranks of the poor. Carnegie strongly believed in this because he had risen from the bottom. He believed the poor possessed an advantage over the wealthy because they receive greater attention from their parents and are taught better work ethics.

=== Religion and worldview ===
Carnegie and his family belonged to the Presbyterian Church in the United States of America, also known informally as the Northern Presbyterian Church. In his early life Carnegie was skeptical of Calvinism, and religion as a whole, but reconciled with it later in his life. In his autobiography, Carnegie describes his family as moderate Presbyterian believers, writing that "there was not one orthodox Presbyterian" in his family; various members of his family having somewhat distanced themselves from Calvinism, some of them leaning more towards Swedenborgianism. While a child, his family led vigorous theological and political disputes. His mother avoided the topic of religion. His father left the Presbyterian church after a sermon on infant damnation, while, according to Carnegie, still remaining very religious on his own.

Witnessing sectarianism and strife in 19th century Scotland regarding religion and philosophy, Carnegie kept his distance from organized religion and theism. Carnegie instead preferred to see things through naturalistic and scientific terms stating, "Not only had I got rid of the theology and the supernatural, but I had found the truth of evolution."

Later in life, Carnegie's firm opposition to religion softened. For many years he was a member of Madison Avenue Presbyterian Church, pastored from 1905 to 1926 by Social Gospel exponent Henry Sloane Coffin, while his wife and daughter belonged to the Brick Presbyterian Church. He also prepared (but did not deliver) an address in which he professed a belief in "an Infinite and Eternal Energy from which all things proceed". Records exist of a short period of correspondence around 1912–1913 between Carnegie and 'Abdu'l-Bahá, the eldest son of Bahá'u'lláh, founder of the Baháʼí Faith. In these letters, one of which was published in The New York Times in full text, Carnegie is extolled as a "lover of the world of humanity and one of the founders of Universal Peace".

=== World peace ===
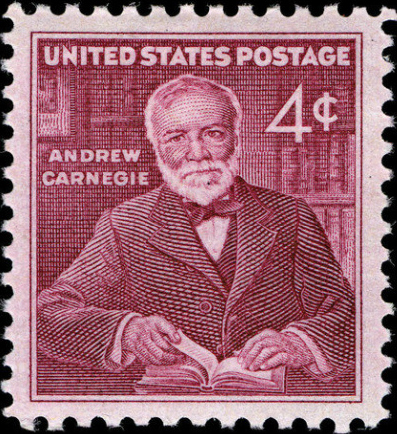
Carnegie commemorated as an industrialist, philanthropist, and founder of the Carnegie Endowment for International Peace, 1960

Influenced by his "favorite living hero in public life", John Bright, Carnegie started his efforts in pursuit of world peace at a young age, and he supported causes that opposed military intervention. His motto, "All is well since all grows better", served not only as a good rationalization of his successful business career but also his view of international relations.

Despite his efforts towards international peace, Carnegie faced many dilemmas on his quest. These dilemmas are often regarded as conflicts between his view on international relations and his other loyalties. Throughout the 1880s and 1890s, for example, Carnegie allowed his steel works to fill large orders of armor plate for the building of an enlarged and modernized United States Navy, but he opposed American overseas expansion.

Despite that, Carnegie served as a major donor for the newly established International Court of Arbitration's Peace Palace—brainchild of Russian tsar Nicholas II.

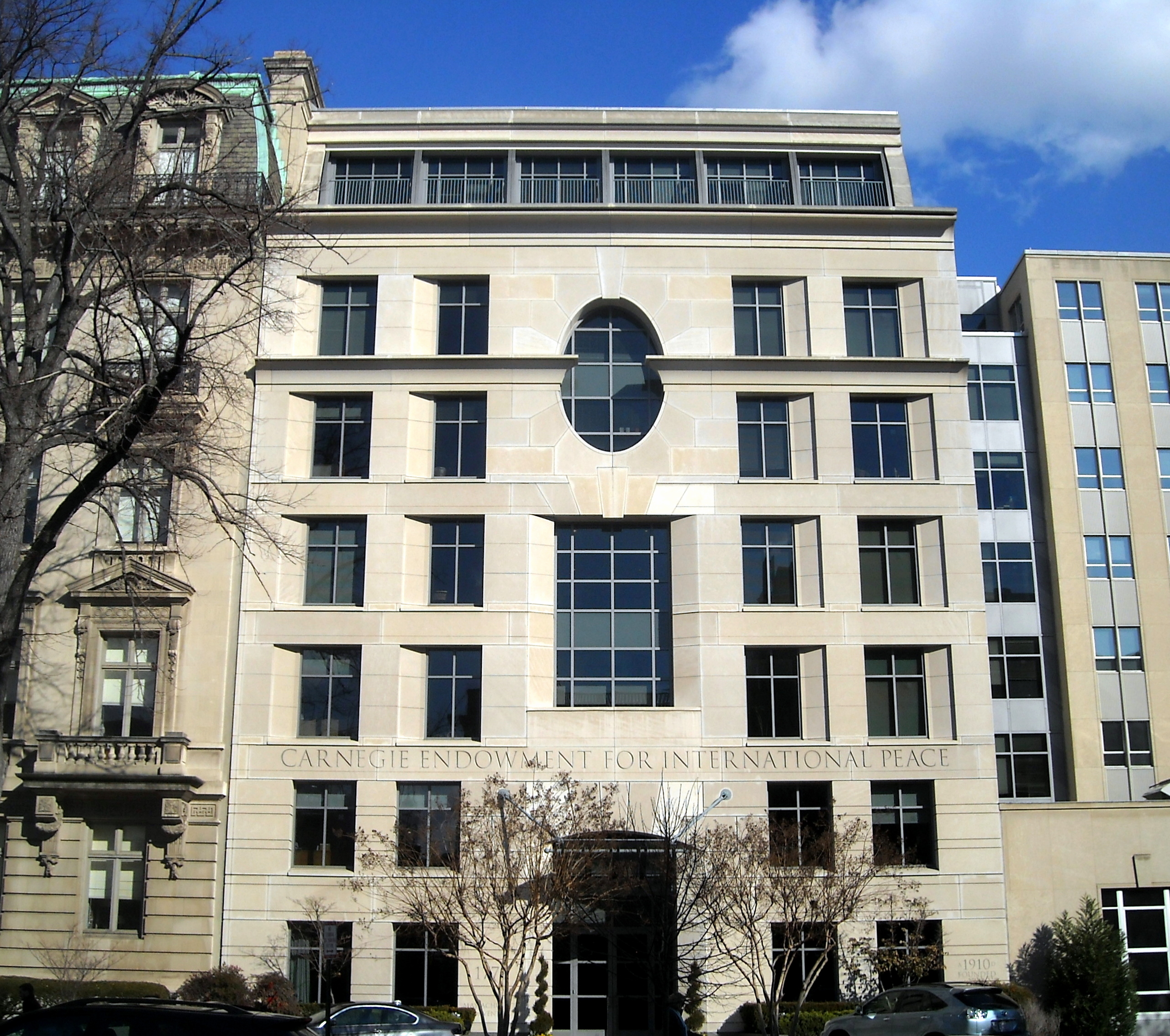
The Washington, D.C. headquarters of the Carnegie Endowment for International Peace

His largest and, in the long run, most influential peace organization was the Carnegie Endowment for International Peace, formed in 1910 with a $10 million endowment. In 1913, at the dedication of the Peace Palace in The Hague, Carnegie predicted that the end of the war was as certain to come, and come soon, as day follows night.

In 1914, on the eve of the First World War, Carnegie founded the Church Peace Union (CPU), a group of leaders in religion, academia, and politics. Through the CPU, Carnegie hoped to mobilize the world's churches, religious organizations, and other spiritual and moral resources to join in promoting moral leadership to put an end to war forever. For its inaugural international event, the CPU sponsored a conference to be held on August 1, 1914, on the shores of Lake Constance in southern Germany. As the delegates made their way to the conference by train, Germany was invading Belgium.

Despite its inauspicious beginning, the CPU thrived. Today its focus is on ethics, and it is known as the Carnegie Council for Ethics in International Affairs, an independent, nonpartisan, nonprofit organization, whose mission is to be the voice for ethics in international affairs.

The outbreak of the First World War was clearly a shock to Carnegie and his optimistic view on world peace. Although his promotion of anti-imperialism and world peace had all failed, and the Carnegie Endowment had not fulfilled his expectations, his beliefs and ideas on international relations had helped build the foundation of the League of Nations after his death, which took attempts at world peace to another level.

=== United States colonial expansion ===
On the matter of American colonial expansion, Carnegie had always thought it is an unwise gesture for the United States. He did not oppose the annexation of the Hawaiian islands or Puerto Rico, but he opposed the annexation of the Philippines. Carnegie believed that it involved a denial of the fundamental democratic principle, and he also urged William McKinley to withdraw American troops and allow the Filipinos to live with their independence. This act strongly impressed the other American anti-imperialists, who soon elected him vice-president of the Anti-Imperialist League.

After he sold his steel company in 1901, Carnegie was able to get fully involved in the peace cause, both financially and personally. He gave away much of his fortune to various peacekeeping agencies in order to keep them growing. When a friend, the British writer William T. Stead, asked him to create a new organization for the goal of a peace and arbitration society, his reply was:

I do not see that it is wise to devote our efforts to creating another organization. Of course I may be wrong in believing that, but I am certainly not wrong that if it were dependent on any millionaire's money it would begin as an object of pity and end as one of derision. I wonder that you do not see this. There is nothing that robs a righteous cause of its strength more than a millionaire's money. Its life is tainted thereby.

Carnegie believed that it is the effort and will of the people, that maintains the peace in international relations. Money is just a push for the act. If world peace depended solely on financial support, it would not seem a goal, but more like an act of pity.

Like Stead, he believed that the United States and the British Empire would merge into one nation, telling him "We are heading straight to the Re-United States". Carnegie believed that the combined country's power would maintain world peace and disarmament. The creation of the Carnegie Endowment for International Peace in 1910 was regarded as a milestone on the road to the ultimate goal of abolition of war. Beyond a gift of $10 million for peace promotion, Carnegie also encouraged the "scientific" investigation of the various causes of war, and the adoption of judicial methods that should eventually eliminate them. He believed that the Carnegie Endowment exists to promote information on the nations' rights and responsibilities under existing international law and to encourage other conferences to codify this law.

== Legacy and honors ==
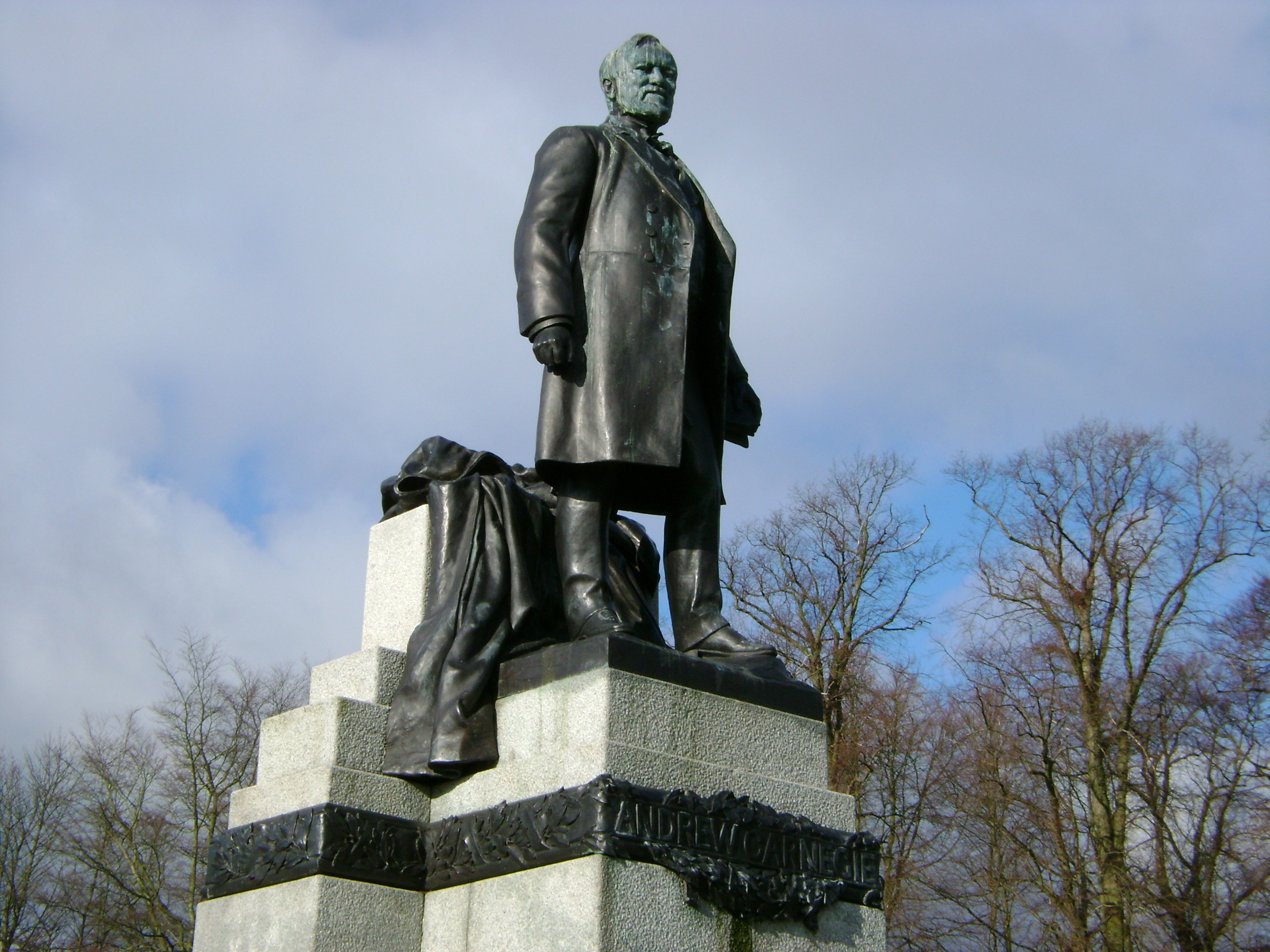
Carnegie statue, Dunfermline

In 1899, Andrew Carnegie was awarded American Library Association Honorary Membership.

Carnegie received the honorary Doctor of Laws (DLL) from the University of Glasgow in June 1901, and received the Freedom of the City of Glasgow "in recognition of his munificence" later the same year.

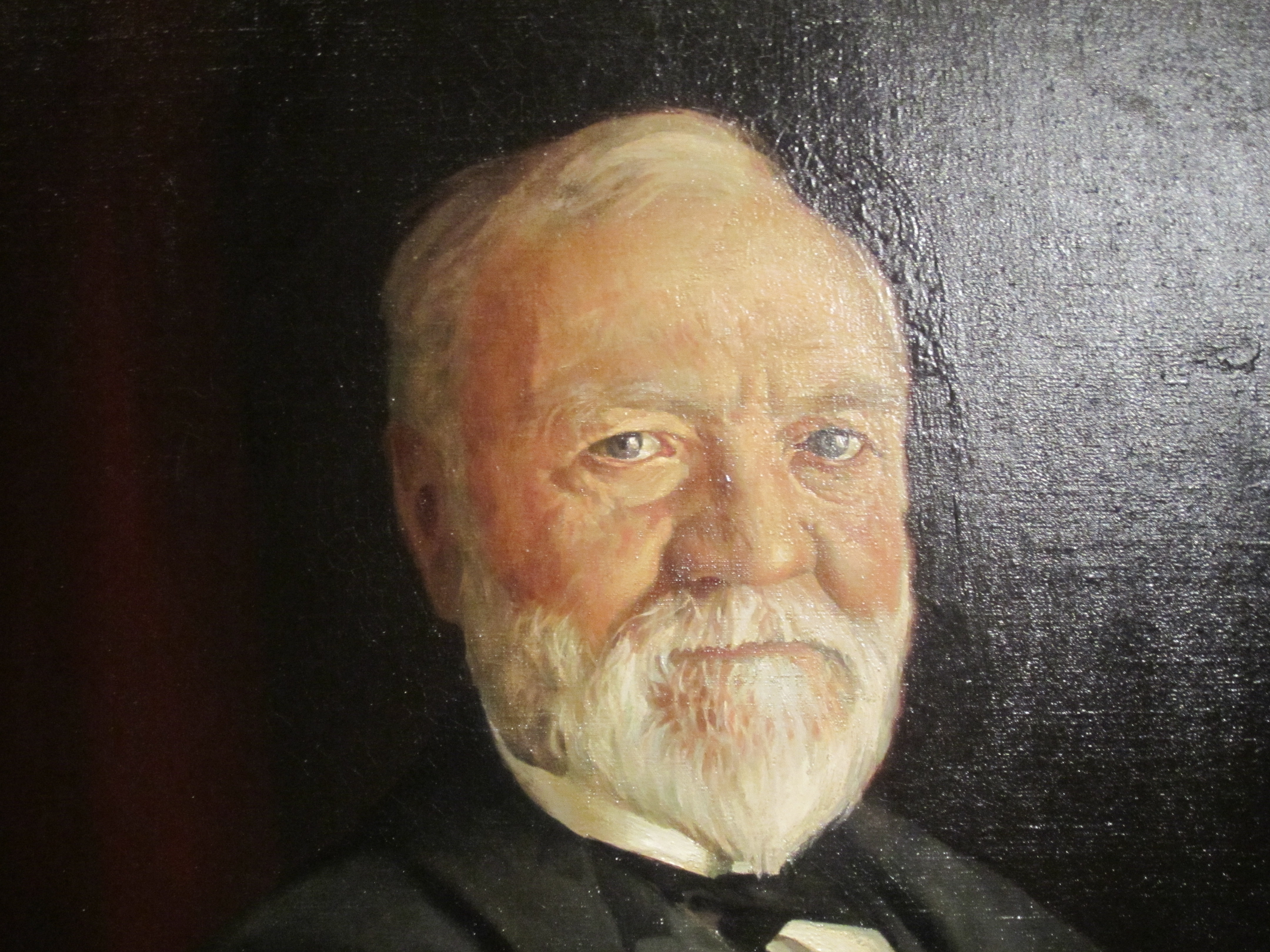
Carnegie as he appears in the National Portrait Gallery in Washington, D.C.

In July 1902, he received the Freedom of the city of St Andrews, "in testimony of his great zeal for the welfare of his fellow-men on both sides of the Atlantic", and in October 1902 the Freedom of the City of Perth "in testimony of his high personal worth and beneficial influence, and in recognition of widespread benefactions bestowed on this and other lands, and especially in gratitude for the endowment granted by him for the promotion of University education in Scotland." and the Freedom of the City of Dundee. Also in 1902, he was elected as a member to the American Philosophical Society.

He received an honorary Doctor of Laws (LLD) from the University of Aberdeen in 1906. In 1907, the American Society of Mechanical Engineers elected him an honorary member. In 1910, he received the Freedom of the City of Belfast and was made as well Commander of the National Order of the Legion of Honour by the French government. Carnegie was awarded as Knight Grand Cross of the Order of Orange-Nassau by Queen Wilhelmina of the Netherlands on August 25, 1913. Carnegie received July 1, 1914, an honorary doctorate from the University of Groningen the Netherlands.

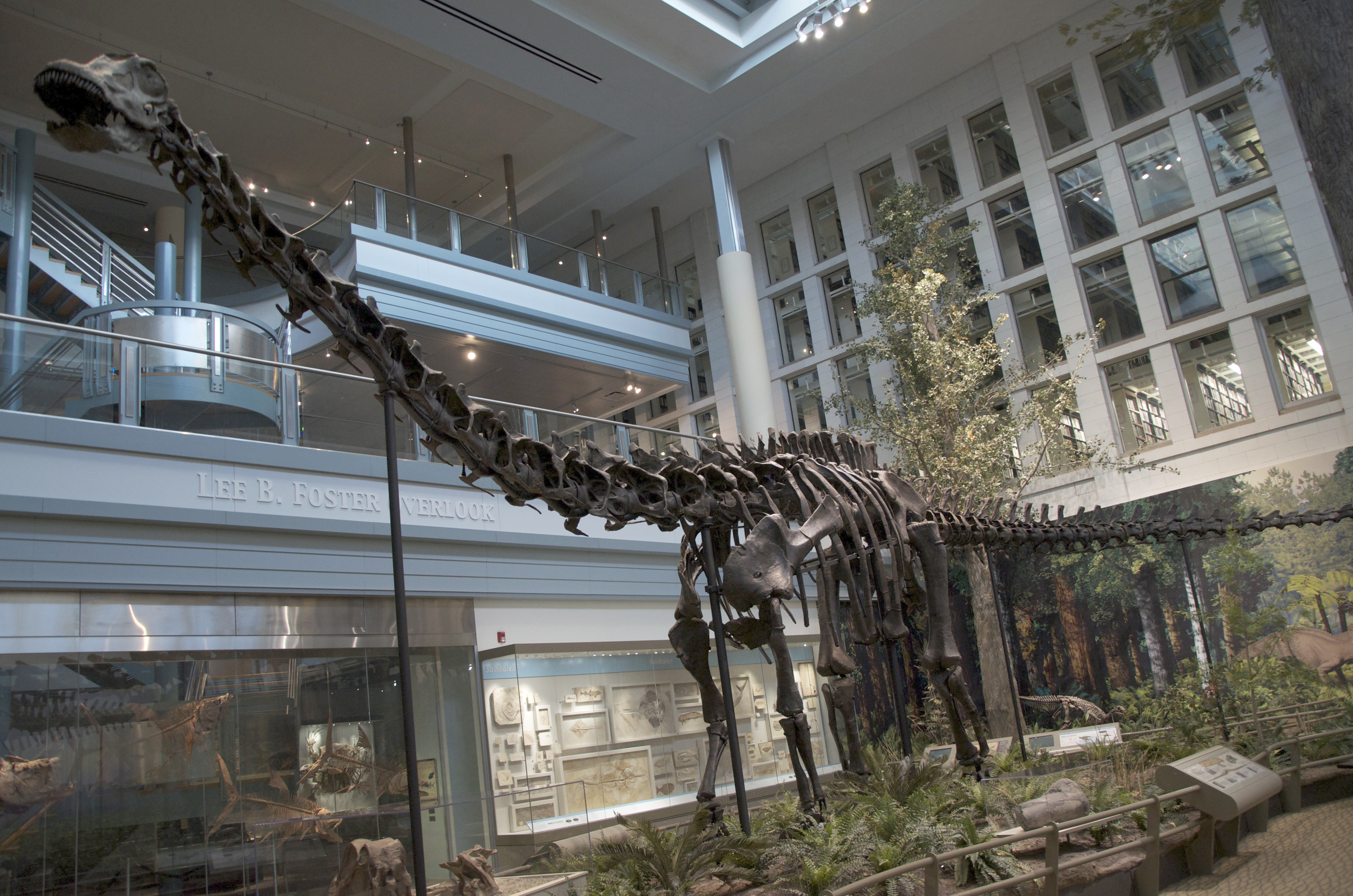
Mounted Diplodocus carnegii (or "Dippy") skeleton at the Carnegie Museum of Natural History; considered the most famous single dinosaur skeleton in the world

- The dinosaur Diplodocus carnegii Hatcher, 1901, was named for Carnegie after he sponsored the expedition that discovered its remains in the Morrison Formation (Jurassic) of Utah. Carnegie was so proud of "Dippy" that he had casts made of the bones and plaster replicas of the whole skeleton donated to several museums in Europe and South America. The original fossil skeleton is assembled and stands in the Hall of Dinosaurs at the Carnegie Museum of Natural History in Pittsburgh, Pennsylvania.
- After the Spanish–American War, Carnegie offered to donate $20 million to the Philippines so they could buy their independence.
- Carnegie, Pennsylvania, and Carnegie, Oklahoma, were named in his honor.
- The Saguaro cactus's scientific name, Carnegiea gigantea, is named after him.
- The Carnegie Medal for the best children's literature published in the UK was established in his name.
- The Carnegie Faculty of Sport and Education, at Leeds Beckett University, UK, is named after him.
- The concert halls in Dunfermline and New York are named after him.
- At the height of his career, Carnegie was the second-richest person in the world, behind only John D. Rockefeller of Standard Oil.
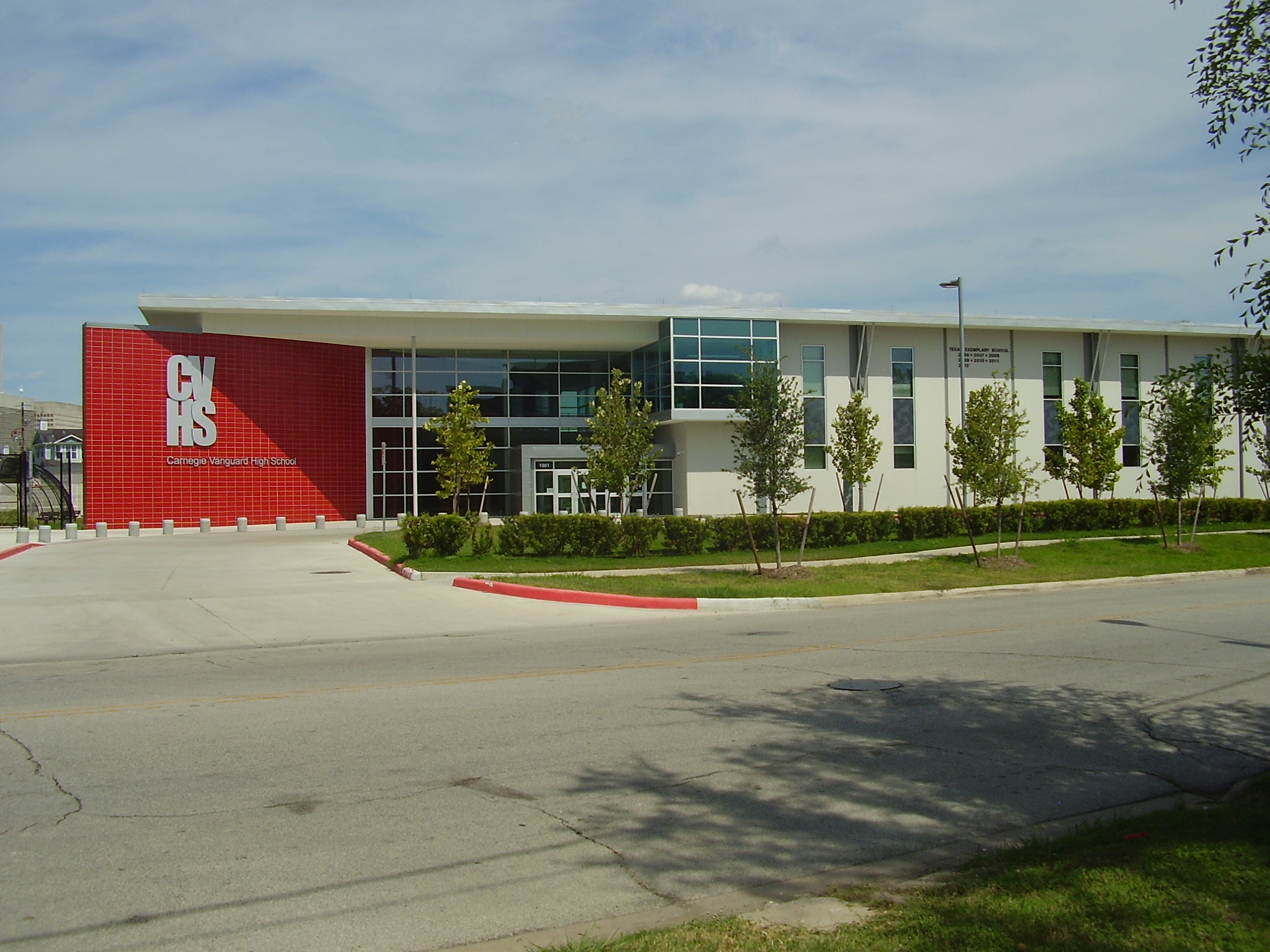
  Carnegie Vanguard High School
- Carnegie Mellon University in Pittsburgh was named after Carnegie, who founded the institution as the Carnegie Technical Schools.
- Lauder College (named after his uncle George Lauder Sr.) in the Halbeath area of Dunfermline was renamed Carnegie College in 2007.
- A street in Belgrade, next to the Belgrade University Library which is one of the Carnegie libraries, is named in his honor.
- An American high school, Carnegie Vanguard High School in Houston, Texas, is named after him
- Carnegie was awarded the Freedom of the Burgh of Kilmarnock in Scotland in 1903, prior to laying the foundation stone of Loanhead Public School.

=== Benefactions ===
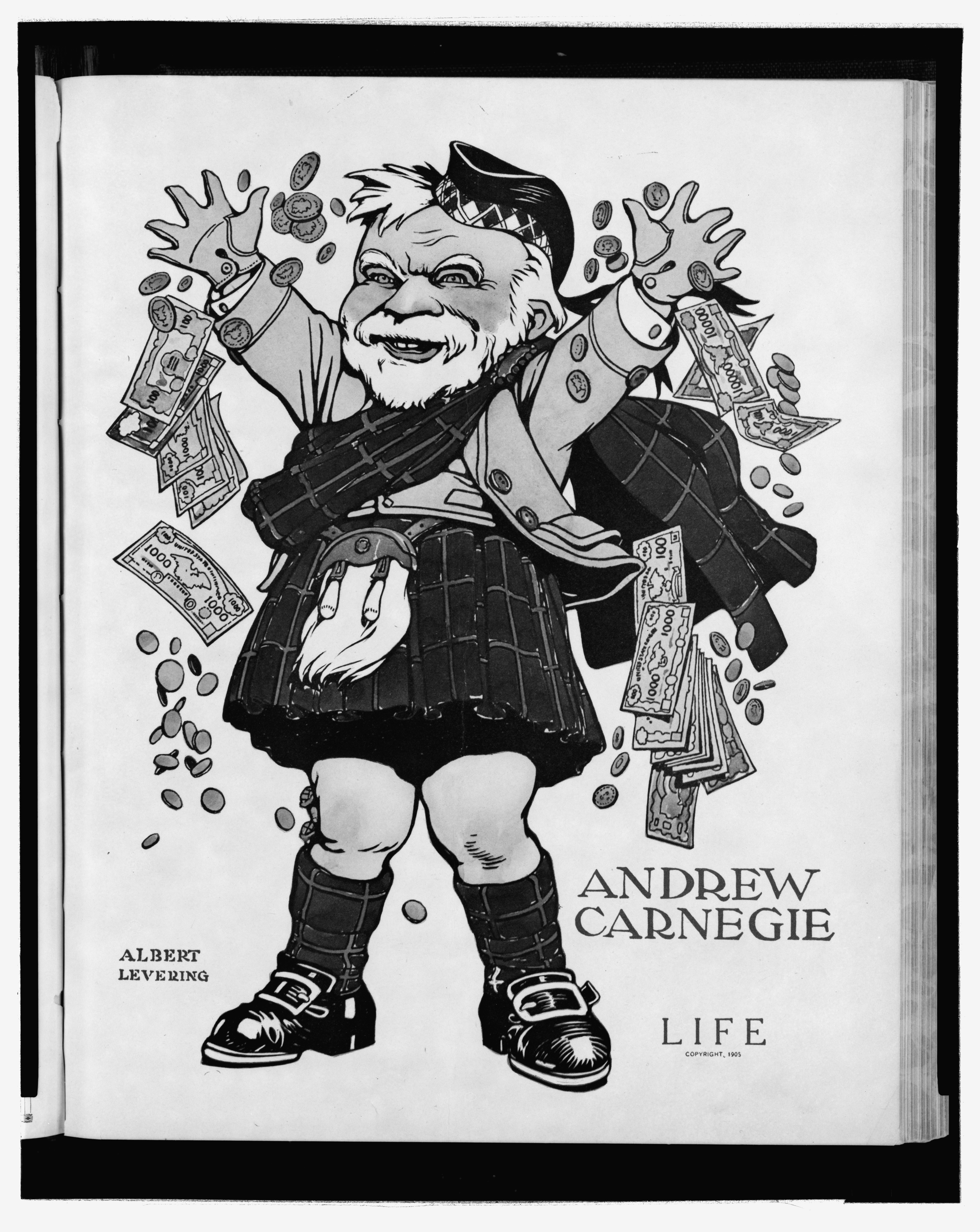
Cartoon depicting Andrew Carnegie throwing money in air, Life, 1905

According to biographer Burton J. Hendrick:

His benefactions amounted to $350,000,000—for he gave away not only his annual income of something more than $12,500,000, but most of the principal as well. Of this sum, $62,000,000 was allotted to the British Empire and $288,000,000 to the United States, for Carnegie, in the main, confined his benefactions to the English-speaking nations. His largest gifts were $125,000,000 to the Carnegie Corporation of New York (this same body also became his residuary legatee), $60,000,000 to public library buildings, $20,000,000 to colleges (usually the smaller ones), $6,000,000 to church organs, $29,000,000 to the Carnegie Foundation for the Advancement of Teaching, $22,000,000 to the Carnegie Institute of Pittsburgh, $22,000,000 to the Carnegie Institution of Washington, $10,000,000 to Hero Funds, $10,000,000 to the Endowment for International Peace, $10,000,000 to the Scottish Universities Trust, $10,000,000 to the United Kingdom Trust, and $3,750,000 to the Dunfermline Trust.

Hendrick argues that:

These gifts fairly picture Carnegie's conception of the best ways to improve the status of the common man. They represent all his personal tastes—his love of books, art, music, and nature—and the reforms which he regarded as most essential to human progress—scientific research, education both literary and technical, and, above all, the abolition of war. The expenditure the public most associates with Carnegie's name is that for public libraries. Carnegie himself frequently said that his favorite benefaction was the Hero Fund—among other reasons, because "it came up my ain back"; but probably deep in his own mind his library gifts took precedence over all others in importance. There was only one genuine remedy, he believed, for the ills that beset the human race, and that was enlightenment. "Let there be light" was the motto that, in the early days, he insisted on placing in all his library buildings. As to the greatest endowment of all, the Carnegie Corporation, that was merely Andrew Carnegie in permanently organized form; it was established to carry on, after Carnegie's death, the work to which he had given personal attention in his own lifetime.

=== Research sources ===
Carnegie's personal papers are at the Library of Congress Manuscript Division. The Carnegie Collections of the Columbia University Rare Book and Manuscript Library consist of the archives of the following organizations founded by Carnegie: The Carnegie Corporation of New York (CCNY); The Carnegie Endowment for International Peace (CEIP); the Carnegie Foundation for the Advancement of Teaching (CFAT);The Carnegie Council on Ethics and International Affairs (CCEIA). These collections deal primarily with Carnegie philanthropy and have very little personal material related to Carnegie. Carnegie Mellon University and the Carnegie Library of Pittsburgh jointly administer the Andrew Carnegie Collection of digitized archives on Carnegie's life.

=== Moral appraisal ===
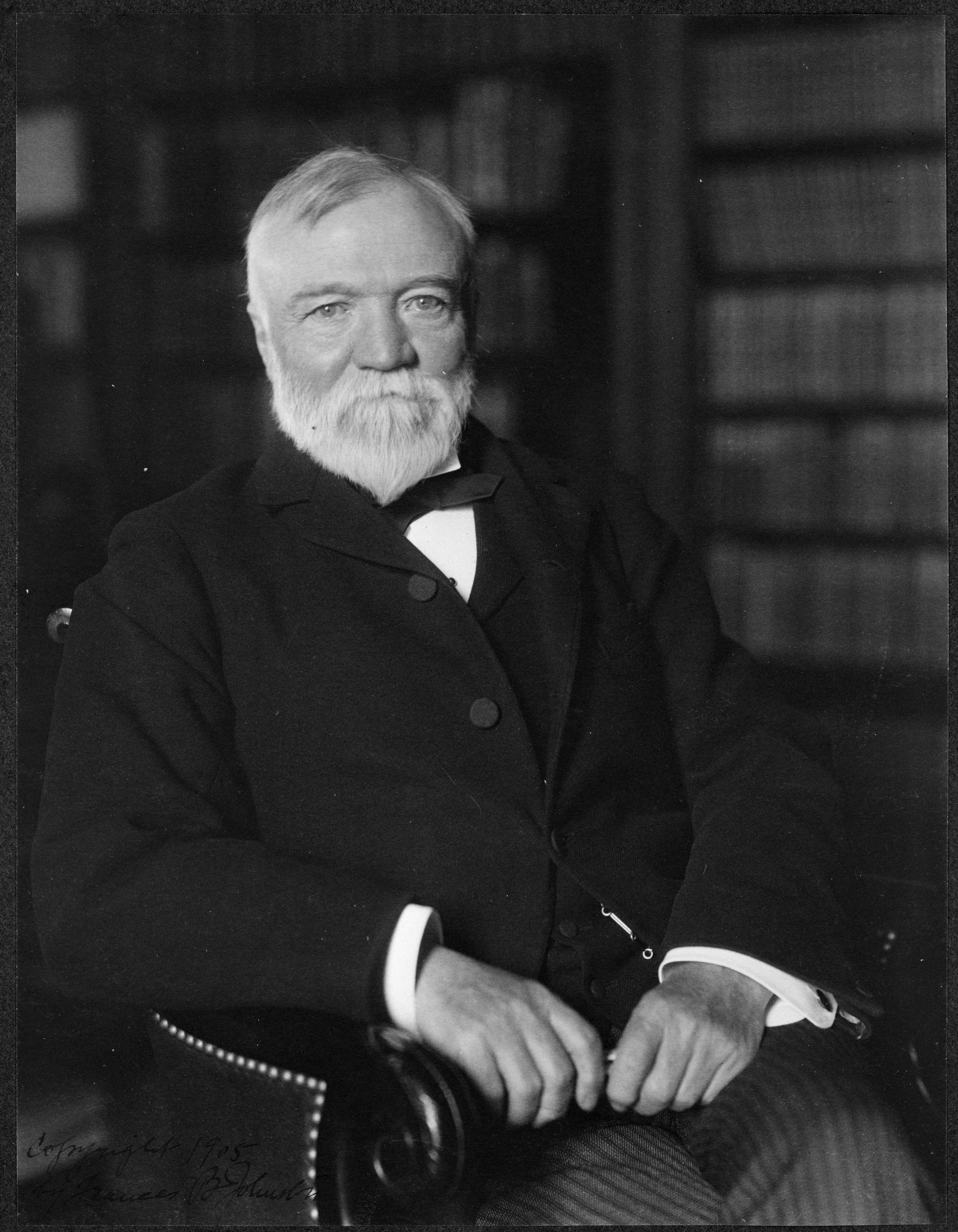
Carnegie, April 1905

By the standards of 19th-century tycoons, Carnegie was not a particularly ruthless man but a humanitarian with enough acquisitiveness to go in the ruthless pursuit of money. "Maybe with the giving away of his money," commented biographer Joseph Wall, "he would justify what he had done to get that money."

Historian Richard White makes a similar appraisal, writing that "In disposing of his wealth, Carnegie also sought to justify the existing social order."

Procuring such wealth reduced ordinary people to conditions of dependence and made life worse for the vast majority of Americans. Carnegie had two tasks. First, he had to justify these fortunes as the deserved rewards of those who ranked among Spencer's fit, and second, he had to show that they benefited society at large by providing a road to improvement and independence.

To some, Carnegie represents the idea of the American dream. He was an immigrant from Scotland who came to America and became successful. He is not only known for his successes but his huge amounts of philanthropic works, not only for charities but also to promote democracy and independence to colonized countries.

== In popular culture ==
- Carnegie's career is highlighted in the History Channel's miniseries docudrama The Men Who Built America.

== Works ==
Carnegie was a frequent contributor to periodicals on labor issues.

Books

- Our Coaching Trip, Brighton to Inverness (1882).
- An American Four-in-hand in Britain (1883).
- Round the World. New York: Charles Scribner's Sons (1884).
- An American Four-in-Hand in Britain. New York: Charles Scribner's Sons (1886).
- Triumphant Democracy, or, Fifty Years' March of the Republic. New York: Charles Scribner's Sons (1886).
- The Gospel of Wealth (1889).
- The Gospel of Wealth and Other Timely Essays. New York: The Century Co. (1901).
- The Empire of Business (1902).
  - Audiobook via LibriVox.
- The Secret of Business is the Management of Men (1903).
- James Watt (Famous Scots Series). New York: Doubleday, Page and Co. (1905).
- Problems of Today: Wealth–Labor–Socialism. New York: Doubleday, Page and Co. (1907).
- Autobiography of Andrew Carnegie (posthumous). Boston: Houghton Mifflin (1920).
  - Audiobook via Librivox.

Articles

- "Wealth". North American Review, vol. 148, no. 381 (Jun. 1889), pp. 653–64. Original version of The Gospel of Wealth.
- "The Bugaboo of Trusts". North American Review, vol. 148, no. 377 (February 1889).

Pamphlets

- The Bugaboo of Trusts. Reprinted from North American Review, vol. 148, no. 377 (February 1889).

Public speaking

- Industrial Peace: Address at the Annual Dinner of the National Civic Federation, New York City, December 15, 1904. [n.c.]: National Civic Federation (1904).
- Edwin M. Stanton: An Address by Andrew Carnegie on Stanton Memorial Day at Kenyon College. New York: Doubleday, Page and Co. (1906).
- The Negro in America: An Address Delivered Before the Philosophical Institution of Edinburg, October 16, 1907. Inverness: R. Carruthers & Sons, Courier Office (1907).
- Speech at the Annual Meeting of the Peace Society, at the Guildhall, London, EC, May 24, 1910. London: The Peace Society (1910).
- A League of Peace: A Rectorial Address Delivered to the Students in the University of St. Andrews, October 17, 1905. New York: New York Peace Society (1911).

Collected works

- Wall, Joseph Frazier, ed. The Andrew Carnegie Reader (1992).

== See also ==
- Carnegie (disambiguation)
- Commemoration of the American Civil War on postage stamps
- History of public library advocacy
- List of Carnegie libraries in the United States
- List of peace activists
- List of richest Americans in history
- List of colleges and universities named after people

== Notes ==
Academic offices
Preceded by James Stuart	Rector of the University of St Andrews; 1901–1907	Succeeded by The Lord Avebury
Preceded by Herbert Henry Asquith	Rector of the University of Aberdeen; 1911–1914	Succeeded by Winston Churchill
