= Engineering Societies' Building =

Commercial building in Manhattan, New York

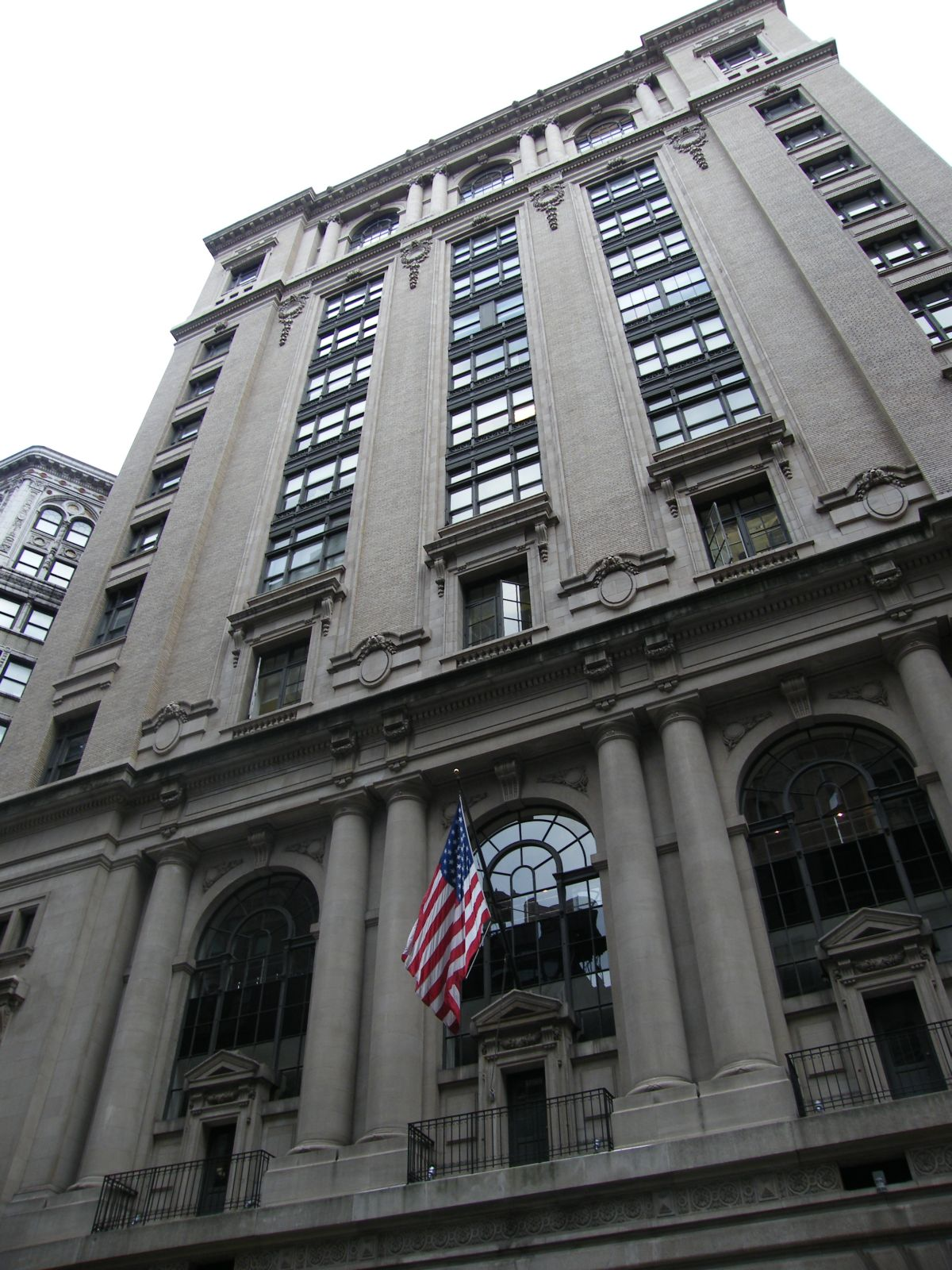
- Interactive map of the Engineering Societies' Building area

General information
- Architectural style: Neoclassical
- Location: 25–33 West 39th Street, Manhattan, New York, US
- Coordinates: 40°45′09″N 73°59′02″W
- Opened: 1907
- Renovated: 1963
- Client: American Society of Mechanical Engineers, American Institute of Mining Engineers, American Institute of Electrical Engineers (original tenants)
- Landlord: Thor Equities

Technical details
- Floor count: 16

Design and construction
- Architects: Hale & Morse

Renovating team
- Architects: Wechsler & Schimenti

U.S. National Register of Historic Places
- Designated: August 30, 2007
- Reference no.: 07000867
- Designated entity: Engineering Societies' Building and Engineers' Club

New York State Register of Historic Places
- Designated: July 13, 2007
- Reference no.: 06101.016130
- Designated entity: Engineering Societies' Building

The Engineering Societies' Building, also known as 25 West 39th Street, is a commercial building at 25–33 West 39th Street in the Midtown Manhattan neighborhood of New York City. Located one block south of Bryant Park, it was constructed in 1907 along with the adjoining Engineers' Club. The building was designed by Herbert D. Hale, of the firm Hale & Rogers, along with Henry G. Morse, in the neo-Renaissance style. It served as the clubhouse of the United Engineering Societies, composed of its three founding societies: the American Society of Mechanical Engineers (ASME), the American Institute of Mining Engineers (AIME), and the American Institute of Electrical Engineers (AIEE). The American Society of Civil Engineers (ASCE) joined the partnership in 1917.

The Engineering Societies Building's facade is divided horizontally into three sections. The building was originally thirteen stories tall, excluding the second story, which was not visible from the facade. The lowest three stories comprise a rusticated base of limestone, including a colonnade with Doric columns. Above that is a seven-story stone midsection, followed by another loggia similar to that on the base. Inside, the building's first story contains the lobby. The second story is hidden beneath what was originally a double-tiered auditorium with 1,000 seats. The fifth and sixth stories contained several lecture rooms, and the seventh through eleventh stories contained engineering offices; the twelfth and thirteenth stories were devoted to an engineering library. Two stories were added later.

The Engineering Societies' Building was funded by Andrew Carnegie, who in 1904 offered money for a new clubhouse for New York City's various engineering societies. The Engineers' Club did not want to share a building with the other societies, so an architectural design competition was held for two clubhouse buildings. By the 1950s, the Engineering Societies' Building was becoming too small for the engineering societies' needs, and the societies sold the clubhouse in 1960. In the late 20th century, the building was used by fashion firms such as women's clothing retailer Lane Bryant and fashion designer Tommy Hilfiger. The building has been owned by Thor Equities since 2005, and it was added to the National Register of Historic Places in 2007.

== Site ==
The Engineering Societies' Building is at 25–33 West 39th Street in the Midtown Manhattan neighborhood of New York City. The building occupies a rectangular land lot with a frontage of 125 ft (38 m) along 39th Street, a depth of 98.75 ft (30.10 m), and an area of 12,343 ft^{2} (1,146.7 m^{2}). The building was once connected to the Engineers' Club Building to the north.

The Engineering Societies' Building is on 39th Street, one block south of Bryant Park, between Fifth and Sixth Avenues. On the same block are The Bryant and 452 Fifth Avenue to the east; the Haskins & Sells Building to the west; and the American Radiator Building and Bryant Park Studios to the northwest. Other nearby places include the New York Public Library Main Branch one block to the north, as well as the Lord & Taylor Building to the southeast. The Engineering Societies and Engineers' Club buildings collectively served as a center for the engineering industry in the United States during the early and mid-20th century. The adjoining area included the offices of three engineering publications on 39th Street, as well as Engineers' Club member Nikola Tesla's laboratory on 8 West 40th Street.

== Architecture ==
The Engineering Societies' Building was designed by Herbert D. Hale, of the firm Hale & Rogers, along with Henry G. Morse in the neo-Renaissance style. It was constructed as a shared clubhouse for the American Society of Mechanical Engineers (ASME), American Institute of Mining Engineers (AIME), and American Institute of Electrical Engineers (AIEE). The main requirement was that the interior had to include space for the three founding societies. The building was originally thirteen and a half stories tall with a height of 218.54 ft (67 m). Two additional stories are set back from the street; they were added in 1916.

The building measures 115 by 90 ft (35 by 27 m), since New York City building codes of the time required that only 85 percent of a land lot's area be occupied. The industrialist Andrew Carnegie, who financed the building's construction, owned a private residence at 23 West 39th Street, thus preserving views from the east. A driveway surrounded the building, connecting to the passenger and freight elevators, as well as the shipping and receiving offices. Vehicles could enter the driveway through a covered arch on the eastern side of the building, drop off passengers, and exit through the western side. Wrought-iron gates were placed in front of the driveway. The eastern driveway entrance was replaced in 1913 by a six-story building on 23 West 39th Street, while the western entrance still exists and contains a service gate. Under a deed restriction, the adjoining building to the east was restricted to a height of 60 ft (18 m).

=== Facade ===
The facade had decorations on all four sides because it was designed to be set back from adjoining structures. The facade is built of limestone up to the third story auditorium, above which it is gray mottled brick and terracotta. The facade was meant to indicate the interior uses: the lower section contained auditoriums, the middle section contained offices, and the upper part contained the library. The facade's principal elevation faces south on 39th Street. It is five bays wide and is organized into three horizontal sections: a base, shaft, and capital. The eastern elevation is designed in a similar arrangement, while the western elevation is made of plain brick. The adjacent structure at 23 West 39th Street, designed for the Engineers' Club, has a storefront and a five-story, two-bay-wide brick facade.

==== Base ====
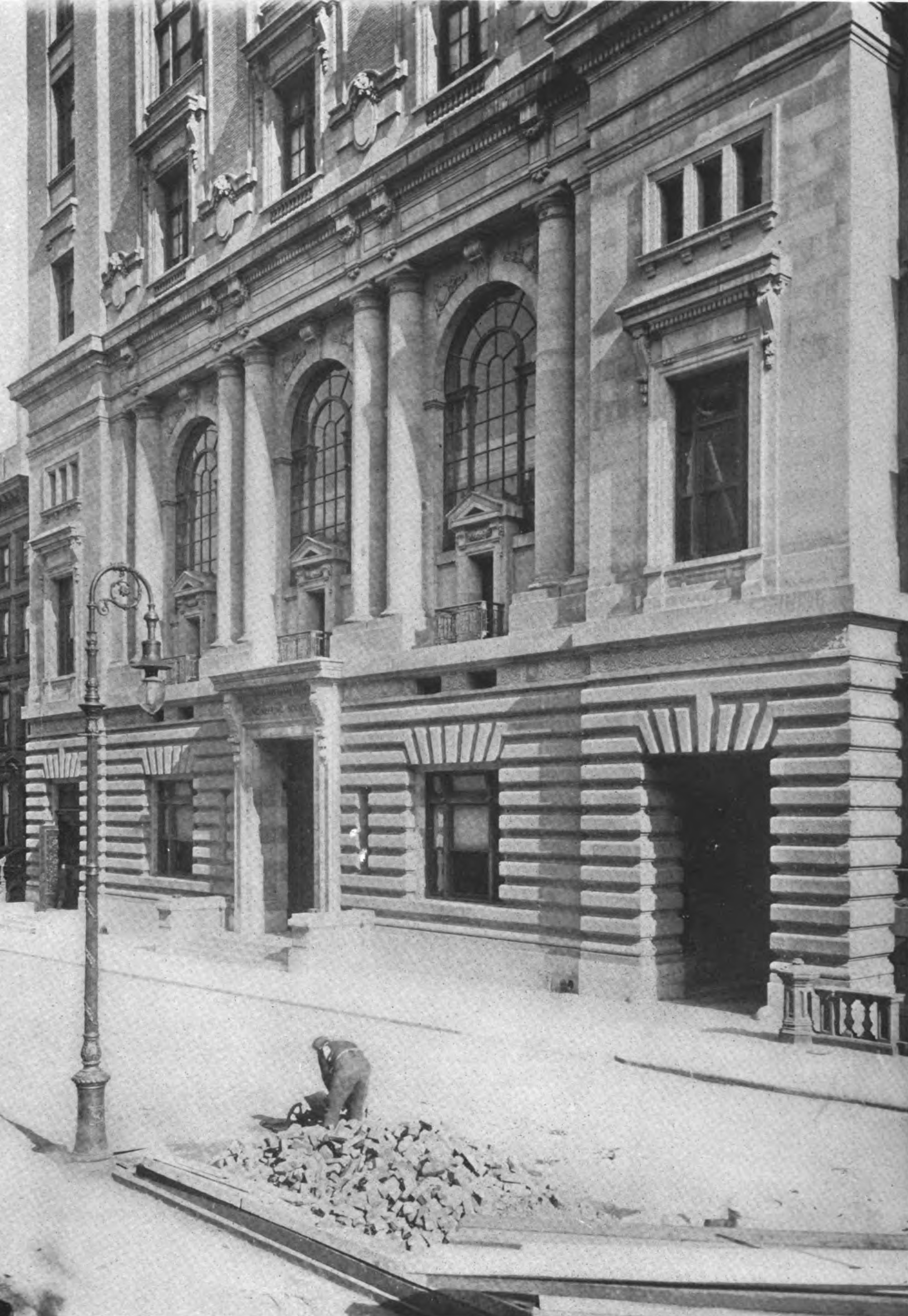
View of the base showing the original arrangement of the first through third stories

The base is three stories high. The ground story is made of rusticated blocks of limestone above a water table made of stone. The middle three bays are slightly recessed from the outer bays, and a frieze runs above the ground story. There are five openings, each topped by voussoirs and a tall keystone. The westernmost opening serves as the current entrance to the building, and the center opening is a garage door; the other three openings are square-headed windows. A bronze plaque with the words "Engineering Societies" was hung above the original main entrance. Because the auditorium inside had a sloped floor, the second story was designed as a partial story and is not visible from the facade.

On the third and fourth stories, the three center bays contain double-height arches. Each arch has a balcony and an aedicular stone doorway, topped by a triangular pediment with a frieze and console brackets. The rest of each arch contains a glass-and-iron frame, as well as a console bracket above the center and carved fronds at the corner spandrels. The three arches are separated from each other by pairs of Doric-style columns, while the outer arches are flanked by a Doric column and a pilaster. Above the columns and pilasters are an entablature, which includes brackets with carved wreaths and dentils directly above each of the columns. A cornice with dentils projects above the fourth story. The outer bays each contain a tall aedicular window with a paneled sill. Above each aedicular window is a cornice and a wide tripartite window.

==== Shaft ====
The fifth through eleventh stories constitute the building's shaft, or midsection. As with the base, the three middle bays are slightly recessed and the outer bays are designed as projecting pavilions. The fifth story is designed as a transitional story. Within each of the middle bays is a balustrade, an aedicular window, and a cornice with console brackets. There are stone roundels flanking each of the fifth-story windows, above which is carving of a lion's head with a swag in its mouth. The outer bays of the fifth story are plain rectangular windows with shallow stone cornices.

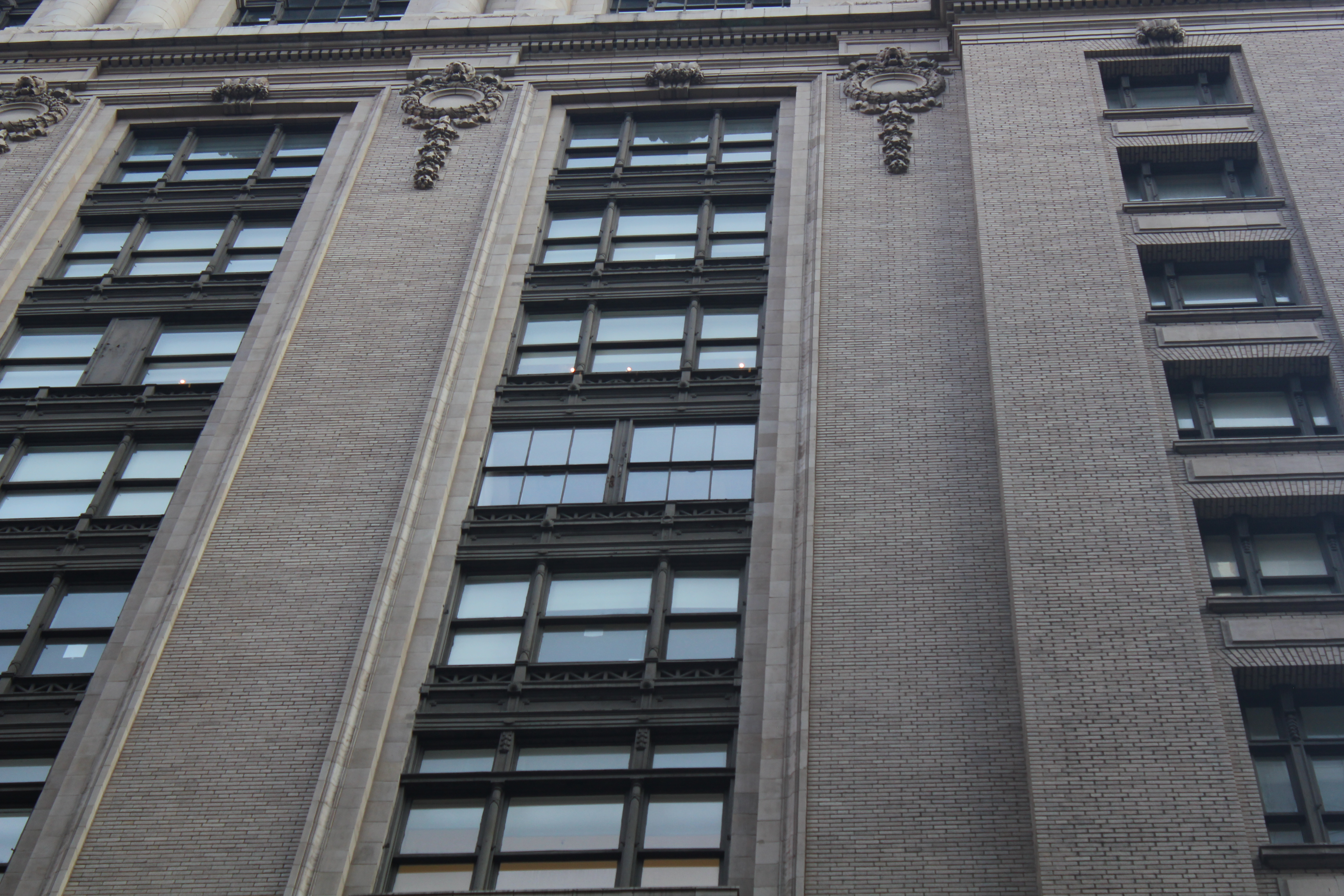
Detail of windows in the shaft

On the sixth through eleventh stories, the center three bays each contain a six-story-high opening. Each of the openings contains iron bars, which divide the windows into section. Additionally, spandrel panels separate the different stories. At the eleventh floor, there is a bracket above each of the middle bays, and the windows are flanked by carvings, which depict a roundel, a lion's head, and a wreath dangling from the lion's mouth. Within the outer bays, each of the sixth through eleventh stories contains a rectangular window with a sill at the bottom and a stone panel at the top. Each of the outer bays' windows contains a brick surround, as well as iron bars that divide the window openings into nine panes.

==== Capital ====
The top of the building contains a loggia similar to that at the base. The loggia consists of double-height arches, which are each flanked by columns. The outer bays each contain wide tripartite windows. Above the loggia is an architrave. There is a cornice above the thirteenth story, containing a cornice with dentils and lions' heads. The two top stories, added to the roof in 1916, are set back from the street wall. They contain square-headed window openings and a brick cladding.

=== Structural features ===
The steel used in the building construction weighs a total of 2,650 short tons (2,370 long tons; 2,400 t). The foundation consists of 46 piers descending to the underlying layer of rock, which ranges between 27 and 67 ft (8.2 and 20.4 m) below the curb. Two of these piers each carry a live load of 1,500 short tons (1,300 long tons; 1,400 t) and contain steel columns weighing 1,000 psf (48 kPa).

The double-height auditorium at the third story was spanned by girders measuring 60 ft (18 m) wide. The ceiling was supported by three plate girders and a 60-short-ton (54-long-ton; 54 t) lattice girder. The steel plate-girders in the ceilings of the main auditorium weigh 48 short tons (43 long tons; 44 t) tons each, while the steel lattice truss on the sixth floor weighs 64 short tons (57 long tons; 58 t). All the steel work in the building is covered with 2 to 4 in (51 to 102 mm) of semi-porous terracotta, and the columns are grouted with concrete. The floors are built with 6-inch-long (150 mm) segmental arches of terracotta, above which is a 5-inch-long (130 mm) layer of cinder-concrete. All exterior walls are furred with a 2 in long (51 mm) terra-cotta block to prevent moisture from being driven through the walls. The fourteenth to sixteenth stories are supported by four columns resting directly on the underlying layer of bedrock.

=== Interior ===
The building has 208,000 ft^{2} (19,300 m^{2}) of interior space. There were three passenger elevators, surrounded by an iron grille lined with wire glass. On each side of the elevator core, wide stairways rose to the sixth floor, above which a stair led to the library. A freight elevator was installed on the eastern side of the building, while a service stairway on the north side connected all stories. The basement had a boiler room, engine room, and coal storage areas, but it obtained electricity light and power from the city's electrical grid. There were three boilers for heating, as well as four blowers in the basement for ventilating. Low-pressure steam was provided twenty-four hours a day, year-round, by radiators below each window. The ventilation system could be toggled for each room, and the blowers from the basement pushed air to the roof, where it was exhausted by four fans.

The designers minimized the usage of woodwork in the building; where wood was used, it was designed to be fireproof. The large window sashes were built of cast-iron, while other windows were built with wood covered with iron. Additionally, iron doors were used at the lower stories. The ninth-story door leading to the Engineers' Club was made of copper on wood. All finished floors throughout the building were of cement, marble, or terrazzo, except the library. main auditorium, and lecture rooms, where maple was used. There was also an 8,000 US gal (30,000 L) water tower on the roof, fed by two electric pumps, as well as a standpipe at either end of the building.

==== First and second stories ====
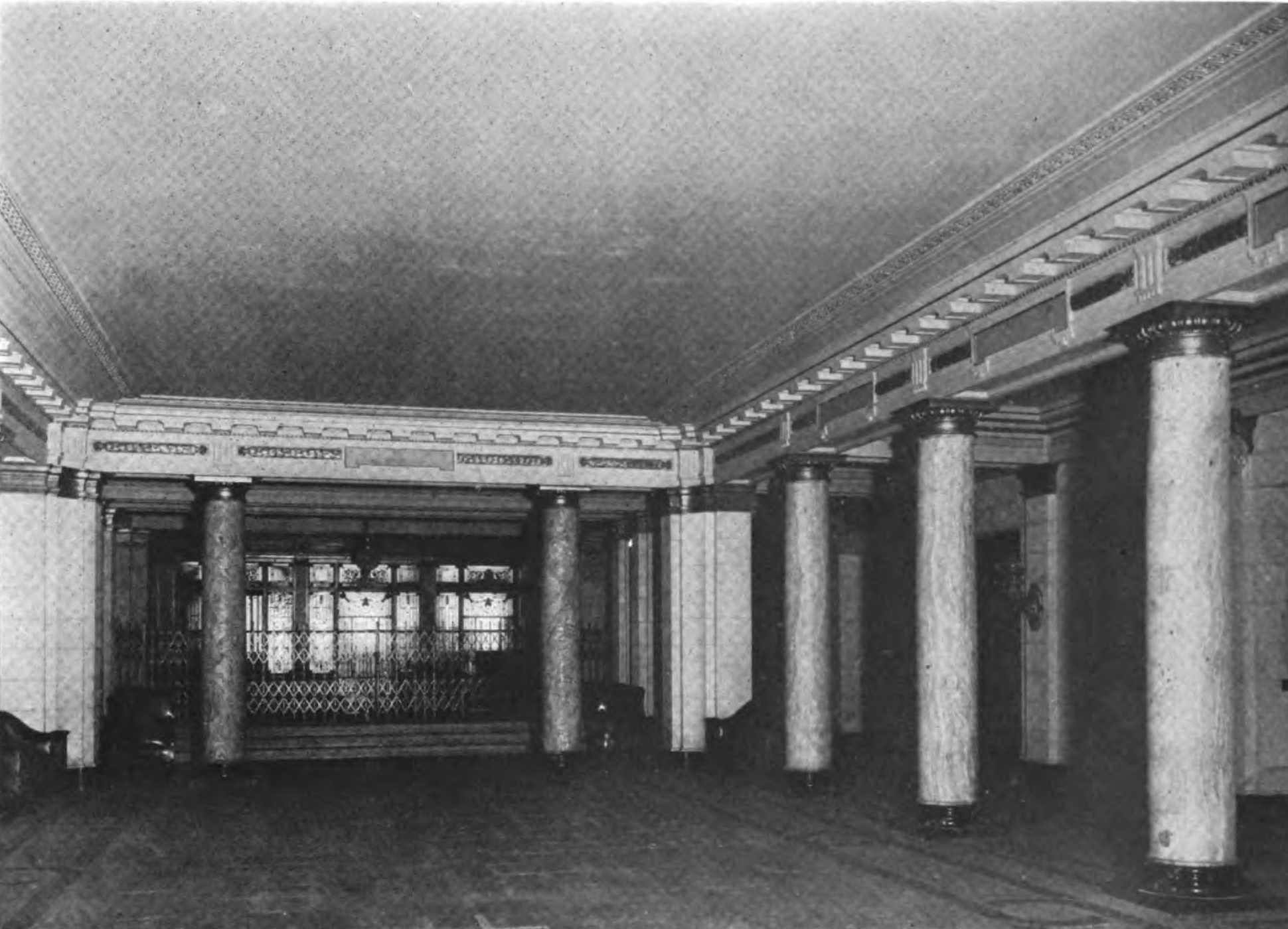
Foyer as depicted in American Architect and Building News (1907)

The floor surface of the first story is made of Tennessee marble tiles surrounded by a colored-marble border. The main foyer had twelve large columns of Swiss Cipolin marble. A small flight of steps led from the foyer to the elevators. Gold decoration was also used in the foyer, and individual lamps were placed in recesses on the foyer ceiling. On the foyer walls, facing toward the main entrance, were two large bronze tablets. One tablet had a relief portrait of Carnegie and the words of his short letter, in which he gifted $1.5 million to the construction of the Engineering Societies' and Engineers' Club buildings. The other tablet had a statement saying that the land was given by members and friends of the three founding societies: the ASME, AIME, and AIEE. The foyer has since been converted into a garage.

At the rear of the first floor were receiving and shipping offices, through which all freight and goods were handled. The offices contained an information bureau and a telephone and telegraph service. The elevators and a main staircase were also grouped on one end of the hall. The entrance vestibule contains two small flights of steps to the elevator lobby. A set of stairs at the rear of the elevator lobby connected with a glass door. This glass door led to a 10 ft-wide (3.0 m) courtyard, across which was the entrance to the Engineers' Club. The main staircase led directly to the third-story auditorium. This staircase has a decorative metal railing, as well as a niche at the first story, which is flanked by piers and topped by an entablature.

The second story was directly below the raked floor of the auditorium. Bathrooms were placed on the second story, occupying most of the space that would otherwise have been left vacant due to the auditorium's raked floor. There was also a coatroom, arranged in several rows. An "assembly and smoking room for informal meetings", a catering room, and exhibit space was also provided.

==== Auditorium ====
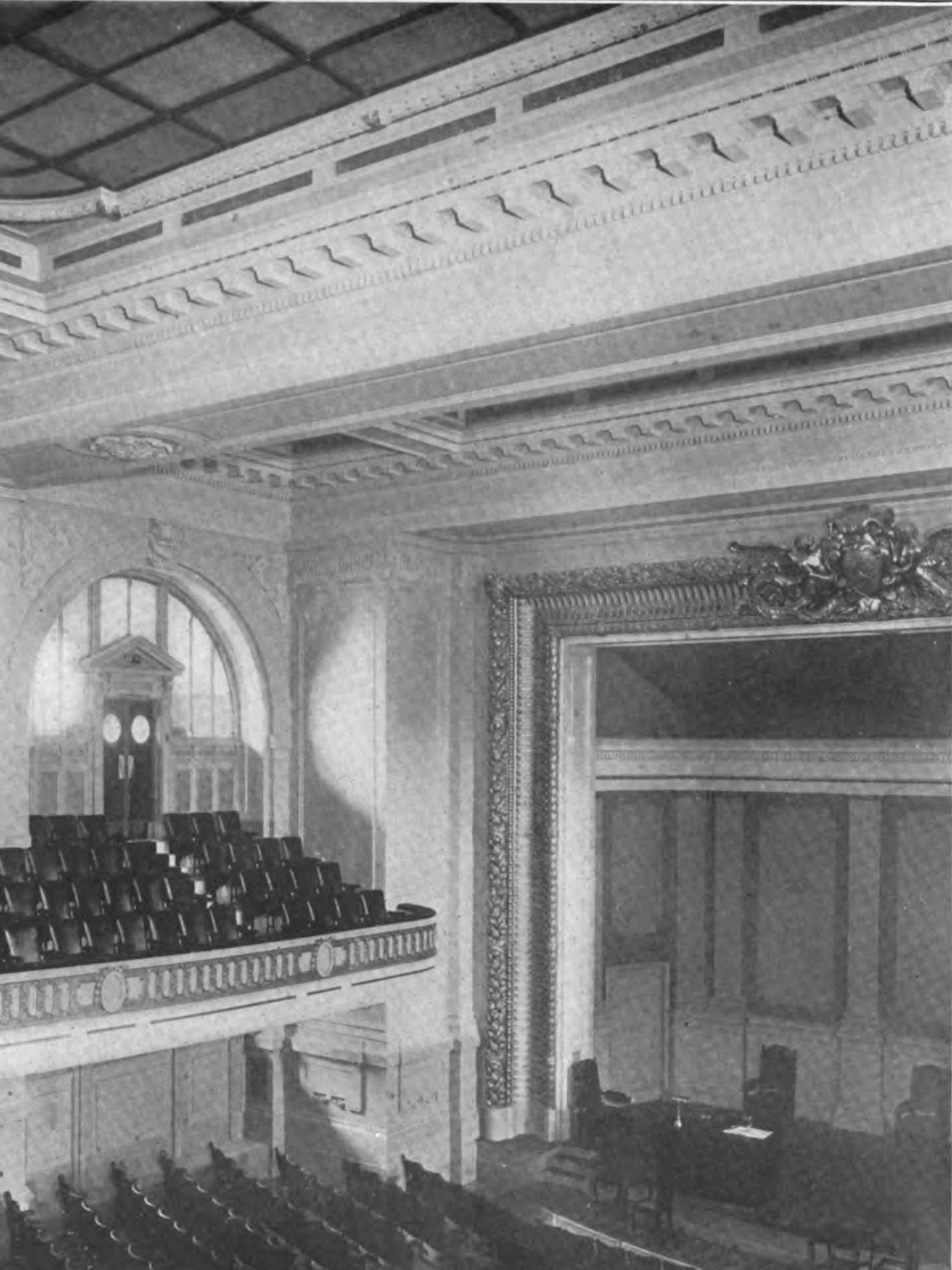
Auditorium as depicted in American Architect and Building News (1907)

The third and fourth stories contained a 1,000-seat auditorium, which was designed to accommodate each of the engineering societies' meetings. There was a parterre level and a gallery level above it, which contained red-leather chairs. The auditorium was designed around a small speaking platform, rather than around a large stage, so all audience members could easily see the speaker at all times. The front of the gallery was bordered in red plush, and the proscenium arch contained a decorative cartouche with the badges of the three founding societies. There were side brackets for lighting, but the auditorium was primarily lit by incandescent lamps above a glass ceiling. The ceiling was placed about 15 in (380 mm) below the fifth-floor slab, and the lamps were installed in the intermediate space. The acoustic properties of the space were described in a contemporary media source as "remarkably good".

The speakers' platform had anterooms and a connection to the freight elevator. On both the parterre and the gallery floors, corridors surrounded the auditorium, allowing audience members to easily access the auditorium and providing a space for conversation. Four stairs, one from each corner of the auditorium, provided emergency exits. The stairs and elevators opened directly onto the two floors of the auditorium so it could be evacuated quickly in case of emergency. The third and fourth stories have since been converted to regular office floors; they are placed behind the arches on 39th Street.

==== Upper stories ====
An initial plan in The New York Times had the library on the fifth floor, the founding societies' offices on the sixth to eighth floors, and rental space on four subsequent floors. As built, the fifth and sixth stories contained several lecture rooms. On the fifth floor, there were two large assembly rooms, which could be used either independently or in tandem. There were also two smaller rooms on this floor. (Note: The larger rooms measured 51 ft × 66 ft (16 m × 20 m) and 29 ft × 66 ft (8.8 m × 20.1 m), while the smaller rooms measured 16 ft × 22 ft (4.9 m × 6.7 m) and 18 ft × 19 ft (5.5 m × 5.8 m).) The smaller rooms could be used either on their own or as an auxiliary space for either of the larger rooms. The sixth floor had smaller assembly rooms, (Note: Respectively measuring 22 ft × 44.5 ft (6.7 m × 13.6 m); 30 ft × 46.5 ft (9.1 m × 14.2 m); 30 ft × 41 ft (9.1 m × 12.5 m); and 20 ft × 28 ft (6.1 m × 8.5 m)) which could be used for small gatherings. Cove lighting was used in the assembly rooms. Some of the original decorative details remain in the fifth floor's large assembly rooms, such as moldings, wall paneling, and ceilings. On the south wall, where the windows overlook 39th Street, there are also paired piers.

The seventh and eighth floors were reserved for "associate" societies that dealt primarily in science or engineering, such as the Society of Naval Architects and Marine Engineers and the National Electric Light Association. These tenants could also use the auditorium. Each of the ninth through eleventh floors were devoted to the offices of the founding societies: AIME to the ninth, AIEE to the tenth, and ASME to the eleventh. Outside the elevators on these stories was a terrazzo floor with a plaque corresponding to the society that occupied that story. These floors were all devoted to administrative and executive work, and they were arranged in different layouts for each society. The ninth story had a footbridge, which connected to the tenth story of the Engineers' Club Building.

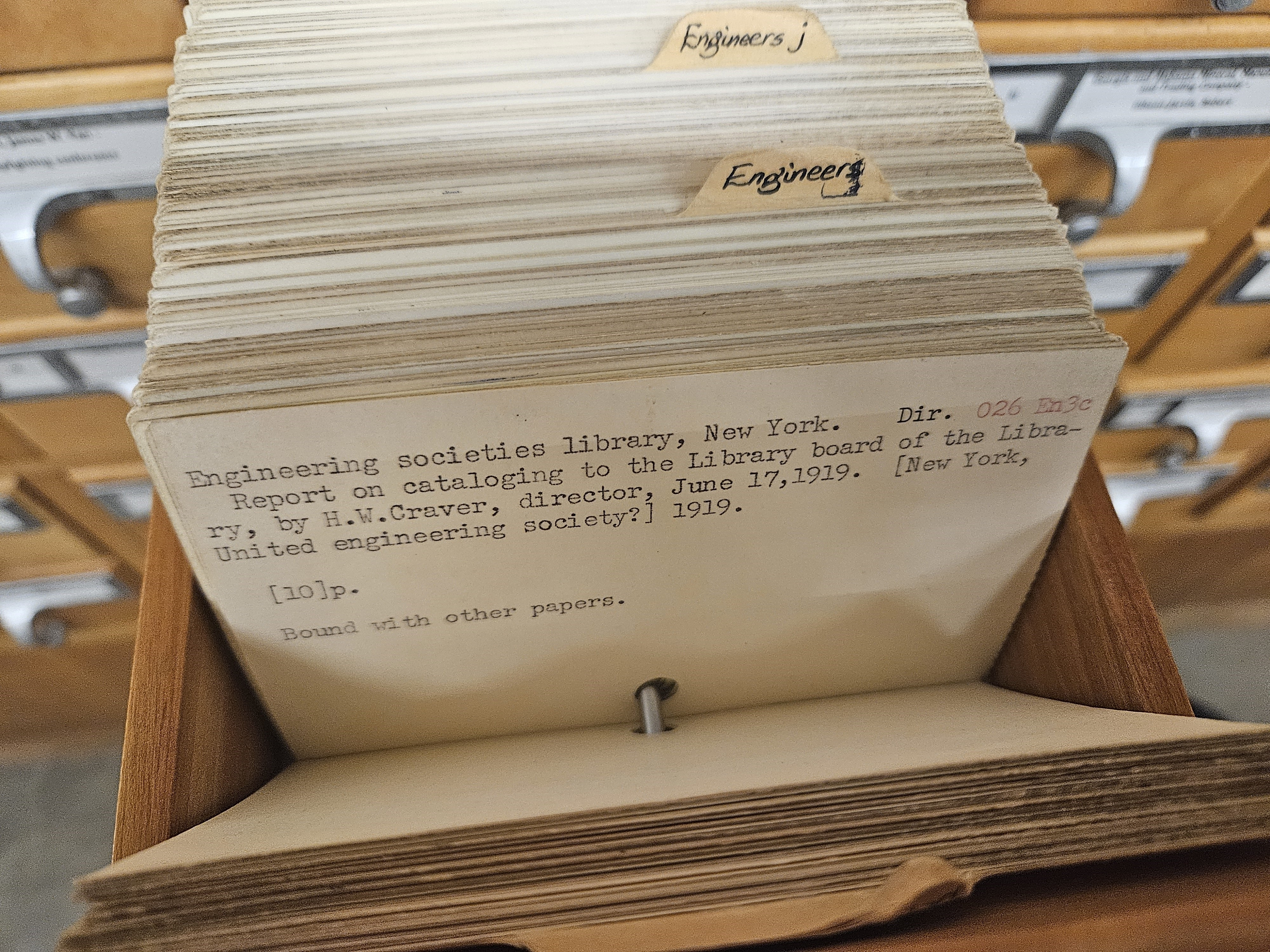
The original Engineering Societies Library card catalog, along with most of the collection, is now held by the Linda Hall Library in Kansas City.

The twelfth and thirteenth floors were used as the libraries of the three founding societies and for other engineering collections. The twelfth floor contained the stacks, while the thirteenth floor had a reading room with stacks, a delivery desk, reading tables, and chairs. Additionally, space was reserved for working alcoves and activities such as photographic reproduction and drawing. Media of the time described the library as being "retired, quiet, free from noise and dust, [and] open at all times to any reader". The eastern end of the reading room, facing the elevators, had a bronze bust of Andrew Carnegie, carved by Mrs. E. Cadwalader Guild. The twelfth and thirteenth stories contain some original moldings but have been largely redesigned.

The fourteenth and fifteenth stories have always been used as office space. The fourteenth story has a mezzanine. When fashion designer Tommy Hilfiger used the building as a showroom, there was a grand suite on the sixteenth floor, with three private bathrooms, a kitchen, and a dining room.

== History ==
The first proposal for what would become the Engineering Societies Building occurred in 1895, when American Institute of Electrical Engineers (AIEE) member W. D. Weaver asked businessman Andrew Carnegie to fund a building for the shared use of several societies. This plan did not pass. On February 9, 1903, Carnegie attended a dinner for the AIEE's library, where the institute's president talked about the need for a shared engineering societies' clubhouse. Carnegie then talked with AIEE president Charles F. Scott and board chairman Calvin W. Rice over the idea of a new clubhouse. Five days after that dinner, Carnegie agreed to donate $1 million for the erection of such a building.

=== Development ===
==== Planning ====
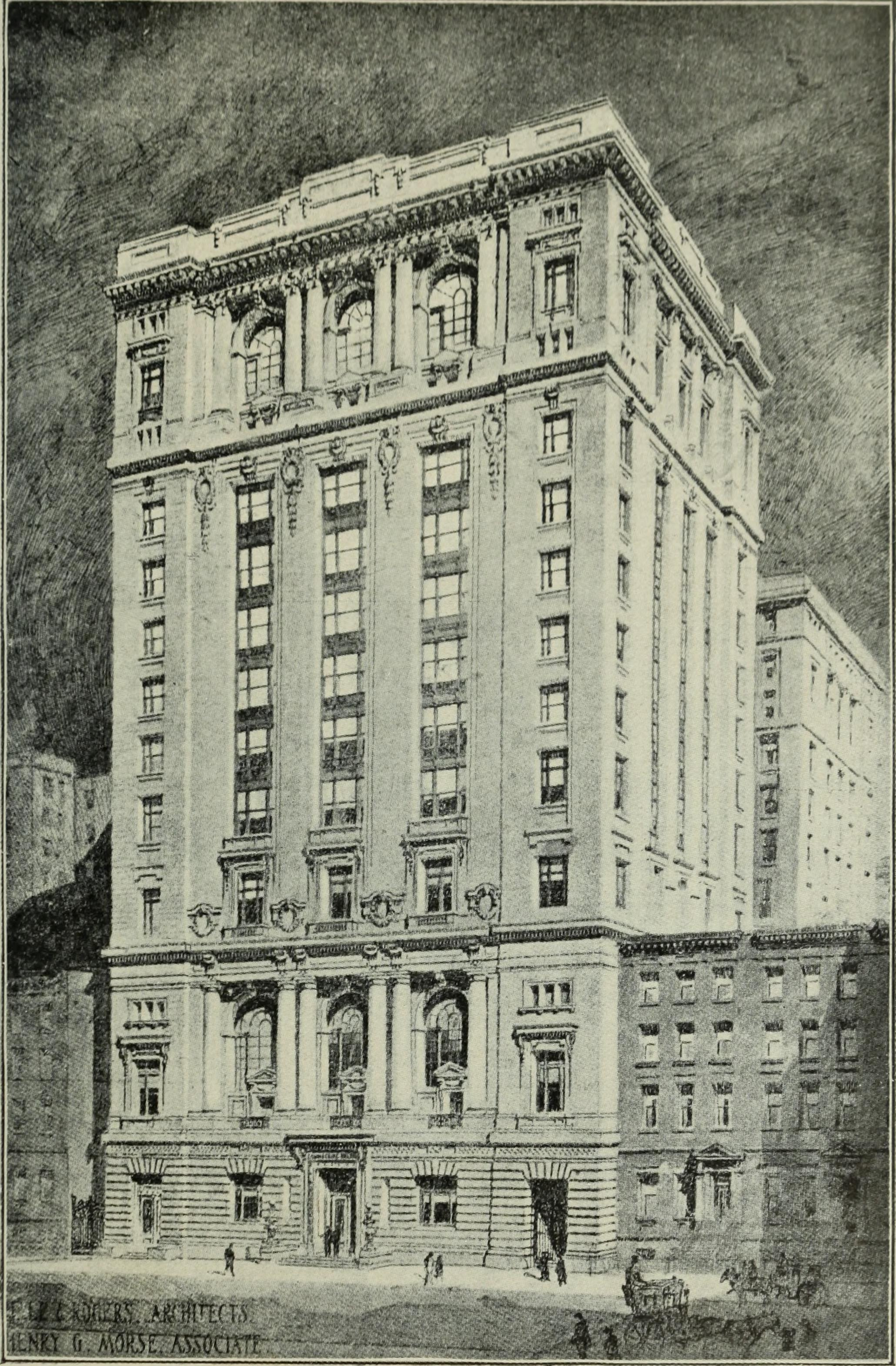
Drawing of the building in The Iron and Steel magazine

Carnegie acquired five land lots on 39th Street, measuring 125 by 100 ft (38 by 30 m), in May 1903. Carnegie had acquired these lots specifically because they were directly behind the Engineers' Club. Carnegie offered to donate $1 million (about $27.9 million in 2024) to fund the construction of a clubhouse for several engineering societies on that site. The engineering building would house the ASME, AIME, and AIEE. The ASCE had also been invited to join the Engineering Societies Building but declined, preferring to stay at its clubhouse at 220 West 57th Street. Originally, the Engineers' Club was to occupy space in the engineering building. However, this was deemed logistically prohibitive, so two buildings connected at their rears were developed.

In March 1904, Carnegie increased his gift to $1.5 million (about $40.8 million in 2024). The gift was to be shared by both the club and the societies, with $450,000 for the Engineers' Club and $1,050,000 for the engineering societies. Carnegie's gift only covered the costs of the respective buildings, and the club and societies had to buy their own respective land lots. The engineering societies' site cost $517,000. The New York Times wrote of the sites: "The location agreed upon is probably the best which could be found on the American continent. For the next quarter of a century at least it will be close to the business centre of New York."

==== Design and construction ====
After Carnegie's gift, the ASME, AIME, AIEE, and Engineers' Club formed a Conference Committee to plan the new buildings. Because of Carnegie's international fame and his large gift, the design process was to be "a semi-public matter of more than ordinary importance", as a 1907 article described it. The Conference Committee launched an architectural design competition in April 1904, giving $1,000 each (about $27,947 in 2024) to six longstanding architecture firms who submitted plans. (Note: These firms were Ackerman & Partridge, Carrère and Hastings, Clinton and Russell, Lord and Hewlett, Palmer & Hornbostel, and Whitfield & King.) Other architects were allowed to submit plans anonymously and without compensation. Any architect was eligible if they had actually practiced architecture under their real name for at least two years. The four best plans from non-invited architects would receive a monetary prize. (Note: The compensation has variously been cited as $200 or $400 per runner-up prize.) William Robert Ware was hired to judge the competition.

That July, the committee examined over 500 drawings submitted for the two sites. (Note: The number of submissions has been cited as 26 or 28.) Hale & Rogers and Henry G. Morse, who had not been formally invited, were hired to design the Engineering Societies' Building. Herbert D. Hale of Hale & Rogers was the grandson of the preacher Edward Everett Hale. Henry D. Whitfield and Beverly King, a relatively obscure firm that had nonetheless been formally invited, won the commission for the Engineers' Club Building. Nepotism may have been a factor in the Engineers' Club commission, as Carnegie was married to Whitfield's sister Louise. Hale and Morse received one of the four prizes for non-invited architects; the others were Trowbridge & Livingston, Frank C. Roberts & Co. with Edgar V. Seeler, and Allen & Collens.

The United Engineering Society, which represented the ASME, AIME, and AIEE, took title to the main land lot between 25 and 33 West 39th Street in December 1904. An additional land lot at 23 West 39th Street was acquired the next April. By July 1905, construction had not yet started because Hale & Rogers considered all bids for the construction contract to be too expensive. That December, the United Engineering Society prepared a set of five criteria. The new building had to contain offices for the three societies, an auditorium, a library, space for other engineering societies, and a driveway. By the following month, the building was under construction and had reached the fourth floor. Andrew and Louise Carnegie laid the cornerstone, a box containing various mementos, at a simple ceremony on May 8, 1906.

=== Society house ===
The Engineering Societies' Building was dedicated on April 16 to 19, 1907. At the official opening on April 16, U.S. president Theodore Roosevelt sent a congratulatory letter to the United Engineering Societies, and the societies thanked Carnegie for his gift. The next day, April 17, the presidents of each society gave speeches and medals were given to society members. The ASME, AIEE, and AIME hosted their first events over the next two days.

==== 1900s to 1940s ====
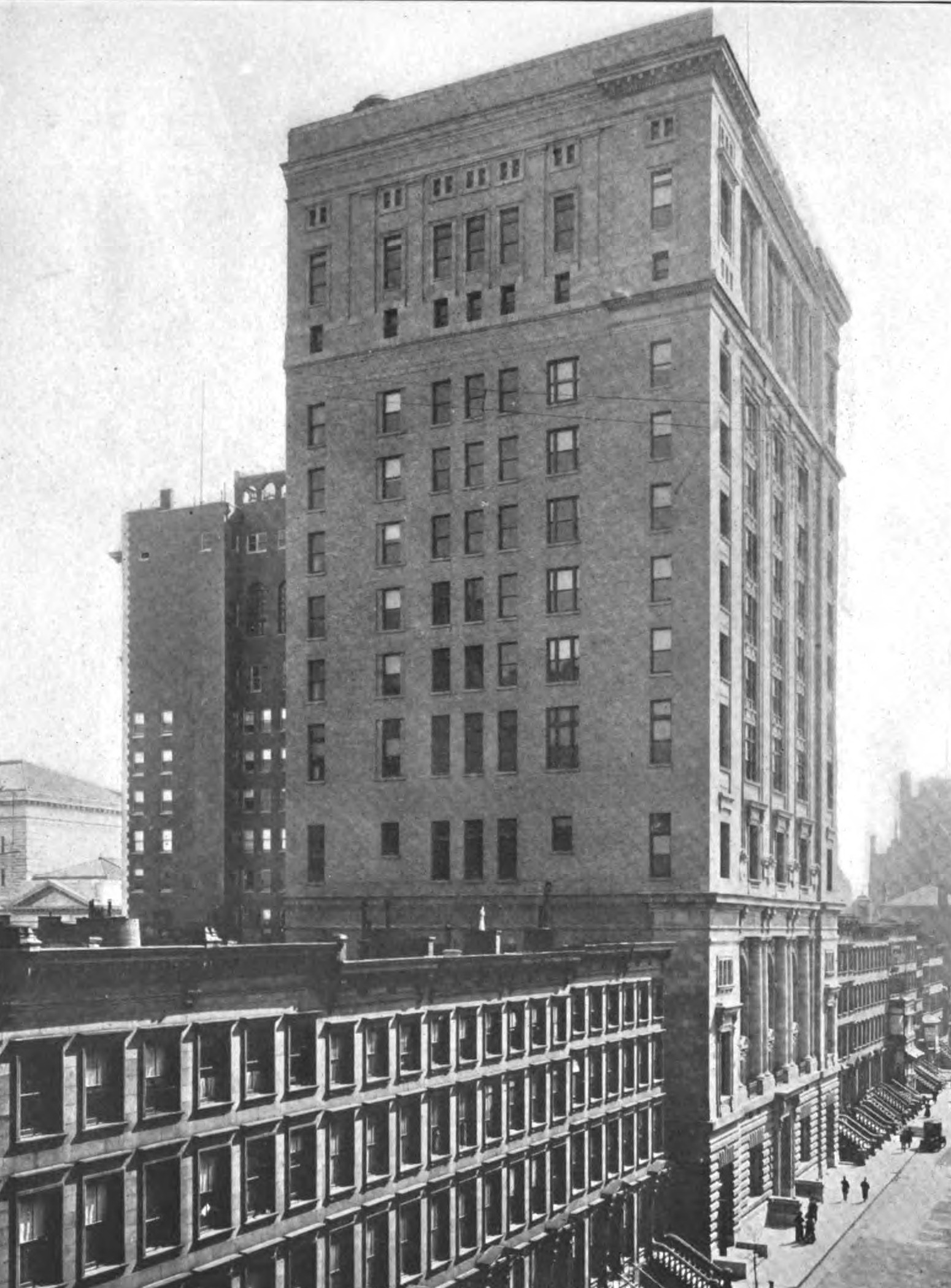
View from southwest in 1907

The Engineering Societies' Building and the Engineers' Club Building quickly became part of an engineering hub in Midtown Manhattan, with both national and international conferences being held there. One of the earliest events at the building was a 1908 speech by U.S. Army general George Owen Squier, who predicted that aerial warfare would not be successful, as well as a 1911 speech by astronomer Percival Lowell, who spoke of life on Mars. Among the other events in the building was a conference for an international association for testing materials, described as "the most important of its kind ever called together", and a large stamp exhibition in 1913. Several awards were also granted there, including the AIEE's annual Edison Gold Medal, as well as the Verein Deutscher Ingenieure's 1913 Grashof Medal, given to George Westinghouse. The Engineering Foundation was established at the building in 1915, and a "Museum of Safety and Sanitation" was housed there as well.

In 1913, Beverly Sedgwick King designed a six-story annex to the Engineers' Club on the adjacent lot at 23 West 39th Street. The annex, completed in 1915, replaced the carriage entrance of the Engineering Societies' Building. The United Engineering Societies agreed to let the Engineers' Club use the eastern wall of the Engineering Societies' Building as a load-bearing wall. The parties also agreed to share the walkways behind both buildings and construct a steel-and-glass loading dock for freight. Additionally, in 1914, the United Engineering Societies filed plans for two more stories atop the roof. The Wells Construction Company built the annex. The weight of the extra stories could not be supported on the existing pilings, so four new columns were constructed through the building, supported directly on the bedrock.

The ASCE had been offered space at the Engineering Societies' Building in 1914, with the opportunity to be named as a "founding society" if it did so. The ASCE moved its headquarters to the Engineering Societies' Building by December 1917, after the additional stories were completed, and it became a "founding society". The Engineering Societies' Building continued to be used for major events, as in 1925, when U.S. Secretary of Commerce Herbert Hoover became an honorary ASCE member. The United Engineering Foundation held a fundraiser in 1928 to raise money for scientific research and to expand the library. The building also hosted conventions, such as for the electrical industry and for the mining and metallurgical industry.

==== 1950s ====
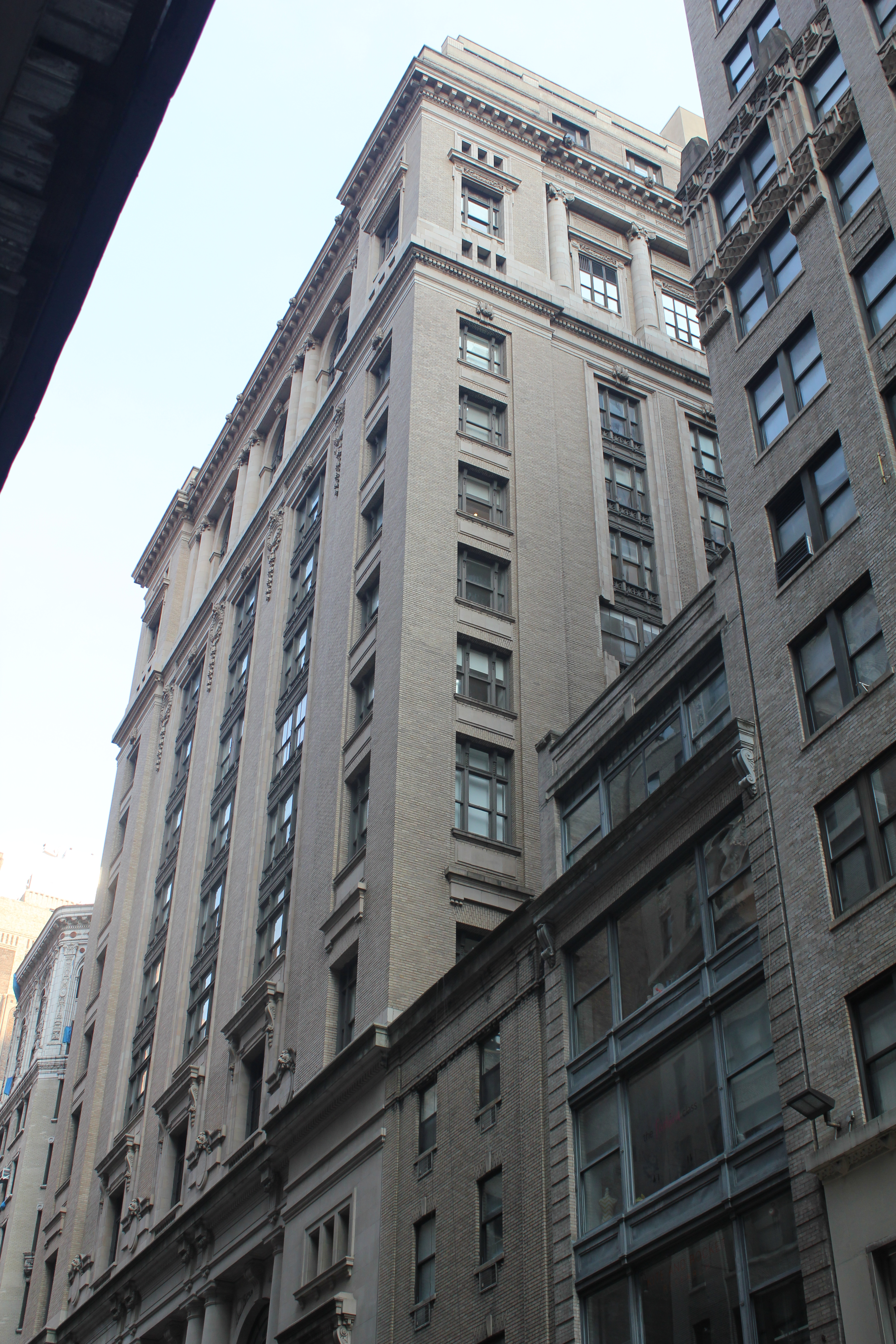
View from the east

By the 1950s, the Engineering Societies' and Engineers' Club buildings were becoming overburdened, in large part due to their own success. A 1955 New York Times article described the buildings as "the engineering crossroads of the world". The American Institute of Chemical Engineers (AIChE) had wanted to join the United Engineering Societies at 39th Street, but the existing structure was too small to accommodate one more club. This led the United Engineering Societies' four constituent organizations to consider relocating as early as 1953. The engineering societies had originally considered moving to Pittsburgh, though other cities such as Philadelphia and Chicago were also contemplated. The societies created a five-person committee in April 1955 to select a site and obtain financing. In response, the city and state governments of New York tried to convince the societies to stay within New York City.

By June 1956, the societies had voted against relocating out of the city. They were considering constructing an entrance from 40th Street on property owned by the Engineers' Club. A joint committee, consisting of three members each from the AIChE, ASCE, AIEE, AIME, and ASME, was created to determine the future of the clubhouse. In November 1956, Shreve, Lamb & Harmon were hired to conduct a study on whether to relocate the societies or redevelop the existing site. The Engineering Societies selected a site for a new clubhouse on First Avenue in Turtle Bay, Manhattan, across from the headquarters of the United Nations, in August 1957. Herbert Hoover announced plans for the new building that November, and construction on that building started in 1959. The societies began moving into the United Engineering Center in August 1961. (Note: The First Avenue building was demolished in 1998.)

=== Commercial use ===
==== 1960s to 1990s ====
The United Engineering Societies sold 25 West 39th Street to Fred Rudinger Associates in 1960 for $2 million. Rudinger planned to convert the basement, first story, and second story to a health club with a gymnasium, swimming pool, and saunas. The main lobby would become stores, the auditorium would be retained for fashion-industry events, and the other stories would become showrooms and offices. This did not happen and, by 1963, Rudinger planned to convert the building into a photographic center for about 30 studios displaced from the soon-to-be-destroyed Grand Central Palace. William B. Goldin was hired to design a new marble-and-walnut lobby. The top twelve stories had ceilings measuring 12 to 24 ft (3.7 to 7.3 m) high, making them ideal for photography equipment. The lowest four stories would have become a 150-spot garage with a vehicle lift. The renovation was designed by Wechsler & Schimenti. Structural engineer Eugene Ho determined the existing columns to be strong enough to support the weight of new floor slabs.

Women's clothing retailer Lane Bryant leased the 15th and 16th stories in 1964. The building was resold in 1969 to a client represented by Armand Lindenbaum, who paid $2.7 million. At the time, the lowest stories were characterized as containing a seven-story garage with 215 parking spots. The top twelve office stories had 120,000 ft^{2} (11,000 m^{2}) of space, occupied by tenants such as Lane Bryant and baby-food company Beech-Nut. By the 1980s, there was a wine bar-restaurant named Lavin's at 25 West 39th Street, as well as Caribbean tourism offices.

Fashion designer Tommy Hilfiger bought the building in 1996 as a showroom for his company, also called Tommy Hilfiger. The designer added a television studio with two cameras, and his clothing collection took up a portion of the old library. Hilfiger spent $56 million to renovate the building. Hilfiger's showroom grew so quickly that, by 1999, he had to lease space in other buildings nearby.

==== 2000s to present ====
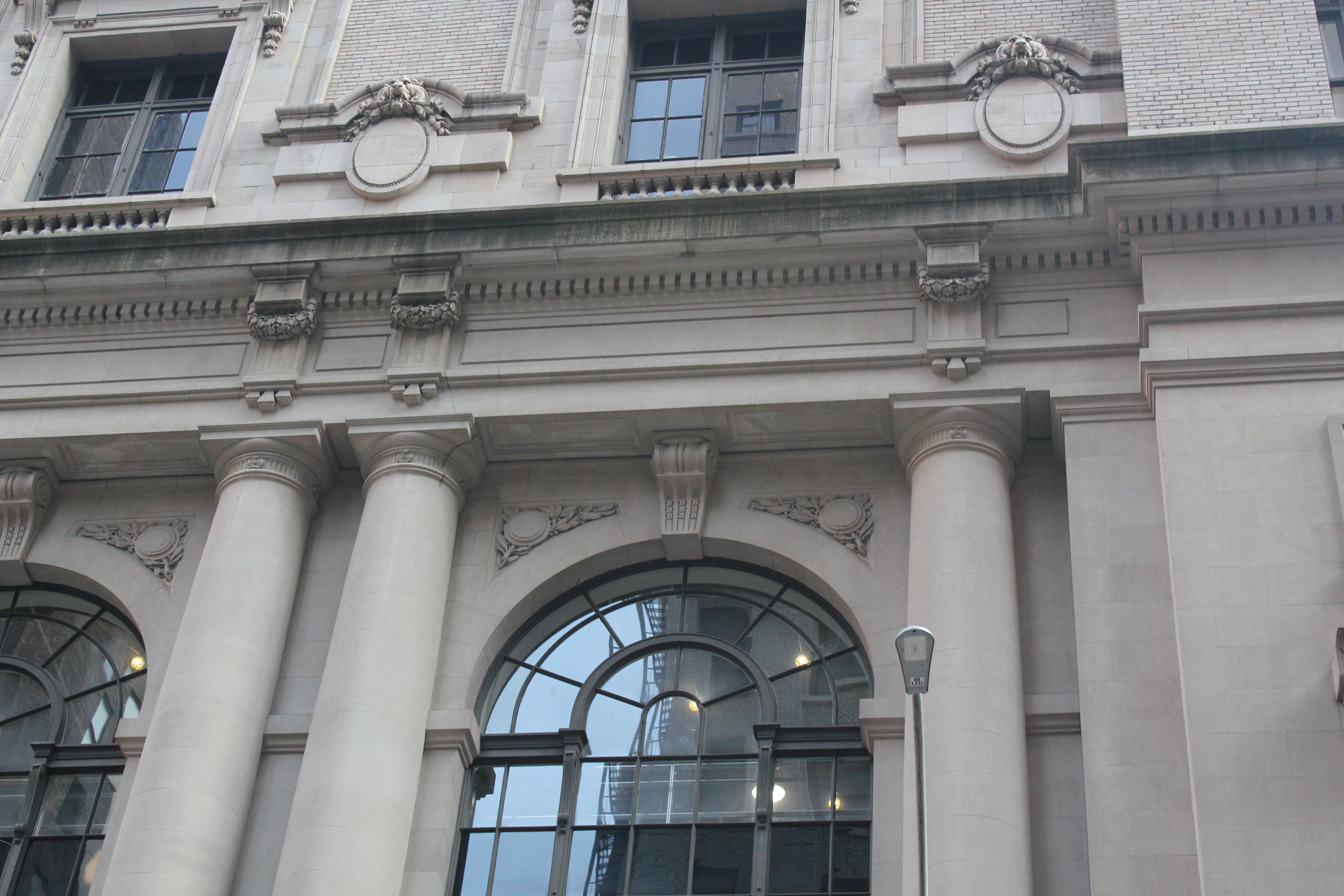
Detail of an end bay

As early as 2001, Hilfiger was considering selling 25 West 39th Street and an adjacent department store at 485 Fifth Avenue for a combined $100 million. In 2005, he sold the building to Crown Acquisitions and the Chetrit and Nakashe families for $53 million. His brand consolidated its showrooms at the Starrett–Lehigh Building in Chelsea, Manhattan, but had the right to occupy the building through June 2006. After the sale to Crown Acquisitions, three of the upper stories were leased to fashion brand 7 for all Mankind, fashion designer Rachel Roy, and watch company Movado. Clothing firm Polo Ralph Lauren leased three stories in 2007 and expanded to another story two years later. Thor Equities itself used 25 West 39th Street as its headquarters.

Per the terms of the 2005 sale contract, if 25 West 39th Street was resold before December 2006, Hilfiger was entitled to claim 20 percent of any profit. The buyer was legally 25 West 39th Street Realty, which in turn was controlled by a subsidiary of the Chetrit family; it transferred a full interest in the building to Thor Equities for $80 million in September 2006. This led Hilfiger to sue for breach of contract in June 2007, saying he was owed $5.4 million. The lawsuit was dismissed in 2008 because the sale involved the controlling interest in the property, rather than the property itself. Children's wear manufacturer Weeplay Kids, whose subsidiaries included Woolrich and Hello Kitty, leased a floor in 2014.

Thor Equities had hired a team to potentially place the building for sale by mid-2016, with an asking price of $200 million. Thor would continue to occupy space on three floors; at the time, the fifth and ninth floors were vacant. Thor leased one story to coworking company Spark Labs that August, and designer Halston took another story the following year. In late 2018, Thor leased space to Manhattan Community Squash Center. During 2019, Thor leased one story each to women's coworking space The Wing, engineering firm PVE, and marketing firm Converge. The next year, Thor hired Industrious to manage three floors of coworking space. Following the COVID-19 pandemic in New York City in 2020, Thor sued The Wing for $2.7 million in unpaid back rent. Music management firm Phase One Network took one story in 2021, and the building was fully occupied by January 2022.

== See also ==
- National Register of Historic Places listings in Manhattan from 14th to 59th Streets
- List of New York City Designated Landmarks in Manhattan from 14th to 59th Streets
