= Andrew Whitfield =

Andrew Whitfield may refer to:

- Andrew Whitfield (politician), South African politician
- Andrew Carnegie Whitfield (born 1910), nephew of wealthy steel magnate Andrew Carnegie, who mysteriously disappeared in New York in 1938
- Andy Whitfield (1971–2011), Welsh actor and model
