= Carnegie Library of Barnesville =

- U.S. National Register of Historic Places
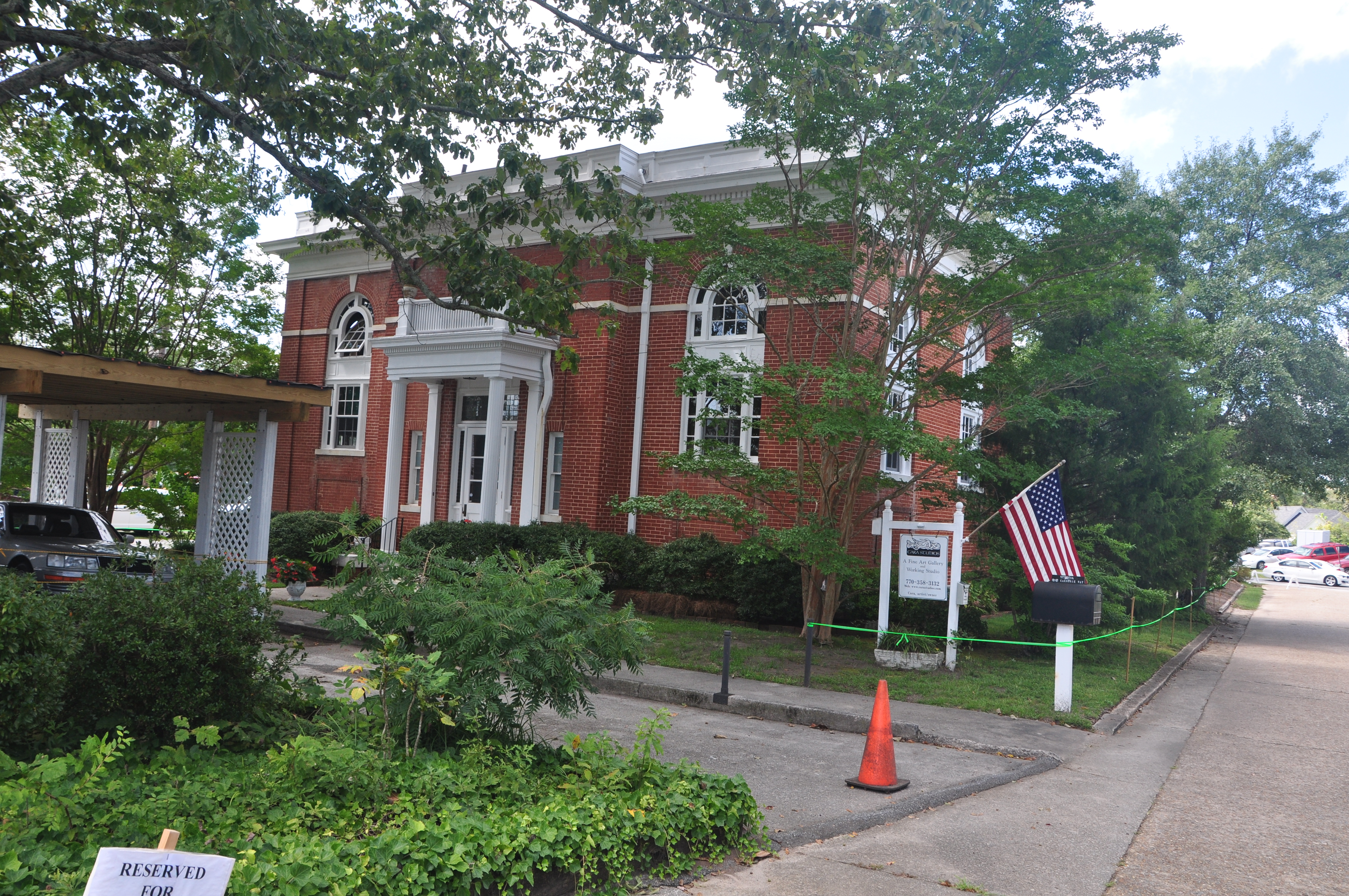

- Location within Georgia Location within the United States
- Location: Library St., Barnesville, Georgia
- Coordinates: 33°3′10″N 84°9′30″W
- Area: less than one acre
- Built: 1910
- Architect: Whitfield & King
- Architectural style: Georgian
- NRHP reference No.: 86003684
- Added to NRHP: February 3, 1987

The Carnegie Library of Barnesville, in Barnesville, Georgia, was built in 1910. It was designed by Whitfield & King. It was listed on the National Register of Historic Places in 1987. It is now a private home and studio.
