= Max G. Johl =

American philatelist

- Born: October 26, 1900
- Died: March 31, 1957 (aged 56)
- Organizations: Collectors Club of New York
- Known for: Co-author of the “United States Postage Stamps of the Twentieth Century” and officer of the Collectors Club of New York
- Awards: APS Hall of Fame; Crawford Medal; Luff Award

Col. Max G. Johl (October 26, 1900 – March 31, 1957) of Connecticut, was an American philatelist who specialized in the collecting of, and writing philatelic literature on, United States postage stamps.

== Collecting interests ==
Johl’s stamp collecting interests consisted of 20th Century postage stamps of the United States. Along with Beverly Sedgwick King, he co-authored “United States Postage Stamps of the Twentieth Century” (Vol. 1, 1932; Vol. 2, 1934).

Co-author Beverly King died in 1935, and Johl continued the work on “United States Postage Stamps of the Twentieth Century” and completed volume 3 in 1935 and volume 4 in 1938. He revised and enlarged volume 1 in 1937.

In 1947 he published his work “The United States Commemorative Stamps of the Twentieth Century, 1902-1947” in two volumes.

== Philatelic activity ==
Johl served as an officer at the Collectors Club of New York and was an officer and judge at CIPEX (Centenary International Philatelic Exhibition) in 1947.

== Honors and awards ==
Johl received numerous awards and honors including the Crawford Medal from the Royal Philatelic Society, London, as well as the Luff Award in 1950 and, in 1957, he signed the Roll of Distinguished Philatelists. He was named to the American Philatelic Society Hall of Fame in 1957.

== See also ==
- Philately
- Philatelic literature
