= Andrew Carnegie Whitfield =

Nephew of Andrew Carnegie

- Born: February 6, 1910; New York City, New York, U.S.
- Disappeared: April 17, 1938 (aged 28); Roosevelt Field, Mineola, New York, U.S.
- Education: Princeton University
- Occupation: Business executive
- Spouse: Elizabeth Halsey (m. 1937)
- Parent(s): Henry Davis Whitfield; Emily Harrison Thorp

Andrew Carnegie Whitfield (born February 6, 1910) was the nephew of wealthy steel magnate Andrew Carnegie, who mysteriously disappeared shortly after he departed from Roosevelt Field on Long Island, New York on the morning of April 17, 1938.

== Early life ==
Whitfield was born in New York City and was the son of Emily Harrison (Thorp) Whitfield and Henry Davis Whitfield. His father was the brother of Louise Whitfield Carnegie, the wife of Andrew Carnegie. Whitfield was a graduate of Princeton University and worked as a business executive. An amateur pilot, Whitfield owned a small red and silver Taylor Cub airplane which he occasionally flew (mostly for recreation). At the time of his disappearance, he had accumulated 200 hours of flying experience.

== Disappearance ==
Whitfield departed Roosevelt Field in Mineola in his small silver and red Taylor Cub monoplane, which he planned to land at an airfield in Brentwood, New York (approximately 22 miles (35 km) away). He was only supposed to be in the air for fifteen minutes, but he never arrived as scheduled. One source reported that Whitfield's plane had been flying steadily—but then Whitfield "nosed his plane into a mild easterly wind, [and] disappeared from sight."

His plane had enough fuel for a 150-mile flight. Neither Whitfield nor his plane has ever been recovered.

An investigation discovered that on the day he vanished Whitfield had checked into a hotel in Garden City on Long Island under an alias he occasionally employed: "Albert C. White". Hotel records indicated that Whitfield/White had paid $4 in advance for the room and never checked out. When the hotel room was searched, it was discovered that his personal belongings (including his passport), clothing, cuff links engraved with his initials, two life insurance policies (in his name listing his wife, Elizabeth Halsey Whitfield, as the beneficiary), and several stock and bond certificates made out in Andrew's and Elizabeth's names, were all left behind in the hotel room. Phone records also indicated that he had called his home while his family was out looking for him, and a telephone operator reported that she heard him say over the phone, "Well, I am going to carry out my plan."

Police concluded that Whitfield had committed suicide by deliberately flying his plane into the Atlantic Ocean despite there being no evidence to substantiate this theory. Although a thorough search of the coastal areas surrounding Long Island was conducted, no plane wreckage was ever discovered. There was no evidence that at the time of Whitfield's disappearance he was having any personal or business problems. Whitfield had married the former Elizabeth Halsey earlier that year and had been planning to move to Bethlehem, Pennsylvania, (with his new wife) the same month that he disappeared.

== See also ==
- List of people who have disappeared
