= Beverly Sedgwick King =

American architect and philatelist

- Born: December 22, 1876
- Died: March 4, 1935 (aged 58)
- Engineering career
- Institutions: Collectors Club of New York; American Philatelic Society
- Projects: Co-author of the "United States Postage Stamps of the Twentieth Century" and president of the Collectors Club of New York in 1933
- Awards: APS Hall of Fame

Beverly Sedgwick King (December 22, 1876 – March 4, 1935), of New York City, was an American architect, a partner with Henry D. Whitfield in the firm Whitfield & King. He is now known primarily for his work as a philatelist who specialized in the collecting of, and writing philatelic literature on, United States postage stamps.

== Collecting interests ==
King’s stamp collecting interests consisted of 20th Century postage stamps and revenues of the United States. Along with Max G. Johl, he co-authored the landmark “United States Postage Stamps of the Twentieth Century” (Vol. 1, 1932; Vol. 2, 1934).

== Philatelic activity ==
King was active at the Collectors Club of New York, serving as president in 1933. At the American Philatelic Society, he served as an editor for the society. He was also the longtime editor of the "Revenues" section of The American Philatelist, contributed a regular column on U.S. stamps for Stamps Magazine, and wrote articles for many other journals as well.

== Honors and awards ==
King was elected to the American Philatelic Society Hall of Fame in its first group of fifteen philatelists in 1941.

== Career as an architect ==
Whitfield & King benefited greatly from Harry Whitfield's connection to his brother-in-law, Andrew Carnegie. The firm designed a number of Carnegie Libraries around the United States, including those in Cleveland, Ohio, Honolulu, Hawaii, and South Worcester, Massachusetts, as well as the Eaton Memorial Library at Tufts University. In New York City, in addition to a garage for Carnegie at 55 East 90th Street, they also designed the Engineers' Club Building on West 40th Street.

== Later life ==
In 1933 President Franklin Delano Roosevelt appointed him Deputy Administrator of the National Recovery Administration, and he moved to Washington, D.C. He was killed two years later in that city when hit by a speeding vehicle near his house.

== See also ==
- Whitney & King
- Philately
- Philatelic literature
