= Louise Whitfield Carnegie =

American philanthropist (1857–1946)

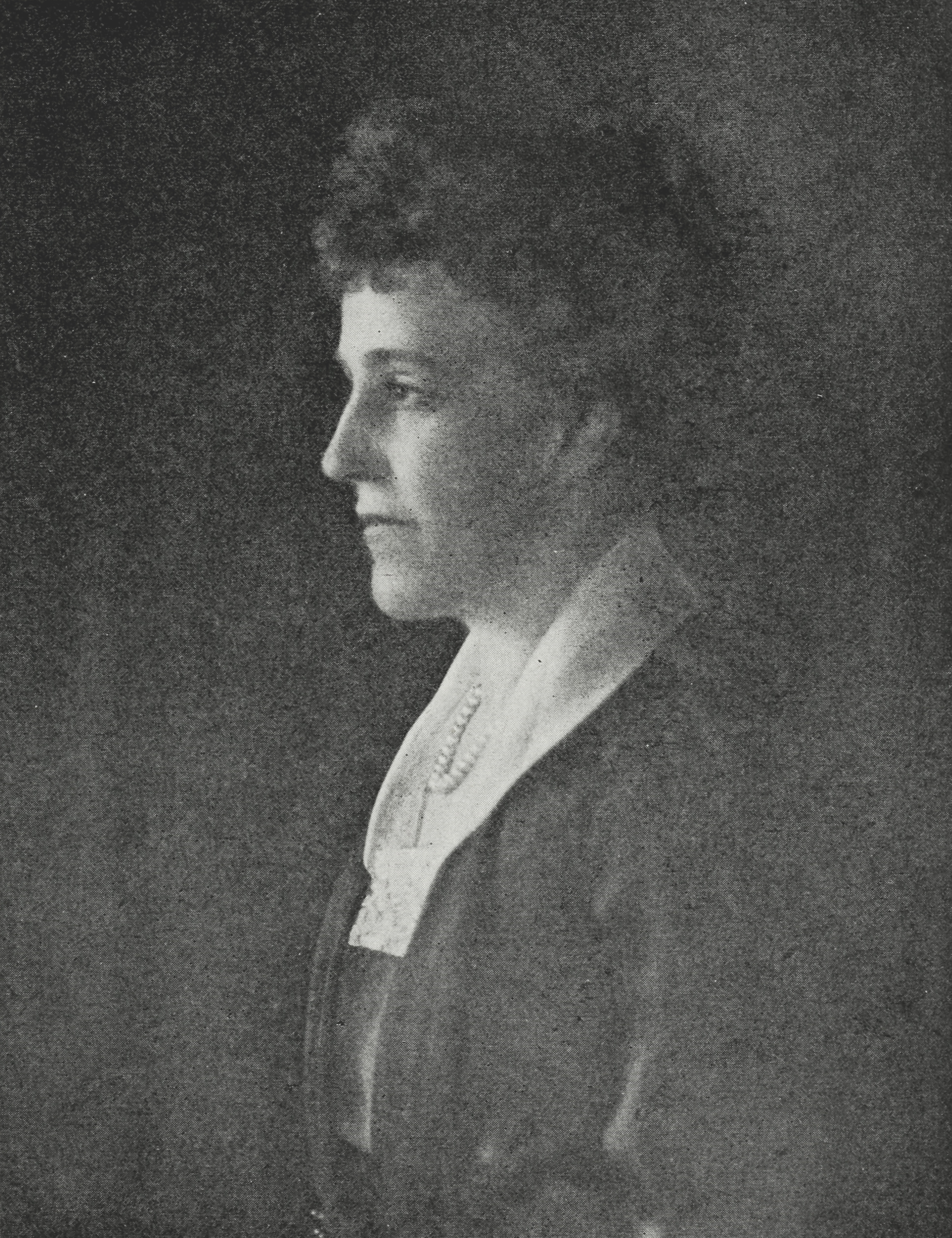
- Born: Louise Whitfield; March 7, 1857; New York City, New York, U.S.
- Died: June 24, 1946 (aged 89)
- Resting place: Sleepy Hollow Cemetery
- Spouse: Andrew Carnegie (m. 1887; died 1919)
- Children: Margaret Carnegie Miller
- Parent: John D. Whitfield; Fannie Davis
- Relatives: Henry Davis Whitfield (brother); Andrew Carnegie Whitfield (nephew)

Louise Whitfield Carnegie (March 7, 1857 – June 24, 1946) was an American philanthropist. She was the wife of Scottish-American industrialist and philanthropist Andrew Carnegie.

== Biography ==
=== Early life ===
Louise Whitfield was born on March 7, 1857, in the Chelsea neighborhood of Manhattan in New York City. Her parents—John D. Whitfield (died 1878), a prosperous New York City textile merchant, and Fannie Davis—descended from families who emigrated from England in the 1600s.

Reaching relative success, John moved the family from Chelsea to Gramercy Park and finally to a brownstone on West 48th Street and Fifth Avenue.

=== Adult life ===
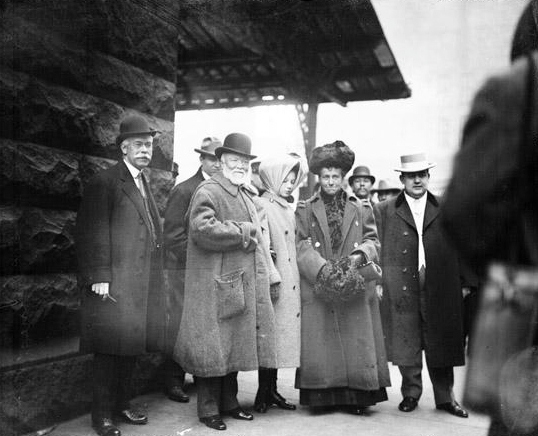
Louise Whitfield Carnegie with her husband Andrew Carnegie and their daughter Margaret Carnegie Miller.

At the age of 23, Whitfield met Andrew Carnegie, himself aged 45, through her father.

On April 22, 1887, Whitfield (now 30) married Carnegie (51) at her family's home in New York City in a private ceremony officiated by a pastor from the Church of the Divine Paternity, a Universalist church to which the Whitfields belonged. As a wedding gift from her husband, Louise received a home (formerly owned by Collis Potter Huntington) at 5 West 51st Street. Louise signed a prenuptial agreement, renouncing any claims to Andrew's fortune, and by the 'marriage settlement' agreed immediately after the wedding, Andrew gave her shares (stocks) and bonds that yielded her a personal income ("pin money") of approximately US$20,000 (equivalent to $716,667 in 2025) per year.

Ten years later, in 1897, Louise gave birth to the couple's only child, Margaret Carnegie. Louise and her daughter were members of the Brick Presbyterian Church and later the Church of the Divine Paternity (now the Fourth Universalist Society in the City of New York) for whom she and her husband funded their organ. The family moved to the Andrew Carnegie Mansion in Carnegie Hill, Manhattan, in December 1902.

Carnegie died at the age of 89 in Manhattan on June 24, 1946. She was buried in Sleepy Hollow Cemetery, in Sleepy Hollow, New York.

== Philanthropy ==
Louise was an influential member of the board of The Carnegie Corporation until her death. She advised Andrew Carnegie as they jointly helped the creation of over 2,500 libraries between 1883 and 1929.

After Andrew's death in 1919, Louise continued making charitable contributions to organizations including American Red Cross, the Y.W.C.A., the Cathedral of St. John the Divine, numerous World War II relief funds, and $100,000 to the Union Theological Seminary. She spent her summers at Skibo Castle.
