= Whitfield & King =

Whitfield & King was an architectural partnership of Henry Davis Whitfield and Beverly Sedgwick King (1876–1935). A number of the firm's works are listed on the National Register of Historic Places.

Whitfield was brother-in-law of Andrew Carnegie; his sister married Carnegie, and this helped the firm get work.

Works include:

- Carnegie Library, Moscow Ave. between Troy Ave. and Third St. Hickman, KY (Whitfield & King), NRHP-listed
- Carnegie Library of Barnesville, Library St. Barnesville, GA. Part of Thomaston Street Historic District. (Whitfield & King), NRHP-listed
- Eaton Hall, Tufts University, Medford, Massachusetts
- Engineers' Club Building, 30-32 W. 40th St. New York, NY (Whitfield & King), NRHP-listed
- Jennings Carnegie Public Library, 303 Cary Ave. Jennings, LA (Whitfield & King), NRHP-listed
- Thirty-sixth Street Branch Library, 347 E. 36th St. Minneapolis, MN (Whitfield, Henry D.), NRHP-listed
- U.S. Post Office and Office Building, Kinoole and Waianuenue Sts. Hilo, HI (Whitfield, Henry O.), NRHP-listed
- Anne Wallace Branch-Carnegie Library of Atlanta, 535 Luckie St. NW Atlanta, GA (Whitfield and King), NRHP-listed
- South Branch, Cleveland Library.
- Old Virginia (Carnegie) Public Library in Virginia, MN. The building opened in 1907 but was replaced just five years later after the original building became far too small for the needs of the community. The original Carnegie building was used by the Canadian Northern and Duluth, Winnipeg, and Pacific railroads, the YWCA, the Red Cross, and a wine house before being demolished in 1953 to make room for a municipal power plant expansion.
- The Carnegie Library on Howard University's Campus. The building was built in 1910 and served as the University's first and only library until the 1930s. The building now serves as the Office of Undergraduate Studies and the Office of the Dean of the Chapel.
