= Andrew Carnegie Mansion =

Museum building in Manhattan, New York

- U.S. National Register of Historic Places
- U.S. National Historic Landmark
- New York State Register of Historic Places
- New York City Landmark
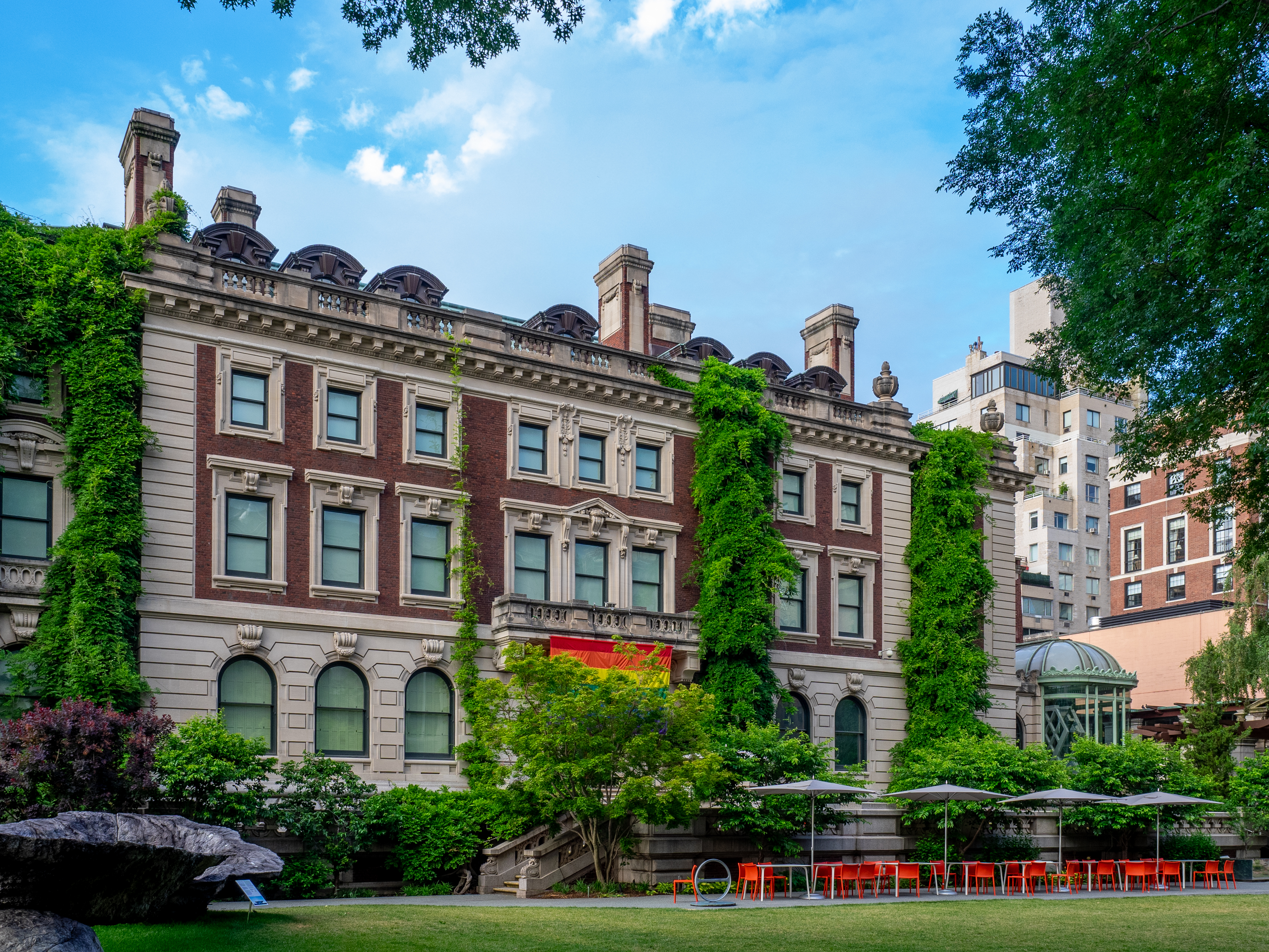
- Interactive map of Andrew Carnegie Mansion
- Location: 2 East 91st Street, Manhattan, New York
- Coordinates: 40°47′04″N 73°57′28″W
- Area: 1.2 acres (0.49 ha)
- Built: 1899–1902
- Architect: Babb, Cook & Willard
- Architectural style: Colonial Revival, Georgian Revival
- NRHP reference No.: 66000536
- NYSRHP No.: 06101.000266
- NYCL No.: 0674

Significant dates
- Added to NRHP: November 13, 1966
- Designated NHL: November 13, 1966
- Designated NYSRHP: June 23, 1980
- Designated NYCL: February 17, 1974

The Andrew Carnegie Mansion is a historic house and a museum building at 2 East 91st Street, along the east side of Fifth Avenue, on the Upper East Side of Manhattan in New York City. The three-and-a-half-story, brick and stone mansion was designed by Babb, Cook & Willard in the Georgian Revival style. Completed in 1902 for the industrialist Andrew Carnegie, his wife Louise, and their only child Margaret, it was the Carnegie family's residence until 1946. Since 1976, the house has been occupied by the Cooper-Hewitt Museum, part of the Smithsonian Institution. The mansion is internally connected to two townhouses at 9 East 90th Street (which became part of the building in the 1920s) and 11 East 90th Street, both of which are part of the Cooper-Hewitt.

The mansion occupies the northern portion of a 1.2-acre (0.49 ha) site, providing space for a garden to the south and west. Although the mansion has a mostly symmetrical design, there is a service wing and a metal-and-glass conservatory protruding from the eastern facade. The mansion was built with numerous mechanical features, including dedicated heating and cooling systems, a steel superstructure, and elevators. It contains at least 64 rooms across three basements and four above-ground stories, including the attic. The first-floor rooms include a stair hall, the conservatory, a picture gallery, a library, and various other family rooms. On the upper floors were the Carnegies' bedrooms, guest bedrooms, and staff quarters. These rooms have been modified over the years; since 1976, the interiors have hosted the museum's exhibition spaces and research facilities.

Carnegie purchased land on the Upper East Side in 1898 and hired Babb, Cook & Willard following an architectural design competition. The Carnegies moved into the mansion on December 12, 1902, spending their time between the New York City house and Skibo Castle in Scotland. Carnegie and his wife Louise lived there until their respective deaths in 1919 and 1946. In the early 1920s, the mansion was connected with 9 East 90th Street, where Margaret lived from 1920 to 1948. Following a renovation, the Columbia University School of Social Work occupied the house from 1949 to 1971. The Carnegie Corporation gave the house and property to the Smithsonian in 1972, and the Cooper-Hewitt Museum opened there in 1976 following renovations by Hardy Holzman Pfeiffer Associates. The house underwent further renovations in the late 1990s and the early 2010s.

The mansion is a New York City designated landmark and a National Historic Landmark. The Carnegie Mansion has received architectural commentary over the years. The construction of the mansion spurred other wealthy New Yorkers to build their homes nearby, and Carnegie's presence there influenced the name of the surrounding area, which has come to be called Carnegie Hill. In addition, over the years, the mansion has been depicted in several films and TV series.

== Site ==
The Andrew Carnegie Mansion is at 2 East 91st Street in the Carnegie Hill section of the Upper East Side of Manhattan in New York City. It stands on 1.2 acres (0.49 ha) of land between Fifth Avenue and Central Park to the west, 90th Street to the south, and 91st Street to the north. The rectangular land lot occupies about half of its city block and covers 46,415 square feet (4,312 m^{2}), with a frontage of around 200 feet (61 m) on Fifth Avenue and 230 feet (70 m) on the side streets. Prior to the acquisition of additional property in the early 20th century, the site measured just over 200 feet on Fifth Avenue and 90th Street, and 230 feet on 91st Street. Built for the industrialist Andrew Carnegie and later converted into the Cooper-Hewitt Museum, the mansion was finished in 1902 and was near the north end of Fifth Avenue's Millionaires' Row. Carnegie initially referred to the area around his home as "the Highlands of Fifth Avenue".

The grounds are enclosed by a metal fence with stone posts. A garden, designed by Guy Lowell and Richard Schermerhorn Jr., occupies the southern half of the site and wraps around to the western frontage. During the garden's construction, workers excavated the bedrock around the house to a depth of 5 feet (1.5 m) or 10 feet (3.0 m). Workers used loam from the old Fleetwood Park Racetrack in the Bronx to fill and grade the pit. The plantings included ivy, rhododendrons, azaleas, roses, and wisterias. The garden originally had around 30 mature trees, (Note: Sources disagree on whether the garden had 28, 29, or 30 trees in total.) which were clustered around the eastern boundary of the site; these included cherry, oak, chestnut, and beech trees, which remained intact in the late 20th century. There were also flower beds and pathways, and, on the eastern side, a rock garden. The garden, which has since become part of the Cooper-Hewitt Museum, was renamed the Arthur Ross Terrace and Garden in 1991. Following a 2015 renovation, the Arthur Ross Terrace and Garden retained its rock garden and pathways, and a seating area and a southern entrance to the mansion were added. There is also an elevated walkway next to the mansion, overlooking the garden. As of 2016, people can access the garden without paying an admission fee or going through the museum first.

At the southeast corner of the main mansion is the McAlpin–Miller House at 9 East 90th Street, formerly owned by George L. McAlpin and then by Carnegie's daughter Margaret Miller. The mansion is connected with 9 East 90th Street, and the two buildings share a land lot. The mansion is also internally connected to 11 East 90th Street, and it abuts 15 and 17 East 90th Street and the Spence School to the east. The Church of the Heavenly Rest is directly across 90th Street to the south, while the Otto H. Kahn House, James A. Burden House, John Henry Hammond House, and John and Caroline Trevor House (from west to east) are across 91st Street to the north. The mansion is also part of Fifth Avenue's Museum Mile; it is near the Jewish Museum in the Felix M. Warburg House one block north, as well as the Solomon R. Guggenheim Museum one block south.

== Architecture ==
The Carnegie Mansion was designed by Babb, Cook & Willard. Though the brick-and-limestone facade is designed in the Georgian Revival style, it also includes Beaux-Arts design elements. The Chicago Daily Tribune wrote that, during the mansion's construction, the structure was variously described as Dutch Colonial Revival and French Renaissance, although it incorporated elements of several architectural styles. The Washington Post described the house as "modified Georgian eclectic". The site includes 9 East 90th Street, which was completed in 1903 or 1905. The latter house was designed by George Keister in the Georgian Revival style and includes Beaux-Arts design elements.

=== Form and facade ===
==== Main mansion ====
The mansion is a 3 1/2-story structure, finished in brick and stone. All four elevations of the facade are visible from the street. To maximize the size of the garden, the Carnegie Mansion sits along the extreme northern boundary of the site, along 91st Street. The architects intended for the house's symmetrical design, as well as its use of relatively simple architectural details, to de-emphasize its large size. The northern and southern elevations are both divided vertically into eleven bays. The western and eastern elevations have similar decorations to the northern and southern elevations, except that they are five bays wide. A brick-and-stone service wing (originally the art gallery) protrudes off the northern portion of the eastern elevation. Just south of this wing is a metal-and-glass conservatory with a base of rusticated stone blocks and an east-facing pergola. At the rear of the mansion is a passageway made of brick, cedar wood, and granite, which connects with the houses at 9 and 11 East 90th Street.

The first story of the facade is clad with rusticated stone blocks. As built, there is a curved sidewalk on 91st Street, which leads to the main entrance. A short flight of steps leads up from the sidewalk to a raised terrace. The entrance itself consists of double doors within a semicircular arch. There is a glass canopy above the main entrance, which was designed by Louis Comfort Tiffany. Early plans for the house called for the terrace to surround the entire mansion, but Carnegie ordered that the terrace be removed when the mansion was nearly completed. When the mansion was renovated in the mid-1990s, the steps in front of the main entrance were extended outward, and a ramp was installed behind a balustrade. On the rest of the first story, there are arched openings topped by ornate keystones. There is an areaway between the house and 91st Street. There is a secondary entrance on 90th Street, which was added as part of a 2014 renovation of the Cooper-Hewitt Museum.

The upper stories are clad with brick and have stone quoins at their corners. On the northern and southern elevations, the nine center bays are clustered in three sets of three, and quoins separate each group of bays from each other and from the bay at either end. On the second floor of the northern and southern elevations, there are protruding balconies within the central group of bays, as well as in the end bays. The center three bays on the western elevation also have a balcony at the second floor. The center bay of the eastern elevation has an oriel window at that story. Each window is surrounded by a stone frame; these surrounds are all topped by cornices, and there are triangular pediments above some windows.

Atop the facade is a stone cornice, which in turn is topped by a stone balustrade and urns. The cornice is ornamented with modillions. There are arched dormer windows with copper sheathing above the third floor. In addition, the roof is topped by brick-and-limestone chimneys.

==== 9 East 90th Street ====
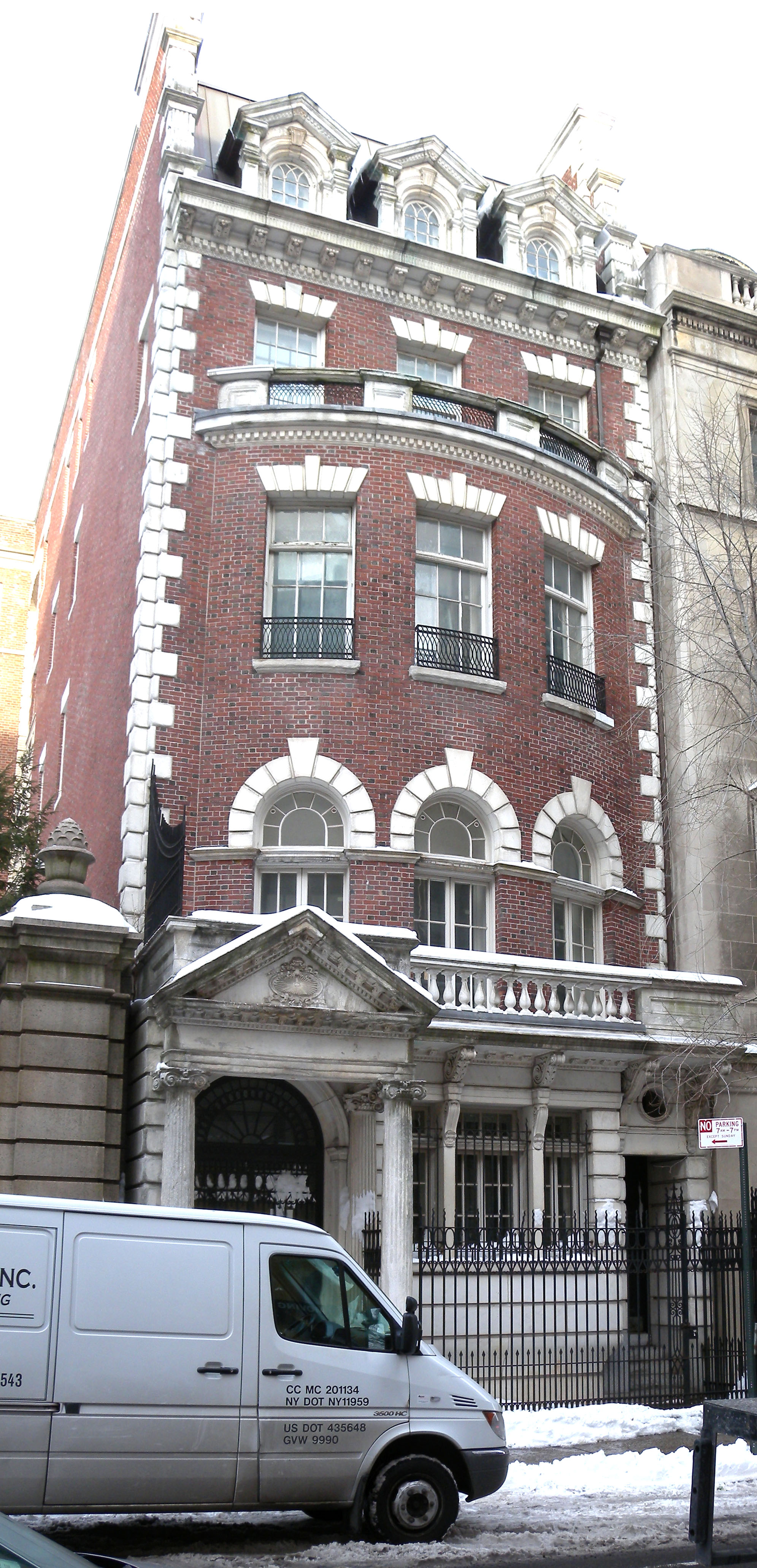
9 East 90th Street

9 East 90th Street (also known as the McAlpin–Miller House, McAlpin House, or Miller House) is a five-story structure that has been connected with the Carnegie Mansion since 1920. The southern elevation of the house is largely built of brick with stone trim, except the first story, which is made of rusticated blocks of white marble. On the upper stories, there are marble quoins at either corner of the facade. The window openings consist of both double-hung windows and casement windows. The western elevation is clad in red brick. There is also a brick annex in the rear, with stone quoins and various windows.

At the left side of the ground story, Ionic columns flank the entryway and support a triangular pediment above. The second and third stories curve outward, and there is a marble balcony in front of the second story. The balcony is accessed by French doors on the second story, which are topped by arched stone voussoirs. The third story has rectangular windows with splayed lintels above. There is a balustrade atop the curved third story, which is made of marble and iron. Above the fourth story is a marble cornice with modillions. The sloped roof contains projecting dormer windows. The side walls of the house protrude from either side of the fourth story.

=== Mechanical features ===
The Carnegie Mansion was among the first residences in New York City with a steel superstructure and private Otis elevator. The mansion was equipped with five electric elevators from the outset, at a time when many elevators were hydraulic. Two of the elevators carried passengers: one elevator ran only between the first and third floors, while another was used by servants and traveled between the attic and the lowest basement. There was also a dumbwaiter, which may have been one of the first dumbwaiters to use direct current, as well as a lift that was used to bring plants to the conservatory. Yet another elevator, between the third basement and first floor, was used specifically for dumping ashes. One of the original elevators is preserved at the National Museum of American History.

The Carnegie Mansion was equipped with extensive mechanical systems and a large amount of equipment. There was a central-heating plant, generators, cooling system, and artesian well. The heating plant was large enough to meet the needs of an ocean liner, while the air-cooling system was among the first in a private residence in the U.S. Outdoor air was drawn from openings in the attic and through air filters in the basement, then heated, moistened, and distributed to each room. On the first through third floors, the temperature in each room was controlled by a thermostat. Water from the New York City water supply system was drawn into the basement, filtered, and then separated into drinking and domestic water. Edward F. Caldwell & Co. installed an electric lighting system throughout the mansion. The electricity, sewage, and water intakes could all be regulated by a master switchboard.

=== Interior ===
The mansion has four above-ground stories including the attic. There are three basements, which accommodated the house's heating system. Although several sources state that the Carnegie Mansion was built with 64 rooms, other sources state that there were 66 or 80 rooms. These spaces included thirty bedrooms, several drawing rooms, and an art-gallery room. Later subdivisions increased the number of rooms in the mansion to 88 or 99. The mansion was built with a total floor area of 55,315 square feet (5,138.9 m^{2}). On each floor, a west–east hall spans the entire house. Most of the house has parquet wood floors; the conservatory was the only room in the house with a tiled floor. Various portraits of Andrew Carnegie were placed around the house when he lived there. There are also plasterwork ceilings throughout the mansion, in addition to motifs depicting acorns and oak leaves.

The house was built with a grand staircase made of imported Scottish oak. The stairway originally led from the first floor to the third; one flight was removed in the 1940s and restored in the 1970s. Another, curved stairway was installed prior to the 1940s; it had a similar ornate balustrade to the main stairway.

A two-story passageway, completed in the 1990s, links the mansion to the townhouses at 9 and 11 East 90th Street and houses the Agnes Bourne Bridge Gallery. Originally, 9 East 90th Street had either 39, 45, or 47 rooms. After the townhouses were converted to the Cooper-Hewitt National Design Library in 2011, the Fred & Rae S. Friedman Rare Book Room was housed at 9 East 90th Street, while 11 East 90th Street contains the reception room, the Arthur Ross Reading Room, and another reading room for quiet study.

==== Basements ====
The third and lowest basement level had three water filters, a large furnace, and a coal bin that could store 200 short tons (180 long tons; 180 t) of coal. A miniature railroad ran between the furnace and coal bin, carrying up to 1,500 pounds (680 kg) of coal at once; it transported 3,000 pounds (1,400 kg) of coal daily. There was an Italian-tile turntable for this miniature railroad. The second basement had a laundry, ironing room, and drying room; and pipes connecting the furnace to radiators on the upper floors. The first basement had two kitchens, a linen closet, storage rooms, and servants' quarters. There was a wine closet next to the kitchens, with terracotta walls that could hold 3,000 bottles. Also in the first basement was a central telephone switchboard that served 20 phones in the house, as well as a steward's room, a servants' sitting room, and servants' bathrooms.

The basement spaces were clad with glazed brick to prevent dust from accumulating. In addition to housing the mechanical plant, the basements were used for storing gifts and as roller-skating rinks for the female servants (who were not allowed to leave the house at night).

==== First story ====
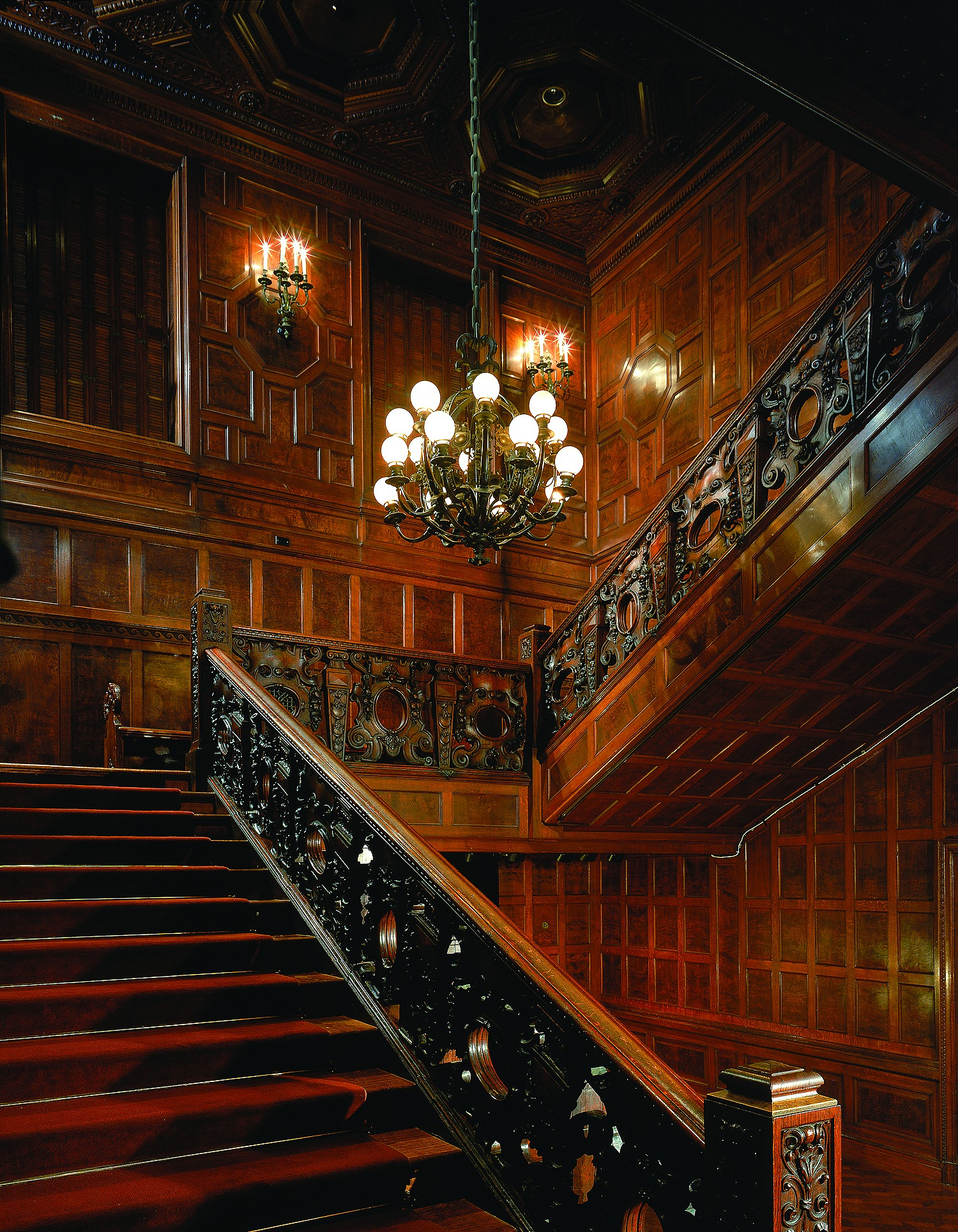
The grand staircase

The layout of the first story was dictated by the dimensions of the dining room, on the southern side of the house, which was the first room to be designed. The entrance on 91st Street leads to a marble entrance vestibule. To the left (east) of the entrance vestibule is the staircase hall and a split-level space that was converted to a coat room at some point. To the right or west was the formal waiting room, which became a cloakroom in 1976. One visitor described the waiting room as a space with dark woodwork, accessed by a small flight of stairs. Originally, the Carnegies' business visitors were directed to the waiting room, while friends and family went straight, into the main hall. As of 2014, the Cooper-Hewitt's gift shop and the Tarallucci e Vino cafe occupy parts of the first floor.

The main hall runs from west to east. The walls and coffered ceiling are made of oak; when the house was being built, Carnegie rejected proposals to clad the walls with marble or to hang tapestries on them. On the hall's south wall is a tympanum made of stained glass, as well as a doorway to the reception room, which is decorated with roundels. Lincrusta friezes topped the walls. At the eastern end of the main hall was a 3,000-pipe organ made by Aeolian-Skinner, which was played regularly until 1946 and was moved to the Nassau Center for the Fine Arts in Roslyn Harbor, New York, in 1974. A decorative fireplace was on the western end of the hall, opposite the organ. The main hall also had various pieces of furniture, in addition to a statue of Mercury, the god of commerce. Following a 2014 renovation, there is a visitor desk on the west side of the main hall, which can be hidden behind a 2,000-pound (910 kg) door during major events.

The southern edge of the house contains the drawing room, reception room, dining room, breakfast room, and a conservatory extending from the breakfast room. The drawing room, or parlor, was decorated in the Louis XV style. The reception room was directly across the main hall from the entry hall. It was originally painted in pale yellow and cream colors, with five crystal chandeliers and Tiffany glass windows. The dining room, to the east of the reception room, measures 36 by 25 feet (11.0 by 7.6 m) and had a serpentine marble fireplace, damask wall coverings, walnut paneling, and a dumbwaiter from the kitchen. Near the southeast corner of the house is the breakfast room, which could fit 22 people. It was originally outfitted with walnut paneling, bronze-and-glass lamps, a plaster ceiling with molded geometric patterns, and a custom wall covering. Adjacent to the breakfast room is the conservatory (officially the Barbara Riley Levin Conservatory), which could accommodate 600 guests. The conservatory occupies a separate glass-and-iron enclosure and had a marble fountain and its own elevator, heating, and ventilation.

There is a butler's pantry and steward's cabinet on the eastern side of the first floor, behind the organ machinery room. A rear hall, at the house's northeast corner, includes a servants' stair and a service elevator. The rear hall leads to the picture gallery, which originally had a leaded glass skylight that was removed by the 1970s. The room had the Carnegies' artwork and a piano; after a 1913 modification, it also had a marble fireplace and French windows. When the Columbia University School of Social Work renovated the house in 1949, the drawing room became a reading room, while the picture gallery became an auditorium.

On the western side of the first floor are Carnegie's private office, library room, and den. The library room, designed by the artist Lockwood de Forest, is the only interior space that he designed that remains in its original location. It has a fireplace with the motto "The Hearth Our Altar, Its Flame Our Sacred Fire" inscribed into it. Because Carnegie had requested that his office face Central Park, the library room occupies most of the western frontage, while Carnegie's former office occupies the southwestern corner. The doorway to the office was only 6 feet (1.8 m) high; this was done to draw attention away from Carnegie's short stature, as he was 5 ft 2 in (1.57 m) tall. Both rooms have oak wainscoting and inscriptions in gold letters atop the walls. Reflecting Carnegie's heritage, many of the inscriptions were quotations from Scottish poets. When Carnegie was alive, both rooms displayed awards that Carnegie had received, as well as objects relating to him, including a certificate of Carnegie's first-ever stock purchase.

==== Second story ====
The second floor contained the Carnegie family's private rooms, such as dressing rooms, bedrooms, a family library, and a billiard room. Originally, there was a stuffed barracuda at the top of the stairway landing, as well as a central hall with columns, painted pilasters, and oak ceiling beams. The hallway still exists and has ornate doorways leading off either side. The family library and billiard room occupy the northern side of the second floor, next to the staircase hall. De Forest designed the family library, which had an ornate fireplace, frieze, paneling, corbels, and stenciled ceiling decoration; it was illuminated by Tiffany lamps.

Andrew, his wife Louise, and their only child Margaret each had their own bedrooms at the northwest, southwest, and southeast corners of the second floor, respectively. Both parents had their own bathrooms; Louise Carnegie also had her own dressing room and sitting room, while Margaret had her own sitting room or day nursery. De Forest decorated Andrew's dressing room with carved wood from India. In addition, there was a nurse's room, a bathroom, and a nursery pantry clustered around the eastern part of the house, next to Margaret's bedroom. These rooms housed Margaret's nurse "Nannie" Lockerbie, the only servant who stayed on the second floor.

The bedrooms were converted to classrooms in 1949, and some of the walls were knocked down in the 1970s when the second story was converted to galleries. As of 2014, the second story hosts the Cooper-Hewitt Museum's permanent exhibits. These exhibits include an interactive "immersion room" in Margaret's former bedroom.

==== Third and fourth stories ====
On the third story were bedrooms for the Carnegies' visitors. The third floor's central hallway has a coved ceiling and stained-glass laylight with plaster frame. Andrew and his daughter had their own gymnasiums on the third floor, which were converted to exhibition space in 1949. Louise's sister Stella had a suite of rooms on the third story, including a living room, bedroom, bathroom, and numerous closets. Another room, where Margaret was tutored as a child, had burlap coverings so she could pin her assignments to the walls. There were also a guest bedroom, a trunk room, multiple bathrooms, and bedrooms for guests' servants. The third floor was subdivided into offices after the Carnegies died. In 1976, the third floor became the Cooper Hewitt Museum's library, known as the Doris and Henry Dreyfuss Study Center. The Barbara and Morton Mandel Design Gallery, measuring 6,000 square feet (560 m^{2}), was added to the third floor during a 2010s renovation.

The house's servants originally had the fourth story to themselves. Unlike the rest of the house, the fourth floor was not insulated and did not have ventilation; it was relatively simple in design, with white glazed tiles. The fourth story consisted of numerous bedrooms arranged around a hall; at the center of the hallway, a bronze railing surrounded the third-floor laylight. Female servants occupied most of the rooms, while male servants lived near the southwest corner. There were also two storage rooms: one each for Louise Carnegie and for the housekeeper. The fourth floor was subdivided after the Carnegies died. Since the 1990s, the Design Resource Center has occupied the fourth story, extending into 9 and 11 East 90th Street. The fourth story includes the Henry Luce Study Room for American Art and the Drue Heinz Study Center for Drawings and Prints.

== History ==
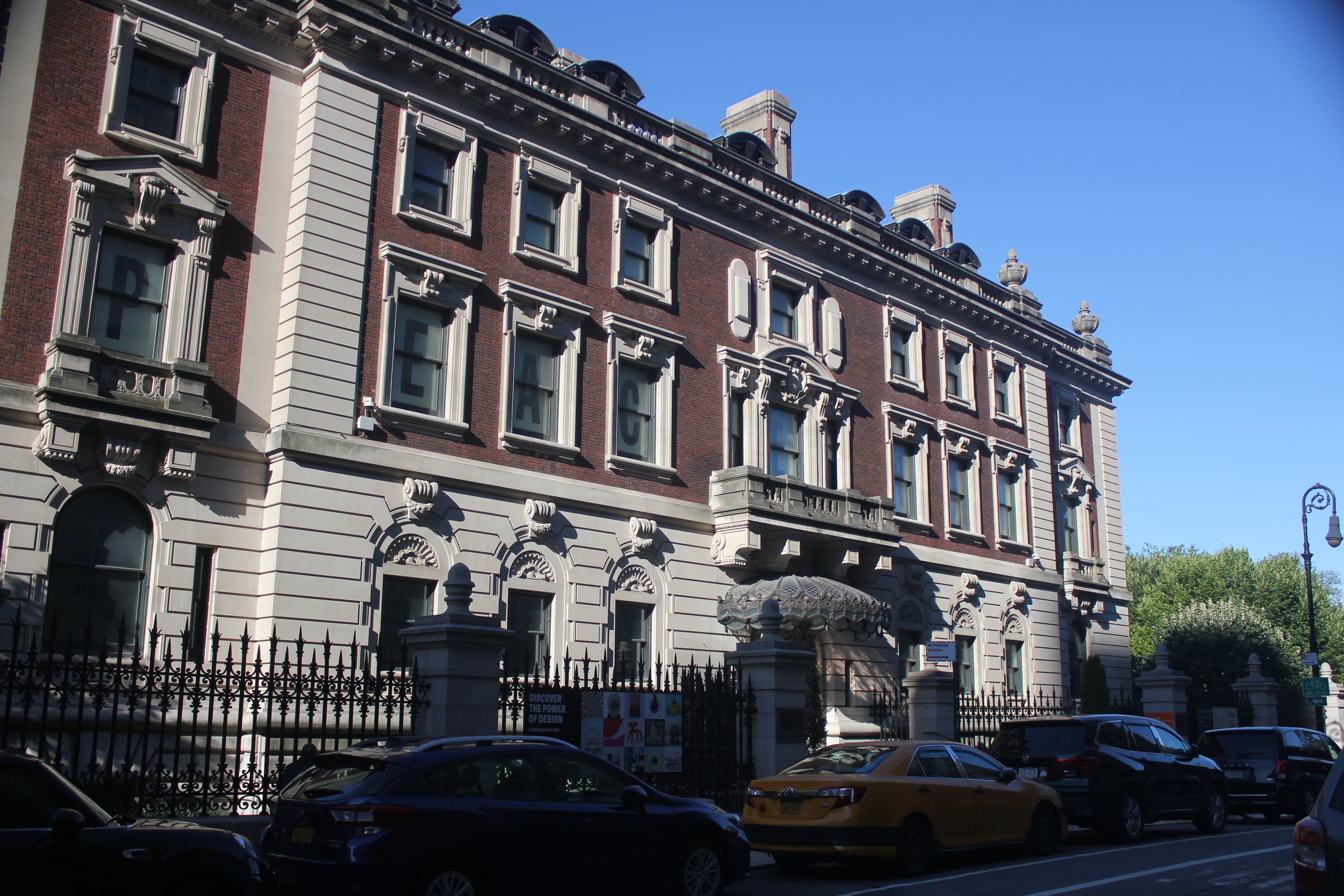
Northern facade

Andrew Carnegie, born in Scotland in 1835, immigrated to the U.S. as a child. During the late 19th century, he founded the Carnegie Steel Company, which became one of the largest American steel firms. Carnegie had shared a hotel suite with his mother until he married Louise Whitfield at the age of 51. The newlyweds then lived near Fifth Avenue and 51st Street in Midtown Manhattan. The family spent their summers at Skibo Castle, their estate in Scotland. Carnegie had been happy with the 51st Street house, which had been a wedding gift for Louise, and their daughter Margaret was born there in 1897. After Margaret was born, Carnegie asked painter Howard Russell Butler to devise plans for a renovation of the 51st Street house. Louise, who wanted to build a completely new house, discussed with Butler the possibility of designing a completely new house in New York City.

=== Development ===
As late as the end of the 19th century, few of the city's wealthy residents lived on Fifth Avenue north of the 70s streets. Many of Fifth Avenue's wealthy residents, including the Carnegies, lived around the 50s streets in Midtown Manhattan. Louise wanted a residence that took up "a square of four lots", which would provide a large amount of space for Margaret. Before deciding to move to the neighborhood that became Carnegie Hill, Carnegie had considered relocating to Fifth Avenue, albeit further south. Carnegie Hill had retained a somewhat rural character until the 1880s, when brownstone row houses were built there, and one source had described the area as being "only one remove from goatville". Real-estate agent Lawrence B. Elliman obtained options for land on both Fifth Avenue and Riverside Drive; at the time, many of the city's wealthiest people lived on Riverside Drive. By the late 1890s, the area included various brownstones and shanties.

==== Land acquisition ====
In December 1898, Carnegie bought all of the lots on Fifth Avenue between 90th and 92nd streets for about $900,000, a rate of about $11 to $14 per square foot ($120 to $150/m^{2}). The acquisition, which Butler and an associate had arranged in secrecy, included 17 land lots on one block and 13 lots on the other. At the time, the site was about 20 blocks away from any other mansion on Fifth Avenue. Contemporary newspapers reported that he had bought these plots because his friend Charles A. Gould was developing his own house nearby, while the author Michael Kathrens says that Carnegie had wanted the site because his doctor had advised him to seek "the park and sunshine" for his daughter. Carnegie and Gould had planned to erect their houses on the northern plot, between 91st and 92nd streets, and a "public building of some kind" on the southern plot. Carnegie purchased a plot on the north side of 90th Street in January 1899, increasing the size of the southern plot. He ultimately decided to erect his mansion on the southern plot. Carnegie also acquired several houses on the south side of 91st Street, which he rented exclusively to his friends, such as Carl Schurz.

Carnegie retained ownership of several lots to protect his home's value. He did sell off parcels over the years, but only to "congenial neighbors", namely people who were willing to build similarly ornate mansions. Carnegie sold four land lots on 91st Street to the businessman William Douglas Sloane in December 1900, After Sloane and Carnegie swapped additional land in 1901, Sloane's sons-in-law James A. Burden and John Henry Hammond built their own mansions at 7 and 9 East 91st Street, respectively. Another industrialist, James Burden's uncle I. Townsend Burden, bought the site at the southwest corner of 92nd Street and Fifth Avenue in December 1902. (Note: I. Townsend Burden's house was replaced with apartments in 1925.) Carnegie sold a parcel east of Hammond's house in 1909, which became the home of the lawyer John B. Trevor, and he sold the corner of Fifth Avenue and 91st Street to the banker Otto H. Kahn in 1913. Carnegie sold off the last of his holdings on the northern block in 1916.

Although Carnegie was wealthy enough to buy almost all the other lots directly surrounding the house, he never bought the lots at 14–18 East 90th Street to the south; the reason for this is not known. Carnegie was also initially unable to buy the sites at 9 and 11 East 90th Street, although these lots were both later connected to the mansion; these lots had been owned since 1888 by the family of tobacco magnate David Hunter McAlpin. David's son George L. McAlpin built his house at 9 East 90th Street, and the McAlpin family retained that land lot until June 1919, when it was sold to the Title Guarantee and Trust Company. The adjacent building at 11 East 90th Street housed George's brother William W. McAlpin.

==== Design and construction ====
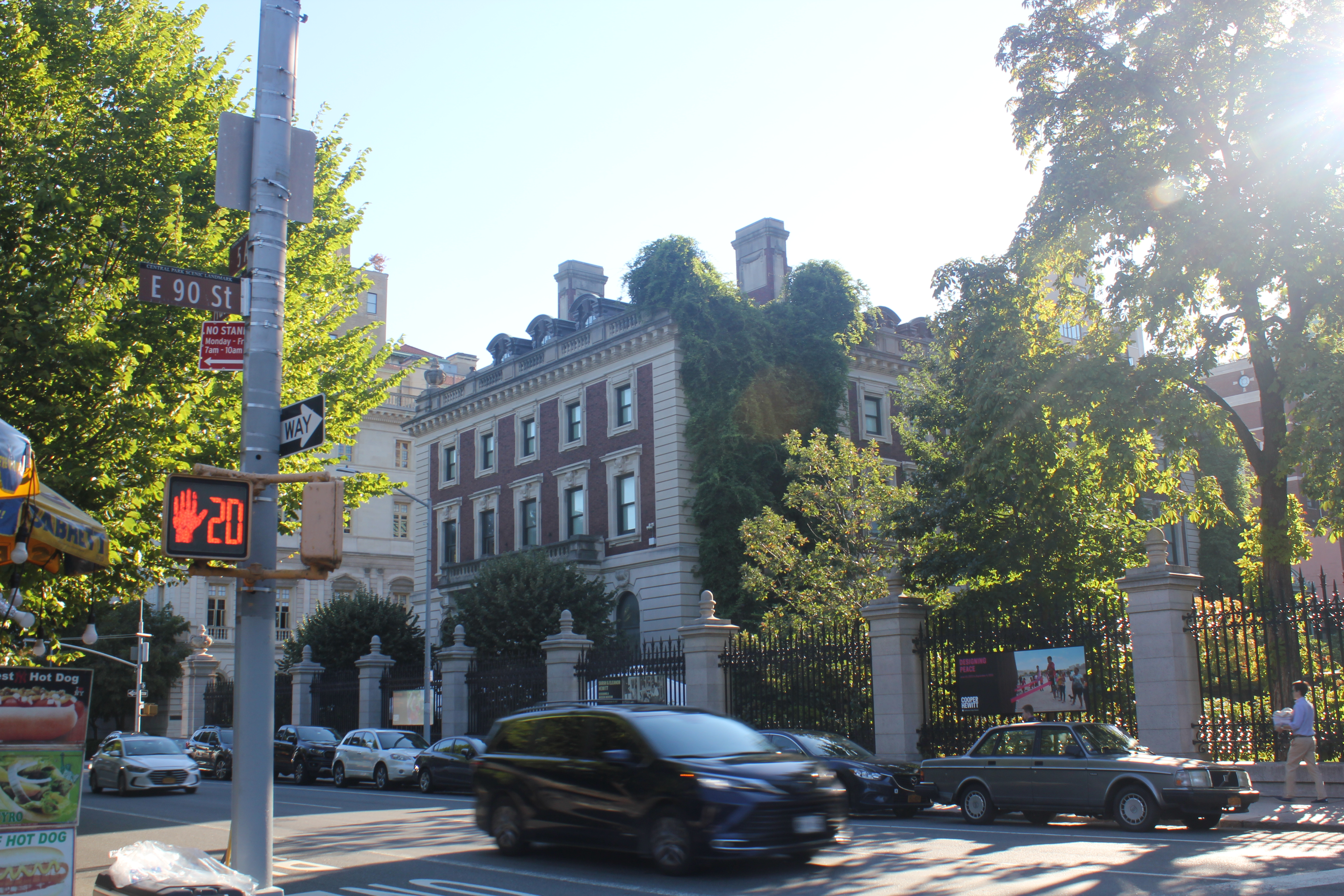
View from Fifth Avenue and 90th Street

During 1898, Carnegie's private secretary visited houses in other countries to determine what features to include in Carnegie's proposed mansion. The size was large enough for a garden. Carnegie stated that he did not want "a grand palace", but rather "the most modest, plainest and most roomy house in New York". At the beginning of 1899, Carnegie devised blueprints for the first and second floors; he dictated some of the design details and insisted that the mansion not include a ballroom. After the initial blueprints were complete, Carnegie invited Henry J. Hardenbergh; Howard, Cauldwell & Morgan; and Babb, Cook & Willard to prepare plans for the mansion. Although none of the three architects specialized in mansion design, Butler knew all of the architects, and Carnegie said "they were the only architects in the city who had not begged for the job". In contrast to Babb, Cook & Willard's Georgian design, Hardenbergh had drawn up a Châteauesque design, while Howard, Cauldwell & Morgan had devised an American colonial design.

Carnegie hired Babb, Cook & Willard as architects in March 1899. Carnegie was about to construct his mansion and garden by June 1899, and plans for the house were published in the Architectural Record the next month. The plans called for a four-story Dutch Colonial-style structure on 91st Street with an eastern wing and a terraced garden. Babb, Cook & Willard filed plans for the house that November. Several contractors submitted bids to build the house, and Charles T. Wills received the general contract in January 1900. A model of the mansion was displayed at the Architectural League of New York the same year. Louise Carnegie influenced many aspects of the mansion's design, having added a "winter garden", playroom, and nursery for her only child. He also contemplated erecting a 40-foot-tall (12 m) marble wall to the east, blocking views from Madison Avenue. Carnegie requested numerous revisions to the design, causing disputes between him and the architects, which Butler had to mediate. Carnegie hired Frederic Archer in May 1900 to design the mansion's organ. The organ was initially supposed to cost $16,000, but this price increased after Carnegie requested several alterations to the organ, including changes to its bass register.

In April 1901, the New York Large Tree Company began delivering around 30 mature trees to the site, some measuring up to 60 feet (18 m) tall and 17 inches (430 mm) in diameter. By then, the house was nearly completed and was surrounded by a wooden construction fence. Trees were delivered from Westchester County, New York, via a custom-made wagon pulled by six horses. One newspaper wrote that the trees were intended to block views of a nearby tavern from the house. The New York Large Tree Company placed a $161.40 lien on the property in September 1901 after Carnegie did not pay them. When the mansion was nearing completion in mid-1902, two hundred and fifty workers went on strike to protest low wages; the strike was resolved after less than a week. The mansion's cost was estimated at $1.5 million (equivalent to $55,817,000 in 2025) or $2.5 million (equivalent to $93,029,000 in 2025).

=== Carnegie use ===
The Carnegies moved into the house on December 12, 1902, arriving on an ocean liner from Skibo Castle. Louise's sister Stella Whitfield, who had lived with the couple since 1890, also moved into the house, living there until the 1910s. There were erroneous media reports that the house would be turned over to Carnegie's daughter Margaret. The Carnegies hosted their first event at the mansion, a housewarming party, the week after they moved in. The mansion did not include a garage, so Carnegie built a five-story, brick-and-marble parking garage nearby in 1905; that structure had space for five cars and also housed several servants. (Note: Since 1969, the Horace Mann School has occupied the garage.) In contrast to other houses on Fifth Avenue, the Carnegie Mansion was never popular as a site for social events.

==== 1900s and 1910s ====
In addition to serving as the Carnegies' city residence, the mansion was the headquarters of Carnegie's philanthropic ventures. In general, the Carnegie family stayed in the mansion from October to May. Carnegie typically spent his mornings working in the library and exercising; after an afternoon nap and a walk around Central Park, he hosted business visitors. The Carnegies may have employed up to 42 servants, although about 25 worked at the house simultaneously. Like other Gilded Age mansions, the Carnegie Mansion had numerous butlers, housekeepers, cooks, engineers, and garage workers; the Carnegies also had their own security force and secretaries. The mechanical systems alone were managed by a master engineer, three assistant engineers, and nine helpers. Carnegie hired organist Walter C. Gale to play the mansion's organ at breakfast every morning, as well as piper Angus MacPherson. Louise also involved herself in the general operations of the house.

Unlike other wealthy New Yorkers, Carnegie did not mingle with high society; instead, he preferred to invite politicians and intellectuals for dinner. The Carnegies hosted events such as their niece Nancy's wedding in 1905, their own 25th anniversary in 1912, Margaret's debutante ball in 1916, and annual reunions of Carnegie's business partners. Carnegie also invited journalists to the mansion every year for his birthday. In the dining room, the Carnegies entertained visitors such as the orator Booker T. Washington and the pianist Ignacy Jan Paderewski. The Carnegies sometimes asked dinner guests to sign the tablecloths and then had the signatures embroidered; Mark Twain, Marie Curie, and several U.S. presidents were among those who signed the family's tablecloths. Musical performances often took place in the main hall, and other major events took place in the picture gallery. Despite the large number of libraries that Carnegie had funded worldwide, he seldom used his personal library in the mansion; he also spent relatively little on art and largely decorated the picture room with paintings by living artists.

Carnegie began allowing local children to play in the mansion's garden in 1911, and Louise's brother Henry D. Whitfield designed a passageway between the house's conservatory and picture gallery in 1913. An anarchist unsuccessfully tried to bomb the mansion in 1915. Carnegie bought a wooden shack on the southeast corner of Fifth Avenue and 90th Street in 1917 to prevent an apartment building from being erected there. Following the onset of World War I, the Carnegies stopped traveling to Skibo Castle during the summers. The family instead obtained a summer house in Massachusetts; they continued to use the New York City mansion during the winter. Margaret Carnegie married Roswell Miller at the mansion in 1919, and Andrew Carnegie died later the same year.

==== 1920s to 1940s ====
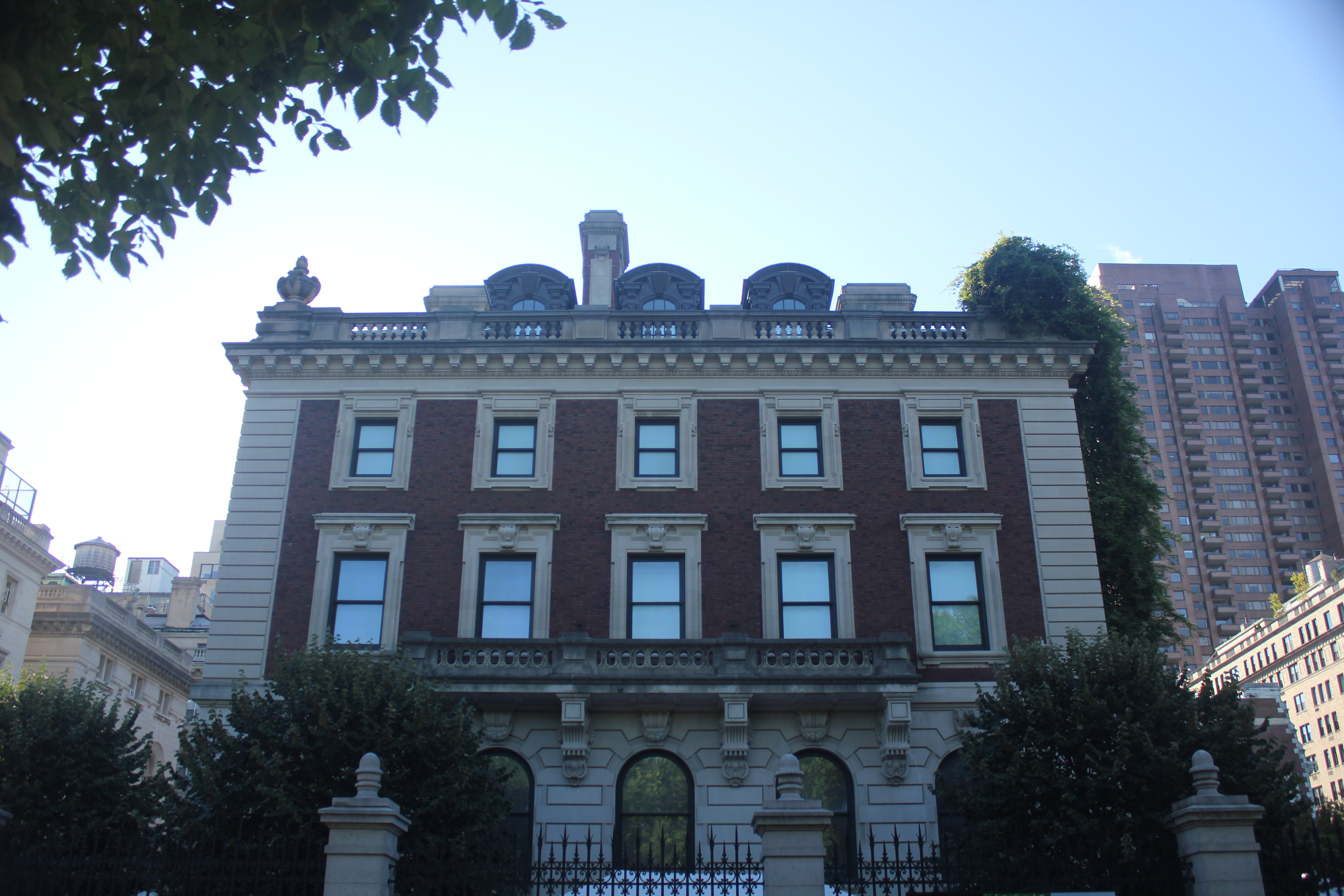
View from Fifth Avenue

Following Carnegie's death, the mansion was valued at $977,833 (equivalent to $15,715,000 in 2025). Louise Carnegie bought George McAlpin's house at 9 East 90th Street for her daughter and son-in-law for $250,000 in May 1920, and the house was renovated for the Millers at the end of 1920. The Millers furnished their house with some of the furniture from the Carnegies' Massachusetts home. The Carnegie and Miller houses were internally connected so Louise Carnegie could visit her daughter and son-in-law every day. After Margaret moved out, Louise lived in the mansion with her 14 servants.

The New York state government attempted to charge Louise a $55,000 inheritance tax after her husband's death, but the New York Court of Appeals ruled in 1922 that the tax did not need to be paid, as the Carnegies had co-owned the mansion. Later the same year, the Appellate Division of the New York Supreme Court found that the legislation creating the inheritance tax violated the Constitution of New York, a decision upheld by the Court of Appeals. Louise Carnegie obtained an option on 11 houses across the street from the mansion in 1923. The next year, she sold the lot on the southeast corner of Fifth Avenue and 90th Street to the Church of the Heavenly Rest, subject to restrictions on the church's height and use. Louise also sold an adjacent lot at 2 East 91st Street to the Spence School in 1928. Almus Pratt Evans designed a "garden entrance", connecting the Carnegie Mansion and the Miller House, in the same year. Louise added a small play area for her grandchildren in the garden.

Between the 1920s and the 1940s, Louise Carnegie continued to host various events such as benefits and organ recitals, and her grandchildren also came to the house. Events included the 1927 marriage of the Carnegies' niece Louise Whitfield, as well as sewing classes, student club meetings, parties in the mansion's garden, and concerts. Meanwhile, development in the area had increased following Andrew Carnegie's death. The Carnegie Mansion and the houses across 91st Street had been restricted to residential use, but the restriction was lifted in 1934 when the Kahn House across the street was sold to the Convent of the Sacred Heart, a girls' school. The mansion remained Louise Carnegie's residence in the 1940s, when The New York Times wrote that her continued occupancy of the house "may come as something of a surprise to many persons". The conservatory's roof, which was blacked out during World War II, was not restored until the 1970s.

Louise died in June 1946 and bequeathed the mansion to the Carnegie Corporation of New York. Following Louise Carnegie's death, the mansion remained largely intact, and it was maintained by the family steward Alexander Morrison and a skeleton crew. The Carnegie Corporation had no need to occupy the house, and, in late 1946, it offered to lease the building to the United Nations as a clubhouse and office space. The proposal called for the house to contain the United Nations Secretariat's offices in addition to clubrooms. The Personal Parcel Service, which sent food around the world, occupied the first-floor art gallery room in the late 1940s. As late as 1948, the Carnegie Corporation was still offering to lease the house to the UN, but ultimately the UN never moved to the mansion.

=== Columbia use ===
==== Lease and renovation ====
In January 1949, the Carnegie Corporation agreed to lease both the Carnegie Mansion and the Miller home to the New York School of Social Work for 21 years, with an option to renew the lease. Edgar I. Williams, whose brother was the writer and poet William Carlos Williams, designed a $140,000 renovation of the building. The Carnegie Corporation submitted alteration plans to the New York City Department of Buildings on February 11, and the building was closed for renovations two weeks later. The Community Service Society of New York funded the work.

The kitchen became a cafeteria, and the picture gallery became a lecture hall. The original walnut staircase was placed in storage and replaced by an enclosed stairway. The second floor bedrooms were turned into classrooms, the third floor became administrative offices, and the fourth floor became faculty offices. Although Carnegie's library remained in use as the school's library room, the secretary's office and drawing room were adapted into stacks and a reading room, respectively. The school upgraded the house to meet fire codes, added partition walls, and installed brighter lighting. The Carnegie Corporation requested that the organ on the first floor remain in place, and the study, library, and one portrait of Carnegie also remained as-is. The School of Social Work officially moved into the mansion on October 5, 1949. A plaque, commemorating the mansion as Carnegie's former residence, was installed outside the house the same month.

==== 1950s and 1960s ====
The writer Heather Ewing stated that the house and garden were "a fortress of peace from the outside realities" and helped inspire the School of Social Work's students. The New York School for Nursery Years, an institution affiliated with the School of Social Work, moved into 9 East 90th Street in October 1954. Although the School of Social Work did not pay rent, by the mid-1950s it was spending $50,000 annually just on the house's operation. The school also paid $5,000 per year to maintain the mansion's garden, as the plants had to be replaced frequently due to neighborhood pollution. The School of Social Work found that it could not reduce the garden's annual budget to less than $4,000; to defray costs, it began selling keys to the garden for an annual fee in 1955.

The School of Social Work became part of Columbia University in 1959 and announced that it would move from the mansion to Columbia's main campus in Morningside Heights "as soon as possible". The School of Social Work's relocation plans prompted concerns about the mansion's future, especially as other mansions on Fifth Avenue's "Millionaires' Row" were being demolished. The School of Social Work also declined to renew the New York School for Nursery Years' lease of 9 East 90th Street, which was set to expire in 1964; the School of Nursery Years moved to the Carnegies' old garage. The Carnegie Corporation notified the School of Social Work in January 1967 that the school would have to leave the mansion within two years. At the time, Columbia was still raising $5 million to erect a new building for the School of Social Work in Morningside Heights.

=== Smithsonian use ===
As early as October 1967, the Smithsonian Institution was negotiating to lease the mansion from the Carnegie Corporation. Although several other entities had expressed interest in the building, the Carnegie Corporation's secretary said it was almost certain the Smithsonian would get the lease. The Smithsonian's secretary Sidney Dillon Ripley leased the mansion in September 1969, with plans to move its Cooper-Hewitt Museum there. The museum was to pay $1 annually for 16 years, and the Smithsonian received an option to buy the house after 1981.

==== Conversion into museum ====
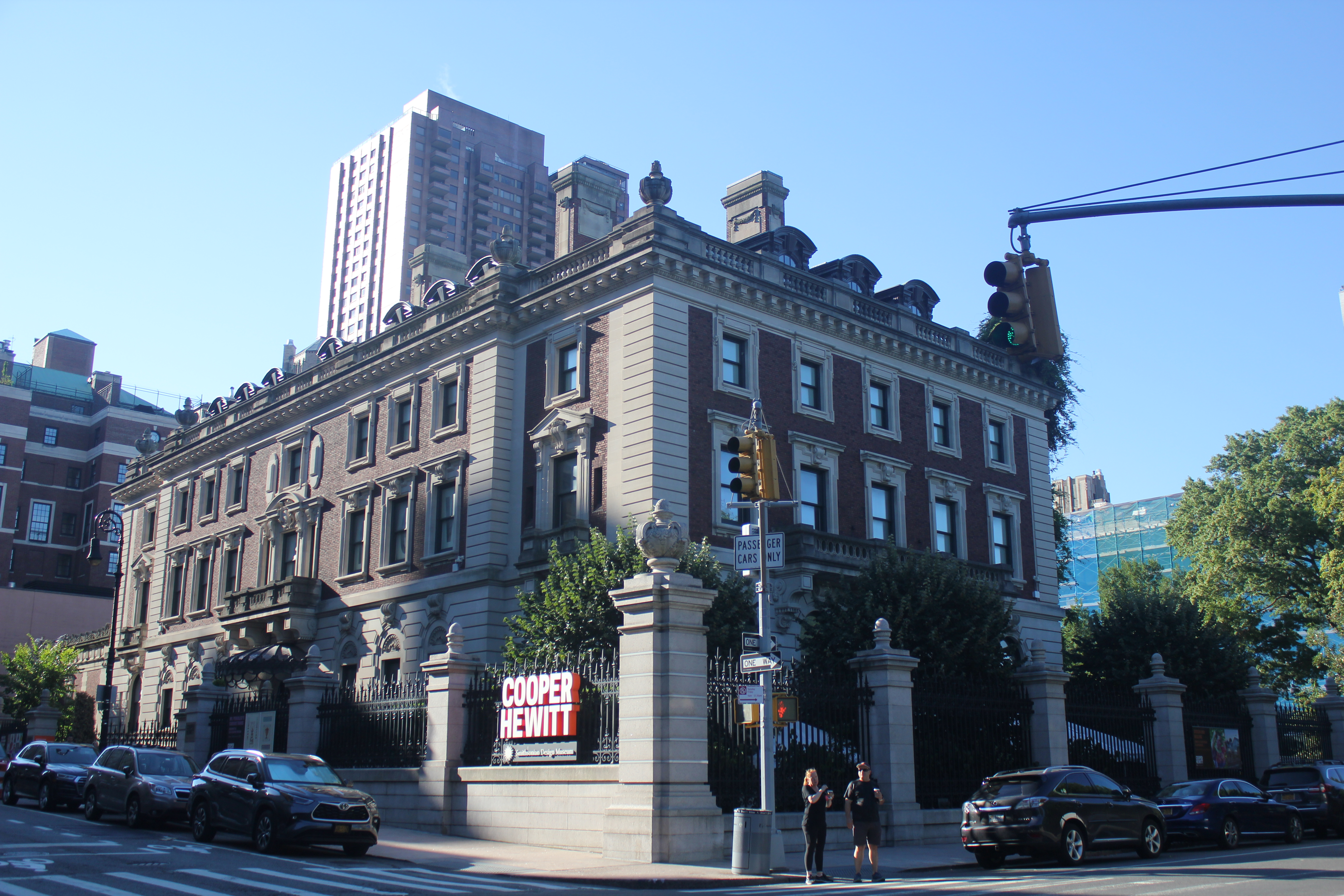
The mansion as seen from 91st Street and Fifth Avenue

The Cooper-Hewitt's director Lisa Taylor predicted that the museum's 85,000-item collection could be moved to the mansion by 1971, but the School of Social Work did not move out of the mansion until that year. The Cooper-Hewitt moved its offices to the Miller House, and it hosted some events at the building before its official reopening, such as a wine-tasting in 1971 and a design show in 1974. Taylor initially had difficulties raising money for renovations because the Smithsonian rented, rather than owned, the mansion. The Carnegie Corporation gifted the Carnegie and Miller houses to the Smithsonian Institution in 1972; at the time, the mansion was valued at $8 million. This gift allowed the Cooper-Hewitt to begin raising money. By the beginning of 1973, the museum's collection had been relocated into the mansion's ancillary spaces, and local residents were using the house's garden.

Architectural firm Hardy Holzman Pfeiffer Associates (HHPA) designed a renovation of the house, while construction firm New Again was the general contractor. The renovation cost $2.5 million, which was partially funded by donations and auctions of jewelry and artwork. Although Hugh Hardy of HHPA did not want to restore the house to its exact appearance in the 1900s, he hired Italian craftsmen to restore the old architectural details. The conservatory was renovated, the grand stairs were reopened, and an elevator was installed. Fixtures such as smoke detectors and lights were integrated into the existing design, while other features were covered up, repainted, or repurposed. Bedrooms were combined to create a single large gallery and several smaller ones. In addition to the interior work, the museum planted 30,000 tulips in the mansion's garden. Carnegie's old desk (which was so large that part of the mansion's wall had to be removed) was placed into storage, and the organ in the main hall was removed to Roslyn Harbor. The museum, anticipating a half-million annual visitors, initially planned a new entrance and additional stairways or elevators, but these plans were scrapped.

Following delays, the Cooper-Hewitt Museum soft opened within the mansion in March 1976, and the museum opened to the public on October 7, 1976. Some of the permanent exhibitions were still being moved into the house at the time. The exhibition spaces initially occupied the first and second floors, while the third floor contained the museum's library. Museum officials planned to host contemporary exhibitions and other events at 9 East 90th Street. Because of monetary constraints, some features, such as a missing Tiffany chandelier and a broken skylight, could not be restored in advance of the museum's opening. In addition, Taylor and renovation architect Hugh Hardy planned to convert the mansion's basements into exhibit space once the museum had raised more money. There was also to be a basement auditorium, and 9 East 90th Street was to have received new galleries, classrooms, and screening rooms.

==== 1980s and 1990s ====
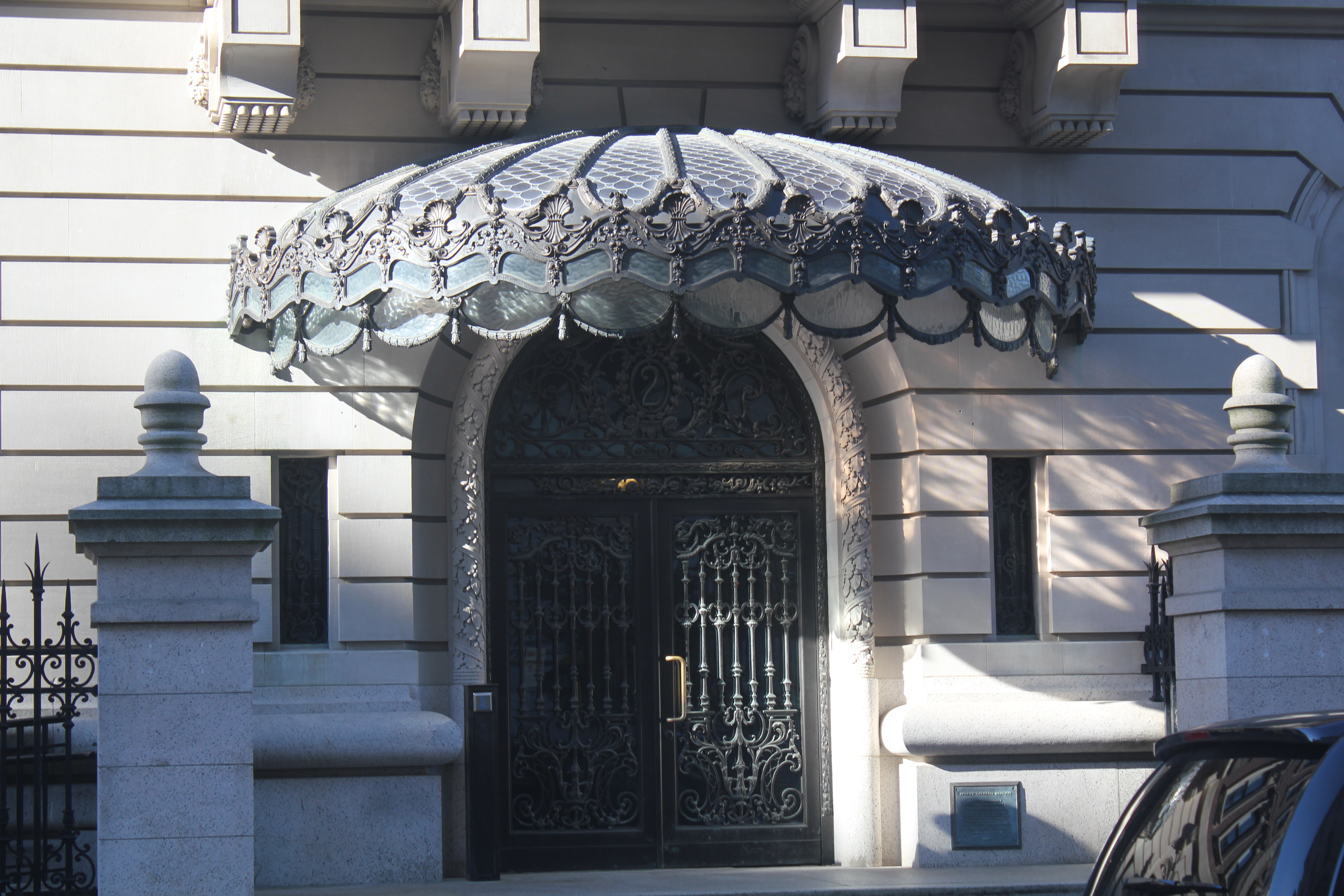
Entrance to the mansion

The Cooper-Hewitt Museum saw 250,000 visitors within a year of its reopening at the Carnegie Mansion. In 1979, the Arthur Ross Foundation offered a $100,000 grant to the Cooper-Hewitt to restore the mansion's garden. Lisa Taylor described the Carnegie Mansion as ideal for the museum's exhibitions because the museum's objects could be "shown here in a human scale" instead of in a massive gallery. The Cooper-Hewitt celebrated the tenth anniversary of its occupancy of the mansion in 1987. The museum had still not raised enough money for the second phase of renovations. HHPA devised plans for a new structure to replace the museum's staff parking lot. This plan would cost $23 million, of which half would be provided by Congress and half raised through private sources, although Congress had not agreed to provide funding. The mansion was too small, and its space too constrained, to accommodate some of the museum's exhibitions in full. There was not enough space for the gift shop, which occupied one of the mansion's halls. The museum also had no loading dock, and workers had to walk around the block every time they wanted to transport objects between the main mansion and 9 East 90th Street.

The Smithsonian bought the McAlpin-Minot House at 11 East 90th Street in 1989 for $3.6 million, and it connected that house to the Carnegie Mansion and 9 East 90th Street. By 1991, the roof was leaking heavily, prompting the museum to begin repairing it for $2 million; the old roof dormers were restored and given to other museums. The Cooper-Hewitt also said it would create a master plan for the garden and the staff parking lot. Dianne H. Pilgrim, who had succeeded Taylor as the Cooper-Hewitt's director, hired James Stewart Polshek Partners to devise plans for a further renovation of the Cooper-Hewitt buildings. At the time, the mansion was not fully accessible to people with disabilities; Pilgrim, who used a wheelchair, had to use a service entrance. The project was initially planned to cost $10 million, but Smithsonian secretary Michael Heyman placed the plans on hold in late 1994 due to cost overruns. The budget ultimately increased to $20 million; this consisted of a $13 million allocation from the Smithsonian and $7 million from private sources. One major donation came from interior designer Agnes Bourne, who sold the San Francisco house where she had resided for 11 months, and then donated $2 million to the museum.

Pilgrim announced in May 1995 that the mansion's exhibition galleries would close for renovation, and the renovation commenced that August. The exhibit spaces were closed, though the mansion continued to host the museum's workshops and programs. The 91st Street entrance was rebuilt, and elevators were installed to make the mansion and the 90th Street townhouses fully accessible. A two-story connection between the mansion and the two townhouses was also developed, along with a "design resources center" in the two townhouses. The work also involved rearrangement of study areas and storage rooms, in addition to refurbished mechanical systems. The conservatory was repaired, display cases were relocated, creaking floors were fixed, and rooms were repainted. The mansion's first-floor exhibit space reopened in September 1996. Work on the passageway and design resources center continued through 1997, and the renovation was not completed until 1998.

==== 2000s to present ====
Even after the expansion, the mansion and townhouses lacked an auditorium or sufficient storage areas. The museum's archives spanned 600 square feet (56 m^{2}), and it had only 8,000 square feet (740 m^{2}) of gallery space. As such, the Cooper-Hewitt had to close galleries every time a new exhibit was set up, and it had limited flexibility to present shows from other design museums. There was no freight elevator, and all exhibits had to be brought into the house through the main entrance. Paul W. Thompson, who succeeded Pilgrim in 2000, initially did not plan to expand the mansion and townhouses, but he changed his mind after the museum experienced staffing, budgetary, and exhibit shortages. The museum announced plans in mid-2003 to rearrange galleries, and several members of the museum's board indicated the same year that they would host a master plan competition, in advance of an expansion. During the mid-2000s, the museum added an admission desk to the mansion and built an 800-square-foot (74 m^{2}) digital-design gallery in the basement. The Target National Design Education Center, comprising a library, studio, and lecture room, opened on the mansion's ground floor in 2006.

News media reported in February 2005 that the Cooper-Hewitt was considering a $75 million proposal by Beyer Blinder Belle to construct three basement stories under the mansion's garden, thereby nearly quadrupling gallery space to 30,000 square feet (2,800 m^{2}). The basement levels would also have contained a restaurant, conservation rooms, and exhibit-preparation areas. Beyer Blinder Belle proposed a revised plan in 2006. The $25 million plan entailed moving the museum's offices and library to the 90th Street townhouses and expanding the gallery space in the mansion itself to 18,000 square feet (1,700 m^{2}). A freight elevator and restaurant would also be added. That year, the museum launched a capital campaign to raise funds for the renovation and the museum's endowment; it had raised $21.5 million by April 2007. The Cooper-Hewitt hired Gluckman Mayner Architects to design the renovation, along with Beyer Blinder Belle as preservation consultants. By October 2008, the cost of the project had increased to $64 million. The Smithsonian began renovating the two townhouses on 90th Street, with plans to relocate the museum's offices from the mansion to the townhouses.

The mansion's exhibition galleries closed for renovations in July 2011, and the Cooper-Hewitt had raised $54 million by the end of that December, allowing work on the mansion to commence. Thirteen firms helped redesign the mansion, including Diller Scofidio + Renfro, which redesigned the galleries. In addition to the new gallery and relocated offices, the project involved restoring architectural details and adding a freight entrance, a cafe, an enlarged gift shop, and restrooms. The restaurant was scrapped because it would have cost $7 million to dig into the bedrock. Parts of the library were moved to New Jersey to make way for the new gallery. The project's scope increased as work progressed, and the renovation cost ultimately increased to $91 million. The New York City government contributed $14.3 million to the project, and additional funds came from the museum's endowment.

The museum reopened on December 12, 2014, the 112th anniversary of the Carnegies' move into the house. Additional renovations to the Arthur Ross Terrace and Garden were completed in 2015. The same year, the U.S. Green Building Council gave the mansion and the two 90th Street townhouses a LEED Silver green-building certification. The mansion has continued to host the museum's exhibits, collections, and events through the 2020s.

== Impact ==
=== Reception ===
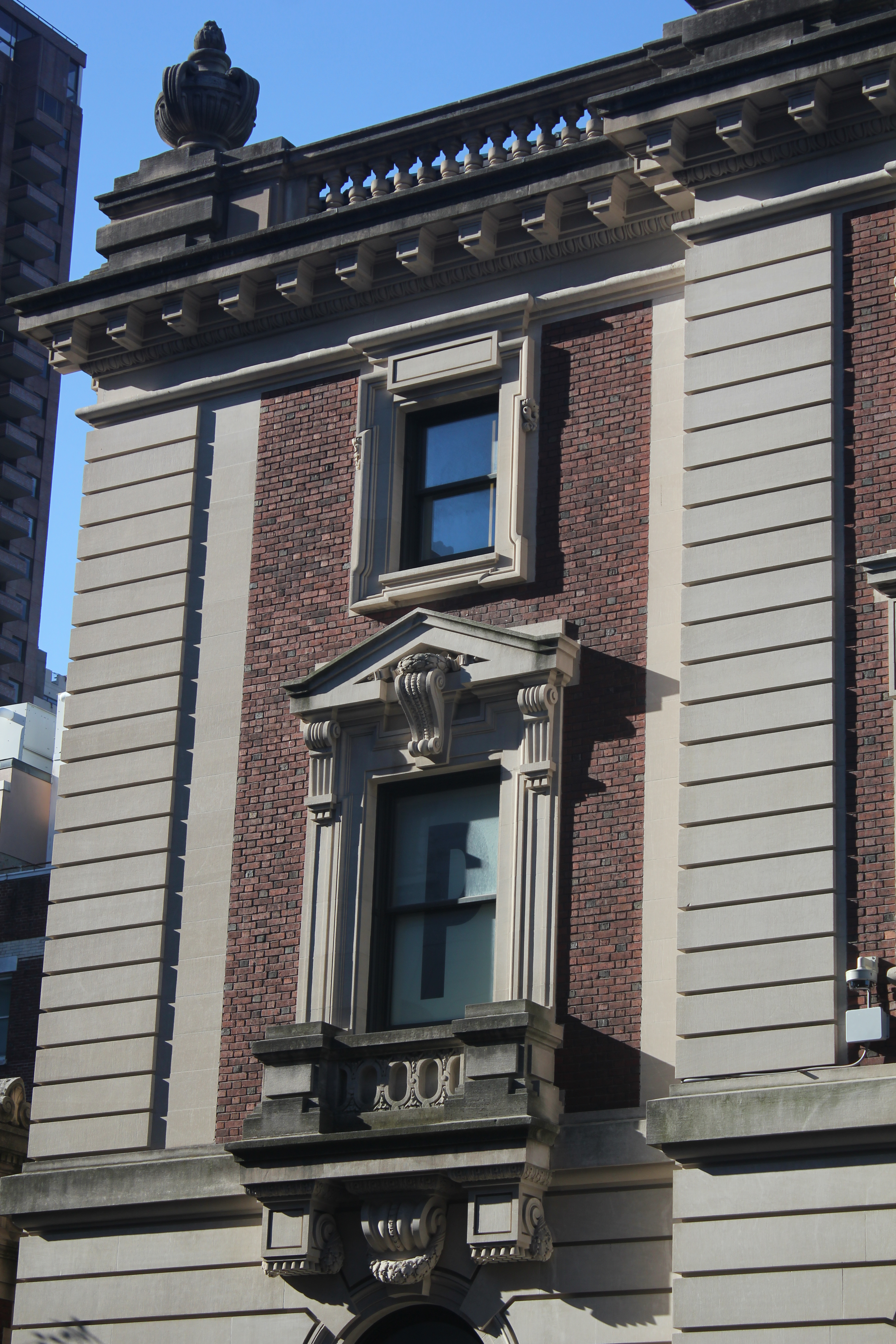
Windows at the end of the 91st Street elevation of the facade

Although Carnegie had intended for the mansion to be relatively plain from the start, the New-York Tribune reported in 1901 that "many people are disappointed by the plainness of the house". A writer for the Democrat and Chronicle said the same year that "the style of the French Renaissance is side by side with Gothic architecture, while a Colonial front looks strangely enough beside a structure that might have been lifted bodily from a street in Rome or Florence". The Atlanta Constitution compared the mansion's 70-by-180-foot (21 by 55 m) dimensions with the one-and-a-half-story homestead where Carnegie was born. The Buffalo Enquirer wrote that, despite the paucity of exterior detail, the interior was as elaborate as the William A. Clark House, which itself was compared to the Metropolitan Museum of Art's building. A writer for Brooklyn Life praised Carnegie as "the first millionaire [on Fifth Avenue] who had the courage to have a yard", while another writer, in The Construction News, said the house's garden "makes it noteworthy among all New York houses". When the mansion was completed, The New York Times compared it with the lavish houses of William Clark, Charles Yerkes, and George Crocker, all located further south on Fifth Avenue.

A decade after the mansion's completion, The Baltimore Sun wrote that the Carnegie Mansion's garden was "the only one of really respectable size on Fifth Avenue". A journalist named Lucy Cleveland wrote in 1910 that she was in "a kind of awe" over the mechanical floors. A writer for The Buffalo Times wrote in 1927 that the Carnegie Mansion "has always seemed a home, rather than a show-place", as the Henry Clay Frick House and the Vanderbilt family's mansions further south on Fifth Avenue were. By the late 1920s, a New York Times writer described the Carnegie and Frick mansions as the "largest and most picturesque of the remaining homes" on Fifth Avenue, as many mansions on the avenue were being razed and replaced with apartments. Architectural critic Henry Hope Reed Jr. wrote in 1961 that the house was architecturally "something of a disappointment" compared to the Kahn, Burden, and Hammond houses across 91st Street, particularly criticizing the large site as "hardly suitable for a large urban dwelling".

Wolf Von Eckardt, a critic for The Washington Post, wrote in 1973 that the School of Social Work's renovations had made "the place look as much as a slum as possible". Amei Wallach of Newsday said the mansion was "grand rather than beautiful" in 1976, and Ada Louise Huxtable of the Times similarly said that the mansion "is substantial rather than splendid". Huxtable said the mansion's small scale meant that the Cooper-Hewitt's exhibits "will not have to compete with overwhelming grandeur", while Thomas B. Hess said the mansion had been "skillfully, tactfully, if coolly renovated to something of its old grandeur". Sarah Booth Conroy of The Washington Post said in 1976 that the house "has rather the air of a counting-house: square, secure, stodgy but enormously ornate". In 1981, a writer for the Christian Science Monitor described the contrast between the house's use of heavy oak wood, its "delicate architectural details in smaller rooms, and green plants in the conservatory".

After the 1990s renovation, Washington Post writer Benjamin Forgey said that the passageway from the mansion to the 90th Street townhouses was functional but bland, and he said the original mansion's interiors, while "historic artifacts in their own right, are not and will never be sympathetic settings for many types of exhibitions". Herbert Muschamp wrote that the mansion was a "monument to Andrew Carnegie's taste for dark, carved wood" rather than an appropriate setting for the Cooper-Hewitt Museum. In part because Carnegie had bought the surrounding lots and resold them only to people who would build similar mansions, the historian Christopher Gray wrote in 2014 that the house helped form one of the "grandest blocks" in the city. In 2015, after the Cooper-Hewitt's renovation of the mansion, the Financial Times wrote that "the architecture's splendour is meant to be only a backdrop for" the objects in the museum's collection.

=== Effects on development ===
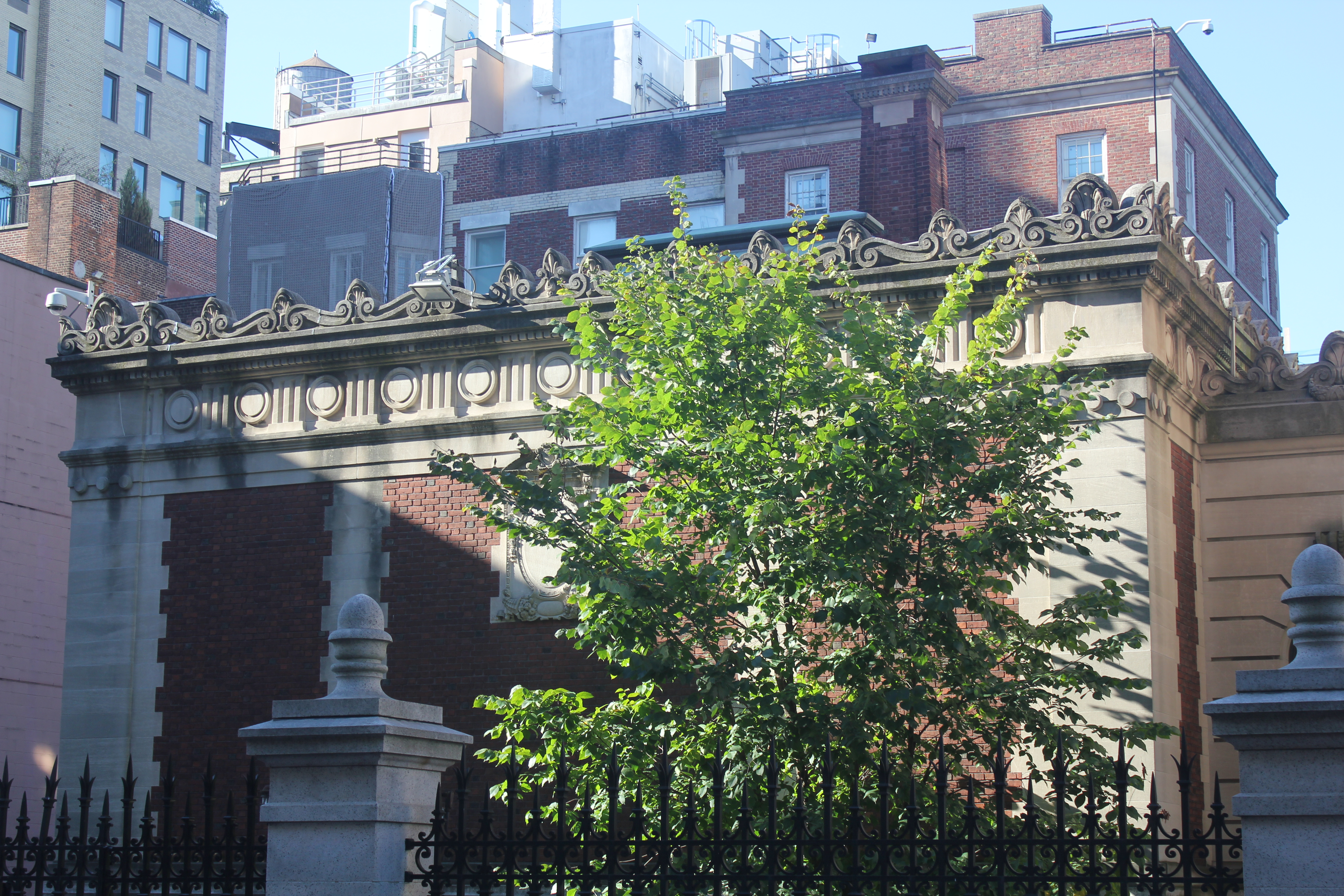
Service wing, seen from the east

The mansion's construction spurred large amounts of high-end development in the neighborhood. The New York Sun wrote that Carnegie's 1898 acquisition of the site had caused the prices of vacant land in the neighborhood to increase, while The New York Times wrote that the purchase had moved the boundary of Fifth Avenue's Millionaires' Row northward. Although there was a "mad scramble" for land on Fifth Avenue south of 90th Street after Carnegie's purchase, there was also demand for sites on the avenue from 92nd to 100th Street. Land values on the section of Fifth Avenue near Carnegie's house doubled from 1898 to the mid-1910s. The New York World wrote in 1912 that "Andrew Carnegie's palace [...] is believed to mark the northern boundary of fashion's realm". The presence of the mansion, combined with Carnegie's purchase and selective resale of the surrounding lots, contributed to the growth of Carnegie Hill. The surrounding area, once known as Observatory Hill or Prospect Hill, became known as Carnegie Hill after Andrew Carnegie finished his mansion.

Only two other mansions in Manhattan occupied an entire blockfront as the Carnegie Mansion did: the Henry Clay Frick House on Fifth Avenue and the Charles M. Schwab House on the Upper West Side. The industrialist Henry Clay Frick had developed his house specifically to compete with the Carnegie Mansion. Industrialists including Thomas F. Ryan, James B. A. Haggin, William B. Leeds, Daniel G. Reid, and Henry Phipps Jr. also built their mansions on the northern section of Fifth Avenue after Carnegie's house was completed. Other wealthy individuals moved north of the Carnegie Mansion, including Otto Kahn, James W. Gerard, Willard Dickerman Straight (at 94th Street and Fifth Avenue), Edith Fabbri (at 7 East 95th Street), and René Sergent.

=== Landmark designations ===
The Carnegie Mansion was added to the National Register of Historic Places in 1966 as a National Historic Landmark, marking it as a site that adds "exceptional value to the nation". It was also added to the New York State Register of Historic Places on June 23, 1980.

The New York City Landmarks Preservation Commission (LPC) first proposed the Carnegie Hill Historic District in 1966, which would have included both the Carnegie Mansion and 9 East 90th Street. The Carnegie Mansion would also have been designated as an individual landmark. In April 1970, the LPC proposed designating the Carnegie Mansion and 9 East 90th Street as separate individual landmarks. Although the LPC designated the Carnegie Mansion as an individual landmark in February 1974, it was not initially part of the Carnegie Hill Historic District, which was designated the same year. Furthermore, due to opposition from Sidney Dillon Ripley, only the Carnegie Mansion was designated as an individual landmark. The land under 9 East 90th Street was also protected as the buildings shared a land lot, but the designation did not prevent unauthorized changes to that house. When the Carnegie Hill Historic District was expanded in 1993, both structures were included in the expanded district.

=== Media ===
The Carnegie Mansion has been shown in several films and TV series. In the 1955 film Daddy Long Legs, the 1981 film Arthur, and the 1980s TV series The Two Mrs. Grenvilles, the mansion was depicted as one of the characters' residences. The 1976 films The Next Man and Marathon Man both used the house as a stand-in for an embassy. In addition, the 1972 film The Anderson Tapes, the 1973 film Godspell, the 1986 film Jumpin' Jack Flash, the 1987 film 84 Charing Cross Road, and the 1988 film Working Girl used the mansion as a filming location, as did the 1980s miniseries Master of the Game and I'll Take Manhattan. The Cooper-Hewitt Museum presented an exhibition about the mansion's history inside the mansion itself in 1977.

== See also ==
- List of Gilded Age mansions
- List of largest houses in the United States
- List of National Historic Landmarks in New York City
- List of New York City Designated Landmarks in Manhattan from 59th to 110th Streets
- National Register of Historic Places listings in Manhattan from 59th to 110th Streets
