= Cooper Hewitt, Smithsonian Design Museum =

Design museum in Manhattan, New York

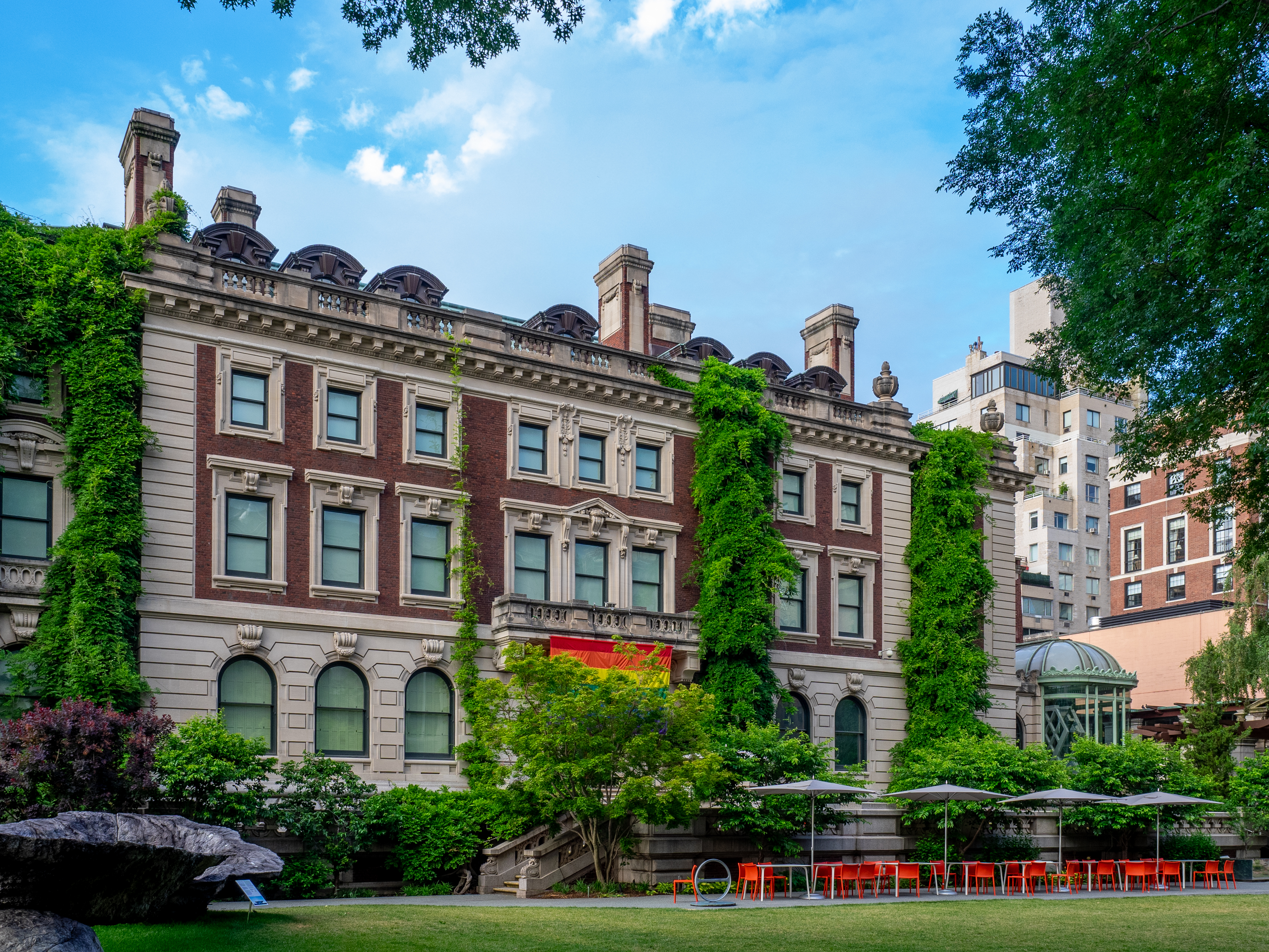
- Garden and entrance to Cooper Hewitt
- Interactive fullscreen map
- Established: 1897
- Location: Andrew Carnegie Mansion; Manhattan, New York, United States
- Coordinates: 40°47′05″N 73°57′29″W
- Public transit access: Bus: M1, M2, M3, M4, M86, M96, M106; Subway: trains at 86th Street, trains at 96th Street
- Website: cooperhewitt.org

Cooper Hewitt, Smithsonian Design Museum is a design museum at the Andrew Carnegie Mansion in Manhattan, New York City, along the Upper East Side's Museum Mile. It is one of nineteen Smithsonian Institution museums and one of three Smithsonian facilities located in New York City, along with the National Museum of the American Indian's George Gustav Heye Center in Bowling Green and the Archives of American Art New York Research Center in the Flatiron District. Unlike other Smithsonian museums, Cooper Hewitt charges an admissions fee. Its collections and exhibitions explore design aesthetic and creativity from throughout the United States' history.

== History ==
=== Early history ===
In 1895, several granddaughters of the politician and businessman Peter Cooper—Sarah Cooper Hewitt, Eleanor Garnier Hewitt and Amy Hewitt Green—asked the Cooper Union college in New York City for space to create a Museum for the Arts of Decoration. The museum would take its inspiration from the Musée des Arts Décoratifs, Paris and would serve as a place for Cooper Union students and professional designers to study decorative arts collections. Cooper Union's trustees provided the fourth floor of the Foundation Building. It opened in 1897 as the "Cooper Union Museum for the Arts of Decoration". The museum was free and open to the public three days a week. The Hewitt sisters donated some of the objects that they owned to the museum.

Early in the museum's history, the Cooper Union Museum received three textile collections from J. P. Morgan and drawings by Giovanni Baglione. The three sisters served as directors of the Museum until Sarah Cooper Hewitt died in 1930. After her death, four directors were appointed to run the museum. Constance P. Hare served as chair. In 1938, Edwin S. Burdell became the director of the Cooper Union. The museum became his responsibility. The board of directors was abolished and an advisory council was established. Through the mid-20th century, the museum's collection came to include furniture, wallpapers, leatherwork, millinery, ceramics, jewelry, textiles, and media such as drawings and prints. The museum had begun to decline by the 1950s and 1960s, in part because it was in a hard-to-find location, and Cooper Union students preferred modern art over the museum's dated collections.

==== Threats of closure ====
By the 1960s, the museum and college started to distance themselves from one another in regards to programming. Other departments of the Cooper Union were making financial demands. The Cooper Union announced in June 1963 that it was considering shuttering the museum completely, and the museum closed on July 3, 1963. In explaining the closure, the college said that the museum was far from other visitor attractions, the museum space was too small, and it was seeing declining use. Cooper Union officials also said their endowment could not fund the museum's continued operations. This prompted concerns that the museum's collection could be dispersed. A Committee to Save the Cooper Union Museum, formed by Henry Francis Du Pont, threatened to sue to prevent the museum from closing. The committee requested that the Cooper Union's trustees split the museum off from the college's main operations. Another organization, the Greenwich Village Committee, was also formed in July 1963 to try to prevent the proposed relocation of the museum's collections.

The museum reopened September 16, 1963, with its future still uncertain. That November, the Cooper Union accepted the American Association of Museums' offer to conduct a study on the future of the museum. The Metropolitan Museum of Art, which was located nearby, offered to take over all of the museum's holdings. By 1965, the Smithsonian Institution had begun negotiating to take over the museum from the Cooper Union. At the time, the institution was rapidly expanding the number of artworks and artifacts in its other museums.

=== Smithsonian operation ===
==== 1960s and 1970s ====
On October 9, 1967, Smithsonian Secretary S. Dillon Ripley and Daniel Maggin, the chair of the board of trustees, signed an agreement turning over the collection and library of the museum to the Smithsonian. As part of the agreement, the museum was to stay in New York City permanently and would remain in the Cooper Union's Foundation Building for three years. Even before it had finalized its acquisition, the Smithsonian was negotiating to lease the Andrew Carnegie Mansion on Manhattan's Upper East Side as the collection's new home. The mansion was five times as large as the museum's Cooper Union space. The New York Supreme Court approved the agreement on May 14, 1968. The museum was officially transferred to the Smithsonian on July 1, becoming the Cooper-Hewitt Museum of Design, and Richard T. Wunder was named as the director. Wunder planned to obtain objects from around the world. Despite being part of the Smithsonian Institution, the Cooper Hewitt still did not have enough cash to sustain its own operations.

In 1969, it was renamed again to the Cooper-Hewitt Museum of Decorative Arts and Design. Ripley leased the Carnegie Mansion from the Carnegie Corporation of New York in September 1969. Lisa Taylor became the Cooper-Hewitt's director that October, the first woman to serve in that position. The museum, which was the first Smithsonian museum outside of Washington, D.C., moved to its home at the Carnegie Mansion in 1970. The museum obtained the mansion outright in 1972. During the early 1970s, the museum was temporarily closed while it relocated from the Foundation Building to the Carnegie Mansion. During this time, it hosted exhibits at venues such as the Seventh Regiment Armory. By the middle of the decade, the collection had grown to 250 pieces of furniture, 500 glass objects, 1,500 ceramic objects, 6,000 wallpaper samples, 18,000 textile samples, and 30,000 drawings. The museum had 35 paid staff and 72 volunteers by 1976, and it received $258,000 annually in federal funding. In addition, the museum planned to raise money through events, donations, and membership fees.

A soft opening for the museum took place in May 1976. The museum opened to the public on October 7, 1976, (Note: The Cooper-Hewitt website gives date of opening as October 6, 1976. Torch, October 1976, gives date as October 7, 1976, which is corroborated by other media sources from that time.) with the exhibition "MAN transFORMs". Other museums around the city hosted exhibitions to celebrate the Cooper-Hewitt's opening. Taylor and renovation architect Hugh Hardy planned to convert the mansion's basements into exhibit space, and they also planned a new auditorium, galleries, classrooms, and screening rooms. A conservation laboratory was opened in July 1978. The Samuel H. Kress Foundation funded the lab and it focuses on textile and paper conservation. At the time of the Cooper-Hewitt's reopening, it was the only museum in the U.S. that was dedicated exclusively to design.

==== 1980s and 1990s ====
The Cooper-Hewitt launched a master's degree program in conjunction with the Parsons School of Design in 1982. Under Taylor's leadership, the museum also began offering additional educational programs both for adults and for children. In the eight years after the Cooper-Hewitt reopened, it hosted over 100 temporary exhibitions. Lisa Taylor announced her retirement in 1987, and the Cooper-Hewitt celebrated the tenth anniversary of its occupancy of the Carnegie Mansion shortly thereafter. At the time, in contrast to most Smithsonian museums, the Cooper-Hewitt relied on the Smithsonian for only one-third of its annual budget. Dianne H. Pilgrim became the director in 1988, and the museum was again renamed to Cooper-Hewitt, National Design Museum that year. According to Pilgrim, the name change was intended to reflect the Cooper-Hewitt's purpose as a "design museum" that focused on the process of design, rather than a "museum of design" that focused on objects.

The Smithsonian bought the McAlpin-Minot House at 11 East 90th Street in 1989 for $3.6 million, and it connected that house to the Carnegie Mansion and 9 East 90th Street. An archive of African American designs was created at the museum in 1991. Pilgrim hired James Stewart Polshek Partners to devise plans for a further renovation of the Cooper-Hewitt buildings. The project was initially planned to cost $10 million, but Smithsonian secretary Michael Heyman placed the plans on hold in late 1994 due to cost overruns. The budget ultimately increased to $20 million; this consisted of a $13 million allocation from the Smithsonian and $7 million from private sources. The museum's logo was changed in late 1994 to emphasize the word "design".

Pilgrim announced in May 1995 that the exhibition galleries in the Carnegie Mansion would close for renovation, and the renovation commenced that August. The Carnegie Mansion's first-floor exhibit space reopened in September 1996, Work on the passageway and design resources center continued through 1997, and the renovation was not completed until 1998.

==== 2000s ====
Pilgrim retired from the museum in 2000, and Paul W. Thompson was named as the new director later that year. At the time of Thompson's appointment, the New York Times described the Carnegie Mansion as "an almost impossible venue for staging exhibitions on modern design" because the mansion was so much smaller than other museum buildings. Upon becoming the museum's director, Thompson sought to display modern design pieces at the Cooper-Hewitt. Thompson expanded the museum's board of trustees from 18 to 23 members, and the amount each trustee was expected to donate was increased from $10,000 to $25,000. He also planned to increase visitor numbers by one-third, to 200,000. Following the September 11 attacks, the Smithsonian ordered the Cooper-Hewitt to downsize, and Thompson eliminated four senior staff positions in June 2002, a move that prompted complaints from employees. In addition, over a dozen senior staff members resigned during 2001 and 2002, citing dissatisfaction with the work culture. Museum staff told The New York Times that passersby often did not know of the museum's existence or assumed it was affiliated with the Spence School on the same city block.

Thompson originally did not want to expand the museum, but he changed his mind after the museum experienced staffing, budgetary, and exhibit shortages. The museum announced plans in mid-2003 to rearrange galleries, and several members of the museum's board indicated the same year that they would host a master plan competition, in advance of an expansion. News media reported in February 2005 that the Cooper-Hewitt was considering a $75 million proposal by Beyer Blinder Belle to expand the museum buildings. The basement levels would also have contained a restaurant, conservation rooms, and exhibit-preparation areas. Beyer Blinder Belle proposed a revised plan in 2006, which was to cost $25 million. That year, the museum launched a capital campaign to raise funds for the renovation and the museum's endowment; it had raised $21.5 million by April 2007.

The Cooper-Hewitt hired Gluckman Mayner Architects to design the renovation, along with Beyer Blinder Belle as preservation consultants. By October 2008, the cost of the project had increased to $64 million. The Smithsonian began renovating the two townhouses on 90th Street in 2008, with plans to relocate the museum's offices from the mansion to the townhouses. In July 2009, Thompson left the museum to become the rector of the Royal College of Art.

==== 2010s to present ====
Bill Moggridge, a co-founder of IDEO and designer of the first laptop computer, served as Cooper-Hewitt's director in January 2011. The Carnegie Mansion was closed to the public in July 2011, during which the museum held exhibitions at the headquarters of the United Nations and on Governors Island. The museum opened a new online retail shop in 2012. That year, the Cooper-Hewitt created an additional space in Harlem as an education facility. Designer Todd Oldham donated design services for the space. After Moggridge's death in 2012, Caroline Baumann was named as the museum's director in June 2013.

In June 2014, the museum's name was changed again to Cooper Hewitt, Smithsonian Design Museum. A new graphic identity, wordmark, and new website were launched on this day. The identity was designed by Eddie Opara of Pentagram. The website was developed by Matcha Labs. On December 12, 2014, the Cooper Hewitt reopened to the public. Renovations included an "Immersion Room", an interactive space that provides visitors digital access to the museums collection of wallpaper. The main exhibition space was expanded and the museum had a custom open-source font, which remains available for free download and modification, designed for its reopening. In March 2015 the museum introduced the use of a digital pen for visitors to collect objects with.

In 2015, the terrace and garden renovations were completed and opened to the public, with design led by Walter Hood. The Cooper Hewitt hired conservator Cass Fino-Radin in 2016 to review the museum's digital collection, a process which took two years. Baumann resigned as director in February 2020, following an investigation by the Smithsonian's inspector general concerning her wedding to John Stewart Malcolmson in 2018. In response, several of the museum's board member threatened to resign, claiming Baumann had been improperly forced out. In February 2022, Maria Nicanor was appointed as the museum's director.

== Collection ==
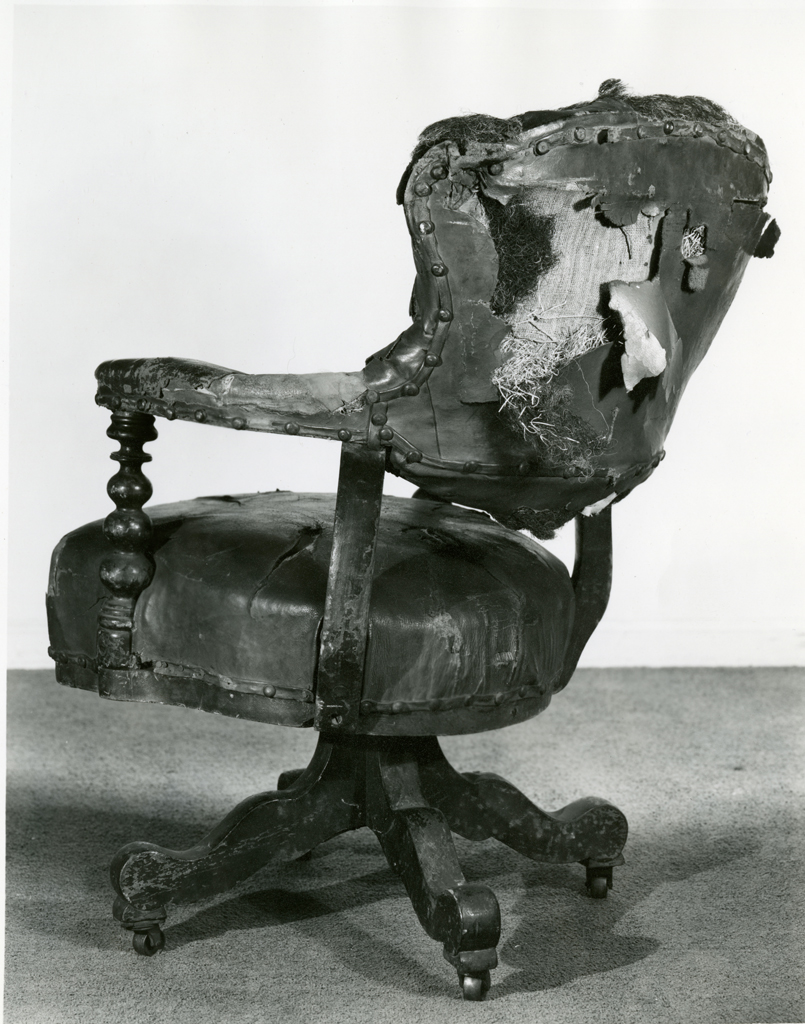
A chair used by Abraham Lincoln when he visited the Cooper Union in 1860. This is before it was reupholstered in 1949.

The Cooper Hewitt collections consist of decorative and design objects. The museum's original collection focused on architecture, sculpture, painted architecture, decorative arts, woodwork, metalwork, pottery, costume, musical instruments and furniture. The museum has more than 200,000 objects in its collection as of 2024, although estimates range as high as 250,000. These range from matchbooks to shopping bags, porcelain from the Soviet Union, and the papers of graphic designer Tibor Kalman. The museum had a metalwork gallery, which showcased historic iron grillwork and a room devoted to ironwork, both of which no longer are focus rooms.

=== Visual art collection ===
The museum holds the world's largest collection of works on paper by Hudson River School painter Frederic Edwin Church. By 1976, the museum's collection included 200 Tiepolo paintings, 2,000 F. E. Church sketches, and a large number of Winslow Homer drawings. In 2002, a rare 16th-century drawing from Michelangelo (for which the Cooper Union Museum had paid $60 in 1962) was discovered in the Cooper-Hewitt's collection.

=== Furniture collection ===
The Cooper Hewitt also has a large furniture collection. Some of the objects include a chair used by Abraham Lincoln during a visit to the Cooper Union, a cardboard easy chair designed by Frank Gehry, as well as "twig and root" furniture. Museum namesake Peter Cooper created the first steel chair in the United States, one of which resides in the museum collection.

=== Other objects ===
Upon its opening, Abram S. Hewitt's wife, Sarah Amelia Hewitt donated a lace collection, George Hearn donated two fountains worth $1,000, and Lloyd Bryce's wife donated art and objects from the Palace of Fontainebleau. When the museum acquired the Carnegie Mansion in 1972, it also received some interior decorations from the Widener family's townhouse at 5 East 70th Street (now the site of an annex to the Henry Clay Frick House). By the time the modern museum opened in 1976, it was recorded as having lantern brackets, window grilles, a balcony, 4,000 metal artifacts, and 30,000 international symbols donated by Henry Dreyfuss and his wife Doris. It also had other objects such as 2,000 buttons, 4,280 match cases, lock-and-key sets, pots, skyscraper drawings, and many pieces of Art Deco and Art Nouveau design.

The museum has held notable objects in its collection such as John Lennon's psychedelic Rolls-Royce. The car was donated by Lennon and Yoko Ono in 1978 and was auctioned off at Sotheby's in mid-1985 for $2.09 million. A punch bowl replicated by Eleanor Roosevelt, a scarlet Valentine Olivetti typewriter, and an Adrian Saxe vase were also part of the collection.

== Exhibitions ==
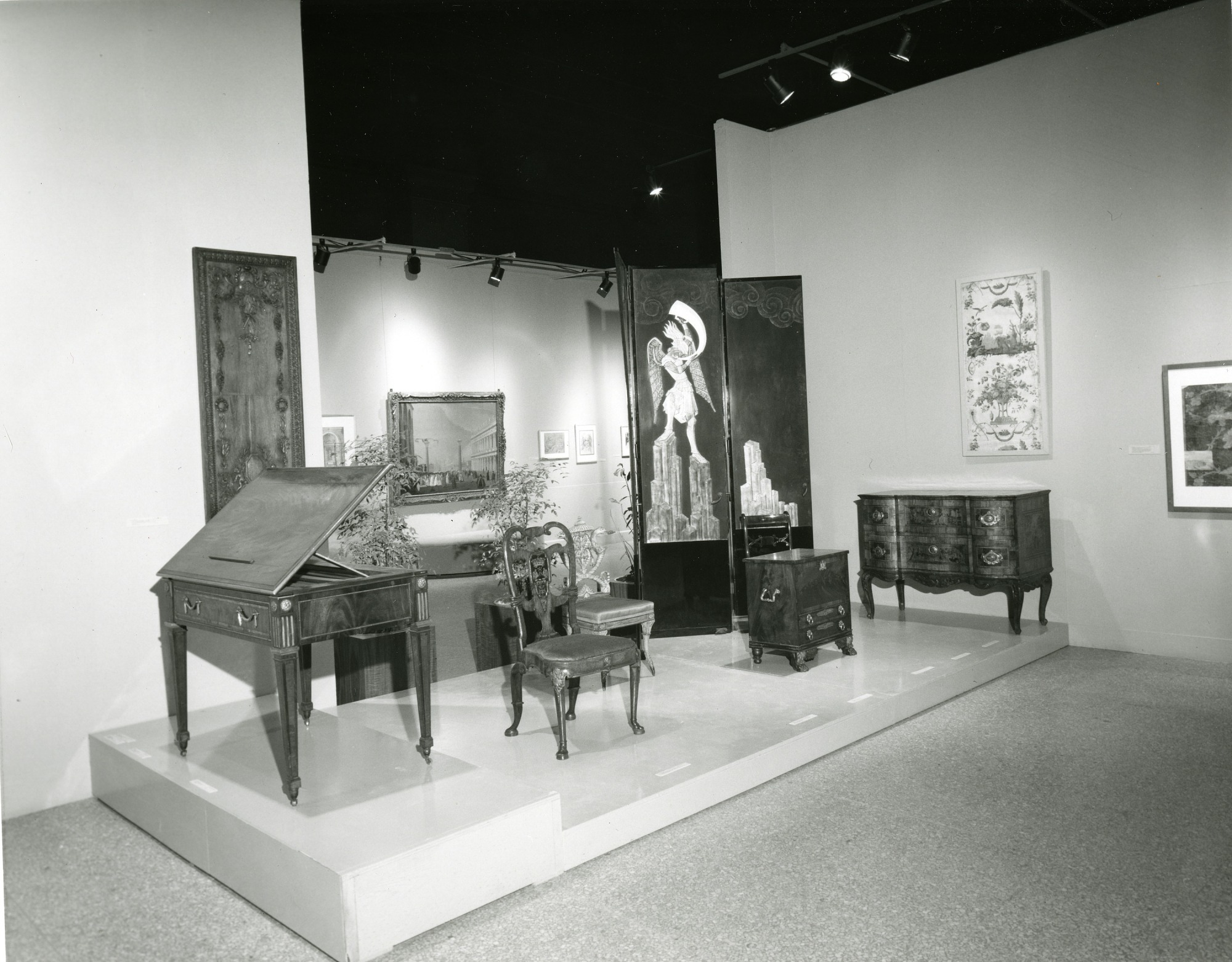
The 1967 exhibition Treasures from the Cooper Union

Exhibitions at the Cooper Hewitt explore the history and culture of design and decorative arts. Shows have historically focused on singular topics. The first themed shows were organized by Cooper Union Museum director Calvin S. Hathaway in 1933; beforehand, the objects in the museum's collections were primarily used for academic purposes.

=== Before the 1970s ===
The museum hosted two special exhibitions at the 1964 New York World's Fair. A 1968 exhibition called "Please Be Seated", focused on contemporary chairs.

=== 1970s to 1990s ===
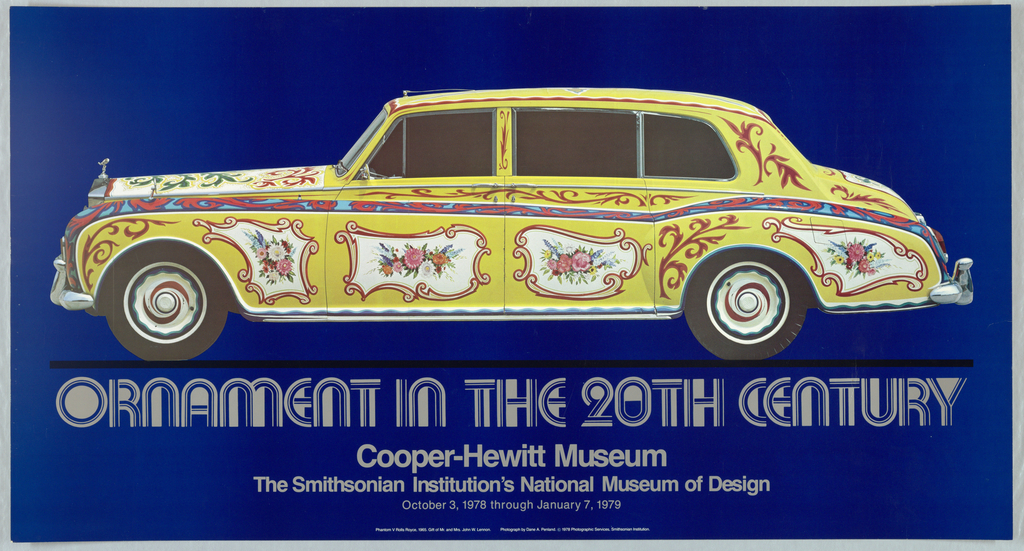
Poster, Ornament in the 20th Century; Manufactured by Cooper Hewitt, Smithsonian Design Museum: Archives; 1980-32-1114

During the 1970s, the museum hosted exhibits on subjects such as resort and motel architecture; objects from the Brighton Pavilion; architectural drawings; John Lennon's Rolls-Royce; Alvar Aalto's architectural works, and hundreds of objects on loan from various other Smithsonian museums. The museum's exhibits in the early 1980s concerned such themes as the history and culture of the ocean liner, puppets, hair styles, copy machine art, plants, British art, Scandinavian design, and teapots. In 1983, the Cooper-Hewitt was the first museum in the United States to exhibit the Amsterdam School. Topics of the museum's exhibits in the second half of the 1980s included wine-related objects, a showcase of art related to Berlin, a tribute to art dealer Siegfried Bing, and subway posters.

When the Cooper-Hewitt showcased its own collections in 1992, it was the longest-running show in the museum's history at the time, lasting 17 months.

==== Traveling exhibitions ====
The museum also tours exhibits through the Smithsonian Institution Traveling Exhibition Service. The first exhibit they toured was 1978's "Close Observation: Selected Oil Sketches by Frederic E. Church". In 1993, the Cooper-Hewitt created the exhibition "The Power of Maps", which was its first exhibition to be shown on the National Mall at the S. Dillon Ripley Gallery. The exhibit featured upwards of 200 maps from around the world. William III and Mary II of England were the focus of a 1988 exhibition. An exhibition featuring 16th- and 17th-century decorative arts from Burghley House.

=== 2000s to present ===
The jewelry of Van Cleef & Arpels was the focus of an exhibition in 2011. That year, artist Sonia Delaunay had a solo show at the museum. The Cooper-Hewitt worked with the Walker Art Center, in 2012, to develop "Graphic Design – Now In Production", which showcases graphic design that has been created since 2000. An additional exhibition was held in 2012, in light of the museum's closing due to renovations, at the United Nations Headquarters called "Design With the Other 90% Cities", about design and global issues.

Other exhibitions at the museum have included Puiforcat silver, wallpaper, the works of Alexander Girard, and universal design. In 2015, the museum hosted The Algorithm Auction, the world's first auction of computer algorithms.

In Cooper Hewitt's Face Values installation for the LONDON DESIGN BIENNALE 2018, a live facial data became the basis of dynamic graphic images and provocative conversations between humans and machines. The exhibition explored alternative uses of technologies that were typically used for security, surveillance, and behavioural profiling. Curated by Ellen Lupton, the installation was awarded with the LONDON DESIGN BIENNALE EMOTIONAL STATED MEDAL WINNER 2018.

During the COVID-19 pandemic, the Cooper Hewitt launched a digital exhibition platform. Designed by Linked by Air, the platform allows users to explore objects one by one in thematic sequences, much they would wander around the physical galleries of an exhibition.

== Programs ==
=== Outreach ===
The museum's National Design Education Center is sponsored by Target. Ongoing programs for preschoolers on up are offered, along with summer camps, professional development, educator resources, and even a master's program. In 2012, the Cooper Hewitt started work on its Harlem location, designed by Todd Oldham and sponsored by Target, which provided free workshops and programming.

=== Initiatives ===
The Cooper Hewitt is home to the National Design Awards. They also support a master's degree program offered in conjunction with Parsons School of Design. In 2006, the Cooper Hewitt and Mayor Michael Bloomberg declared October 15–21 National Design Week in New York City. The week focuses on outreach throughout the city, including schools, and organizations across the United States. The museum is free for the week. The museum sponsored a bike rack competition in 2008. The winners of the contest were a part of an exhibition at the museum.

In the early 2000s, the Cooper-Hewitt's website displayed only 500 of the 250,000 items in the museum's collection. The website was overhauled in 2006, following a $2 million gift from some of the museum's board members; the updated website provided educational programs and photographs of other objects in the museum's collection. In 2013, the Cooper Hewitt took over the code of Planetary, an iOS app that creates graphic visualizations of songs, and released the source code to the public. Media sources reported at the time that it was the museum's first-ever acquisition of software for exhibition purposes. After iOS App Store updates rendered the source code obsolete, an Australian developer released a patched version of the app in 2020.

== Building ==
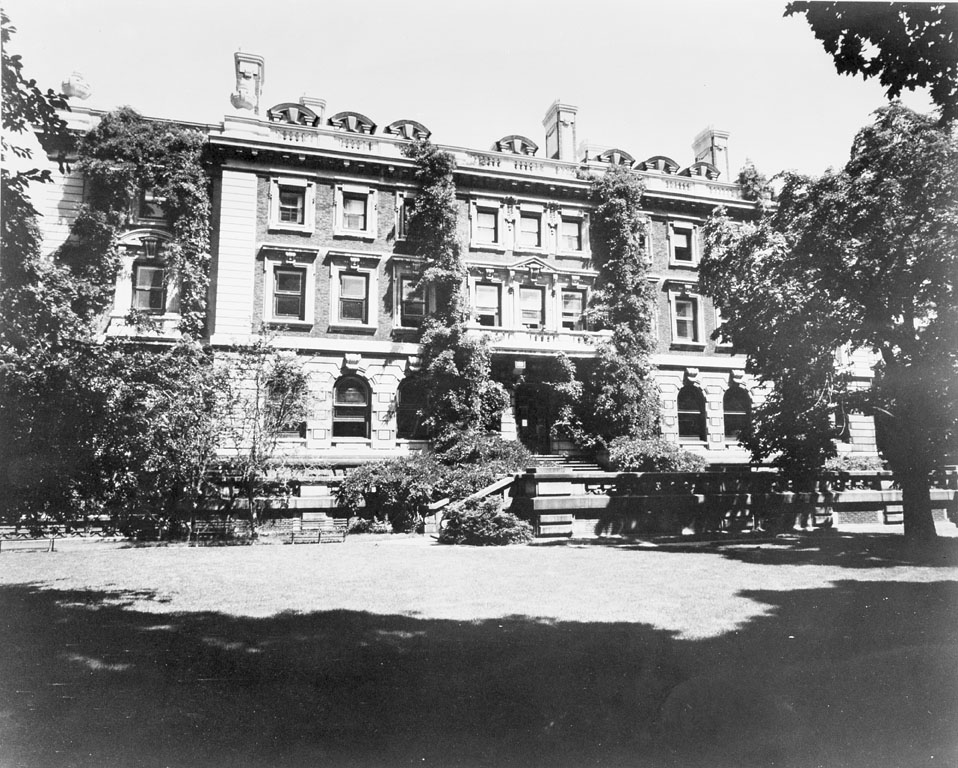
The Carnegie Mansion in 1976

The Cooper Hewitt is located in the Andrew Carnegie Mansion and two adjacent townhouses at 9 and 11 East 90th Street. The 64-room Georgian mansion was completed in 1902 as the home for Andrew Carnegie, his wife Louise, and their daughter Margaret Carnegie Miller. The property has a large private garden. The museum acquired the mansion and the house at 9 East 90th Street in 1972, followed by 11 East 90th Street in 1989. When the museum first obtained the house, the first and second floors were used as exhibit space, while the third floor contained the museum's library.

The museum closed for a $20 million renovation in 1995, reopening the next year. Another renovation was completed in 2014; that renovation cost $91 million and was the largest in the museum's history, partially financed by the museum endowment. To celebrate the reopening of the museum in 2015, the Cooper Hewitt released a downloadable 3D scan of the building.

== Library and study rooms ==
The museum's library was originally known as the Doris and Henry Dreyfuss Study Center. The library was described in the 1980s as comprising 45,000 volumes (including 4,000 rare copies), over 1.5 million pictures, and various design journals and magazines. Its holdings covered such disparate subjects as interior, industrial, and graphic design; furniture; and theater. The Cooper Hewitt also includes the Drue Heinz Study Center for Drawings and Prints and the Henry Luce Study Room for American Art, which were added to the museum in the 1990s.

== Attendance ==
The Cooper Hewitt is the only Smithsonian museum to charge an admission fee to visitors. The museum receives approximately $500,000 a year in revenue from admissions.

The museum recorded about 12,000 monthly visitors, or 144,000 annual visitors, by 2002. As of 2023, the museum sees approximately 150,000 visitors a year.

== Reception and commentary ==
When the Cooper-Hewitt moved into the Carnegie Mansion, a Newsday critic called the first exhibition "an unprecedented opportunity to see a museum as a mind-expanding playground". The Washington Post wrote that it was "the foremost American museum of antique and contemporary design". Both the Post and The Boston Globe wrote that the Cooper-Hewitt was similar in scale only to the Musée des Arts Décoratifs, Paris, and the Victoria and Albert Museum, London.

A critic for Condé Nast Traveler wrote that the "Cooper Hewitt is worth a visit both for the collection and also for the building itself".

== Publications ==
- Design and Social Impact: A Cross-Sectoral Agenda for Design Education, Research and Practice (2013). New York: Cooper-Hewitt, National Design Museum.

== See also ==
- List of museums in New York City
- List of museums and cultural institutions in New York City
- List of design museums
