= Lisa Taylor =

Lisa Taylor may refer to:

- Lisa Taylor (R&B singer), 1990s American singer
- Lisa Taylor (model), model and actress from New York City
- Lisa Taylor (museum director), American artist and museum director
- Lisa Taylor (alleged murderer), of the Taylor sisters convicted and then acquitted of murdering Alison Shaughnessy
