= Lisa Taylor (museum director) =

American artist and museum director

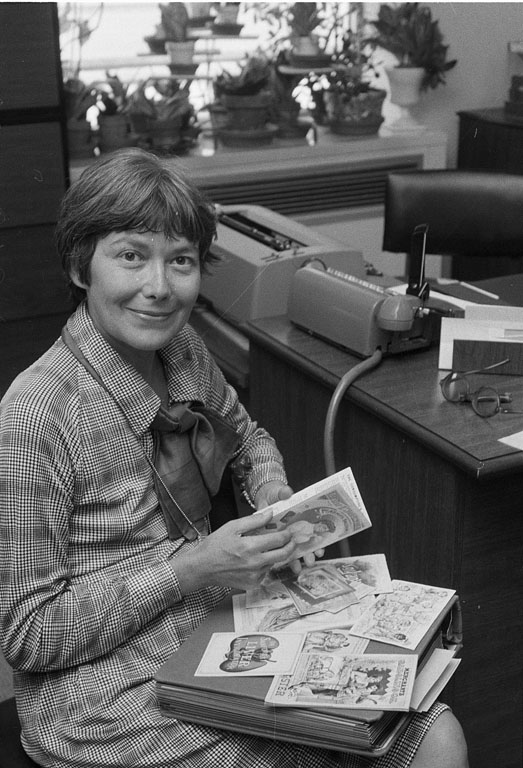
- Taylor inspecting samples of antique advertising art, 1979.
- Born: January 8, 1933
- Died: 1991 (aged 57–58)
- Occupation: Museum Director

Lisa Suter Taylor (1933–1991) was an American artist and museum director. Taylor served as the first director of the Cooper-Hewitt Museum of Decorative Arts and Design from 1969 to 1987, and was the first woman director of a museum within the Smithsonian Institution.

== Early life and education ==
Taylor was born in New York, the daughter of architect Theo von Bergen-Maier and painter Martina Weincerl. She trained as a painter, ceramist, and calligrapher, studying at the Corcoran School of Art, Georgetown University, and Johns Hopkins University. She was awarded honorary doctorates from the Parsons School of Design and Cooper Union.

== Career ==
From 1958 to 1962 Taylor was a staff member of the President's Fine Arts Commission. From 1962 to 1966 she was the membership director at the Corcoran Gallery of Art. In 1966 she started at the Smithsonian as a Program Director, where she developed a successful education program.

=== Cooper Hewitt - Smithsonian Design Museum ===
The collection of the Cooper Union Museum came under the wing of the Smithsonian in 1967. Shortly after, the Andrew Carnegie Mansion was donated to the Smithsonian in 1968 to become the new home for the Cooper-Hewitt Museum of Design. After its transfer to the Smithsonian, the museum was renamed the Cooper-Hewitt Museum of Decorative Arts and Design, and Taylor was appointed director in 1969. This made her the first ever woman to lead a Smithsonian museum.

In the following 4 years, Taylor and her staff raised over $6 million for the renovation of the mansion and formation of the museum. After being closed since 1963, the museum opened to the public in 1976. The first exhibition was MAN transFORMS, with Hans Hollein and nine designers.

While at the museum, Taylor oversaw the development of a Master's degree in Decorative Arts and developed both adult and young-person education programs. In her time as director, she presented 175 exhibitions in the museum, and enjoyed mixing more serious exhibits with humorous ones.

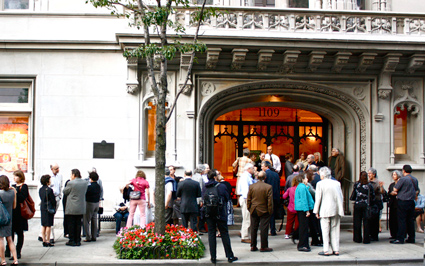
A group of people gather outside the Jewish Museum in New York during the 2011 Museum Mile Festival.

In 1979, Taylor created the annual Museum Mile Festival, a one-day, free festival on New York City's Fifth Avenue where cultural institutions are open to the public.

She was awarded the Smithsonian's Exceptional Service Award in 1973.

After she retired as director in 1987, she was succeeded by Dianne Pilgrim.

== Personal life ==
Taylor was married, with two children and three step children.

In addition to a New York apartment, Taylor enjoyed spending time at her house in Martha's Vineyard. A Japanese-style house designed by architect Teruo Hara, everything inside was made for the space, from the furniture, to the dishes, to the toilet paper racks.
