= Margaret Carnegie Miller =

American philanthropist

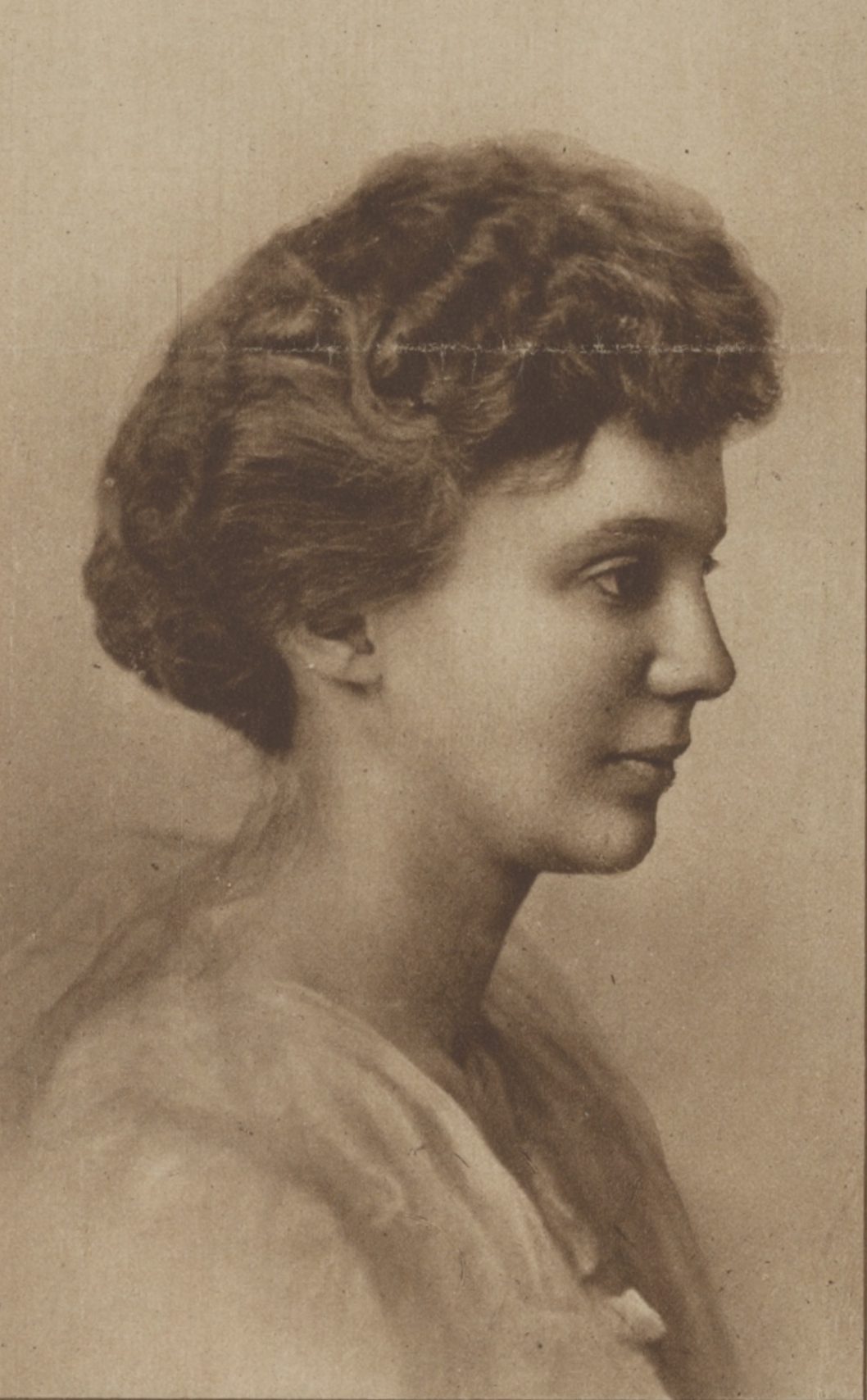
- Margaret Carnegie, c. 1918
- Born: Margaret Cameron Carnegie; March 30, 1897; Manhattan, New York City, U.S.
- Died: April 11, 1990 (aged 93); Fairfield, Connecticut, U.S.
- Spouse: Roswell Miller Jr. (m. 1919; div. 1953)
- Children: 4
- Parent(s): Andrew Carnegie; Louise Whitfield Carnegie

Margaret Carnegie Miller (March 30, 1897 – April 11, 1990) was the only child of industrialist and philanthropist Andrew Carnegie and Louise Whitfield, and heiress to the Carnegie fortune.

A resident of Manhattan, New York City, from 1934 to 1973, Miller was a trustee of the Carnegie Corporation of New York, a grant-making foundation. The foundation was established by her father in 1911. From 1973 until her death in 1990, she was an honorary lifetime trustee.

== Personal life ==
On April 22, 1919, four months before her father's death, Margaret married Roswell Miller Jr. (1894–1983) at the Andrew Carnegie Mansion at 2 East 91st Street on the Upper East Side. Officiating at the wedding were Rev. William Pierson Merril, pastor of the Brick Presbyterian Church, where Margaret and her mother Louise Carnegie were members, and Rev. Henry Sloane Coffin, pastor of the Madison Avenue Presbyterian Church, where Andrew Carnegie was a member.

Margaret Carnegie's marriage to Roswell Miller ended in divorce in 1953. During the divorce, she lost her Atlantic Beach summer house.

Miller had four children: Louise, Roswell III, Barbara, and Margret; three grandchildren: Marlene Parkinson, Barbara Sanders, and Pamela Morrison Mitchell; and six great-grandchildren: Andrew Boggs, Morgan Boggs, Laura Draper, Courtney Sweeney, Dylan Evans, and Graham Parkinson.

== Death ==
Miller died on April 11, 1990, at her home in Fairfield, Connecticut, at the age of 93.

== In literature and popular culture ==
The plight of Margaret Carnegie as the only child of a millionaire is the subject of Scottish author and columnist Neil Munro's "Carnegie's Wee Lassie" (1902), one of his Erchie MacPherson sketches.
