= Laylight =

Glazed panel that admits light

As an element of architecture, a laylight is a glazed panel usually set flush with the ceiling for the purpose of admitting natural or artificial light. Laylights typically utilize stained glass or lenses in their glazing. A laylight differs from a glazed (or closed) skylight in that a skylight functions as a roof window or aperture, while a laylight is flush with the ceiling of an interior space. When paired with a roof lantern or skylight on a sloped roof, a laylight functions as an interior light diffuser. Before the advent of electric lighting, laylights allowed transmission of light between floors in larger buildings, and were not always paired with skylights.

== See also ==
- Daylighting
- Pavement light
- Prism lighting
