= Paul W. Thompson =

United States Army general (1906–1996)

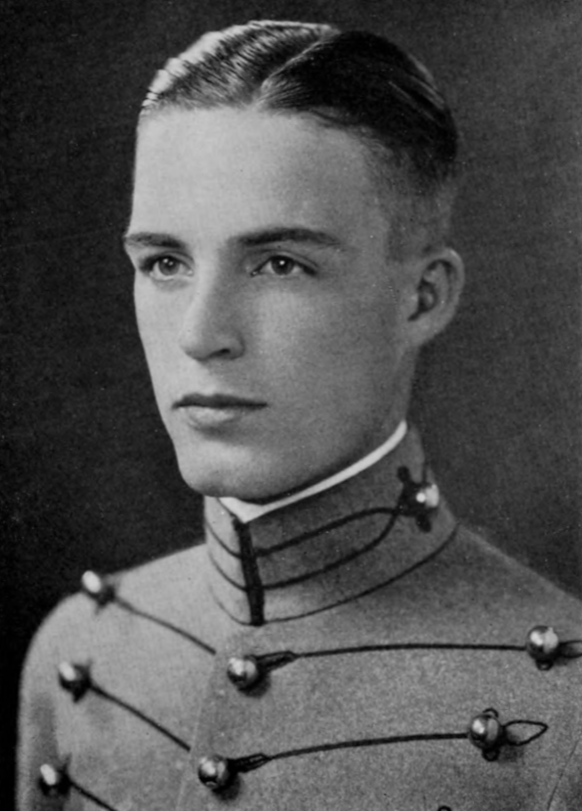
- As a West Point cadet
- Born: Paul Williams Thompson; 19 December 1906; Alliance, Nebraska, US
- Died: 9 February 1996 (aged 89); Daytona Beach, Florida, US
- Burial place: West Point Cemetery
- Military career
- Allegiance: United States
- Branch: United States Army
- Service years: 1929–1946
- Rank: Brigadier general
- Nickname: Tommy
- Service number: O17506
- Unit: Corps of Engineers
- Commands: 6th Engineer Special Brigade; United States Army Assault Training Centre
- Conflicts: World War II; Operation Overlord (WIA)
- Awards: Distinguished Service Cross; Legion of Merit (2); Commander of the Legion of Honour (France); Croix de Guerre (1939–1945) (France); Commander of the Order of Leopold II (Belgium); Officer of the Order of the British Empire (UK)

Paul Williams Thompson (19 December 1906 – 9 February 1996) was an American military officer. He served as a colonel in the United States Army during World War II on Omaha Beach in the Normandy Invasion, where he was wounded in an action for which he was awarded the Distinguished Service Cross. He was later promoted to brigadier general.

== Early life and career ==
Paul Williams Thompson was born in Alliance, Nebraska, on 19 December 1906, the son of Silas W. and June Williams Thompson. He entered the United States Military Academy at West Point, New York, on 1 July 1925 and graduated on 13 June 1929, ranked 13th in his class. As a cadet, he acquired the nickname "Tommy".

On graduation, Thompson was commissioned as a second lieutenant in the Corps of Engineers. His first posting was to Kansas City, Missouri, where he was engaged in river improvement work. He was then joined the 2nd Engineer Regiment at Fort Logan, Colorado, on 13 September 1930. In June 1931, he entered the State University of Iowa, earning a Bachelor of Science degree in civil engineering from Tulane University.

Thompson was assigned to the Waterways Experiment Station at Vicksburg, Mississippi, in June 1932. In October 1933, he went to Omaha, Nebraska, where he worked on river improvements. He was promoted to first lieutenant on 1 October 1934. In October 1935, he was awarded a Freeman Fellowship to study abroad. He attended graduate classes at the Technische Hochschule zu Berlin and studied the waterways of European countries. On completion of his studies, he was assigned to the Office of the American Military Attaché in Berlin and was detailed to some German Army engineer units. While there, he met Elfriede Greimelmeier, whom he married on 23 January 1937. He returned to the Waterways Experiment Station in February 1937.

== World War II ==
Promoted to captain on 13 June 1939, Thompson attended the Engineer School at Fort Belvoir, Virginia, after which he joined the 5th Engineer Regiment, which was stationed there. In June 1940, he was assigned to the Office of the Chief of Engineers in Washington, D.C. He was promoted to major in the Army of the United States on 10 October 1941 and lieutenant colonel on 1 Feb 1942.

Thompson commanded the United States Army Assault Training Centre at Woolacombe in the UK from April 1943 to March 1944, with the rank of colonel from 4 July 1943. In this role he trained troops and developed tactics for the amphibious assault on Normandy. For this service he was awarded the Legion of Merit. In March 1944, he assumed command of the 6th Engineer Special Brigade, which he led on Omaha Beach on D-Day. He was awarded the Bronze Star Medal, the Purple Heart and the Distinguished Service Cross. His citation read:

The President of the United States of America, authorized by Act of Congress July 9, 1918, takes pleasure in presenting the Distinguished Service Cross to Colonel (Corps of Engineers) Paul Williams Thompson, United States Army, for extraordinary heroism in connection with military operations against an armed enemy while serving as Commanding officer of the 6th Engineer Special Brigade (Provisional) (Separate), First U.S. Army, in action against enemy forces at Omaha Beach during the invasion of Normandy, France, on 6 June 1944. The attack on the vital beach exit was being held up by heavy enemy machine gun fire. Upon discovering the situation and ascertaining that the assault units were pinned to the beach and were not pressing the attack, Colonel Thompson called for volunteers to assist in wiping out the machine guns. Several infantrymen volunteered and, with complete disregard for his own safety, Colonel Thompson, while under heavy enemy fire, blew a gap in the wire entanglements. He then fearlessly led his party through the gap and was rushing to assault the enemy machine guns when he was seriously wounded by enemy fire from another emplacement. His heroic leadership, personal bravery and zealous devotion to duty exemplify the highest traditions of the military forces of the United States and reflect great credit upon himself and the United States Army.

After he recovered from his wounds, Thompson returned to Washington, D.C., in September 1944, where he served in the Operations Division of the War Department General Staff, working in its Current Group. In April 1945, he became the Information and Education officer of the Communications Zone, the logistics arm of the U.S. Army in the European Theater of Operations. As such, he was the officer responsible for the American Forces Network in Europe, the publication of Stars and Stripes and other G.I. periodicals, the many unit histories published for the men and women who served in them, and the re-education of large numbers of soldiers either headed home, or seeking reassignment in the Asiatic-Pacific theater prior to the capitulation of Japan. He was promoted to brigadier general on 6 July 1945, and was awarded an oak leaf cluster to his Legion of Merit.

Thompson was retired at his own request on 31 June 1946 with his substantive rank of major, but was promoted in retirement to his wartime rank of brigadier general on 29 June 1948. In addition to his distinguished American decorations, he had also been awarded the French Commander of the Legion of Honour and Croix de Guerre (1939–1945) with palm, and made Commander of the Belgian Order of Leopold II and an honorary Officer of the Order of the British Empire.

== Later life ==
Thompson was hired by Reader's Digest as the head of its European operations in 1946. In this role, he started foreign-language editions of the Reader's Digest in Belgium, France, Germany and Switzerland. He rose to become its director of international operations in 1957, and as such oversaw its expansion into Asia. He became Executive Vice President and General Manager in 1966, and oversaw the expansion of the Reader's Digest into Eastern Europe and Russia. He insisted owner DeWitt Wallace institute a rule of mandatory retirement for executives at age 65, and he retired in 1971 when he reached that age.

Thompson became the president of the West Point Association of Graduates, and in this capacity he was involved in a reorganization that saw the introduction of a new, expanded fund-raising program. He also presided over the Boscobel restoration, which saw it transformed into a significant museum.

Thompson's wife died on 9 May 1980. On 26 January 1983, he married Josette Berkland in a ceremony at the West Point Cadet Chapel. Thompson died in Daytona Beach, Florida, on 9 February 1996, and was buried in the West Point Cemetery.

== Dates of rank ==
| Insignia | Rank | Component | Date | Reference |
|---|---|---|---|---|
| | Second Lieutenant | Corps of Engineers | 13 June 1929 | |
| | First Lieutenant | Corps of Engineers | 1 October 1934 | |
| | Captain | Corps of Engineers | 13 June 1939 | |
| | Major | Army of the United States | 10 October 1941 | |
| | Lieutenant Colonel | Army of the United States | 1 February 1942 | |
| | Colonel | Army of the United States | 4 July 1943 | |
| | Brigadier General | Army of the United States | 6 July 1945 | |
| | Major | Retired | 31 July 1946 | |
| | Brigadier General | Retired | 29 June 1948 | |
