= Dianne H. Pilgrim =

American art historian and museum director (1941–2019)

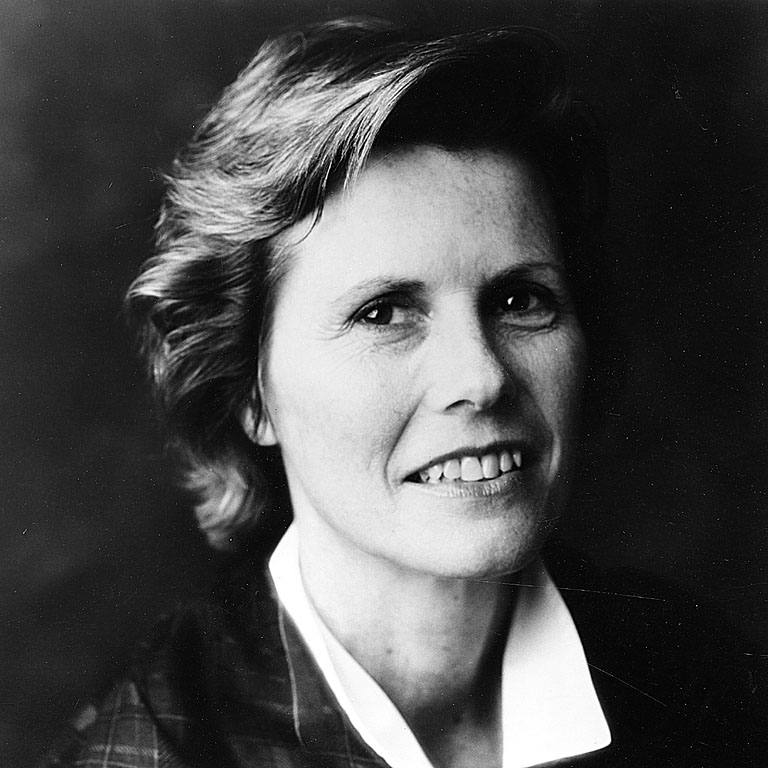
- Dianne H. Pilgrim, from a 1988 publication.
- Born: Dianne DeGlow Hauserman; 1941; Cleveland, Ohio
- Died: December 2, 2019 (aged 77–78); New York City
- Occupations: Museum professional, art historian

Dianne Hauserman Pilgrim (1941 – December 2, 2019) was an American art historian and museum professional.

== Early life ==
Dianne DeGlow Hauserman was born in Cleveland, Ohio, the daughter of John Martin Hauserman and Norma Goodwin Bloom Hauserman. She graduated from Pennsylvania State University in 1963. She earned a master's degree at the New York University Institute of Fine Arts, with a 1965 master's thesis on museum professional John Cotton Dana.

== Career ==
Pilgrim held research and curatorial positions at the Metropolitan Museum of Art, the Finch College Museum of Art, and the Brooklyn Museum of Art. In 1988, Pilgrim became director of the Cooper Hewitt Museum of Decorative Arts and Design. During her tenure as director, the Cooper Hewitt's historic buildings underwent a major renovation and expansion, with wheelchair accessibility as a high priority. Universal design was also a theme in the museum's exhibits during her directorship. She retired from the Cooper Hewitt in 2000.

Pilgrim was the co-author of The Machine Age in America: 1918-1941 (1986, with Richard Guy Wilson and Dickran Tashjian) and The American Renaissance 1876-1917 (1979, with Richard Guy Wilson and Richard N. Murray), both for the Brooklyn Museum. She also wrote exhibition catalogs, including The Power of Maps (1993) for the Cooper Hewitt and American Impressionist and Realist Paintings and Drawings from the Collection of Mr. and Mrs. Raymond J. Horowitz (1973) for the Metropolitan Museum of Art.

== Personal life ==
Dianne Hauserman married fellow curator James Frederick Pilgrim in 1968; they divorced in 1978. Dianne Pilgrim described herself as having dyslexia, and she was diagnosed with multiple sclerosis in the late 1970s. She used a cane, crutches, and a wheelchair. "I used to kill myself walking from my car to my office without the wheelchair," she told an interviewer in 1987. "But I finally realized that I had to save my energy for the important things in life." She died in 2019, aged 78 years, in New York City.

== Publications ==
- American Impressionist and realist paintings and drawings from the collection of Mr. & Mrs. Raymond J. Horowitz, exhibited at the Metropolitan Museum of Art, 19 April through 3 June 1973, 1973
- An American dream : (letter from Washington), 1980
- Eighteenth century American interiors, 1982
- The machine age in America, 1920-1941 : prospectus for an exhibition at The Brooklyn Museum, Fall 1985, 1983
- The American Renaissance : decorative arts and interior design from 1876 to 1917
