= Helena B. Cobb =

American educator & missionary (1869–1922)

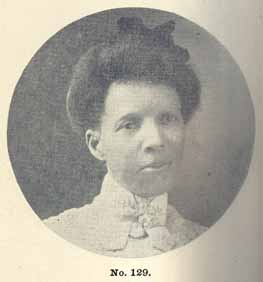
- Cobb, c. 1906
- Born: Helena Maud Brown; January 24, 1869; Monroe County, Georgia, United States
- Died: December 22, 1922 (aged 53); Atlanta, Fulton County, Georgia, United States
- Resting place: O'Neal Cemetery, Barnesville, Georgia, U.S.
- Education: Atlanta University

Helena B. Cobb (née Helena Maud Brown; January 24, 1869 – December 22, 1922) was an American educator and missionary from Georgia. Born in Monroe County, Georgia, she attended Atlanta University and served as an educator and principal at many schools for African Americans in the state. She was also active in organizing and pushing for greater missionary opportunities for women within the Colored Methodist Episcopal Church. In the early 1900s she founded Helena B. Cobb Institute in Barnesville, Georgia.

== Early life and career ==
Helena Maud Brown was born in Monroe County, Georgia on January 24, 1869. (Note: Some sources give her date of birth as January 24, 1870.) Her parents, Jonah Brown and Louvonia Brown, were deeply religious Christians. She attended primary schools in Monroe County and nearby Pike County, eventually enrolling in Storr's School in Atlanta in 1883. She later enrolled in Atlanta University in 1885, earning a Bachelor of Arts degree and graduating with high honors on May 28, 1891. (Note: Her date of graduation is given as May 28, 1901 in one source.)

After graduating, Brown served as an educator at multiple schools throughout the state. She served as the principal of the public school in Milner, Georgia, an assistant principal of a public school in Columbus, Georgia, and a teacher (and later principal) at Haines Normal and Industrial Institute in Augusta, Georgia. She later served as principal of Lampson Normal School in Marshallville, Georgia, resigning in May 1903.

On December 19, 1899, while still serving at Haines, she married Andrew Jackson Cobb, a minister within the Colored Methodist Episcopal Church (CME Church). He later died on September 7, 1915. Helena was very active in the relatively new denomination, pushing for greater roles for women in missionary positions. In 1902, she was elected president of the Georgia Conference Mission Society, and in 1906 she became the editor-in-chief of Missionary Age, the official publication for the church's women's missionary movement.

== Helena B. Cobb Institute ==
In the early 1900s, Cobb founded the Helena B. Cobb Institute in Barnesville, Georgia. (Note: Sources disagree on the year of its founding. Cobb's entry in the Georgia Women of Achievement website gives an exact date of opening as October 7, 1909. However, in Notable Black American Women, Jessie Carney Smith gives a founding year of 1908, which is also the year given by Anne H. and Anthony B. Pinn in Fortress Introduction to Black Church History. Additionally, a reference book on the history of the Colored Methodist Episcopal Church gives a founding year of 1906.) Modeled after Booker T. Washington's Tuskegee Institute, the institute provided education to African American girls, and was the only school within the CME Church for women. A 1910s survey of black education in the United States carried out by the Department of the Interior's Bureau of Education (a predecessor of the Department of Education) cited the institute as an effective source of supplementary education to African Americans in the area.

== Death and legacy ==
Cobb died in Atlanta on December 22, 1922. In 2003, she was inducted into the Georgia Women of Achievement.

== Bibliography ==
- Caldwell, A. B., ed. (1917). History of the American Negro and His Institutions (Georgia ed.). A. B. Caldwell Publishing Company. pp. 246–249 – via Google Books.
- "Helena Maud Brown Cobb". Georgia Women of Achievement.
- Pinn, Anne H.; Pinn, Anthony B. (2002). Fortress Introduction to Black Church History. Fortress Press. ISBN 978-1-4514-0383-1 – via Google Books.
- Smith, Jessie Carney, ed. (1996). Notable Black American Women. Book II. Gale Research. ISBN 978-0-8103-9177-2 – via Google Books.
- Sommerville, Raymond R. Jr. (2004). An Ex-colored Church: Social Activism in the CME Church, 1870-1970. Mercer University Press. ISBN 978-0-86554-903-6 – via Google Books.
