= Aldora, Georgia =

- Town
- Location in Lamar County and the state of Georgia
- Coordinates: 33°2′57″N 84°10′32″W
- Country: United States
- State: Georgia
- County: Lamar

Government
  - Type: City commission government
  - Chairman: James Matthews
  - Body: Aldora City Council

Area
  - Total: 0.25 sq mi (0.66 km^{2})
  - Land: 0.24 sq mi (0.62 km^{2})
  - Water: 0.015 sq mi (0.04 km^{2})
- Elevation: 817 ft (249 m)

Population (2020)
  - Total: 0
  - Density: 0/sq mi (0/km^{2})
- Time zone: UTC-5 (Eastern (EST))
  - Summer (DST): UTC-4 (EDT)
- FIPS code: 13-01248
- GNIS feature ID: 0331014

Aldora is a town in Lamar County, Georgia, United States. As of the 2020 census, the town had a recorded population of 0, after the inhabited area was vacated; however, in 2023 it annexed a populated area, and as of 2024 the population was estimated at 189.

== History ==
The Georgia General Assembly incorporated Aldora as a town in 1906.

== Geography ==
Aldora is located in south-central Lamar County at 33°2′57″N 84°10′32″W (33.049078, -84.175552). It is bordered to the east by Barnesville, the county seat.

Georgia State Route 18 passes through the south side of the town, leading east into Barnesville and west 14 miles (23 km) to Zebulon. U.S. Route 41 and State Route 7 form the eastern border of the town; US-41/SR-7 leads north 16 miles (26 km) to Griffin and east the same distance to Forsyth.

According to the United States Census Bureau, Aldora has a total area of 0.25 square miles (0.66 km^{2}), of which 0.24 square miles (0.62 km^{2}) are land and 0.02 square miles (0.04 km^{2}), or 6.50%, are water. The town drains west to Little Potato Creek, a tributary of Potato Creek and part of the Flint River watershed.

== Demographics ==
Historical population
Census	Pop.	Note	%±
1920	365		—
1930	595		63.0%
1940	746		25.4%
1950	591		−20.8%
1960	535		−9.5%
1970	322		−39.8%
1980	139		−56.8%
1990	127		−8.6%
2000	98		−22.8%
2010	103		5.1%
2020	0		−100.0%
U.S. Decennial Census; 1850-1870 1880; 1890-1910 1920-1930; 1930-1940 1940-1950; 1960-1980 1980-2000

At the 2020 census, Aldora's population was recorded as 0. While the town had 103 residents at the 2010 census, in 2018 a portion of the Lamar County High School, located in Aldora, was demolished. All homes in the Aldora Village to the east of the high school were sold, with plans to move the homes and build new single-family housing in the area. At the 2010 Census, this was the only populated portion of the town, and as a result of its clearing, at the 2020 Census, its population was zero. However, the Census Bureau's Boundary and Annexation Survey (BAS) reports that Aldora annexed 8 acres of land on January 1, 2023, which the BAS maps for Aldora indicate correspond to a set of apartments known as Powell Place. As a result, the Population Estimates Program, also administered by the Census Bureau, estimates that as of 2024, 189 people reside in Aldora, and further estimates that at the 2020 Census, 164 people lived within the current boundaries of the town.

As of the census of 2000, there were 98 people, 43 households, and 30 families residing in the town. The population density was 298.1 inhabitants per square mile (115.1/km^{2}). There were 45 housing units at an average density of 136.9 per square mile (52.9/km^{2}). The racial makeup of the town was 100.00% White.

There were 43 households, out of which 23.3% had children under the age of 18 living with them, 58.1% were married couples living together, 11.6% had a female householder with no husband present, and 30.2% were non-families. 27.9% of all households were made up of individuals, and 18.6% had someone living alone who was 65 years of age or older. The average household size was 2.28 and the average family size was 2.73.

In the town, the population was spread out, with 19.4% under the age of 18, 4.1% from 18 to 24, 22.4% from 25 to 44, 28.6% from 45 to 64, and 25.5% who were 65 years of age or older. The median age was 50 years. For every 100 females, there were 92.2 males. For every 100 females age 18 and over, there were 92.7 males.

The median income for a household in the town was $22,083, and the median income for a family was $22,083. Males had a median income of $20,625 versus $19,583 for females. The per capita income for the town was $10,693. There were 10.7% of families and 11.8% of the population living below the poverty line, including 25.0% of under eighteens and 16.7% of those over 64.

== Education ==
All of the town is in the Lamar County School District.
