= Lamar County Courthouse =

- U.S. National Register of Historic Places
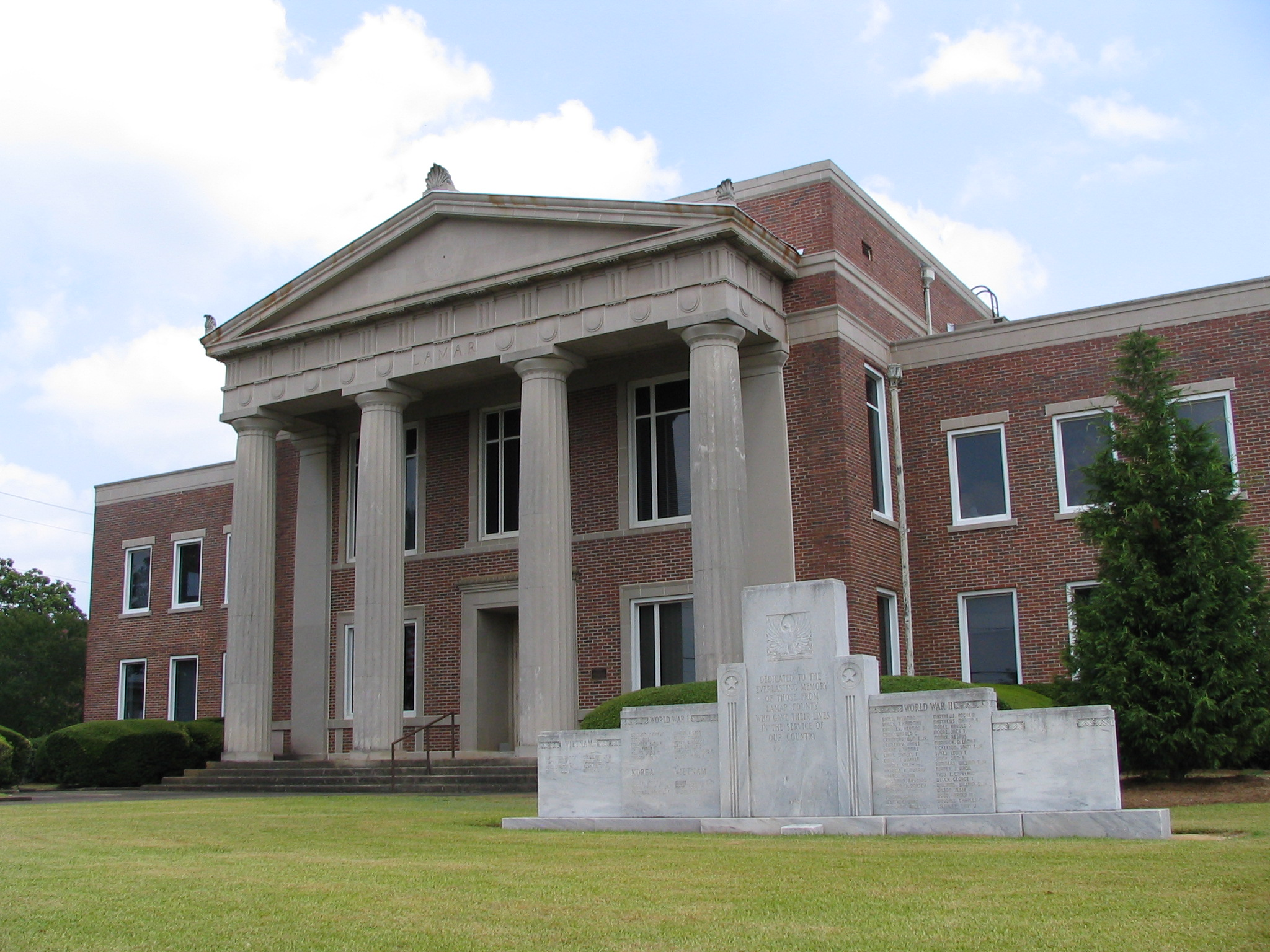

- Location within Georgia Location within the United States
- Location: Thomaston St., Barnesville, Georgia
- Coordinates: 33°3′8″N 84°9′22″W
- Area: less than one acre
- Built: 1931
- Architect: Eugene C. Wachendorff
- Architectural style: Classical Revival
- MPS: Georgia County Courthouses TR
- NRHP reference No.: 80001103
- Added to NRHP: September 18, 1980

Lamar County Courthouse is located on Thomaston Street in Barnesville, Georgia. The county courthouse was designed by Eugene C. Wachendorff and built in 1931. It was added to the National Register of Historic Places on September 18, 1980.

== See also ==
- National Register of Historic Places listings in Lamar County, Georgia
