= National Register of Historic Places listings in Lamar County, Georgia =

This is a list of properties and districts in Lamar County, Georgia that are listed on the National Register of Historic Places (NRHP).

This National Park Service list is complete through NPS recent listings posted March 21, 2025.

== Current listings ==
	Name on the Register	Image	Date listed	Location	City or town	Description
1	Barnesville Commercial Historic District	Barnesville Commercial Historic District	June 20, 1995 (#95000733)	Roughly bounded by College, Taylor and Market Sts. and the Central of GA RR tracks 33°03′17″N 84°09′18″W	Barnesville	
2	Barnesville Depot	Barnesville Depot	April 30, 1986 (#86000916)	Plaza Way and Main St. 33°03′16″N 84°09′21″W	Barnesville	Built in 1912
3	Carnegie Library of Barnesville	Carnegie Library of Barnesville	February 3, 1987 (#86003684)	Library St. 33°03′10″N 84°09′30″W	Barnesville	
4	Benjamin Gachet House	Benjamin Gachet House	April 17, 1997 (#97000301)	GA 18, 3 mi. W of Barnesville; 33°03′40″N 84°12′30″W	Barnesville	
5	Johnstonville-Goggins Historic District	Johnstonville-Goggins Historic District	November 2, 2000 (#00001283)	Johnstonville Road, west of Interstate 75; 33°05′22″N 84°04′27″W	Johnstonville	
6	Lamar County Courthouse	Lamar County Courthouse	September 18, 1980 (#80001103)	Thomaston St. 33°03′08″N 84°09′22″W	Barnesville	
7	Redbone Community House		April 9, 1998 (#98000323)	Community House Rd., jct. with Sappington Rd. 32°59′22″N 84°05′50″W	Barnesville	
8	Thomaston Street Historic District	Thomaston Street Historic District	July 28, 1995 (#95000908)	Roughly, along Thomaston and Greenwood Sts. and Stafford and Georgia Aves. 33°02′46″N 84°09′35″W	Barnesville	
