= Lamar County School District =

Lamar County School District may refer to:

- Lamar County School District (Georgia)
- Lamar County School District (Mississippi)
