= Redbone Community House =

- U.S. National Register of Historic Places
- Location within Georgia Location within the United States
- Nearest city: Barnesville, Georgia
- Coordinates: 32°59′22″N 84°5′50″W
- Area: 1 acre (0.40 ha)
- Built: 1935
- NRHP reference No.: 98000323
- Added to NRHP: April 9, 1998

Redbone Community House is a historic clubhouse building in Barnesville, Georgia. It was added to the National Register of Historic Places on April 9, 1998. It is located at Community House Road at the junction with Sappington Road.

It was a Works Project Administration project.

== See also ==
- National Register of Historic Places listings in Lamar County, Georgia
