= Barnesville station (Georgia) =

- Barnesville Depot
- U.S. National Register of Historic Places
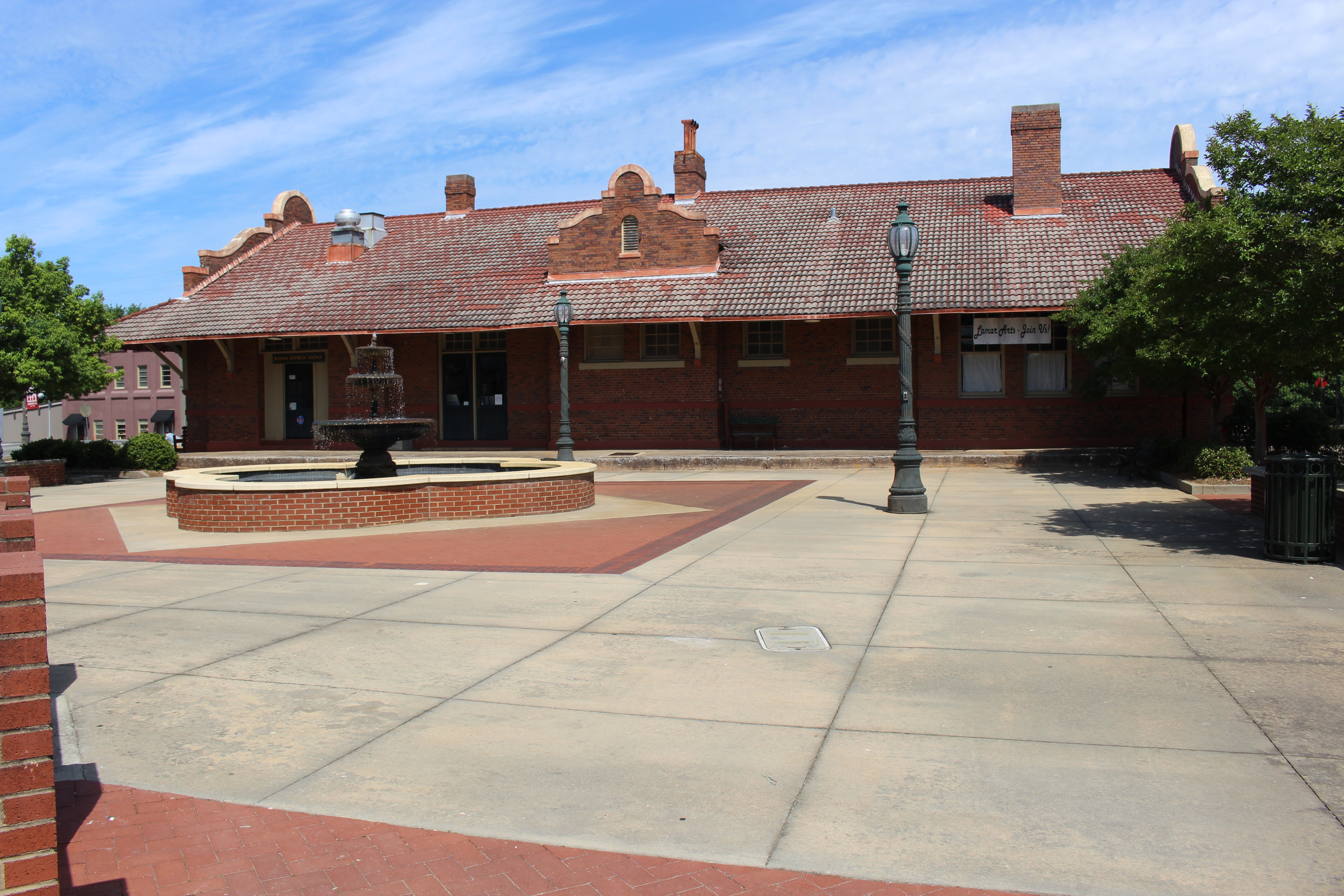

- Location within Georgia Location within the United States
- Location: Plaza Way and Main St., Barnesville, Georgia
- Coordinates: 33°3′16″N 84°9′21″W
- Area: less than one acre
- Built: 1912
- Built by: Central of Georgia Railroad
- NRHP reference No.: 86000916
- Added to NRHP: April 30, 1986

The Barnesville Depot is a historic site in Barnesville, Georgia. It was added to the National Register of Historic Places on April 30, 1986. It is located at Plaza Way and Main Street. The station was constructed in 1912 for the Central of Georgia Railway. It is located at the junction of the Central's former Macon-Atlanta mainline and its branch to Thomaston, Georgia. The building includes Spanish or Mission architecture (red roof tile, tall chimney pots, and curvilinear gables) and replaced an earlier stone depot constructed in 1852 by the Macon & Western Railroad. It is now used as an arts center.

The last train was the Central of Georgia's Nancy Hanks. The Louisville and Nashville Railroad's Dixie Limited also made a stop there.

== See also ==
- National Register of Historic Places listings in Lamar County, Georgia

| Preceding station | Central of Georgia Railway | Following station |
|---|---|---|
| Milner toward Atlanta | Main Line | Goggins toward Savannah |
| Staffords toward Thomaston | Thomaston – Barnesville | Terminus |
