= Craig Ogletree =

American football player (1968–2021)

No. 52, 94
- Position: Linebacker

Personal information
- Born: April 2, 1968; Barnesville, Georgia, U.S.
- Died: August 9, 2021 (aged 53)
- Listed height: 6 ft 2 in (1.88 m)
- Listed weight: 236 lb (107 kg)

Career information
- High school: Lamar County (Barnesville)
- College: Auburn
- NFL draft: 1990: 7th round, 177th overall pick

Career history
- Cincinnati Bengals (1990); Birmingham Fire (1992)

Awards and highlights
- First-team All-SEC (1989)
- Stats at Pro Football Reference

Craig Algernon Ogletree (April 2, 1968 – August 9, 2021) was an American professional football player who was a linebacker in the National Football League (NFL).

Ogletree was drafted in the seventh round by and played for the Cincinnati Bengals in 1990. He died from complications of COVID-19 on August 9, 2021.

== Combine results ==
Pre-draft measurables
Height	Weight	Arm length	Hand span	40-yard dash	10-yard split	20-yard split	20-yard shuttle	Vertical jump	Broad jump	Bench press
6 ft 1 in (1.85 m)	231 lb (105 kg)	30 3/8 in (0.77 m)	9 3/8 in (0.24 m)	4.94 s	1.72 s	2.80 s	4.53 s	29.0 in (0.74 m)	9 ft 0 in (2.74 m)	15 reps
All values from NFL Combine
