= Benjamin Gachet House =

Historic house in Georgia, United States

- U.S. National Register of Historic Places
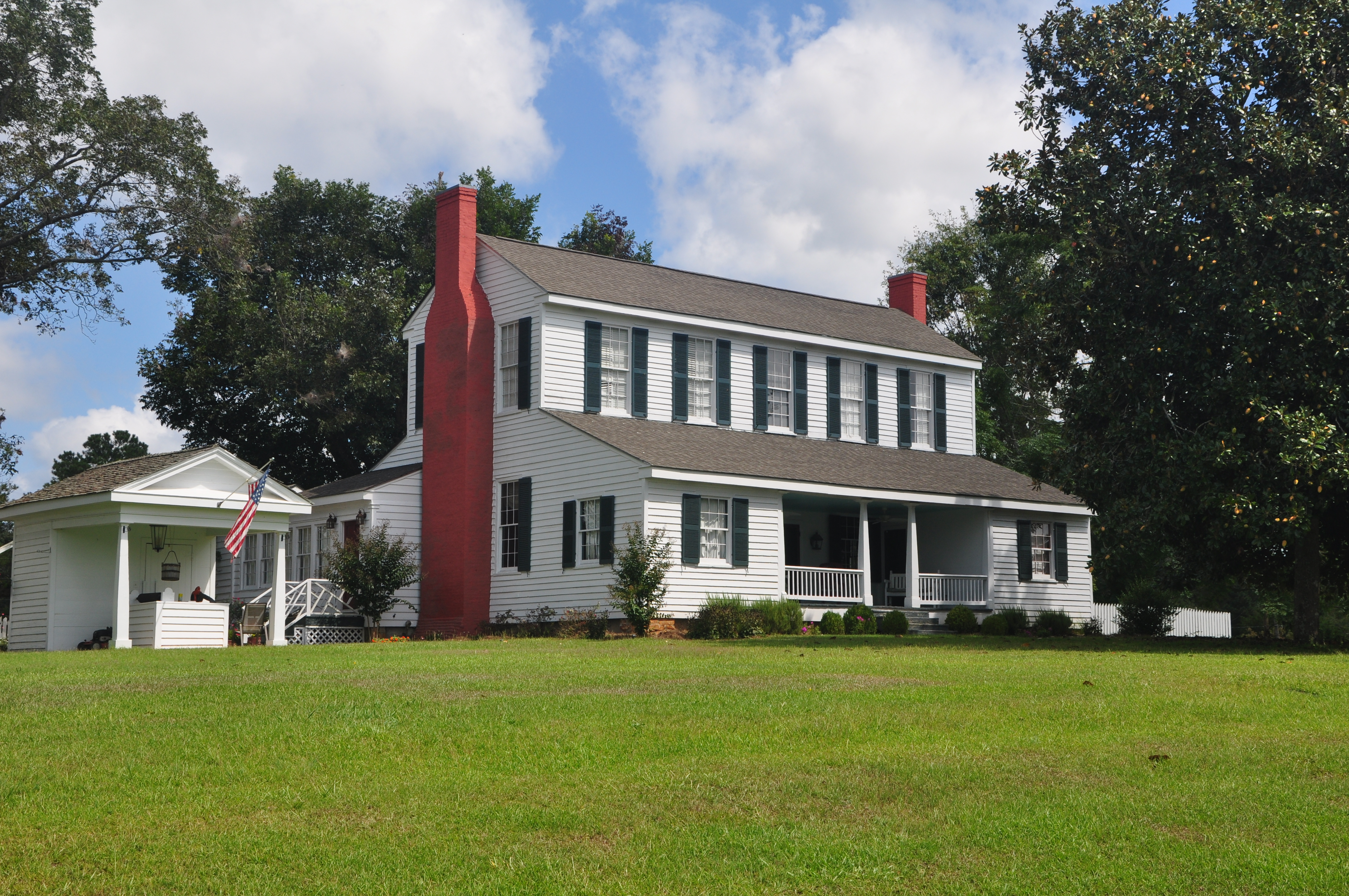
- Gachet House

- Location within Georgia Location within the United States
- Nearest city: Barnesville, Georgia, US
- Coordinates: 33.061515°N 84.208354°W
- Area: 65 acres (26 ha)
- Built: 1821
- Architectural style: plantation plan
- NRHP reference No.: 97000301
- Added to NRHP: April 17, 1997

The Benjamin Gachet House (/ɡæˈʃeɪ/, historically spelled Gachette) is a historic residence on GA 18, three miles west of Barnesville, Georgia, United States. It was added to the National Register of Historic Places on April 17, 1997. The home is located at the crossing of Five Points Road and Piedmont Road, now known as the Milner Cross Roads, originally used as trails by Native American tribes.

== The General LaFayette connection ==
Benjamin Gachet was a French nobleman who fled from a revolution in San Domingo and settled in what is now Lamar County. A historical marker dedicated by the Lamar-LaFayette Chapter of N.S.D.A.R. is at the site, stating that General Marquis de LaFayette stayed with Gachet at the home on March 19, 1825, during an official visit to Georgia.

Additionally, Benjamin Gachet lived in Jones county adjacent to Baldwin county, where Milledgeville was being visited by General LaFayette in 1825. Historians surmise that the general visited Gachet around that time and location.

So a family connection existed between the Gachets and the LaFayettes.

== Home ==
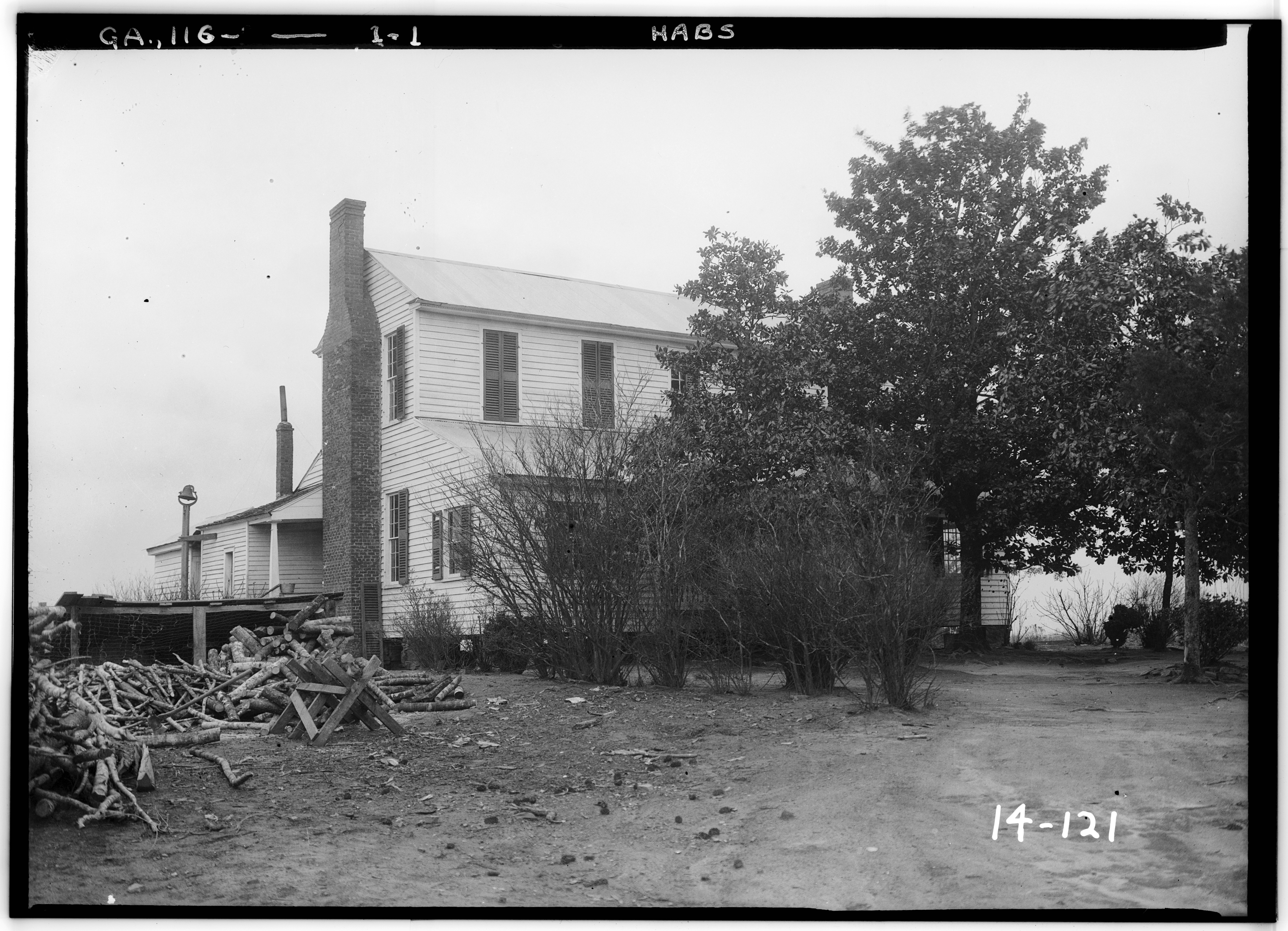
March 1934 FRONT VIEW

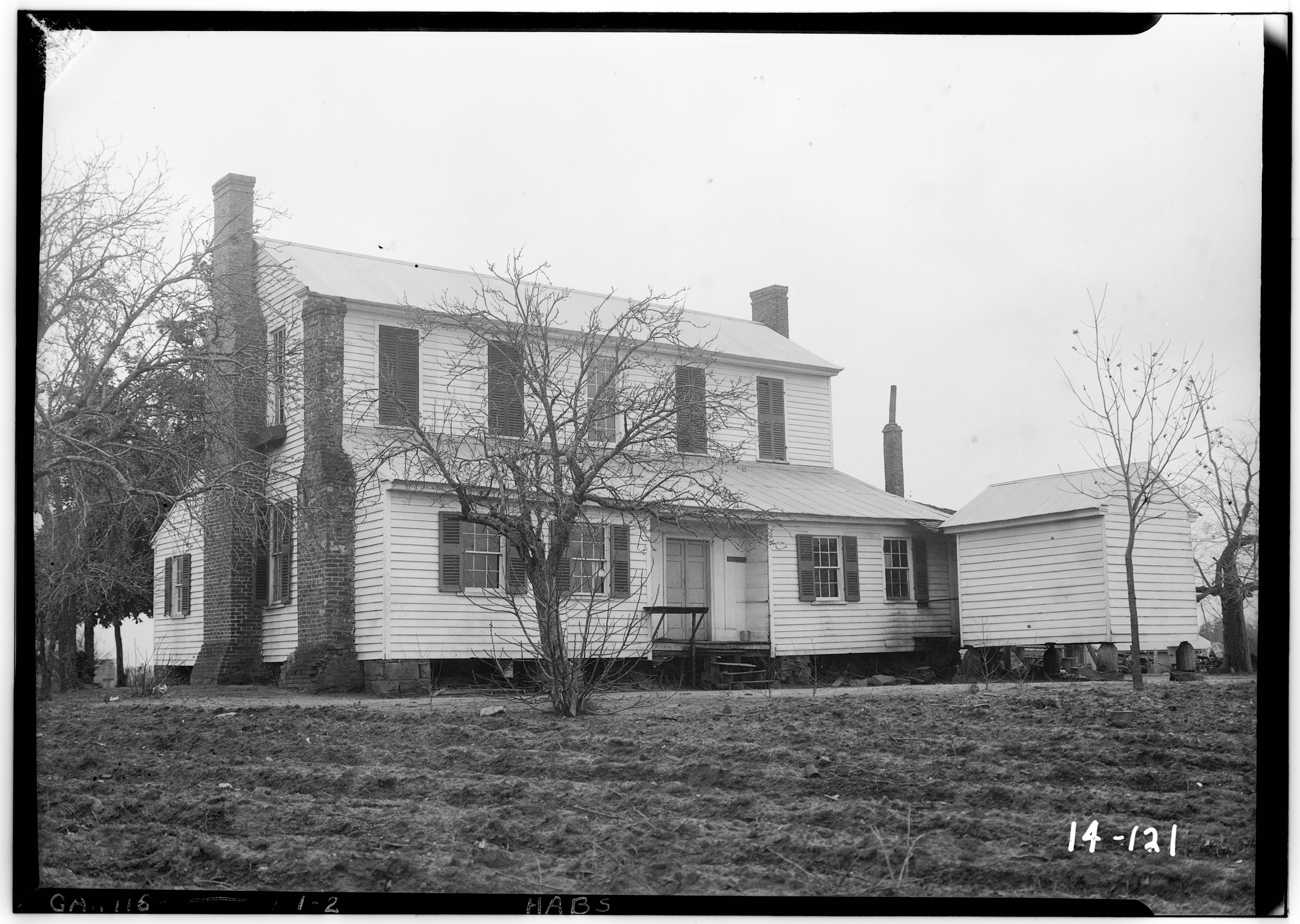
March 1934 REAR VIEW

The home was placed on the register, in part, due to it being an almost pristine example of plantation plan architecture. The chimneys and much of the clapboards are original. The kitchen, on the back of the house, off of the porch, was rebuilt. The two front bedrooms originally had separate entrances for each. The rooms have been referred to as "traveler's rooms", "preacher rooms" and "stranger's rooms". The Gachet house was known as a stagecoach stop in its history. Benjamin Gachet died at age 36 leaving several minor children and Mrs. Gachet likely earned a living to support her children by operating this stagecoach stop.

Mrs. Gachet eventually sold the property to her son-in-law, Benjamin M. Milner, and moved to Alabama.

== See also ==
- National Register of Historic Places listings in Lamar County, Georgia
- Visit of the Marquis de Lafayette to the United States
- Gilbert du Motier, Marquis de Lafayette

== Notes ==
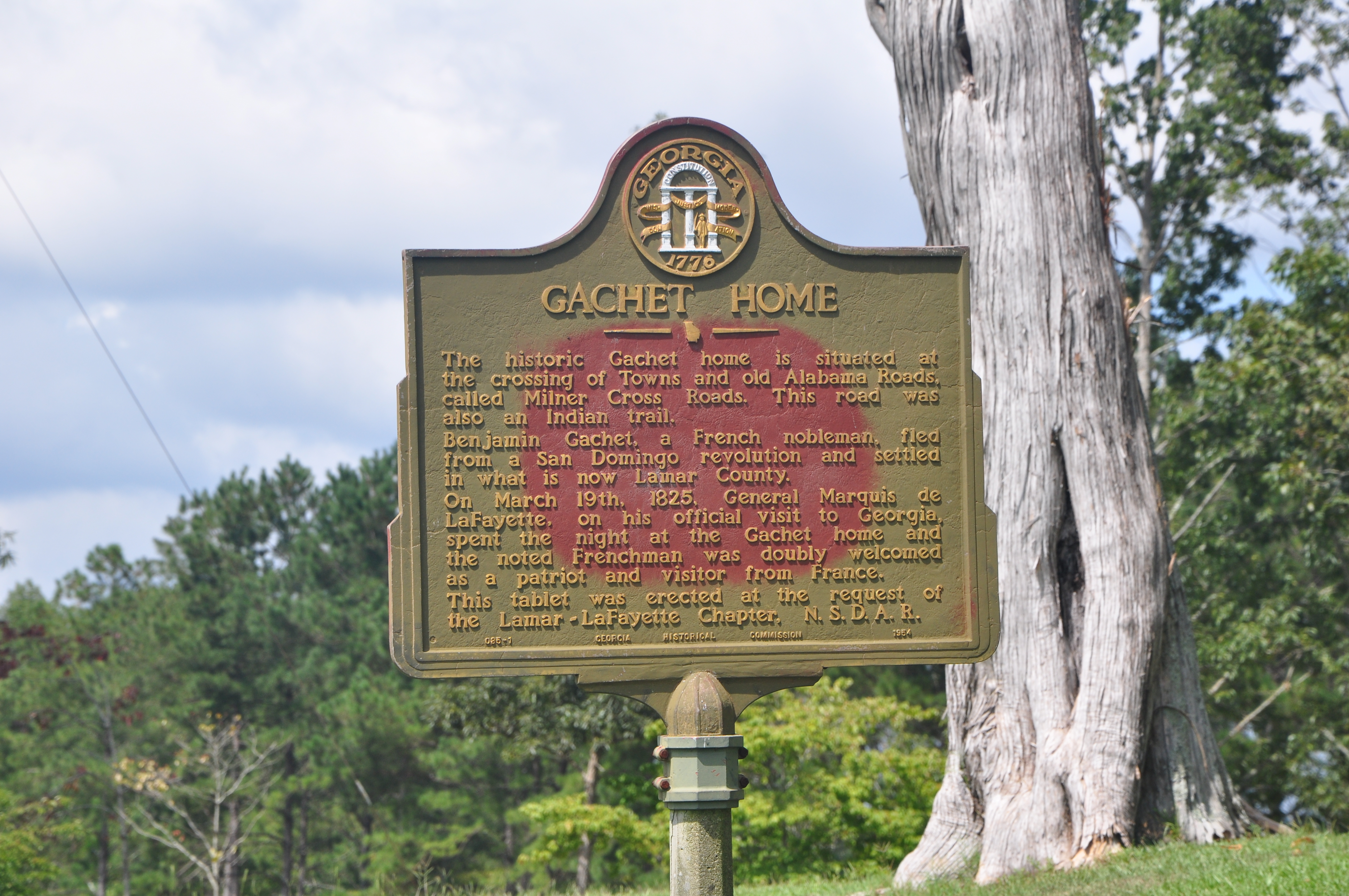
NSDAR Sign

=== Photos at NRHP induction ===
NRHP photos

=== Line drawings ===
- Sketch plan
- Home (1 of 3)
- Home (2 of 3)
- Home (3 of 3)
