= Goggins, Georgia =

Unincorporated community in Georgia, U.S.

Coordinates: 33°04′33″N 84°05′31″W

Goggins is an unincorporated community in Lamar County, in the U.S. state of Georgia.

== History ==
Variant names have been "Goggans", "Goggans Station", "Goggansville", "Goggins Station", and "Gogginsville". A post office called Goggansville was established in 1875, and remained in operation until 1927. The community was named after the Goggins family, original owners of the town site.
