= Milner, Georgia =

- City
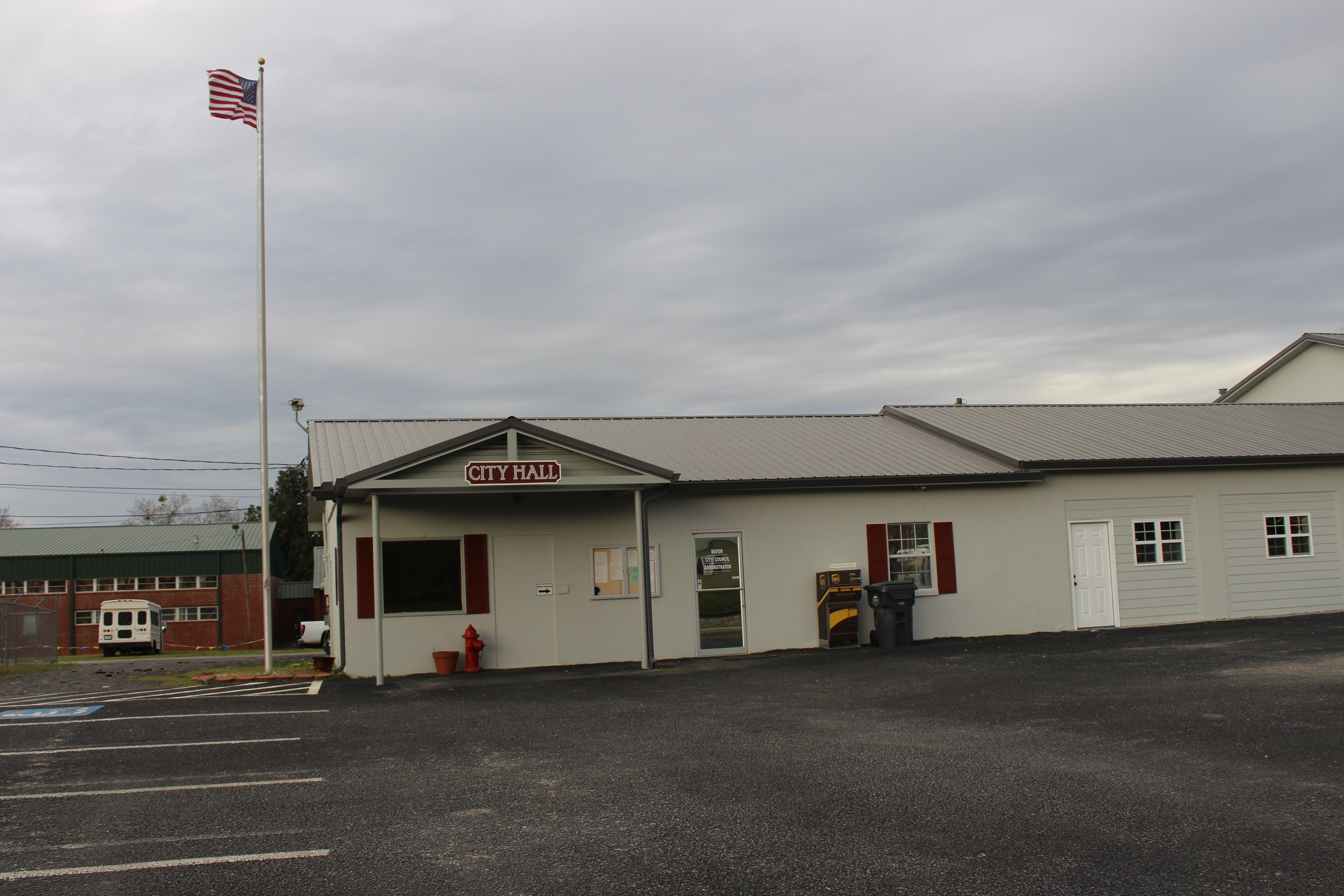
- City hall

- Location in Lamar County and the state of Georgia
- Coordinates: 33°6′47″N 84°11′42″W
- Country: United States
- State: Georgia
- County: Lamar

Area
  - Total: 2.12 sq mi (5.48 km^{2})
  - Land: 2.11 sq mi (5.46 km^{2})
  - Water: 0.0077 sq mi (0.02 km^{2})
- Elevation: 840 ft (256 m)

Population (2020)
  - Total: 772
  - Density: 366.4/sq mi (141.47/km^{2})
- Time zone: UTC-5 (Eastern (EST))
  - Summer (DST): UTC-4 (EDT)
- ZIP code: 30257
- Area code: 770
- FIPS code: 13-51604
- GNIS feature ID: 0332395
- Website: milnerga.gov

Milner is a city in Lamar County, Georgia, United States. As of the 2020 census, Milner had a population of 772. Milner is part of Metro Atlanta.

== History ==
The community founded in 1842 and was named after Willis R Milner, a pioneer citizen.

== Geography ==
Milner is located in northwestern Lamar County at 33°6′47″N 84°11′42″W (33.112941, -84.195017). U.S. Route 41 passes through the southwest side of the city, leading southeast 5 miles (8 km) to Barnesville, the Lamar county seat, and northwest 11 miles (18 km) to Griffin.

According to the United States Census Bureau, the city has a total area of 2.1 square miles (5.4 km^{2}), all land. The city sits on the Eastern Continental Divide, with the east side draining via Prairie Creek and Edie Creek to the Little Towaliga River, the Towaliga River, the Ocmulgee River, and ultimately the Atlantic Ocean, while the west side drains via Grape Creek to Potato Creek, the Flint River, and ultimately the Gulf of Mexico.

== Demographics ==
Historical population
Census	Pop.	Note	%±
1880	442		—
1900	440		—
1910	400		−9.1%
1920	407		1.8%
1930	329		−19.2%
1940	352		7.0%
1950	345		−2.0%
1960	305		−11.6%
1970	270		−11.5%
1980	320		18.5%
1990	321		0.3%
2000	522		62.6%
2010	610		16.9%
2020	772		26.6%
U.S. Decennial Census; 1850-1870 1880; 1890-1910 1920-1930; 1930-1940 1940-1950; 1960-1980 1990

Milner first appeared in the 1880 U.S. census and was part of Pike County until Lamar County was formed in 1920.

As of the census of 2000, there were 522 people, 189 households, and 145 families residing in the city. The population density was 372.0 inhabitants per square mile (143.6/km^{2}). There were 201 housing units at an average density of 143.2 per square mile (55.3/km^{2}). The racial makeup of the city was 72.61% White, 26.44% African American, 0.19% Native American, 0.57% Asian, and 0.19% from two or more races.

There were 189 households, out of which 34.4% had children under the age of 18 living with them, 59.3% were married couples living together, 15.3% had a female householder with no husband present, and 22.8% were non-families. 21.2% of all households were made up of individuals, and 7.9% had someone living alone who was 65 years of age or older. The average household size was 2.76 and the average family size was 3.19.

In the city, the population was spread out, with 27.2% under the age of 18, 10.2% from 18 to 24, 30.5% from 25 to 44, 22.0% from 45 to 64, and 10.2% who were 65 years of age or older. The median age was 34 years. For every 100 females, there were 89.8 males. For every 100 females age 18 and over, there were 87.2 males.

The median income for a household in the city was $42,222, and the median income for a family was $44,375. Males had a median income of $31,328 versus $19,625 for females. The per capita income for the city was $17,819. About 6.5% of families and 6.8% of the population were below the poverty line, including 10.9% of those under age 18 and 5.0% of those age 65 or over.
