= CJ Allen (American football) =

American football player (born 2005)

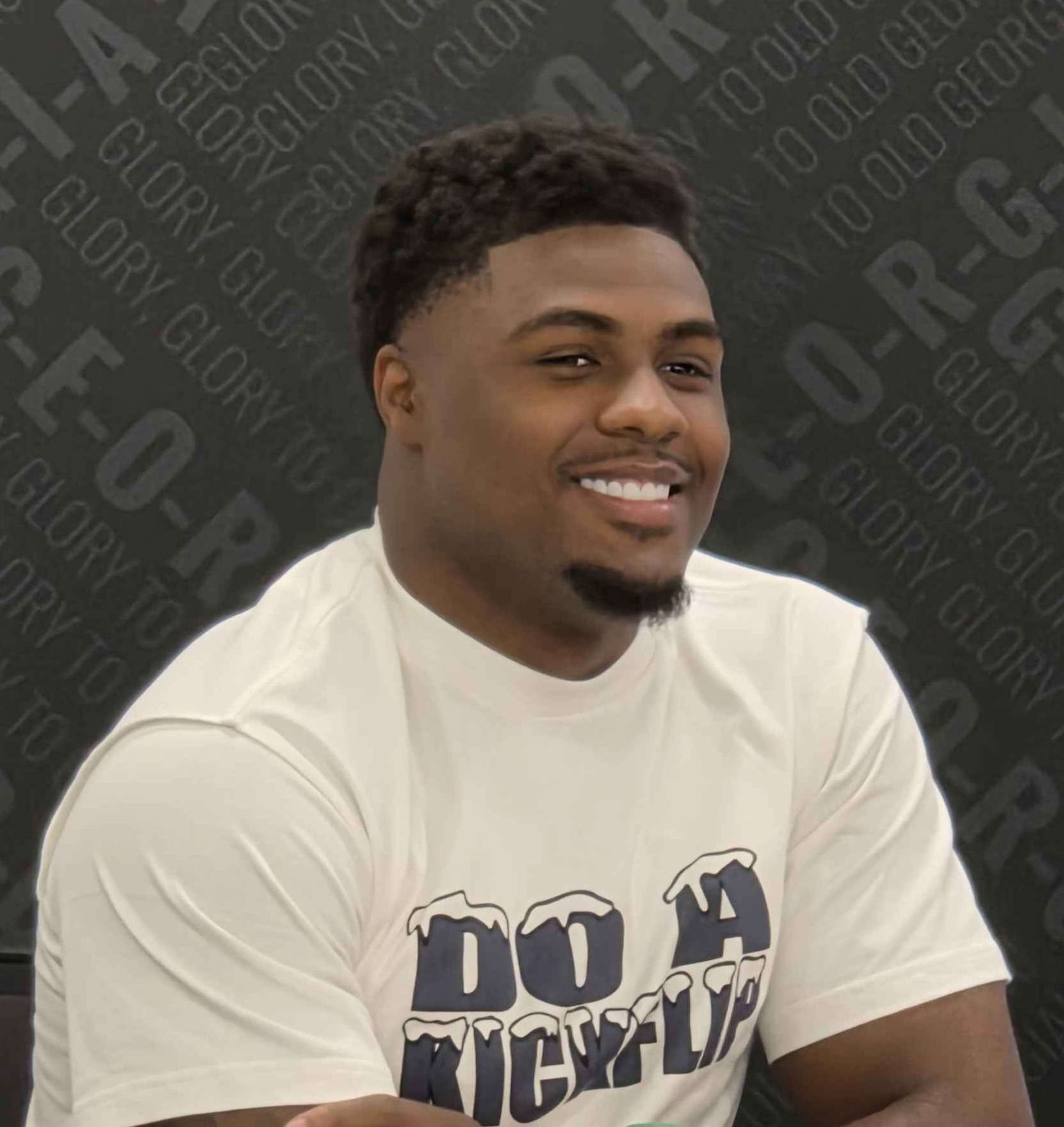
- Allen in 2026

No. 53 – Indianapolis Colts
- Position: Linebacker
- Roster status: Active

Personal information
- Born: March 1, 2005 (age 21)
- Listed height: 6 ft 1 in (1.85 m)
- Listed weight: 230 lb (104 kg)

Career information
- High school: Lamar County (Barnesville, Georgia)
- College: Georgia (2023–2025)
- NFL draft: 2026: 2nd round, 53rd overall pick

Career history
- Indianapolis Colts (2026–present)

Awards and highlights
- Consensus All-American (2025); First-team All-SEC (2025)

Career NFL statistics as of Week 10, 2026
- Tackles: 50
- Sacks: 2.0
- Pass deflections: 2
- Stats at Pro Football Reference

Christian Jamar Allen (born March 1, 2005) is an American professional football linebacker for the Indianapolis Colts of the National Football League (NFL). He played college football for the Georgia Bulldogs and was selected by the Colts in the second round of the 2026 NFL draft.

== Early life ==
Allen attended Lamar County High School in Barnesville, Georgia. He played both linebacker and running back in high school. As a senior, he had 84 tackles and a sack on defense and 1,628 rushing yards with 26 touchdowns on offense. Allen was selected to play in the 2023 All-American Bowl. He committed to the University of Georgia to play college football.

== College career ==
Allen started his true freshman season at Georgia in 2023 as a backup and became a starter after an injury to Jamon Dumas-Johnson. Overall, he started five of 14 games and had 41 tackles and one sack and was named freshman All-Southeastern Conference (SEC).

== Professional career ==
Pre-draft measurables
Height	Weight	Arm length	Hand span	Wingspan	40-yard dash	10-yard split	20-yard split
6 ft 0 3/4 in (1.85 m)	230 lb (104 kg)	31 1/2 in (0.80 m)	10 1/8 in (0.26 m)	6 ft 3 1/2 in (1.92 m)	4.47 s	1.62 s	2.71 s
All values from NFL Combine/Pro Day

Allen was selected by the Indianapolis Colts in the second round with the 53rd overall pick in the 2026 NFL draft. He signed his rookie contract on May 8.
