= Lamar County School District (Georgia) =

School district in Georgia (U.S. state)

Address
- 3 Trojan Way Barnesville, Georgia, 30204-1544; United States
- Coordinates: 33.084638°N 84.006958°W

District information
- Grades: Pre-Kindergarten – 12
- Superintendent: Jute Wilson
- Accreditation(s): Southern Association of Colleges and Schools; Georgia Accrediting Commission

Students and staff
- Enrollment: 2,820 (2022–23)
- Faculty: 174.50 (FTE)
- Student–teacher ratio: 16.16

Other information
- Telephone: (770) 358-5891
- Fax: (770) 358-5858
- Website: lamar.k12.ga.us

The Lamar County School District is a public school district in Lamar County, Georgia, United States, based in Barnesville. It serves the communities of Aldora, Barnesville, and Milner.

== Schools ==
The Lamar County School District has two elementary schools, one middle school, and one high school.

=== Elementary schools ===
- Lamar County Elementary School
- Lamar County Primary School

=== Middle school ===
- Lamar County Middle School

=== High school ===
- Lamar County Comprehensive High School
