= Lamar County Comprehensive High School =

Public high school in Barnesville, Georgia, United States

Lamar County High School
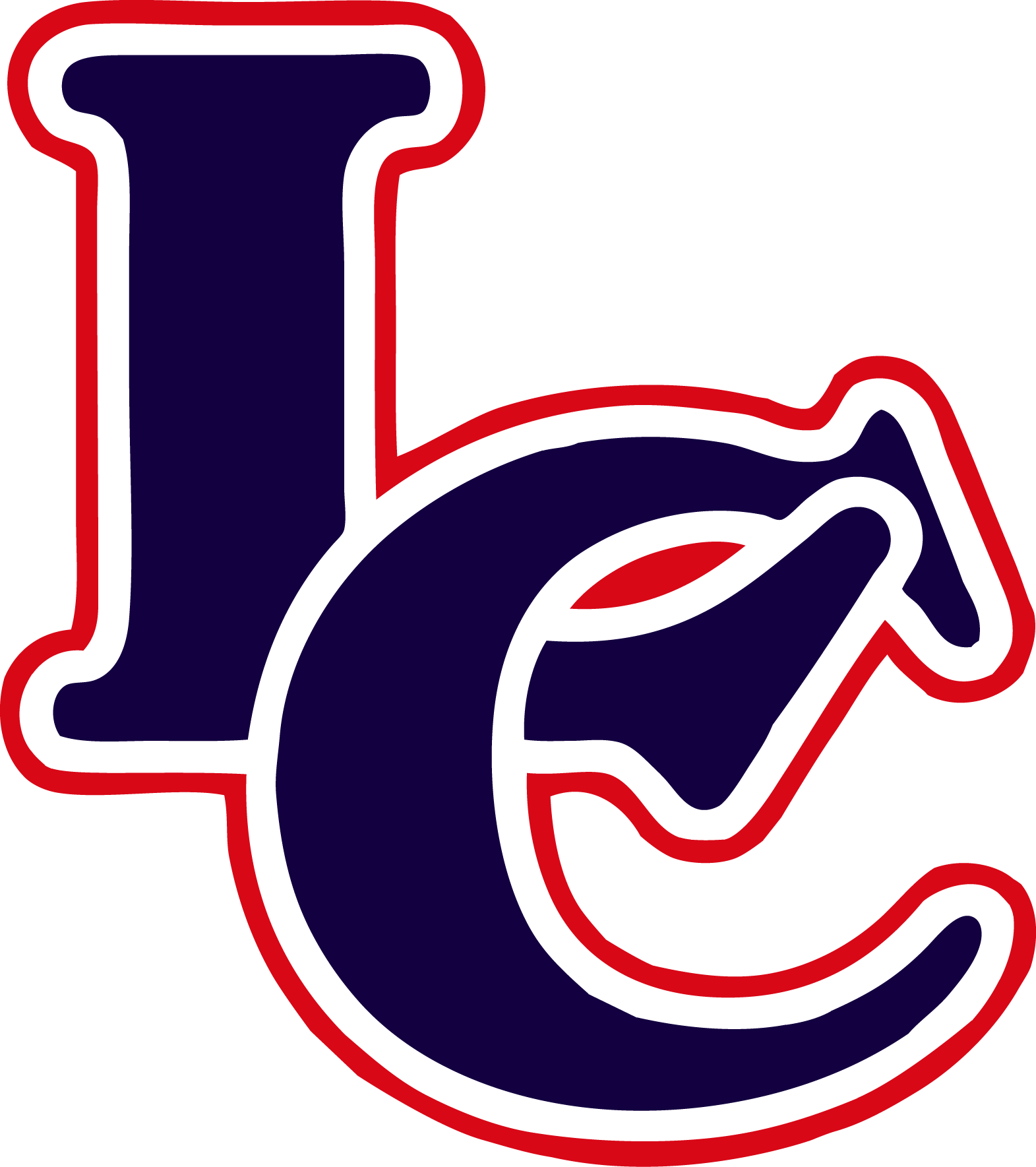
- 1 Trojan Way; Barnesville, Georgia 30204; United States

Information
- School type: Public high school
- Motto: "Poised to Lead"
- School board: Lamar County Board of Education
- School district: Lamar County School District
- School number: State 0175
- Principal: Jake Harris
- Teaching staff: 52.10 (FTE)
- Grades: 9 – 12
- Enrollment: 831 (2024–2025)
- Student to teacher ratio: 15.95
- Colors: Navy, red, and white
- Sports: Football, basketball, baseball, softball, cross-country, track and field, golf, tennis, soccer
- Mascot: Trojan
- Team name: Lamar County Trojans
- Website: lamar.k12.ga.us/o/lchs

Location in Georgia

Lamar County High School is a public high school located in Barnesville, Georgia, United States. The school is part of the Lamar County School District, which serves Lamar County.

== Academics ==
Lamar County High School has been recognized for its outstanding progress and commitment to education. The Georgia Department of Education has designated it a Title 1 Award School for Highest Progress in both 2012 and 2015, a distinction awarded to only the top 10% of Title 1 Schools in the state. Additionally, the school's faculty members have been named System Teacher of the Year for two consecutive years in 2012 and 2013.

Literary Award - First Place Region, 2012; two students took 2nd place at State, 2012

Academic Team - Second Place GATA State Varsity, 2013, Third Place GATA Junior Varsity, 2013

JROTC - The JROTC unit has maintained for three years its Honors with Distinction designation, and in 2011-2012 was the only JROTC unit from the State of Georgia to be selected to attend the national academic bowl in Washington, DC.

== Arts and sciences ==
Science Fair Award - two Regional First Place awards, 2012

Concert Band - Excellent Rating, GMEA Festival, 2011 and 2012; Superior Rating, Shamrock Festival, 2013

Marching Band - Outstanding Performance Award, Fort Valley State University Marching Jamboree, 2011; Most Outstanding Student Woodwind Award, Southern University Summer Band Camp, 2012; Overall Best Camper Student Award, Southern University Summer Band Camp, 2012; Majorettes, First Place, Alabama State University Band Camp, 2012; Flag Line, Division Second Place, Alabama State University Band Camp, 2012

Choral - two students chosen for the 2013 Georgia All-State Chorus and 2013 NafME All National Honor Ensemble

== Athletics ==
Coaching - Athletic Director Calvin Scandrett, was AD of the year in Region AA, 2012.

Soccer - boys' and girls' soccer teams qualified for state playoffs, 2012

Baseball - boys' baseball qualified for state playoff, 2012

Tennis - girls' tennis team qualified for state playoffs, 2012; boys' tennis team was regional runner-up, 2012

JROTC Drill Team - qualified for state competition 2012

JROTC Color Guard - qualified for state competition 2012

Cross country - qualified for state competition, 2011 and 2012; Student individual First Place Region AA, 2011; Student individual medal, Footlocker South Regionals, 2012; Student individual selected for All Middle Georgia Cross Country Team, 2012; Ten Individual students won All Region Cross Country, 2011 and 2012

Track - Region 4AA Boys' Track Champion, 2012; Boys' 4x100 State AA Champions

Volleyball - The four-year-old women's volleyball team advanced to state playoffs for the first time, 2013-2014

Football - Region 4AA Champion Varsity Football and State Semi-Finalist, 2012

Football - The Trojans football team played their first game on Saturday, September 5, 1970, beating Morrow High School 6–0.

== Notable alumni ==
- CJ Allen, college football player
