= Jessie Carney Smith =

American librarian and educator (born 1930)

- Born: Jessie Carney; September 24, 1930 (age 95); Greensboro, North Carolina, U.S.
- Education: North Carolina Agricultural and Technical State University, Michigan State University, University of Illinois at Urbana–Champaign
- Occupations: Librarian, author, educator
- Awards: Martin Luther King Black Authors Award (1982); National Women's Book Association Award (1992); Candace Award for excellence in education (1992)

Jessie Carney Smith (born September 24, 1930) is an American librarian and educator, formerly Dean of the Fisk University Library and Camille Cosby Distinguished Chair in the Humanities. She was the first African American to earn a Ph.D. degree in library science from the University of Illinois. She is also a scholar and author of research guides and reference books focusing on notable African-American people.

== Early life ==
Jessie Carney was born on September 24, 1930, in Greensboro, North Carolina, to James Ampler Carney and Vesona (Bigelow) Carney. She attended James B. Dudley High School in Greensboro.

She graduated from North Carolina A&T State University with her B.S. degree in home economics in 1950. Smith received her M.A. degree in child development from Michigan State University in 1956, and her M.A.L.S. degree from the George Peabody College of Vanderbilt University in 1957. Smith was one of the first African-American students to integrate the Peabody College library program.

== Career ==
Smith began working as a clerk typist for Fisk University's religion and English departments in 1956, then transferring to the library. She worked up to being assistant to the head librarian, Arna Bontemps, who was the first Black person to hold that position, and he encouraged her to become his replacement.

Smith began working as an instructor and library cataloger at Tennessee State University in 1957. She enrolled in a Ph.D. program at the University of Illinois in 1960, and became the first African American to earn a Ph.D. degree in library science from the University of Illinois in 1964. Smith was hired as a professor of library science at the university library of Fisk University in Nashville, Tennessee, in 1965. She also replaced Bontemps as head librarian, becoming the first Black woman to hold the position.

In the fall of 1969, Fisk replaced the Erastus Milo Cravath Memorial Library with the new 1.4 million- dollar Fisk University Library. Smith helped with the design and planning of the new library, and ran the move of their collections. She held workshops on topics such as black studies, civil rights, and geneaology, and taught library science at the University of Tennessee, Alabama A&M University, and Vanderbilt University.

In 2008, Smith made Fisk University home to the largest single collection of papers concerning the Rosenwald School building program. She initiated the process to establish an online portal, the Julius Rosenwald Fund Archive database, which was launched in 2025.

Smith was awarded Fisk University's Camille Cosby Distinguished Chair in the Humanities in 1992. Smith was appointed dean of the Fisk University library in 2010. In 2020, she retired.

Smith has served as consultant to the U.S. Office for Civil Rights, the U.S. Office of Education, the National Endowment for the Humanities, and the Southern Association of Colleges and Schools.

Smith has published numerous research guides and reference books, specifically exploring the gaps in scholarship around African Americans. She has published three separate volumes of Notable Black American Women (in 1991, 1996, and 2003) and two separate volumes of Notable Black American Men (in 1999 and 2006). Her other books include Black Heroes of the Twentieth Century, Freedom Facts and Firsts: 400 Years of the African American Civil Rights Experience, and Black Firsts: 4000 Groundbreaking and Pioneering Historical Events, among others. She wrote or edited more than 30 books in total.

== Awards and recognition ==
Smith is best known for her work as an African-American studies scholar, and has received a number of awards for her work in libraries and as an author. She was awarded the Martin Luther King Black Authors Award in 1982 and the National Women's Book Association Award in 1992. She received the Candace Award for excellence in education in 1992, and distinguished alumni awards from both the Peabody College of Vanderbilt University and the University of Illinois. Smith was named the Academic/Research Librarian of the Year from the Association of College and Research Libraries in 1985, and in 1997 Smith received the key to the city of Oak Ridge, Tennessee.

In 2020, upon her retirement, Smith was granted the title of Librarian Emerita by Fisk University.

== Selected works ==
- Originals!: Black Women Breaking Barriers. 2022. Canton, Michigan: Visible Ink Press.
- Smith, Jessie Carney, Linda T. Wynn and Lean'tin L. Bracks. 2015. The Complete Encyclopedia of African American History. Canton, Michigan: Visible Ink Press.
- The Complete Encyclopedia of African American History. Heroes and Heroines. 2014 A reference library ed. Chanfont Pennsylvania: African American Publications.
- Smith, Jessie Carney, and Linda T. Wynn. 2009. Freedom Facts and Firsts: 400 Years of the African American Civil Rights Experience. Canton, Michigan: Visible Ink Press.
- Epic Lives : One Hundred Black Women Who Made a Difference. 1993. Detroit: Visible Ink Press.
- Images of Blacks in American Culture : A Reference Guide to Information Sources. 1988. New York: Greenwood Press.
