= Lamar County, Georgia =

County in Georgia, United States

- County
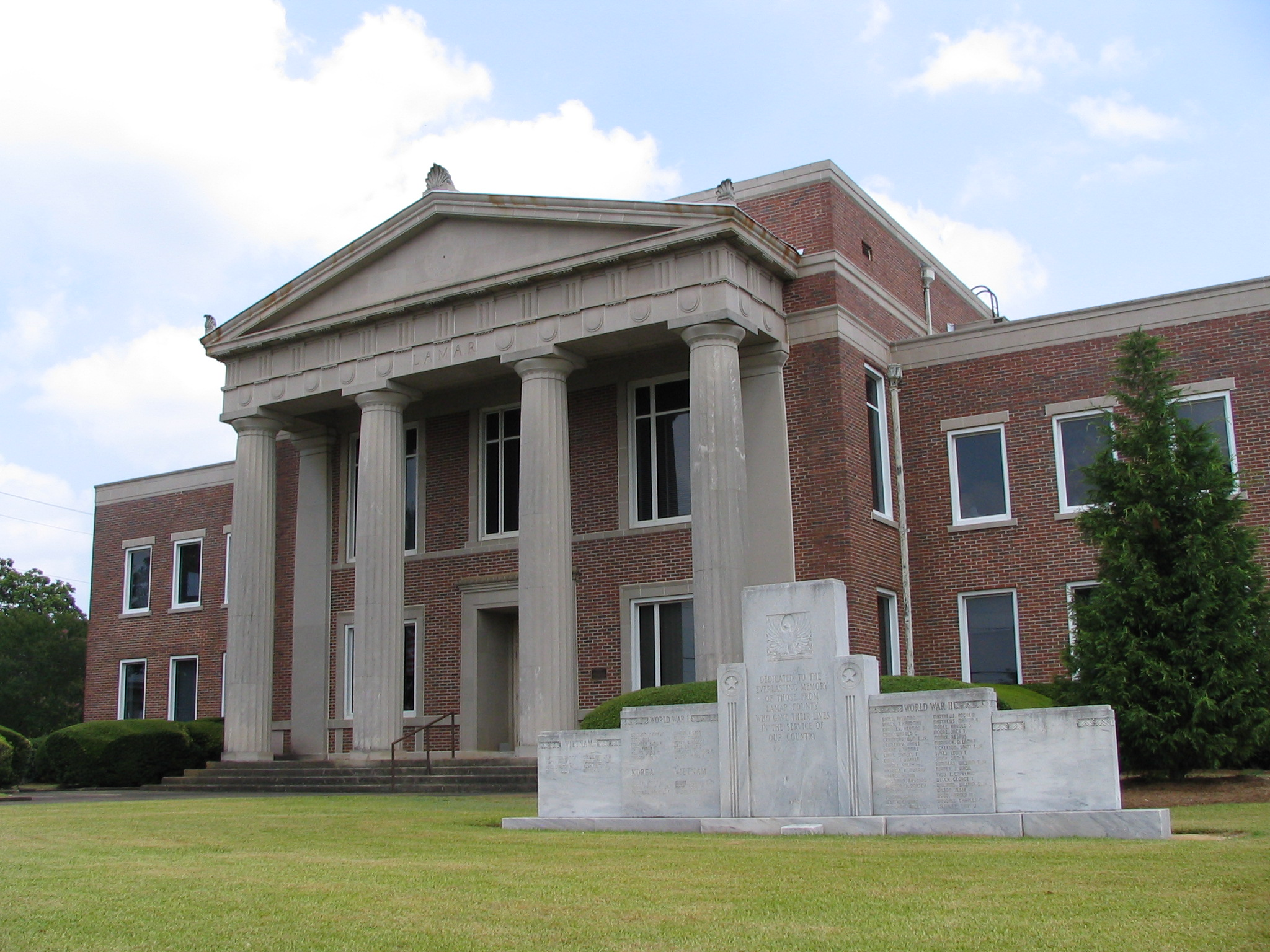
- Lamar County courthouse in Barnesville

- Logo

- Location within the U.S. state of Georgia
- Coordinates: 33°04′N 84°08′W
- Country: United States
- State: Georgia
- Founded: 1920; 106 years ago
- Named for: Lucius Quintus Cincinnatus Lamar II
- Seat: Barnesville
- Largest city: Barnesville

Area
  - Total: 186 sq mi (480 km^{2})
  - Land: 184 sq mi (480 km^{2})
  - Water: 2.3 sq mi (6.0 km^{2}) 1.3%

Population (2020)
  - Total: 18,500
  - Estimate (2025): 20,941 ▲
  - Density: 101/sq mi (39/km^{2})
- Time zone: UTC−5 (Eastern)
  - Summer (DST): UTC−4 (EDT)
- Congressional district: 3rd
- Website: lamarcountyga.com

Lamar County is a county in the West Central region of the U.S. state of Georgia. As of the 2020 census, the population was 18,500. The county seat is Barnesville.

== History ==
The Georgia General Assembly proposed the constitutional amendment to create the county on August 17, 1920, and the citizens of the state voted in favor of the amendment on November 2, 1920. Land from Pike County and Monroe County was then transferred to create Lamar County. Lamar County was named after Confederate Democrat Lucius Quintus Cincinnatus Lamar II.

== Geography ==
According to the U.S. Census Bureau, the county has a total area of 186 square miles (480 km^{2}), of which 184 square miles (480 km^{2}) is land and 2.3 square miles (6.0 km^{2}) (1.3%) is water. It is located in the Piedmont region of the state.

The western third of Lamar County, west of a line from Orchard Hill through Milner and Barnesville, is located in the Upper Flint River sub-basin of the ACF River Basin (Apalachicola-Chattahoochee-Flint River Basin). The eastern majority of the county is located in the Upper Ocmulgee River sub-basin of the Altamaha River basin.

=== Major highways ===
- Interstate 75
- U.S. Route 41
- U.S. Route 341
- State Route 7
- State Route 18
- State Route 36
- State Route 109
- State Route 401 (unsigned designation for I-75)

=== Adjacent counties ===
- Butts County (northeast)
- Monroe County (east)
- Upson County (southwest)
- Pike County (west)
- Spalding County (northwest)

== Communities ==
=== Cities ===
- Barnesville (county seat)
- Milner

=== Towns ===
- Aldora
- Goggins

== Demographics ==
Historical population
Census	Pop.	Note	%±
1930	9,745		—
1940	10,091		3.6%
1950	10,242		1.5%
1960	10,240		0.0%
1970	10,688		4.4%
1980	12,215		14.3%
1990	13,038		6.7%
2000	15,912		22.0%
2010	18,317		15.1%
2020	18,500		1.0%
2025 (est.)	20,941	▲	13.2%
U.S. Decennial Census; 1790-1880 1890-1910; 1920-1930 1930-1940; 1940-1950 1960-1980; 1980-2000 2010 2020

=== Racial and ethnic composition ===
Lamar County, Georgia – Racial and ethnic composition Note: the US Census treats Hispanic/Latino as an ethnic category. This table excludes Latinos from the racial categories and assigns them to a separate category. Hispanics/Latinos may be of any race.
Race / Ethnicity (NH = Non-Hispanic)	Pop 1980	Pop 1990	Pop 2000	Pop 2010	Pop 2020	% 1980	% 1990	% 2000	% 2010	% 2020
White alone (NH)	7,909	8,517	10,683	11,943	12,344	64.75%	65.32%	67.14%	65.20%	66.72%
Black or African American alone (NH)	4,122	4,442	4,806	5,621	4,888	33.75%	34.07%	30.20%	30.69%	26.42%
Native American or Alaska Native alone (NH)	8	19	42	34	13	0.07%	0.15%	0.26%	0.19%	0.07%
Asian alone (NH)	10	11	59	68	102	0.08%	0.08%	0.37%	0.37%	0.55%
Native Hawaiian or Pacific Islander alone (NH)	x	x	1	2	4	x	x	0.01%	0.01%	0.02%
Other race alone (NH)	14	0	14	22	48	0.11%	0.00%	0.09%	0.12%	0.26%
Mixed race or Multiracial (NH)	x	x	135	286	626	x	x	0.85%	1.56%	3.38%
Hispanic or Latino (any race)	152	49	172	341	475	1.24%	0.38%	1.08%	1.86%	2.57%
Total	12,215	13,038	15,912	18,317	18,500	100.00%	100.00%	100.00%	100.00%	100.00%

=== 2020 census ===
As of the 2020 census, there were 18,500 people, 6,897 households, and 3,746 families residing in the county.

The median age was 40.2 years, 21.4% of residents were under the age of 18, and 18.3% of residents were 65 years of age or older. For every 100 females there were 92.0 males, and for every 100 females age 18 and over there were 89.0 males age 18 and over.

36.9% of residents lived in urban areas, while 63.1% lived in rural areas.

The racial makeup of the county was 67.4% White, 26.6% Black or African American, 0.1% American Indian and Alaska Native, 0.6% Asian, 0.0% Native Hawaiian and Pacific Islander, 1.1% from some other race, and 4.2% from two or more races. Hispanic or Latino residents of any race comprised 2.6% of the population.

There were 6,897 households in the county, of which 31.5% had children under the age of 18 living with them and 29.3% had a female householder with no spouse or partner present. About 25.9% of all households were made up of individuals and 12.5% had someone living alone who was 65 years of age or older.

There were 7,561 housing units, of which 8.8% were vacant. Among occupied housing units, 69.3% were owner-occupied and 30.7% were renter-occupied. The homeowner vacancy rate was 1.4% and the rental vacancy rate was 6.3%.

== Politics ==
As of the 2020s, Lamar County is a strongly Republican voting county, voting 72.75% for Donald Trump in 2024. For elections to the United States House of Representatives, Lamar County is part of Georgia's 3rd congressional district, currently represented by Brian Jack. For elections to the Georgia State Senate, Lamar County is part of District 16. For elections to the Georgia House of Representatives, Lamar County is part of districts 134 and 135.

United States presidential election results for Lamar County, Georgia
Year	Republican		Democratic		Third party(ies)	
Year	No.	%	No.	%	No.	%
1924	38	5.72%	594	89.46%	32	4.82%
1928	126	15.79%	672	84.21%	0	0.00%
1932	33	4.38%	714	94.69%	7	0.93%
1936	69	7.59%	839	92.30%	1	0.11%
1940	85	8.86%	869	90.62%	5	0.52%
1944	143	12.35%	1,015	87.65%	0	0.00%
1948	164	12.92%	909	71.63%	196	15.45%
1952	429	21.66%	1,552	78.34%	0	0.00%
1956	555	26.61%	1,531	73.39%	0	0.00%
1960	479	26.00%	1,363	74.00%	0	0.00%
1964	1,570	50.30%	1,548	49.60%	3	0.10%
1968	575	20.50%	790	28.16%	1,440	51.34%
1972	1,844	73.47%	666	26.53%	0	0.00%
1976	847	23.32%	2,785	76.68%	0	0.00%
1980	1,298	33.91%	2,453	64.08%	77	2.01%
1984	2,198	57.80%	1,605	42.20%	0	0.00%
1988	2,035	57.83%	1,416	40.24%	68	1.93%
1992	1,707	38.71%	2,065	46.83%	638	14.47%
1996	1,988	43.75%	2,125	46.76%	431	9.49%
2000	2,912	55.68%	2,194	41.95%	124	2.37%
2004	4,027	61.96%	2,432	37.42%	40	0.62%
2008	4,873	63.24%	2,752	35.72%	80	1.04%
2012	4,899	64.36%	2,602	34.18%	111	1.46%
2016	5,190	67.87%	2,270	29.68%	187	2.45%
2020	6,331	69.99%	2,620	28.97%	94	1.04%
2024	7,575	72.75%	2,795	26.84%	42	0.40%

United States Senate election results for Lamar County, Georgia2
Year	Republican		Democratic		Third party(ies)	
Year	No.	%	No.	%	No.	%
2020	6,280	69.87%	2,511	27.94%	197	2.19%
2020	5,588	70.00%	2,395	30.00%	0	0.00%

United States Senate election results for Lamar County, Georgia3
Year	Republican		Democratic		Third party(ies)	
Year	No.	%	No.	%	No.	%
2020	3,243	36.30%	1,994	22.32%	3,697	41.38%
2020	5,558	69.60%	2,428	30.40%	0	0.00%
2022	5,416	70.22%	2,139	27.73%	158	2.05%
2022	4,910	70.97%	2,008	29.03%	0	0.00%

Georgia Gubernatorial election results for Lamar County
Year	Republican		Democratic		Third party(ies)	
Year	No.	%	No.	%	No.	%
2022	5,736	73.97%	1,963	25.31%	56	0.72%

== Education ==
All of the county is in the Lamar County School District.

== See also ==
- National Register of Historic Places listings in Lamar County, Georgia
- List of counties in Georgia
