= Notable Black American Women =

Reference book

Notable Black American Women is a three-volume series by Jessie Carney Smith profiling 1,100 Black American women. The first volume, with 500 profiles, was published in 1992, the second in 1994, and the third in 2003, all by Gale. Smith spent more than twenty years researching for the book.

== Writing and publication ==
Jessie Carney Smith was a professor at Fisk University who also worked as a librarian. For twenty years she researched Black women as she worked, recording information she came across. She developed this information into a list of 1,000 women and over the course of two years built the first volume, with more than two hundred people helping. Smith later said that she woke up between 4:00 and 4:30 in the morning every day, worked until 6:00 before leaving for work, where she continued to research. The first volume of Notable Black American Women was completed in December 1991 and published by Gale. Book one contained five hundred profiles, was 1,334 pages long, and weighed six pounds, but by February 1992 she already had three hundred names for inclusion in book two, which was set for publication in 1997, again by Gale. She condensed the volume into Epic Lives: One Hundred Black Women Who Made a Difference, which was published by Visible Ink Press.

The second volume was actually published in 1994. Volume three was published in 2003, bringing the total of women profiled to 1,100. The third book included an index divided geographically and by occupation and subject covering all three volumes.

== Reception ==
A reviewer of the first volume considered the profiles "extensive" and "well written" and concluded that it was "an outstanding volume". A review of the third volume called the series "excellent".
