= Potato Creek (Flint River tributary) =

Stream in Georgia, United States

Coordinates: 32°46′56.49″N 84°20′57.71″W

Potato Creek is a stream in the U.S. state of Georgia. It is a tributary to the Flint River.

Potato Creek's name most likely is a preservation of its native Creek-language name.
