= Barnesville, Georgia =

City in Georgia, United States

- City
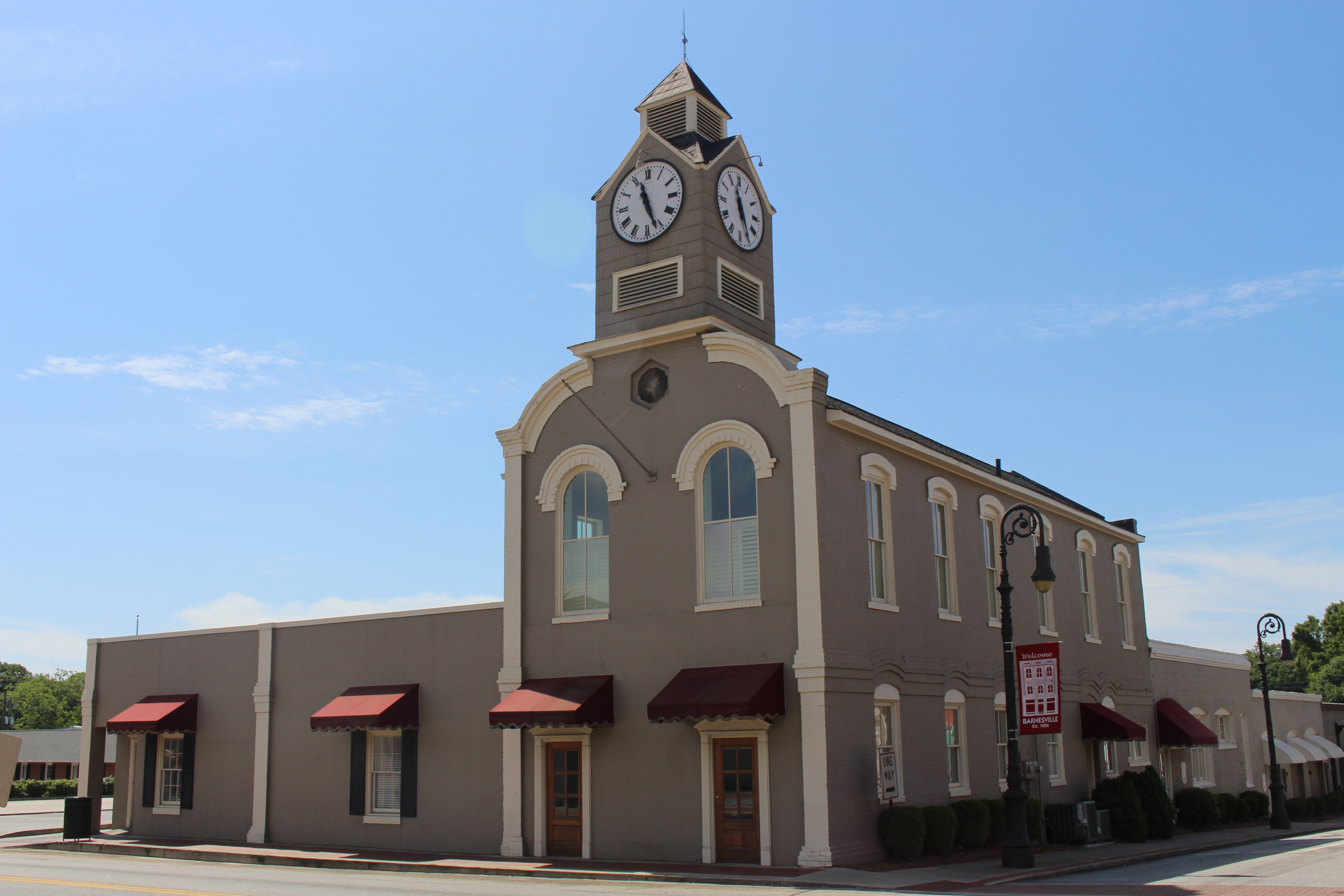
- Barnesville City Hall

- Flag Logo
- Nickname: Buggy Town
- Location in Lamar County and the state of Georgia
- Coordinates: 33°3′11″N 84°9′22″W
- Country: United States
- State: Georgia
- County: Lamar
- Barnes' Store: 1826
- Barnesville: June 1831
- Incorporated City of Barnesville: February 20, 1854

Government
  - Type: City Council
  - City Manager: Timothy Turner

Area
  - Total: 6.12 sq mi (15.86 km^{2})
  - Land: 6.07 sq mi (15.73 km^{2})
  - Water: 0.046 sq mi (0.12 km^{2})
- Elevation: 850 ft (259 m)

Population (2020)
  - Total: 6,292
  - Density: 1,035.9/sq mi (399.95/km^{2})
- Time zone: UTC-5 (Eastern (EST))
  - Summer (DST): UTC-4 (EDT)
- ZIP code: 30204
- Area code: 770
- FIPS code: 13-05344
- GNIS feature ID: 0331094
- Website: cityofbarnesville.com

Barnesville is a city in and the county seat of Lamar County, Georgia, United States, located just outside of the Atlanta metropolitan area. As of the 2020 census, Barnesville had a population of 6,292.

Barnesville is located 37 miles (60 km) northwest of Macon and 60 miles (97 km) south of Atlanta. It was called the "Buggy Capital of the South", as the town produced about 9,000 buggies a year around the turn of the 20th century. Each year in the third week of September the town hosts an annual Buggy Days celebration.

== History ==
Barnesville was founded in 1826 and named for Gideon Barnes, proprietor of a local tavern. Barnesville served as a major hospital site for wounded southern troops during the Civil War. Local families took wounded soldiers into their homes and treated them, with highly successful recovery rates. Major General William B. Bate, CSA of Hardees Corps., wounded in Atlanta at Utoy Creek on August 10, 1864, was treated here. After the war, General Bate was elected governor of Tennessee and served in the United States Senate until his death in 1912. He commented on his successful recovery as a result of the kindness of the local populace in Barnesville.

Educator Helena B. Cobb founded the Helena B. Cobb Institute in Barnesville in the early 1900s. It was modeled after Booker T. Washington's Tuskegee Institute and educated African American girls as the only school within the CME Church for women. In 1920, Barnesville was designated seat of the newly formed Lamar County.

=== Weather events ===
On the morning of April 28, 2011, at 12:38 A.M., a tornado rated EF3 on the Enhanced Fujita Scale with 140 miles per hour (230 km/h) winds touched down in Pike County, 4 miles (6 km) south of Meansville. The tornado went on to destroy several homes in Barnesville. Two deaths occurred in Barnesville along Grove Street. The tornado also destroyed a Chevron gas station and a church in Barnesville. Three tractor trailers were blown off Interstate 75 at approximately 1:02 A.M. This tornado was part of the 2011 Super Outbreak.

== Geography ==
Barnesville is located south of the center of Lamar County at 33°3′11″N 84°9′22″W (33.053090, -84.156217). U.S. Route 41 passes through the western, southern, and eastern outskirts of the city on a bypass; the highway leads northwest 16 miles (26 km) to Griffin and east 13 miles (21 km) to Forsyth. U.S. Route 341 branches off US 41 on the south side of Barnesville and leads southeast 53 miles (85 km) to Perry, where it rejoins US 41. Georgia State Route 18 follows US 41 around the southern and eastern sides of Barnesville but leads west 11 miles (18 km) to Zebulon. State Route 36 follows the western side of the Barnesville bypass and leads northeast 22 miles (35 km) to Jackson and southwest 16 miles (26 km) to Thomaston.

According to the United States Census Bureau, Barnesville has a total area of 6.1 square miles (15.9 km^{2}), of which 6.07 square miles (15.73 km^{2}) are land and 0.05 square miles (0.12 km^{2}), or 0.78%, are water.

Barnesville sits on a low ridge at an elevation of 850 feet (260 m) above sea level. Hog Mountain rises above the city to the north, with a summit elevation of 1,015 feet (309 m). The north side of the city drains via Big Towaliga Creek to the Little Towaliga River, the Towaliga River, and eventually the Ocmulgee River. The east side drains via Tobesofkee Creek to the Ocmulgee south of Macon. The south end of the city drains via Tobler Creek to the Flint River, and the west side drains via Little Potato Creek, then Potato Creek, to the Flint River. Because the Ocmulgee River ultimately drains to the Atlantic Ocean and the Flint River ultimately to the Gulf of Mexico, Barnesville sits on the Eastern Continental Divide.

== Demographics ==
Historical population
Census	Pop.	Note	%±
1870	754		—
1880	1,962		160.2%
1890	1,839		−6.3%
1900	3,036		65.1%
1910	3,068		1.1%
1920	3,059		−0.3%
1930	3,236		5.8%
1940	3,535		9.2%
1950	4,185		18.4%
1960	4,919		17.5%
1970	4,935		0.3%
1980	4,887		−1.0%
1990	4,747		−2.9%
2000	5,972		25.8%
2010	6,755		13.1%
2020	6,292		−6.9%
2025 (est.)	6,329	▲	0.6%
U.S. Decennial Census; 1850-1870 1880; 1890-1910 1920-1930; 1930-1940 1940-1950; 1960-1980 1990; 2025

=== 2020 census ===
As of the 2020 census, Barnesville had a population of 6,292. There were 1,028 families residing in the city. The median age was 32.6 years. 20.1% of residents were under the age of 18 and 16.5% were 65 years of age or older. For every 100 females, there were 78.5 males, and for every 100 females age 18 and over there were 73.5 males age 18 and over.

98.4% of residents lived in urban areas, while 1.6% lived in rural areas.

There were 2,290 households in Barnesville, of which 30.9% had children under the age of 18 living in them. Of all households, 28.9% were married-couple households, 20.0% were households with a male householder and no spouse or partner present, and 44.7% were households with a female householder and no spouse or partner present. About 34.4% of all households were made up of individuals and 15.4% had someone living alone who was 65 years of age or older.

There were 2,555 housing units, of which 10.4% were vacant. The homeowner vacancy rate was 2.1% and the rental vacancy rate was 6.5%.

Barnesville racial composition as of 2020
Race	Num.	Perc.
Black or African American (non-Hispanic)	3,260	51.81%
White (non-Hispanic)	2,584	41.07%
Other/Mixed	230	3.66%
Hispanic or Latino	168	2.67%
Asian	45	0.72%
Native American	3	0.05%
Pacific Islander	2	0.03%

== Education ==
=== Lamar County School District ===
The Lamar County School District holds pre-school to grade twelve, and consists of two elementary schools, a middle school, and a high school. The district has 143 full-time teachers and over 2,600 students.

- Lamar County Elementary School
- Lamar County Primary School
- Lamar County Middle School
- Lamar County Comprehensive High School

=== Private education ===
- St. George's Episcopal School (K-12)
- Rock Springs Christian Academy
- Covenant Heart Academy

=== Higher education ===
- Gordon State College

== Annual events and festivals ==
The Barnesville-Lamar County Chamber of Commerce hosts three annual festivals each year.

- The BBQ & Blues Festival is held the last weekend in April and features an FBA(Florida Barbeque Association) certified cooking competition, food vendors, arts and crafts vendors, and live entertainment throughout the weekend.
- The Summer in the Sticks Country Music Concert is held the 3rd Saturday in July and features live bands, food vendors, and arts and crafts vendors.

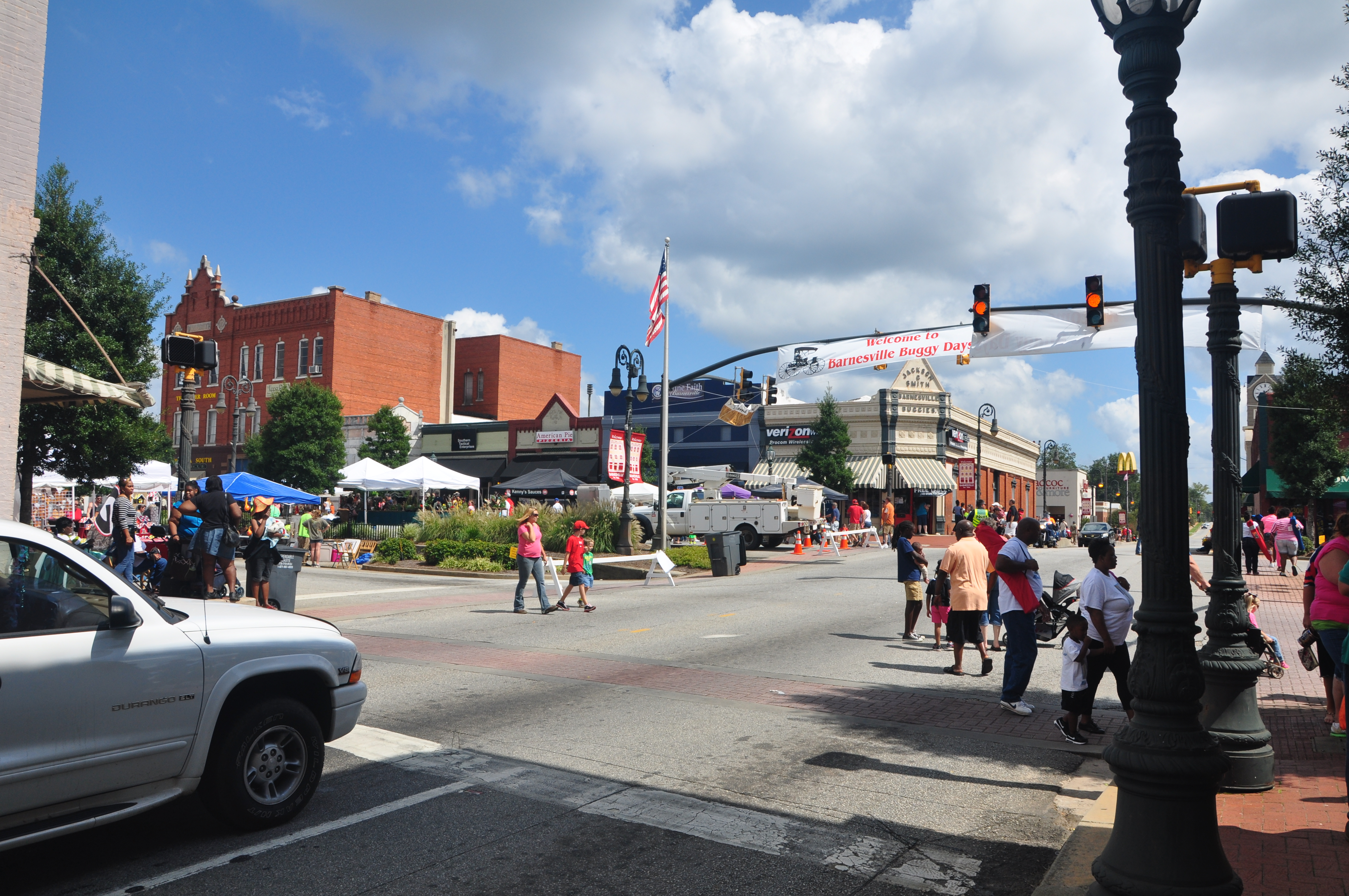
Buggy Days Festival

- The Buggy Days Festival celebrates Barnesville's heritage as the Buggy Capital of the South during the late 1800s. Buggy Days is held on the third full weekend in September.

== Featured in media ==
=== Music ===
Barnesville was the location of an auto accident that killed 16-year-old Jeanette Clark, who was on a date with J.L. Hancock, also 16, on December 22, 1962. This accident was rumored to be the inspiration of the hit song "Last Kiss" written by Wayne Cochran, Joe Carpenter, Randall Hoyal & Bobby McGlon (1961). Hancock was driving a 1954 Chevrolet on the Saturday before Christmas with some friends. In heavy traffic on U.S. Highway 341 their car hit a tractor-trailer carrying a load of logs. Clark, Hancock and Wayne Cooper were killed. Cochran lived on Georgia's Route 19/41 when he wrote "Last Kiss", only 15 miles away from the crash site. He rerecorded "Last Kiss" for release on King Records in 1963 and dedicated it to Clark, a fact which probably explains the association of the song with the tragic crash.

=== Television ===
The 2018 HBO miniseries Sharp Objects, starring Amy Adams, filmed many of its exterior scenes for the fictional town of Wind Gap, Missouri, in Barnesville and the surrounding area. A large mural reading "Welcome to Wind Gap" remains in the town painted by artist Andrew Patrick Henry.

== Notable people ==
- Wayne Cochran, musician
- Franklin Delano Floyd, American murderer
- Victor Henry Hanson, publisher
- Louise Smith, NASCAR driver
- John T. Walker, Bishop of Washington
- Craig Ogletree, NFL Athlete
- CJ Allen, College Football All-American
