= 1996 Summer Paralympics torch relay =

X Paralympic Games
- Host city: Atlanta, Georgia, United States
- Countries visited: United States
- Distance: 1610 km
- Torchbearers: 1001
- Start date: August 5, 1996
- End date: August 15, 1996

The 1996 Summer Paralympics torch relay, also referred to as the NationsBank Paralympic Torch Relay to reflect the event's lead sponsor, was held between August 5 and August 15, leading up to the 1996 Summer Paralympics in Atlanta, Georgia, United States. It was the first Paralympic torch relay held in the United States, beginning at the King Center in Atlanta, then being run from Washington, D.C., back to Atlanta.

Unlike the 1996 Summer Olympics torch relay, which had been conveyed part of the way by motor vehicles and trains.This was a relay carried out exclusively by human power, as the organizers described the Paralympic torch as being moved by "people power only". This included runners on foot and in wheelchairs, cyclists, as well as horseback riders, water-skiers, kayakers, and a rider on a specialized lawn mower.

== Relay ==
Route in Virginia

The relay began in Atlanta on the morning of August 5. The flame was collected from the eternal flame at the tomb of Martin Luther King Jr. at the King Center for Nonviolent Social Change. King's son Dexter Scott King lit a torch from the eternal flame, then passed it to Atlanta Paralympic Committee president Andrew Fleming, who placed it in the lantern that was taken to Washington D.C.

The flame was then flown to Washington, D.C., for a ceremony at the White House on the morning of August 6, where President Bill Clinton spoke before the lighting of the first torch. The flame was then run down the National Mall to the United States Capitol and the Lincoln Memorial before crossing out of the District to Arlington National Cemetery.

Proceeding southward from Washington, the torch passed through Woodbridge, Virginia and ended its first day in Richmond. On August 7, the flame was carried from Richmond to South Boston.

Route in North Carolina

Crossing into North Carolina, the torch stopped for a mid-day celebration in Durham before leaving for Burlington and spending the night of August 8 in Greensboro. The next day, the relay passed through Kernersville on its way to a morning celebration in Winston-Salem, then traveled through Clemmons, Cooleemee, Mooresville, Davidson, Cornelius, and Huntersville before stopping for the evening in Charlotte. Charlotte mayor Pat McCrory was among those who carried the torch in the city.

Route in South Carolina

On August 10, the flame left Charlotte, passing through Belmont, Gastonia, and Kings Mountain before leaving the state at Grover. In South Carolina, the torch was carried through Blacksburg, Gaffney, and Cowpens on its way to a mid-day celebration in Spartanburg.

The torch was originally scheduled to stop in Greenville, South Carolina, on the evening of August 10. However, this plan was canceled after the Greenville County Council passed a resolution condemning homosexuality. The Olympic torch relay had similarly shunned Greenville after the resolution was passed, driving the flame through the county, shielded from view, before entering and after leaving Greenville city limits. The Paralympic torch relay organizers went further, bypassing Greenville entirely by traveling southward from Spartanburg to Switzer, Enoree, and Laurens, before turning west toward Hickory Tavern, Princeton, Honea Path, and Belton, and stopping for the day in Anderson. This made August 10 by far the longest day of the relay in terms of distance traveled, with a total length of 147 miles.

Route in Georgia

On August 11, the flame arrived in Georgia, with the handover ceremony scheduled for the middle of Lake Hartwell. Catherine Fletcher, a paraplegic kayaker, was to pass the torch to fellow kayaker Will Carlton two miles from the shore. However, while she was attempting to hand it over, Fletcher's kayak capsized. Fletcher came up unharmed, but the torch was extinguished and lost at the bottom of the lake. The backup flame was passed to Carlton and the relay continued, passing through the towns of Hartwell, Hull, and Colbert before ending the day in Athens.

The relay route on August 12 traveled through Watkinsville, Madison, Monticello, and Gray on its way to Macon. The next day, IWWF disabled waterski champion Steve Hodges skied with the torch across Lake Tobesofkee. The relay then passed through Yatesville, Thomaston (where quadraplegic local resident Jeff Vinings carried the torch on his custom riding lawnmower), Woodland, and Manchester. It spent the night of Warm Springs, at the newly opened Center for Therapeutic Recreation at the Roosevelt Institute, which was being used as a training facility for Paralympic athletes.

On August 14, the torch left Warm Springs and traveled north through Woodbury, Gay, Alvaton, Haralson, and Senoia, entering the Atlanta suburbs at Fayetteville. Local disabled residents in McDonough protested the decision to have 10 non-disabled runners and only two disabled torchbearers carry the flame through their town. From McDonough, the relay continued to Stone Mountain (stopping at City Hall and not visiting the Confederate monument for which the town is named, despite the fact that the monument park was the venue for some Paralympic events).

The relay's final day took the torch through Clarkston and past the DeKalb County Courthouse in Decatur. Entering the city of Atlanta, mid-day celebrations were held at Phipps Plaza and the Shepherd Spinal Center before the relay finished at Atlanta City Hall. That evening, in the opening ceremony at Centennial Olympic Stadium, the cauldron was lit by paraplegic climber Mark Wellman, who ascended a 120-foot rope with only the use of his arms, the torch attached to his legs, in order to light it.
