= Georgia State Route 18 =

State highway in Georgia

State Route 18
- Georgia State Route 18 highlighted in red

Route information
- Maintained by GDOT
- Length: 147.41 mi (237.23 km)
- Existed: 1919–present

Major junctions
- West end: US 29 / SR 14 in West Point
- I-85 in West Point; I-185 west of Pine Mountain; US 27 / SR 1 in Pine Mountain; US 27 Alt. / SR 41 / SR 109 in Greenville; US 19 / SR 3 in Zebulon; US 41 / US 341 / SR 7 / SR 36 in Barnesville; I-75 / US 41 / SR 19 / SR 42 / SR 83 in Forsyth; US 129 / SR 11 / SR 22 / SR 44 in Gray
- East end: US 80 / SR 19 / SR 96 in Jeffersonville

Location
- Country: United States
- State: Georgia
- Counties: Troup, Harris, Meriwether, Pike, Lamar, Monroe, Jones, Wilkinson, Twiggs

Highway system
- Georgia State Highway System; Interstate; US; State; Special
← SR 17	→ US 19

State Route 18 (SR 18) is a 147.41-mile-long (237.23 km) state highway that travels west-to-east through portions of Troup, Harris, Meriwether, Pike, Lamar, Monroe, Jones, Wilkinson, and Twiggs counties in the western and central parts of the U.S. state of Georgia. The highway connects US 29/SR 14 in West Point, just east of the Alabama state line, with US 80/SR 19/SR 96 in Jeffersonville, via Pine Mountain, Greenville, Zebulon, Barnesville, Forsyth, Gray, and Gordon.

== Route description ==
SR 18 travels east from its western terminus in West Point in Troup County, crosses I-85 just east of West Point, and dips slightly southeasterly into northern Harris County, where is crosses I-185 and continues to Pine Mountain on the county line with Meriwether County. Turning northeast, SR 18 travels to Greenville in central Meriwether County, and is concurrent with US 27/SR 1 from their intersection south of Greenville into downtown Greenville, where SR 18 turns southeast, is concurrent with SR 109, and travels to Woodbury.

Turning east and crossing into Pike County, the route again turns northeast and travels through Molena, where its concurrency with SR 109 ends, into Concord, where it curves east and travels to Zebulon. Curving once again to the southeast, SR 18 crosses into Lamar County and travels to and around Barnesville, where it begins a concurrency with US 41/SR 7, before heading into Forsyth in Monroe County, ending its concurrency with US 41, and where it crosses I-75 shortly after leaving Forsyth. The highway continues east into Jones County and enters Gray, where it is briefly concurrent with US 129, SR 11, and SR 22, and where it turns southeast once more in the direction of Gordon in Wilkinson County.

In Gordon, the highway turns south and southeast, crosses into Twiggs County, and reaches its eastern terminus in Jeffersonville.

== History ==
=== 1920s to 1940s ===
SR 18 was established at least as early as 1919 on its current path, from Greenville to Barnesville. By the end of September 1921, it was extended south-southeast on a concurrency with SR 41 to Harris, then on a sole path southwest to SR 1 in Chipley. Between October 1926 and October 1929, the Chipley–Harris segment had a "completed hard surface". By the middle of 1930, the Harris–Greenville segment also had a completed hard surface. In February 1932, SR 18 was established on a segment from Forsyth to Gray. However, there was no indication if they were connected via a concurrency with US 41/SR 19. In September, a portion east of Greenville had a completed hard surface. In May 1933, the entire Greenville–Woodbury segment was completed. In February 1934, SR 18 was extended westward to West Point. Just over two years later, a portion west of Zebulon was completed. Between September 1938 and July 1939, the path of SR 19 from Barnesville to just southeast of Forsyth was truncated to the latter point. SR 18 was designated on this segment instead. It was also extended southeast from Gray to SR 57 south of Gordon. The segment from Barnesville to southeast of Forsyth, a portion south-southeast of Gray; and the portion south of Gordon all had a completed hard surface. In 1942, two segments had a completed hard surface: a portion west of Chipley and from Woodbury to the approximate location of Molena. Two years later, SR 18 was extended south-southwest to Jeffersonville. Between the beginning of 1945 and November 1946, the entire Woodbury–Zebulon segment was hard surfaced. By February 1948, two segments were also hard surfaced: the West Point–Chipley segment and from Gray to south-southwest of Gordon.

=== 1950s to 2000s ===
Between April 1949 and August 1950, US 27 Alt. was designated on the Harris City–Greensville segment. Two segments were hard surfaced: the Zebulon–Barnesville segment and the western part of the Monroe County portion of the Forsyth–Gray segment. By the beginning of 1952, the entire eastern part of this last segment (except for the eastern end) was hard surfaced. In 1953, the extreme eastern end of this segment was also hard surfaced. Between June 1954 and June 1955, the portion of SR 18 from south of Gordon to Jeffersonville was hard surfaced. By July 1957, a portion west-southwest of Gray was also hard surfaced. Between June 1960 and June 1963, the Junes County portion of the Forsyth–Gray segment was hard surfaced. By the beginning of 1966, the southern part of a south-southwest bypass of Barnesville was proposed from SR 18 in Aldora to an unnumbered road south of Barnesville. In 1967, the bypass was built as part of US 341/SR 7. In 1986, the path of SR 18 was rerouted in Barnesville: it traveled north on US 341/SR 7, then south-southeast on US 41, before resuming its previous path. In 1993, part of a southern bypass of Gray, designated as SR 932, was proposed from US 129/SR 11/SR 18/SR 22 in the southwest part of the city to SR 18 in the southeastern part of it. Five years later, the path of SR 18 in Griffin was shifted southward, replacing the proposed path of SR 932. In 2007, the path of US 41/SR 18 in the Barnesville area was shifted southward, truncating the path of US 341/SR 7 to the current northern terminus.

== Major intersections ==
County	Location	mi	km	Destinations	Notes
Troup	West Point	0.000	0.000	US 29 / SR 14 (10th Street, West Point Road) – Lanett, LaGrange	Western terminus
Troup	West Point	1.440	2.317	I-85 (SR 403) – Montgomery, Atlanta	I-85 exit 2
Troup	West Point	1.931	3.108	SR 103 south	Northern terminus of SR 103
Troup–Harris county line		8.560	13.776	SR 219 (Whitesville Road) – Columbus, LaGrange	
Harris		11.974	19.270	I-185 (SR 411) – Columbus, Atlanta	I-185 exit 34
Harris		18.767	30.203	SR 354 east	Western terminus of SR 354
Harris	Pine Mountain	19.991	32.172	US 27 south / SR 1 south (Main Street) – Hamilton	Western end of US 27/SR 1 concurrency
Harris	Pine Mountain	20.304	32.676	US 27 north / SR 1 north (Martha Berry Highway) – LaGrange	Eastern end of US 27/SR 1 concurrency
Meriwether		27.206	43.784	SR 194 east (Durand Road) – Warm Springs	Western terminus of SR 194
Meriwether		32.323	52.019	US 27 Alt. south / SR 41 south (Roosevelt Highway) – Warm Springs	Traffic circle; western end of US 27 Alt./SR 41 concurrency
Meriwether	Greenville	36.530	58.789	US 27 Alt. north / SR 41 north (Roosevelt Highway) / SR 109 west (Lagrange Highway) – Luthersville	Eastern end of US 27 Alt./SR 41 concurrency; western end of SR 109 concurrency
Meriwether	Greenville	36.954	59.472	SR 109 Spur east (Gay Road) – Gay	Western terminus of SR 109 Spur
Meriwether	Woodbury	44.441	71.521	SR 85 Alt. (Whitehouse Parkway) – Warm Springs, Gay	
Meriwether	Woodbury	45.627	73.430	SR 74 west / SR 85 (Millarden Road) – Gay, Manchester	Western end of SR 74 concurrency
Pike		49.602	79.827	SR 74 east (Crest Highway) – Sunset Village	Eastern end of SR 74 concurrency
Pike	Molena	51.055	82.165	SR 109 east (Spring Road) – Meansville	Eastern end of SR 109 concurrency
Pike	Zebulon	64.298– 64.361	103.478– 103.579	US 19 / SR 3 (Main Street, Griffin Street) – Thomaston, Griffin	One-way pair
Lamar		70.895	114.094	SR 109 west (Meansville Road) – Meansville	Eastern terminus of SR 109
Lamar	Barnesville	75.469	121.456	US 41 north / SR 7 north / SR 36 north – Milner, Jackson	Western end of US 41, SR 7, and SR 36 concurrencies
Lamar	Barnesville	76.120	122.503	SR 36 south (Thomaston Street) – Thomaston	Eastern end of SR 36 concurrency
Lamar		77.465	124.668	US 341 south / SR 7 south – Culloden	Eastern end of SR 7 concurrency; northern terminus of US 341
Monroe	Forsyth	90.506	145.655	SR 83 south (Martin Luther King Jr Drive) – Culloden	Western end of SR 83 concurrency
Monroe	Forsyth	90.965	146.394	SR 42 / SR 83 north (Lee Street) – Roberta, Jackson, Monticello	Eastern end of SR 83 concurrency
Monroe	Forsyth	92.084	148.195	US 41 south / SR 19 south – Macon	Eastern end of US 41 concurrency; northern terminus of SR 19
Monroe	Forsyth	92.805	149.355	I-75 (SR 401) – Macon, Atlanta	I-75 exit 185
Monroe		102.914	165.624	US 23 / SR 87 – Macon, Jackson	
Ocmulgee River		104.199	167.692	The S.A. Hodge Sr. Bridge	
Jones	Gray	115.579	186.006	US 129 north / SR 11 north / SR 22 east (Gray Bypass) – Eatonton, Monticello, Milledgeville	Western end of US 129/SR 11/SR 22 concurrency
Jones	Gray	115.889	186.505	US 129 south / SR 11 south / SR 22 west – Macon	Eastern end of US 129/SR 11/SR 22 concurrency
Jones		124.557	200.455	SR 49 – Macon, Milledgeville	
Wilkinson	Gordon	131.294	211.297	SR 540 – Milledgeville, Macon, Augusta	
Wilkinson	Gordon	132.441	213.143	Milledgeville Road east	Former SR 18 Spur
Wilkinson		134.322	216.170	SR 57 (Main Street) – Irwinton	
Twiggs	Jeffersonville	147.409	237.232	US 80 / SR 19 (Railroad Street) / SR 96 (Magnolia Street) – Macon, Danville, Warner Robins	Eastern terminus
1.000 mi = 1.609 km; 1.000 km = 0.621 mi: Concurrency terminus

== Special route ==
State Route 18 Spur
- Location: Gordon
- Length: 0.6 mi (970 m)
- Existed: 1965–2012

State Route 18 Spur (SR 18 Spur) was a spur route of SR 18 that existed completely within the city limits of Gordon. Between June 1963 and the beginning of 1966, it was established from SR 18 to SR 243. In 2012, this spur route was decommissioned.

The entire route was in Gordon, Wilkinson County.

mi	km	Destinations	Notes
0.0	0.0	SR 18	Southern terminus
0.6	0.97	SR 243	Northern terminus
1.000 mi = 1.609 km; 1.000 km = 0.621 mi
