= Georgia State Route 109 =

Highway in Georgia

State Route 109
- SR 109 highlighted in red, SR 109 Spur in blue

Route information
- Maintained by GDOT
- Length: 62.731 mi (100.956 km)
- Existed: April 7, 1933–present

Major junctions
- West end: CR 278 at the Alabama state line west of Abbottsford
- US 27 / US 29 / SR 1 / SR 14 in LaGrange; I-85 in LaGrange; US 27 Alt. / SR 18 / SR 41 / SR 100 in Greenville; US 19 / SR 3 near Meansville
- East end: SR 18 between Zebulon and Barnesville

Location
- Country: United States
- State: Georgia
- Counties: Troup, Meriwether, Pike, Lamar

Highway system
- Georgia State Highway System; Interstate; US; State; Special
← SR 108	→ SR 110

State Route 109 (SR 109) is a 62.7-mile-long (100.9 km) state highway that runs west-to-east through portions of Troup, Meriwether, Pike, and Lamar counties in the western part of the U.S. state of Georgia. The route travels from the Alabama state line to at SR 18 near Barnesville. Traffic data shows it serves as the primary east-west route of both middle Troup County and Meriwether County. It is considered a medium priority route by the Georgia DOT for its entire length, except between the cities of Lagrange and Greenville, where it is considered a critical priority route. It is also the first east-west state route in west-central Georgia north of the Pine Mountain Range. SR 109 has one Spur route connecting Greenville to Gay. It was first designated on April 7, 1933 much shorter than it is today and shown in August 1933.

== Route description ==
SR 109 is mostly rural except west of I-85. It serves as access to the middle part of West Point Lake and primary east-west access between LaGrange (I-85) and Greenville. With the exception of between US 27/SR 1 and I-85, SR 109 is not part of the National Highway System, a system of roadways important to the nation's economy, defense, and mobility.

=== West Point Lake ===
SR 109 begins as a two lane road at the Alabama state line, where the roadway continues as CR 278, west of Abbottsford. The road heads eastward almost immediately crossing Wehadkee Creek, a tributary of West Point Lake. Then, it passes through Abbottsford, before crossing the main river of West Point Lake (Chattahoochee River). It continues eastward and enters LaGrange and intersects US 29/SR 14. From the Alabama state line until the aforementioned intersection, the road is named Roanoke Road.

This leg of SR 109 serves many public recreation areas of West Point Lake in Georgia both directly and indirectly. SR 109 also provides easy access to the Alabama side of West Point Lake from Georgia; as SR 109 is one of two bridges across the Chattahoochee River of West Point Lake. SR 109 directly serves many of the public accesses and campgrounds for the lake including Pyne Road Park, the Wehadkee Service Area, Indian Springs Group Camp, and the Horace King Access and indirectly serves Highland Marina, McGee Bridge Recreation Area, Holiday Park, Whitetail Ridge Campground, Dewberry Recreation Area (Alabama), Evansville Recreation Area (Alabama), and the former Stateline Park (Georgia and Alabama)

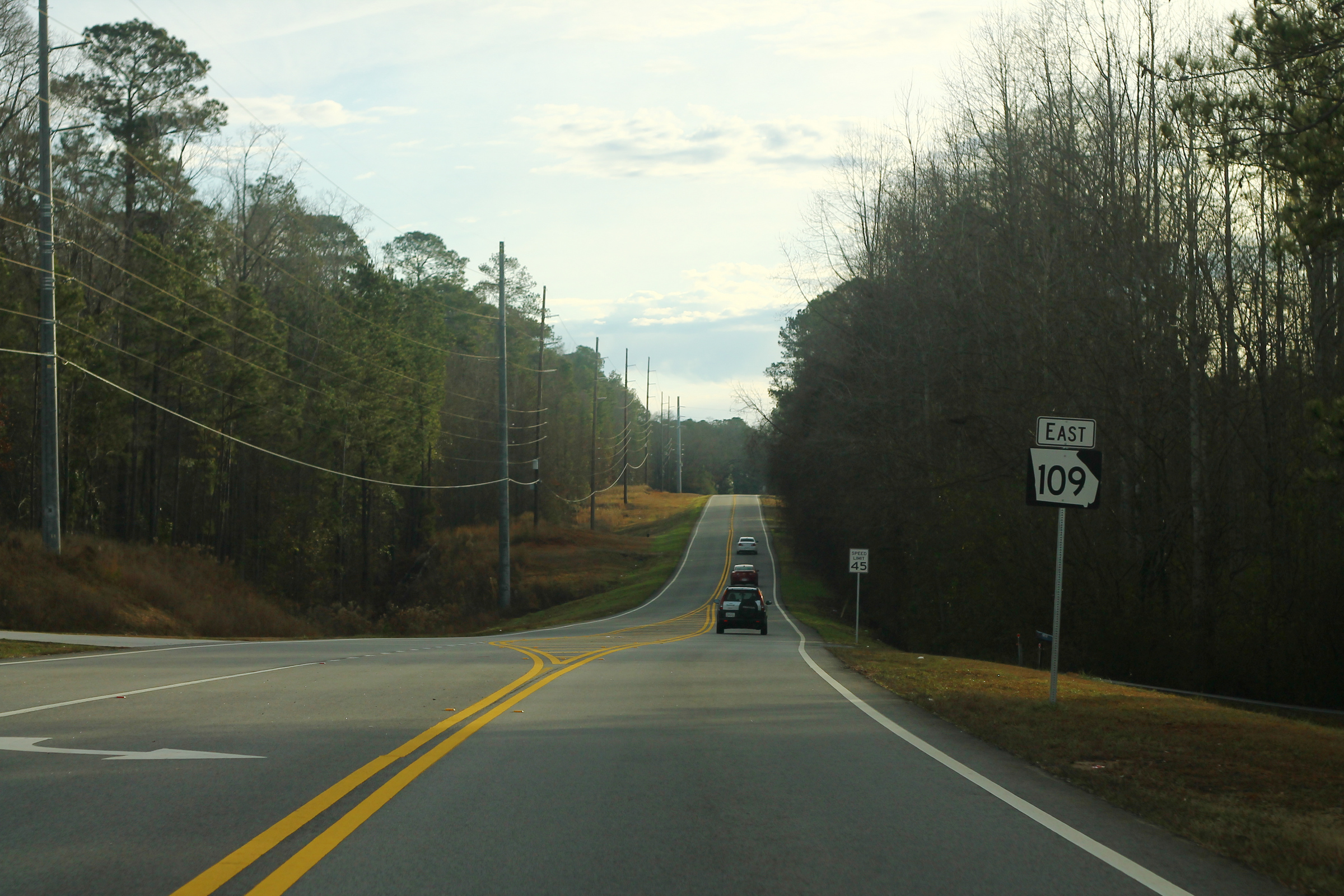
A small section just west of LaGrange near the bypass (Pegasus Parkway)

=== LaGrange to I-185 ===
At the intersection of US 29/SR 14, it now turns eastward, beginning a concurrency with US 29/SR 14 as Vernon Street as a four-lane divided highway. Before entering downtown LaGrange SR 109 services Wellstar West Georgia Medical Center then slims into a two lane road just after the hospital. State Route 109 serves as the primary east-west route through downtown LaGrange. Continuing eastward toward downtown, the route then passes the Hills and Dales Estate and LaGrange College before arriving at Lafayette Square and the Lafayette Fountain. Just past LaFayette Square, the three routes meet US 27/SR 1/SR 219 (Morgan Street). At this intersection US 29/SR 14 depart to the north, along US 27/SR 1/SR 219 north. The road now takes the name Lafayette Parkway and becomes considered a critical priority route. On the east end of town, it services LaGrange Mall and other commercial businesses before it has an interchange with Interstate 85 (I-85 Exit 18). East of the I-85 interchange, it helps service an industrial park that includes a Walmart distribution center. Narrowing down to a two lane road, it then crosses over, but does not interchange with I-185.

=== I-185 to SR 18 ===
The route becomes a rural two lane road after the I-185 bridge with the exception of passing through small unincorporated towns. In Greenville, the highway loses its critical priority status as it meets US 27 Alternate/SR 18/SR 41, as well as SR 100 (North Depot Street). Here, US 27 Alternate/SR 18/SR 41/SR 109 run concurrent around the city square. SR 18 runs concurrent with SR 109 to the east. Just before leaving town named as the Woodbury Highway, they intersect SR 109 Spur (Gay Road). In Woodbury, is an intersection with SR 85 Alternate (Whitehouse Parkway). Then, they meet SR 74/SR 85. At this intersection, SR 74 joins the concurrency. Just before entering Molena, SR 74 splits off as Crest Highway. In town, SR 18 splits off to the north-northeast, while SR 109 heads east. The road heads northeast to a concurrency with US 19/SR 3, just west-southwest of Meansville. SR 109 heads through town and meets its eastern terminus, an intersection with SR 18, located between Zebulon and Barnesville.

=== Traffic ===
The Georgia Department of Transportation average annual daily traffic (AADT) numbers for the year 2018 shows the daily average vehicle load in the thousands for most of its route, except in the city of Lagrange where it sees numbers in the ten-thousands. From its western terminus, the average load starts at 4,290 vehicles and increases to 7,860 near its turn onto US 29/SR 14. Upon joining US 29/SR 14, its value jumps to 17,100 and remains near these values until after it crosses US 27/SR 1 in downtown LaGrange. The volume was so high that a bypass (Pegasus Parkway) was proposed and eventually built. Within a short distance, the daily average vehicle load increases to 21,400 and with one exception, increases steadily to 24,300 at the interchange with I-85 marking this stretch the busiest for the entire route. Eastward of I-85, the values rapidly decrease from 16,300 to 8,360 at the I-185 bridge. As SR 109 continues eastward in Troup County, the values steadily decrease through 5,930 to 3,820 as it crosses into Meriwether County. Until the route reaches SR 74/SR 85, the vehicle load stays between 3,500 and 4,500. After crossing SR 85 and joining SR 74, the vehicle load jumps to 6,470 before lowering back to an average of 5,240 as it crosses into Pike County. After turning northward toward Molena, the load drops to 2,630 before separating away from SR 18. Leaving Molena, the value is the lowest for the entire route at 1,120 and remains at that level until it nears US 19/SR 3 and jumps to 2,790. Eastward of US 19/SR 3, the values drop back into the low one-thousands for the remainder of the route.

== History ==
=== 1933–1970 ===
The first portion of the roadway that is signed as SR 109 today was designated on April 7, 1933 and makes its first appearance in August 1933. It was unimproved but maintained and measuring 19.2 miles (30.9 km) and went between US 29/SR 14 in LaGrange to SR 41 in Greenville. In October 1933, a small portion near Greenville underwent some type of construction. In January 1935, SR 109 underwent construction from Greenville to the Meriwether–Troup county line. Finally in October 1935, the entire length between Greenville and LaGrange was under construction. In April 1937, an unimproved but maintained section measuring 17.1 miles (27.5 km) travelled in an arc between the Alabama state line and US 29/SR 14 just west of LaGrange. Finally in January 1938, the Meriwether County section of 109 was graded but not surfaced. with the entire Greenville–LaGrange section being graded by September 1938. A small section between US 29 and the Chattahoochee River was under some type of construction also at that time. By 1938, the future Pike County sections of SR 109 were built as was the Greenville-Gay section by, 1939 but none of these sections would be designated until later. The Greenville–LaGrange section was the last upgrade in the 1930s being finally hard surfaced in January 1940.

On September 25, 1940, a third section of SR 109 measured 9.2 miles (14.8 km) was listed as unimproved but maintained was designated where modern day SR 109 Spur runs, between Greenville and Gay and became hard surfaced by April 1941. In 1944, a fourth section 10 miles (16 km) long was designated between Molena and SR 3 in Pike County and by 1945 a small section of it was hard surfaced. Also in 1945, a portion of the second section of SR 109, between US 29/SR 14 and the Alabama state line, was hard surfaced from US 29/SR 14 to just past the Chattahoochee River near the future intersection of SR 244. North of this point to the Alabama state line was only a type of stabilized earth. In April 1949, the Greenville–LaGrange section of SR 109 was designated a principal state route.

Between January 1952 and September 1953, the section between SR 244 and the Alabama state line was graded but not hard surfaced along with the western half of the section between Molena and US 19/SR 3 while the eastern half of this section was hard surfaced. Also in 1952, SR 109 was shown designated throughout its entire Pike County routing; from SR 18 east of Molena to SR 18 near Barnesville. The eastern leg designation wouldn't show on state maps until 1960. The western half of this section was hard surfaced by June 1954. Between June 1955 and July 1957, more of SR 109 was hard surfaced from SR 244 to just north of the Heard–Troup county line. Also, the stretch between Greenville and LaGrange was no longer designated a principal state highway. By June 1960, SR 109 was hard surfaced and designated on state maps for its entire length from the Alabama state line to its current terminus with SR 18 near Barnesville. No recorded changes were made until 1971.

=== 1970–1997 ===
In 1971, SR 109 begins to closely resemble the modern routing of the route. With the West Point Dam under construction, the 1971 route of SR 109 would soon be underwater which followed modern day Antioch Road and Old Roanoke Road. Thus the short-lived SR 701 and SR 701 Spur was marked under construction as a path over the future lake. In 1975, SR 701, its spur, and West Point Dam were completed as well as the SR 109/I-85 interchange was under construction to be completed in full by 1978.

By 1976, the SR 109/I-85 interchange (as I-85 exit 4) was completed and SR 109 rerouted to follow SR 701 and SR 701 Spur respectively. By 1977, SR 109 now officially had two spur routes, one in Meriwether county from Greenville to Gay and one in Troup County from the Alabama state line to Abbottsford. Also in 1977, east of LaGrange began construction of modern day Lafayette Parkway (SR 109). Before and during the construction of this parkway, SR 109 turned north on Broad Street near LaGrange College and travelled through downtown LaGrange parallel with US 29/SR 14 until crossing US 27/SR 1. Continuing eastward, it followed Greenville Street until it met modern day Lafayette Parkway near State Route 14 Spur. East of I-85, the route follows its modern day routing to its eastern terminus. West of LaGrange, SR 109 follows its modern day path from US 29/SR 14 to Abbottsford but in 1980, turns north on modern day Rock Mills Road at its junction with then SR 109 Spur. Spur 109 follows the modern day routing of SR 109 from the Alabama state line to Abbottsford.

By 1985, Lafayette Parkway as a two-lane road was opened and SR 109 relocated to it from Greenville Street. In 1986, SR 109 was a four-lane road for a short distance on either side of the I-85 interchange. In 1987, SR 109 became four lanes from just east of US 27/SR 1 to just east of the I-85 interchange. Also in 1987, the Troup county route of Spur 109 is abolished and the mainline takes its path west from Abbottsford to the Alabama state line. Sometime between 1993 and 1996, US 29/SR 14/SR 109 was rerouted from Vernon Road to the recently built Vernon Street. This is a four-lane divided highway from the Vernon Road junction to just after the split off of US 29/SR 14 which also upgraded added a second road entrance to the hospital. 1996 marks the first year with its modern day routing.

== Major intersections ==
County	Location	mi	km	Destinations	Notes
Troup		0.0	0.0	CR 278 west – Roanoke	Western terminus at the Alabama state line
Troup		3.8	6.1	West Point Lake / Chattahoochee River	
Troup	LaGrange	9.5	15.3	US 29 south / SR 14 south	Western end of US 29/SR 14 concurrency
Troup	LaGrange	11.8	19.0	US 27 / SR 1 / SR 219 (Morgan Street) / US 29 north / SR 14 north (Morgan Street) – Pine Mountain, Franklin, Hogansville	Eastern end of US 29/SR 14 concurrency
Troup		15.3	24.6	I-85 (SR 403) – Montgomery, Atlanta	I-85 exit 18
Meriwether	Greenville	31.2	50.2	US 27 Alt. north / SR 18 east / SR 41 north	Western end of US 27 Alt./SR 18/SR 41 concurrency around the city square
Meriwether	Greenville	31.2	50.2	US 27 Alt. south / SR 41 south / SR 100 north (North Depot Street)	Western end of US 27 Alt./SR 41 concurrency around the city square; southern terminus of SR 100
Meriwether	Greenville	31.2	50.2	US 27 Alt. south / SR 41 south (Roosevelt Highway)	Eastern end of US 27 Alt./SR 41 concurrency around the city square
Meriwether	Greenville	31.2	50.2	US 27 Alt. north / SR 41 north (North Talbotton Street)	Eastern end of US 27 Alt./SR 41 concurrency around the city square
Meriwether	Greenville	31.7	51.0	SR 109 Spur east (Gay Road) – Gay	Western terminus of SR 109 Spur
Meriwether	Woodbury	39.1	62.9	SR 85 Alt. (Whitehouse Parkway) – Gay, Manchester	
Meriwether	Woodbury	40.3	64.9	SR 74 north / SR 85	Western end of SR 74 concurrency
Flint River		43.1	69.4	Meriwether–Pike county line	
Pike		44.3	71.3	SR 74 south – Thomaston	Eastern end of SR 74 concurrency
Pike	Molena	45.7	73.5	SR 18 east (North Main Street) – Concord	Eastern end of SR 18 concurrency
Pike		55.7	89.6	US 19 south / SR 3 south	Western end of US 19/SR 3 concurrency
Pike		56.2	90.4	US 19 north / SR 3 north	Eastern end of US 19/SR 3 concurrency
Lamar		62.7	100.9	SR 18 – Zebulon, Barnesville	Eastern terminus
1.000 mi = 1.609 km; 1.000 km = 0.621 mi: Concurrency terminus

== Special routes ==
=== Troup County spur route ===
State Route 109 Spur
- Location: Rural Troup County
- Length: 2.2 mi (3.5 km)
- Existed: 1975–1986

State Route 109 Spur (SR 109 Spur) was a spur route that existed entirely within the west-central part of Troup County. Sometime in 1986, SR 109 Spur was merged into the SR 109 mainline thus abolishing the route.

It began at the Alabama state line, where the roadway continued as CR 278. The road crossed over a tributary of the recently filled West Point Lake (Wehadkee Creek). It then passed the Harmony Cemetery, before it met its eastern terminus, an intersection with the SR 109 mainline, in Abbottsford. It was originally SR 701 Spur before West Point Lake was filled and while plans to reroute the mainline across the future lake were underway.

=== Meriwether County spur route ===
State Route 109 Spur
- Location: Greenville to Gay
- Length: 9.05 mi (14.56 km)
- Existed: March 31, 1976–present
- History: Built before January 1939 but not officially designated as a spur until March 31, 1976.

State Route 109 Spur (SR 109) is a spur route that connects SR 18/SR 109 (Woodbury Road) in Greenville to SR 74/SR 85 (Oakland Road) in Gay. It is located in the central and east-central parts of Meriwether County. The roadway itself existed as far back as 1939; however, wasn't designated as a state route until 1941 as mainline SR 109. Finally on March 31, 1976, the mainline was relocated further south with SR 18 and Gay Road changed to SR 109 Spur.

A portion of this route is considered part of the Meriwether-Pike Scenic Byway since 2011. The route is known as Gay Road for its entire length.

The entire route is in Meriwether County.

Location	mi	km	Destinations	Notes
Greenville	0.0	0.0	SR 18 / SR 109 (Woodbury Road)	Western terminus
Gay	9.05	14.56	SR 74 / SR 85 (Oakland Road)	Eastern terminus
1.000 mi = 1.609 km; 1.000 km = 0.621 mi
