= Georgia State Route 362 =

State highway in Georgia

State Route 362
- SR 362 highlighted in red

Route information
- Maintained by GDOT
- Length: 32.5 mi (52.3 km)
- Existed: 1966–present

Major junctions
- West end: US 27 Alt. / SR 41 north of Greenville
- SR 74 / SR 85 south-southwest of Haralson; US 19 / US 41 / SR 3 in Griffin
- East end: US 19 Bus. / US 41 Bus. / SR 155 in Griffin

Location
- Country: United States
- State: Georgia
- Counties: Meriwether, Pike, Spalding

Highway system
- Georgia State Highway System; Interstate; US; State; Special
← SR 361	→ SR 363

State Route 362 (SR 362) is a 32.5-mile-long (52.3 km) state highway located in the west-central part of the U.S. state of Georgia. It is mainly a rural highway, traveling through parts of Meriwether, Pike, and Spalding counties, connecting the Greenville area with Griffin, via Williamson.

The roadway had an eastern segment built by the end of 1953. This segment was effectively extended to the west the following year. In 1960, the western segment was built. Before the decade was over, it had been designated as SR 362, the Alvaton–Hollondale segment was built, and the SR 362 designated was extended along the rest of the roadway.

== Route description ==
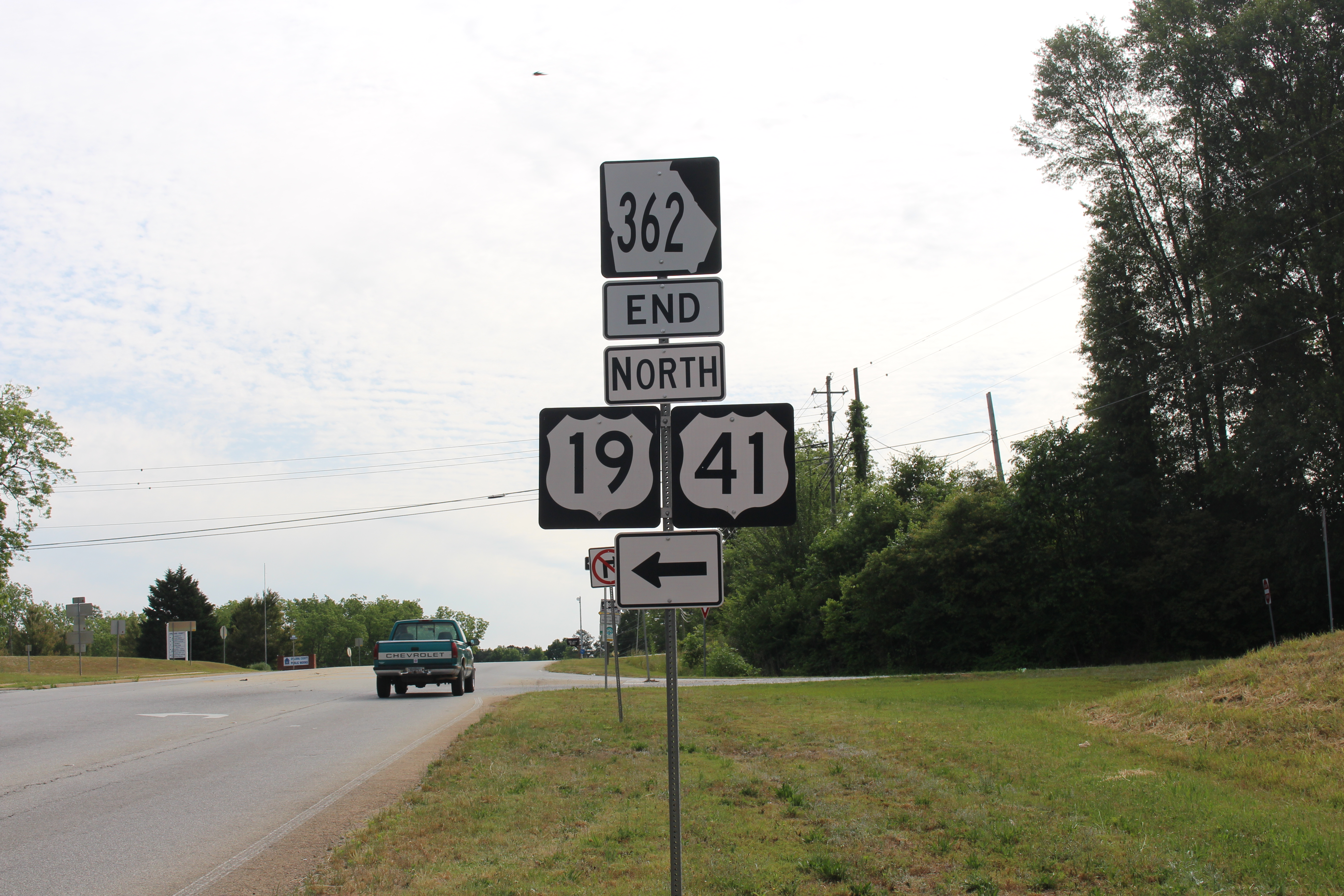
Eastern terminus

SR 362 begins at an intersection with US 27 Alternate/SR 41 north of Greenville, in Meriwether County, and travels to the northeast, through unincorporated and generally rural areas of the county. The highway has a concurrency with SR 74/SR 85 for about 1 mile (1.6 km) south-southwest of Haralson. SR 362 then travels to the east, crossing the Flint River into Pike County. It then curves back to the northeast, crossing into Spalding County before reaching an interchange with US 19/US 41/SR 3 (Martin Luther King Jr. Parkway) in Griffin. The route continues to the northeast, passing northwest of Municipal Park. Then, it turns right onto West Poplar Street and meets its eastern terminus, an intersection with US 19 Business/US 41 Business/SR 155 (South Hill Street) in downtown.

The only part of SR 362 that is included as part of the National Highway System, a system of roadways important to the nation's economy, defense, and mobility, is the section east of US 19/US 41/SR 3 in Griffin.

== History ==
The road that would eventually become SR 362 was established by the end of 1953. It was the east-northeast segment of a roadway that started in Zebulon, traveled to the north-northwest into Williamson, and curved to the east-northeast and entered Griffin. By the middle of 1954, another section from the current Kings Bridge Road intersection (in Hollonville) east to Williamson, was added.

By the middle of 1960, the section from the current western terminus to the western intersection with SR 85 (SR 74 hadn't been designated along the highway at that time), just south of Alvaton, was built. By 1966, this segment was designated as SR 362.

In 1967, the portion of roadway from Alvaton to Hollonville was built, thus completing the current length. The next year, the entire road was designated as SR 362.

By the beginning of 1975, SR 74 was designated along the stretch of SR 85 with which SR 362 runs concurrent.

== Major intersections ==
County	Location	mi	km	Destinations	Notes
Meriwether		0.0	0.0	US 27 Alt. / SR 41 (Roosevelt Highway) – Greenville, Newnan	Western terminus
Meriwether		11.1	17.9	SR 74 south / SR 85 south (Oakland Road)	Western end of SR 74/SR 85 concurrency
Meriwether	Alvaton	12.1	19.5	SR 74 north / SR 85 north (Millarden Road)	Eastern end of SR 74/SR 85 concurrency
Flint River		16.4	26.4	Unnamed bridge over the Flint River	
Pike	No major junctions				
Spalding	Griffin	30.3	48.8	US 19 / US 41 / SR 3 (Martin Luther King Jr. Parkway) – Zebulon, Barnesville, Hampton	
Spalding	Griffin	32.5	52.3	US 19 Bus. / US 41 Bus. / SR 155 (South Hill Street)	Eastern terminus; roadway continues as East Poplar Street.
1.000 mi = 1.609 km; 1.000 km = 0.621 mi: Concurrency terminus
