= West Central Georgia =

Coordinates: 33°10′N 84°50′W

- Region
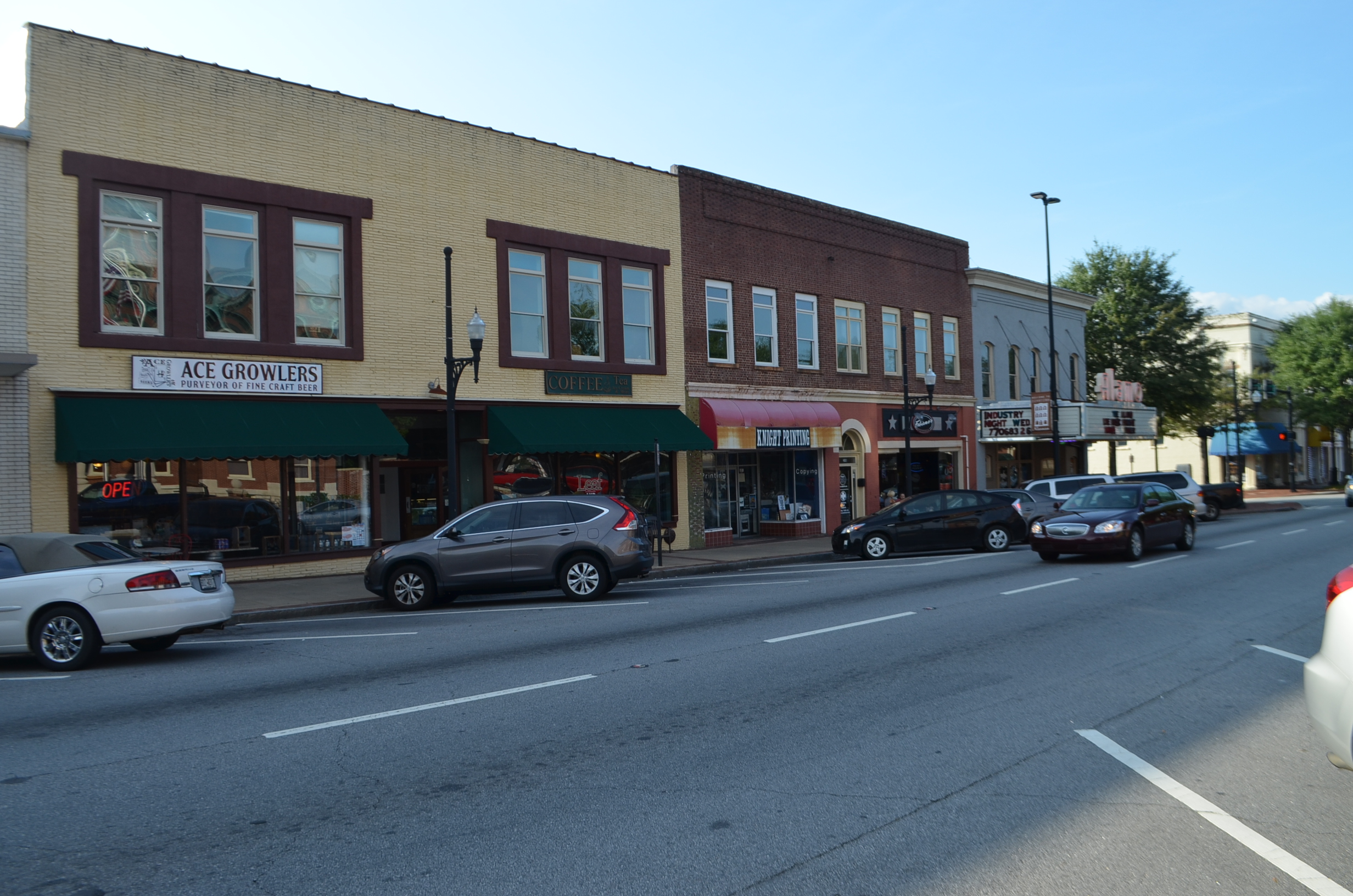
- Newnan West Court Square

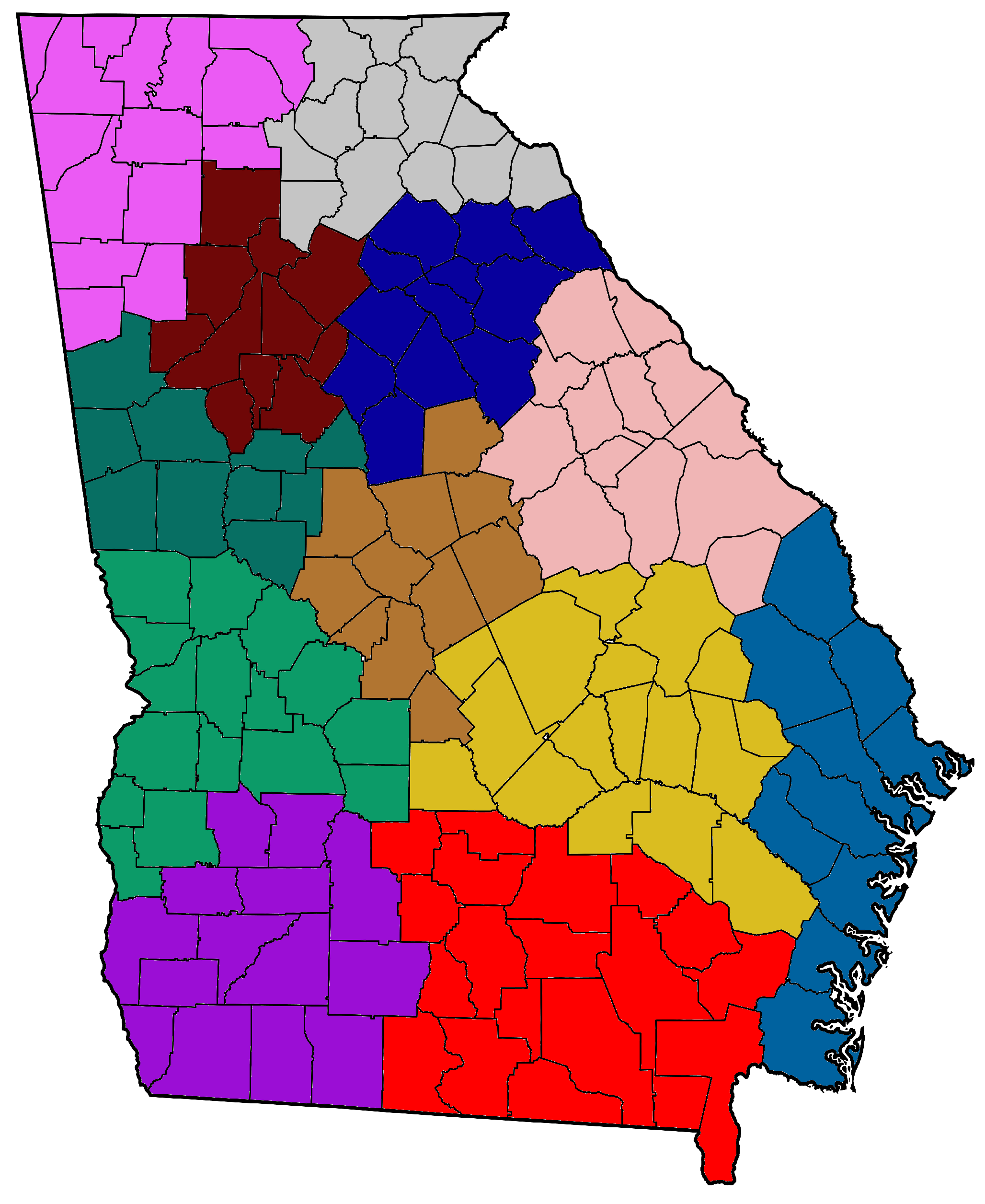
- West Central Georgia highlighted in dark green

- Location of Georgia within the United States
- Country: United States
- State: Georgia

Population (2020)
  - Total: 524,586
- Demonym: West Central Georgian
- Website: www.georgia.org/regions/west-central-north-georgia

West Central Georgia is a ten-county region in the U.S. state of Georgia, bordering Alabama. As of 2020, the region's population was 524,586.

== Geography ==
According to the Georgia Department of Economic Development, West Central Georgia consists of the following counties: Butts, Carroll, Coweta, Heard, Lamar, Meriwether, Pike, Spalding, Troup, and Upson. The region is included within the Atlanta–Athens–Clarke–Sandy Springs combined statistical area.

== Demographics ==
As of the 2020 United States census, the counties forming the region had a total resident population of 524,586. In common with the remainder of the state, West Central Georgia's racial and ethnic makeup in each county was predominantly non-Hispanic white and African American.

According to the 2020 Association of Religion Data Archives study, Christianity was the region's largest religion, and the majority of the population were Protestants affiliated with the Baptist, non-denominational, Methodist and Pentecostal traditions. The single largest Christian denominations were the Southern Baptist Convention, United Methodist Church, Catholic Church, Assemblies of God USA, and the Church of God (Cleveland, Tennessee).

The second-largest religion in West Central Georgia as of 2020 was Islam, followed by Buddhism, the Baha'i Faith, and Hinduism.

== Economy ==
In a study by the Georgia Department of Economic Development, the most prominent industries were education and manufacturing.

== Transportation ==
- Interstate 85
- U.S. Route 27 Alternate
- U.S. Route 29
- State Route 14
- State Route 16
- State Route 34
- State Route 34 Bypass
- State Route 41
- State Route 54
- State Route 70
- State Route 74
- State Route 85
- State Route 154
- State Route 403
