= Park Mound =

Archaeological site in Georgia, USA

Park Mound Site
- Cultures: South Appalachian Mississippian culture
- Location: Troup County, Georgia, USA
- Region: Troup County, Georgia

Site notes
- Architectural style: platform mound
- Excavation dates: 1969-1973

The Park Mound Site (9TP41) is a destroyed archaeological site located near Yellow Jacket Creek in Troup County, Georgia, USA. It was investigated by Harold Huscher and a team of University of Georgia students in the early 1970s.

== Background ==
In the early 1970s, Troup Country, Georgia was in the midst of archaeological investigations by a contract with the University of Georgia and the National Park Service. Between 1970 and 1972, the contract archaeologists were searching for historically documented Muscogee villages located within the West Point Lake reservoir project area; at this time, all fieldwork was limited to the Park Mound Site.

In 1969, Huscher and his students began archaeological investigations of the Park Mound site, where initial clearing of vegetation was the primary goal to prepare for future excavations. It was not until later, in 1973, when the mound was investigated further with funds from a grant supported by the Callaway Foundation of LaGrange, Georgia.

Park Mound is located on a large triangular portion of the flood plain at the junction of Yellow Jacket Creek and the Chattahoochee River. The site consisted of a single substructure platform mound measuring 170 feet (52 m) northwest to southeast and 120 feet (37 m) northeast to southwest and is 13 feet (4.0 m) high with surrounding village midden deposits. The villages were only occupied on the northern and northeastern sides of the mound. All the pottery recovered during the excavations in 1972 was identifiable as Bull Creek complex. A small number of Archaic lithic artifacts were also discovered, dating to late Etowah or Savannah phase time period, signifying brief occupation. David J. Hally and Leila Oertal at the University of Georgia compiled post excavations, archeological reports. The Park Mound site was destroyed at the completion of the West Point Lake reservoir in 1975.

Yellow Jacket Creek is currently a recreational park area in southwestern central Georgia near the West Point Lake reservoir.
