= Haralson, Georgia =

- Town
- Location in Coweta County and the state of Georgia
- Coordinates: 33°13′35″N 84°34′17″W
- Country: United States
- State: Georgia
- Counties: Coweta, Meriwether

Area
  - Total: 0.79 sq mi (2.04 km^{2})
  - Land: 0.78 sq mi (2.01 km^{2})
  - Water: 0.012 sq mi (0.03 km^{2})
- Elevation: 837 ft (255 m)

Population (2020)
  - Total: 172
  - Density: 221.1/sq mi (85.38/km^{2})
- Time zone: UTC-5 (Eastern (EST))
  - Summer (DST): UTC-4 (EDT)
- ZIP code: 30229
- Area code: 770
- FIPS code: 13-36528
- GNIS feature ID: 356164
- Website: https://www.cityofharalson.org/

Haralson is a town in Coweta and Meriwether counties in the U.S. state of Georgia. The population was 172 at the 2020 census. It is noted for being one of the filming locations for both The Walking Dead and Lawless.

== History ==
The first permanent settlement at Haralson was made in the 1820s. Haralson was named for Hugh A. Haralson, a former Georgia congressman, who is also the namesake of Haralson County, Georgia.

The Georgia General Assembly incorporated the place as the Town of Haralson in 1907.

== Geography ==
Haralson is located primarily in southeastern Coweta County, though the town's limits extend slightly south into Meriwether County. Georgia State Routes 74 and 85 run concurrently through the town, leading north 6 miles (10 km) to Senoia and south 10 miles (16 km) to Gay.

According to the United States Census Bureau, Haralson has a total area of 0.8 square miles (2.1 km^{2}), of which 0.01 square miles (0.0 km^{2}), or 1.39%, are water.

== Demographics ==
Historical population
Census	Pop.	Note	%±
1890	114		—
1910	174		—
1920	176		1.1%
1930	133		−24.4%
1940	108		−18.8%
1950	142		31.5%
1960	141		−0.7%
1970	162		14.9%
1980	123		−24.1%
1990	139		13.0%
2000	144		3.6%
2010	166		15.3%
2020	172		3.6%
2025 (est.)	196	▲	14.0%
U.S. Decennial Census

In 2000, there were 144 people, 57 households, and 200 families residing in the town. By 2020, its population was 172.
