= Pike County School District =

School district in Georgia (U.S. state)

Address
- 16 Jackson Street Zebulon, Georgia, 30295-6734; United States
- Coordinates: 33°06′11″N 84°20′34″W

District information
- Grades: Pre-school - 12
- Superintendent: Michael Duncan, Ed. D.
- Accreditations: Southern Association of Colleges and Schools; Georgia Accrediting Commission

Students and staff
- Enrollment: 2,805
- Faculty: 156

Other information
- Website: www.pike.k12.ga.us

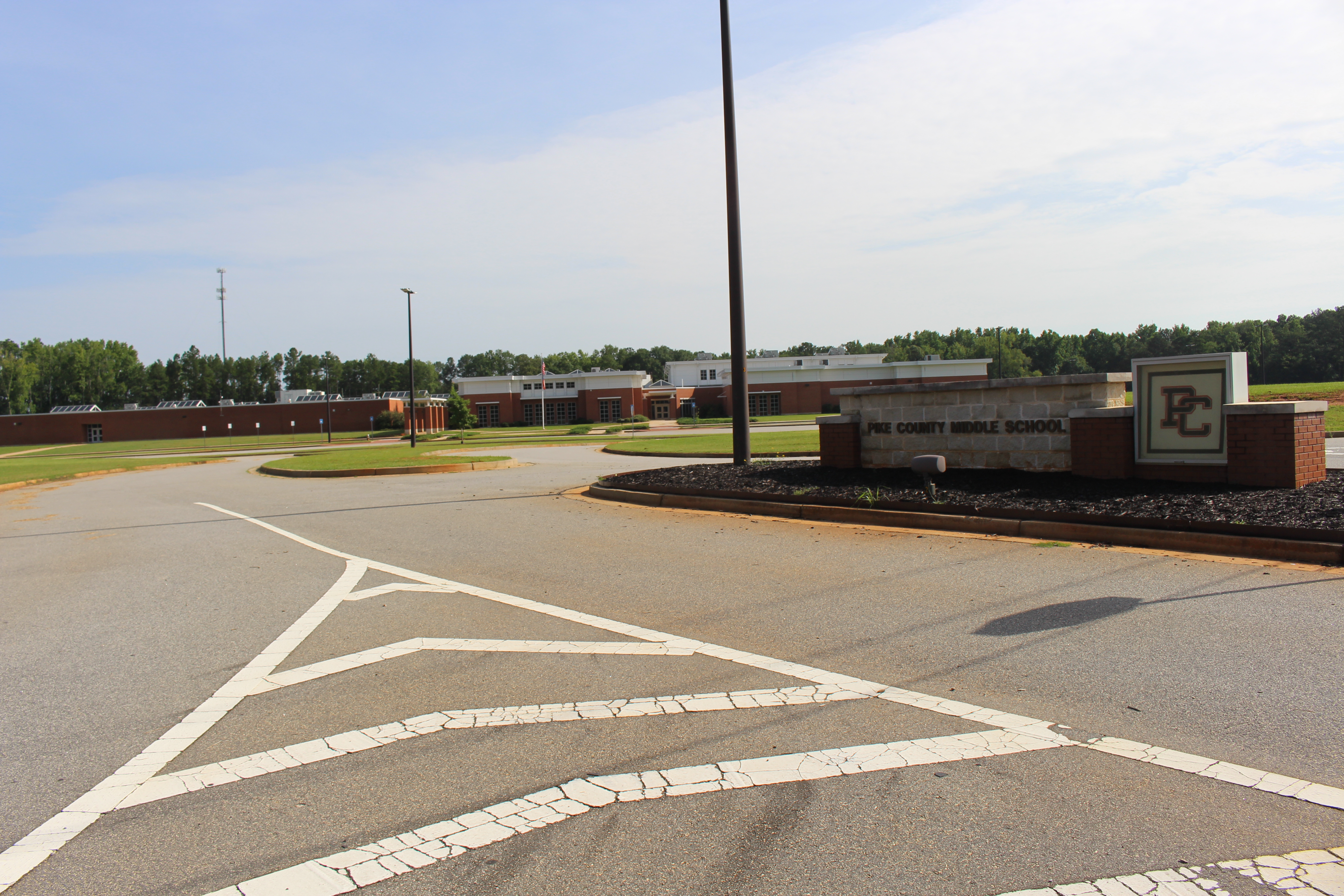
Pike County Middle School

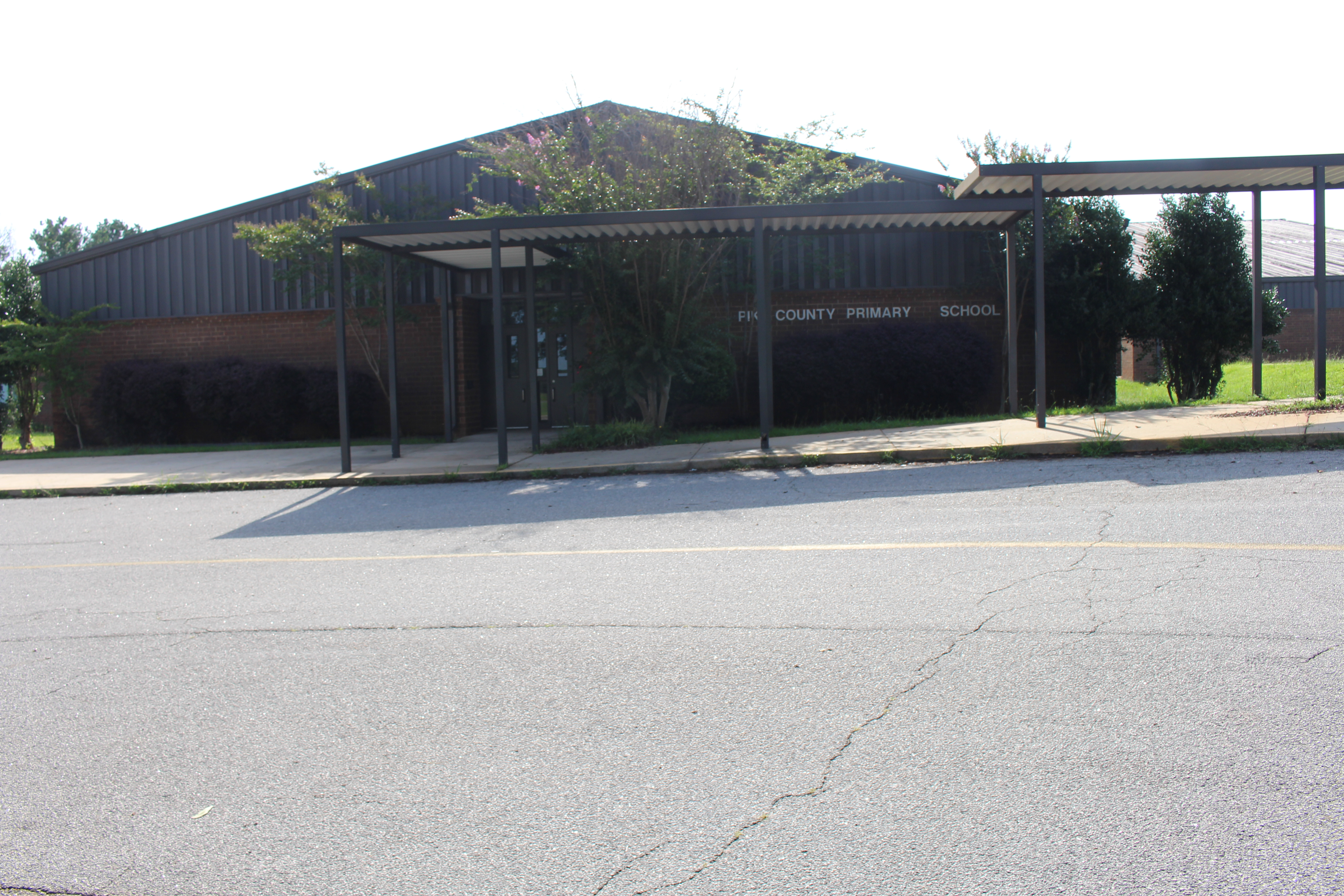
Pike County Primary School

The Pike County School District is a public school district in Pike County, Georgia, United States, based in Zebulon. It serves the communities of Concord, Hilltop, Meansville, Molena, Williamson, and Zebulon. Michael Duncan is the superintendent of schools.

== Schools ==
The Pike County School District has a Pre-K building, two elementary schools, one middle school, a ninth grade academy and two high schools. Zebulon High School ranks in the bottom 1% of Georgia schools according to the Georgia Governor's Office of Student Achievement.

=== Elementary schools ===
- Pike County Primary School
- Pike County Elementary School

=== Middle school ===
- Pike County Middle School

=== High school ===
- Pike County 9th Grade Academy
- Pike County High School
- Zebulon High School
