= Starr's Mill, Georgia =

- Unincorporated community
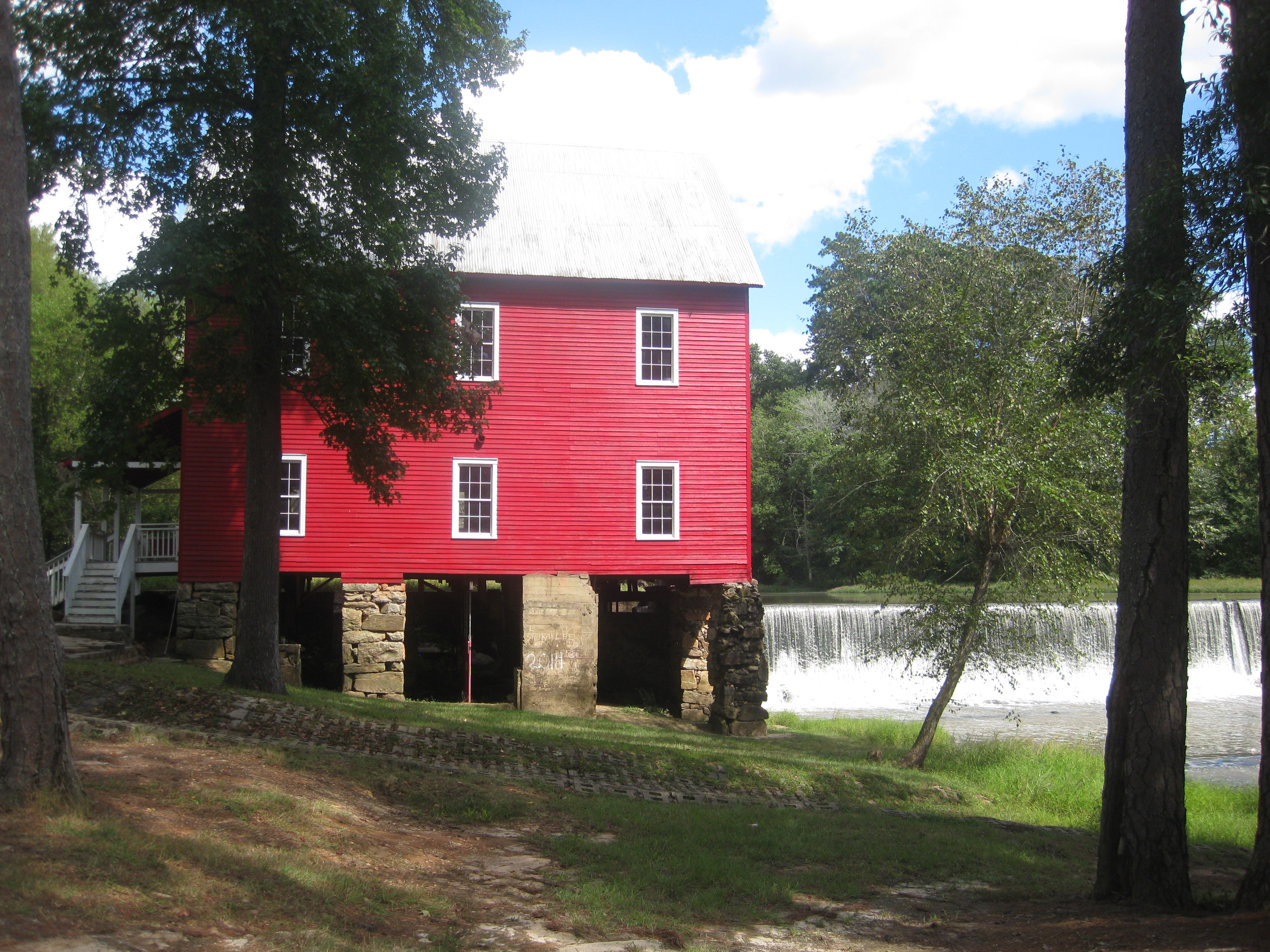
- The current mill, built in 1907

- Starr's Mill location in Georgia (U.S. State)
- Coordinates: 33°20′00″N 84°32′00″W
- Country: United States
- State: Georgia
- County: Fayette
- Elevation: 787 ft (240 m)
- Time zone: UTC−5 (EST)
  - Summer (DST): UTC−4 (EDT)
- ZIP code: 30215
- Area codes: 678, 770
- GNIS feature ID: 333117
- Other names: Glen Grove; Nyson

Starr's Mill is an unincorporated community in Fayette County, Georgia, United States. It is centered at Georgia State Route 85 and Georgia State Route 74. It formed around a grist mill of the same name. A historic marker in the community reads:

"The property that became Starr's Mill was owned by Hananiah Gilcoat who built the first mill here before his death in 1825. This site, on Whitewater Creek, was less than a mile from the boundary between Creek Indian lands and the State of Georgia. Hilliard Starr, who owned the mill from 1866 until 1879, gave the site its current name. After the first two log structures burned, William T. Glower built the current building in 1907. This mill operated until 1959, using a water-powered turbine, instead of a wheel, to grind corn and operate a sawmill. The Starr's Mill site also included a cotton gin and a dynamo that produced electricity for nearby Senoia."
