= Georgia State Route 74 =

Highway in Georgia

State Route 74
- Georgia State Route 74 highlighted in red

Route information
- Maintained by GDOT
- Length: 107.89 mi (173.63 km)

Major junctions
- South end: I-75 / SR 540 in Macon
- US 41 / SR 247 in Macon; I-475 in Macon; US 341 / SR 7 near Culloden; US 19 / SR 3 / SR 36 in Thomaston; I-85 in Fairburn
- North end: US 29 / SR 14 in Fairburn

Location
- Country: United States
- State: Georgia
- Counties: Bibb, Monroe, Upson, Pike, Meriwether, Coweta, Fayette, Fulton

Highway system
- Georgia State Highway System; Interstate; US; State; Special
← SR 73W	→ I-75

State Route 74 (SR 74) is a 107.89-mile-long (173.63 km) state highway that runs southeast-to-northwest through portions of Bibb, Monroe, Upson, Pike, Meriwether, Coweta, Fayette, and Fulton counties in the central part of the U.S. state of Georgia. The route connects the Macon and Fairburn, via Thomaston, Woodbury, and Peachtree City.

== Route description ==
SR 74 begins at an interchange with Interstate 75 (I-75) and SR 540 in the Unionville neighborhood of Macon, in Bibb County. This interchange is at the southwestern edge of Mercer University. Just over 1,000 feet (300 m) later, it intersects US 41/SR 247 (Pio Nono Avenue). It curves to the southwest, passing Macon Mall. It heads west-northwest, passing Macon Memorial Park Cemetery, before an interchange with I-475. It passes just north of Lake Tobesofkee and the Tobesofkee Recreation Area, before crossing into Monroe County. The highway gradually zigzags its way to an intersection with SR 42. It continues to the west and intersects US 341/SR 7 (Peach Blossom Trail), just north-northeast of Culloden. Then, it heads northwest into Upson County. It curves into Yatesville. It heads west-northwest and curves to the southwest, to enter Thomaston. In town, the highway begins a concurrency with SR 36 (Barnesville Highway). They intersect US 19/SR 3. At the next block, SR 36/SR 74 turn to the left onto South Green Street, while SR 74 Alternate (West Main Street) begins straight ahead. One more block later, SR 74 splits off to the west onto West Gordon Street. It curves to the northwest and meets the western terminus of SR 74 Alternate just before leaving town. It continues to the northwest, then curves to the southwest, before heading northwest again. The highway continues to the northwest, through rural areas of the county and crosses the southwestern corner of Pike County. South-southwest of Molena, SR 18/SR 109 begin a concurrency to the west. The three highways head west-southwest and Flint River into Meriwether County. They enter Woodbury. There, at the intersection with SR 85, SR 74 splits off to the north, running concurrent with SR 85. A short distance later, they meet the northern terminus of SR 85 Alternate (Whitehouse Parkway). Farther to the north-northwest, in Gay, is the eastern terminus of SR 109 Spur (Greenville Street). In the unincorporated community of Alps, they intersect SR 362, which briefly joins the concurrency. Less than 3 miles (4.8 km) later, they reach the Meriwether–Coweta county line. The concurrent highways pass through Haralson and enter the southeast part of Senoia. There, they intersect with SR 16 (Wells Street). Less than 2 miles (3.2 km) later, they cross over Line Creek, into Fayette County. They enter Starrs Mill, where SR 74 departs to the northwest. Almost immediately, it enters Peachtree City. The highway passes by the Atlanta Regional Airport. Farther to the north-northwest, it intersects SR 54. SR 74 passes through Tyrone and enters Fulton County. Just under 1.5 miles (2.4 km) later, it meets an interchange with I-85 in Fairburn. The highway curves to the northwest and runs underneath a bridge that carries US 29/SR 14 (Roosevelt Highway). At the ramp that leads to US 29/SR 14, SR 74 takes the ramp and ends at Roosevelt Highway.

The only portion of SR 74 that is part of the National Highway System, a system of routes determined to be the most important for the nation's economy, mobility, and defense, is from SR 54 in Peachtree City to its northern terminus.

== Major intersections ==
County	Location	mi	km	Destinations	Notes
Bibb	Macon	0.000	0.000	I-75 north (SR 401 north) / SR 540 east (Fall Line Freeway east) to I-16 / Mercer University Drive east – Atlanta	Southern terminus; I-75 exit 163 northbound; roadway continues as Mercer University Drive
Bibb	Macon	0.089	0.143	Thelma T-Lady Ross Bridge; crossing over I-75 (SR 401) / SR 540 (Fall Line Freeway)	
Bibb	Macon	0.173	0.278	I-75 south (SR 401 south) / SR 540 west (Fall Line Freeway west) – Valdosta	I-75 exit 163 southbound
Bibb	Macon	0.416	0.669	US 41 / SR 247 (Pio Nono Avenue) – Warner Robins, Forsyth	
Bibb		4.816	7.751	I-475 (SR 408) – Valdosta, Atlanta	I-475 exit 5
Monroe		21.904	35.251	SR 42 – Musella, Forsyth	
Monroe		28.102	45.226	US 341 / SR 7 – Culloden, Barnesville	Roundabout
Upson	Thomaston	43.819	70.520	SR 36 east (Barnesville Highway) – Barnesville	Southern end of SR 36 concurrency
Upson	Thomaston	43.973	70.768	US 19 north / SR 3 north (Center Street)	Northbound lanes of US 19/SR 3, on One-way pairs
Upson	Thomaston	44.030	70.859	US 19 south / SR 3 south (Church Street)	Southbound lanes of US 19/SR 3, on one-way pairs
Upson	Thomaston	44.084	70.946	SR 74 Alt. west (West Main Street)	Eastern terminus of SR 74 Alt.
Upson	Thomaston	44.137	71.032	SR 36 west (South Green Street) – Woodland	Northern end of SR 36 concurrency
Upson	Thomaston	45.660	73.483	SR 74 Alt. east (West Main Street)	Western terminus of SR 74 Alt.
Pike		58.659	94.403	SR 18 east / SR 109 east	Southern end of SR 18/SR 109 concurrency
Meriwether	Woodbury	62.633	100.798	SR 18 west / SR 109 west (Woodbury Highway) / SR 85 south	Northern end of SR 18/SR 109 concurrency; southern end of SR 85 concurrency
Meriwether	Woodbury	63.314	101.894	SR 85 Alt. south (Whitehouse Parkway) – Warm Springs	Northern terminus of SR 85 Alt.
Meriwether	Gay	70.399	113.296	SR 109 Spur south (Greenville Street) – Greenville	Northern terminus of SR 109 Spur
Meriwether		75.348	121.261	SR 362 west (Callaway Road) – Greenville	Southern end of SR 362 concurrency
Meriwether	Alvaton	76.301	122.795	SR 362 east (Griffin Highway) – Griffin	Northern end of SR 362 concurrency
Coweta	Senoia	85.310	137.293	SR 16 (Wells Street) – Sharpsburg, Griffin	
Fayette	Starrs Mill	88.323	142.142	SR 85 north – Fayetteville	Northern end of SR 85 concurrency
Fayette	Peachtree City	95.456	153.622	SR 54 (Floy Farr Parkway) – Atlanta, Newnan, Fayetteville	
Fayette	Tyrone	101.855	163.920	Senoia Road south – Tyrone Downtown Business District	Northbound entrance; southbound exit; interchange
Fulton	Fairburn	106.391	171.220	I-85 (SR 403) – Montgomery, Atlanta	I-85 exit 61
Fulton	Fairburn	107.889	173.631	US 29 / SR 14 (Roosevelt Highway) / East Broad Street / Virlyn B. Smith Road north – Fairburn, Palmetto, Downtown Fairburn, CSX Intermodal, Bohannon Industrial Park	Northern terminus; interchange; roadway continues as Virlyn B. Smith Road
1.000 mi = 1.609 km; 1.000 km = 0.621 mi: Concurrency terminus; Incomplete access

== Bannered route ==
State Route 74 Alternate
- Location: Thomaston
- Length: 1.5 mi (2.4 km)

State Route 74 Alternate (SR 74 Alt.) is a 1.5-mile-long (2.4 km) alternate route that exists entirely within the central part of Upson County. Its route is completely within the city limits of Thomaston.

It begins at an intersection with the SR 74 mainline (West Gordon Street) in the far western part of Thomaston. It heads east-southeast and gradually curves to the southeast. It then curves back to the east. It meets its eastern terminus, an intersection with Green Street, one block north of SR 36/SR 74, in the main part of town. Here, the roadway continues as West Main Street.

The entire route is in Thomaston, Upson County.

mi	km	Destinations	Notes
0.0	0.0	SR 74 (West Gordon Street) – Thomaston, Woodbury	Western terminus
1.5	2.4	Green Street / West Main Street to SR 36 / SR 74	Eastern terminus; roadway continues as West Main Street.
1.000 mi = 1.609 km; 1.000 km = 0.621 mi
