= Switzer, South Carolina =

Human settlement in Spartanburg County, South Carolina, United States

Coordinates: 34°48′18″N 82°01′41″W

Switzer is an unincorporated community in Spartanburg County, in the U.S. state of South Carolina.

== History ==
A post office called Switzer was established in 1886, and remained in operation until 1952. The community was named for the Switzer family, the original owners of the town site.
