= Culloden, Georgia =

- City
- Location in Monroe County and the state of Georgia
- Coordinates: 32°51′47″N 84°5′37″W
- Country: United States
- State: Georgia
- County: Monroe

Area
  - Total: 0.80 sq mi (2.06 km^{2})
  - Land: 0.78 sq mi (2.01 km^{2})
  - Water: 0.015 sq mi (0.04 km^{2})
- Elevation: 725 ft (221 m)

Population (2020)
  - Total: 200
  - Density: 257.3/sq mi (99.36/km^{2})
- Time zone: UTC-5 (Eastern (EST))
  - Summer (DST): UTC-4 (EDT)
- ZIP code: 31016
- Area code: 478
- FIPS code: 13-20848
- GNIS feature ID: 0355402

Culloden is a city in Monroe County, Georgia, United States. The population was 200 in the 2020 census. It is part of the Macon metropolitan statistical area.

== History ==
The first settlement at Culloden was made ca. 1739. The community was named after William Culloden, a local merchant. Its post office has been in operation since 1825. The Georgia General Assembly incorporated the place in 1887 as the "City of Culloden", with municipal corporate limits extending in a one-mile radius from the central town well.

== Geography ==
Culloden is located in the southwestern part of Monroe County at 32°51′47″N 84°5′37″W (32.863155, -84.093621).

The city is located along U.S. Route 341 and Georgia State Route 74. U.S. 341 runs from north to south just east of the city, leading north 15 miles (24 km) to Barnesville and south 12 miles (19 km) to Roberta. GA-74 runs from west to east to the north of the city, leading east 32 miles (51 km) to Macon and west 17 miles (27 km) to Thomaston.

According to the United States Census Bureau, Culloden has a total area of 0.8 square miles (2.1 km^{2}), of which 0.02 square miles (0.05 km^{2}), or 2.14%, are water. The city sits on the Eastern Continental Divide, separating waters that flow southwest to the Gulf of Mexico from those that flow southeast to the Atlantic Ocean. Water on the west side of the city flows into tributaries of Auchumpkee Creek, which leads southwest to the Flint River, part of the Apalachicola River watershed, while water to the east flows to tributaries of Echeconnee Creek, which runs southeast to the Ocmulgee River, part of the Altamaha River watershed.

== Demographics ==
Historical population
Census	Pop.	Note	%±
1880	381		—
1900	334		—
1910	365		9.3%
1920	361		−1.1%
1930	337		−6.6%
1940	251		−25.5%
1950	261		4.0%
1960	260		−0.4%
1970	272		4.6%
1980	281		3.3%
1990	242		−13.9%
2000	223		−7.9%
2010	175		−21.5%
2020	200		14.3%
U.S. Decennial Census

=== Racial and ethnic composition ===
Culloden city, Georgia – Racial and ethnic composition Note: the US Census treats Hispanic/Latino as an ethnic category. This table excludes Latinos from the racial categories and assigns them to a separate category. Hispanics/Latinos may be of any race.
Race / Ethnicity (NH = Non-Hispanic)	Pop 2000	Pop 2010	Pop 2020	% 2000	% 2010	% 2020
White alone (NH)	64	73	97	28.70%	41.71%	48.50%
Black or African American alone (NH)	158	101	91	70.85%	57.71%	45.50%
Native American or Alaska Native alone (NH)	0	0	0	0.00%	0.00%	0.00%
Asian alone (NH)	0	0	0	0.00%	0.00%	0.00%
Native Hawaiian or Pacific Islander alone (NH)	0	0	0	0.00%	0.00%	0.00%
Other race alone (NH)	0	0	0	0.00%	0.00%	0.00%
Mixed race or Multiracial (NH)	0	0	10	0.00%	0.00%	5.00%
Hispanic or Latino (any race)	1	1	2	0.45%	0.57%	1.00%
Total	223	175	200	100.00%	100.00%	100.00%

== Notable person ==
- Alfred Blalock, surgeon who developed the Blalock–Taussig shunt to relieve the cyanosis of Tetralogy of Fallot, leading to the modern era of cardiac surgery.
