= Meriwether County, Georgia =

County in Georgia, United States

- County
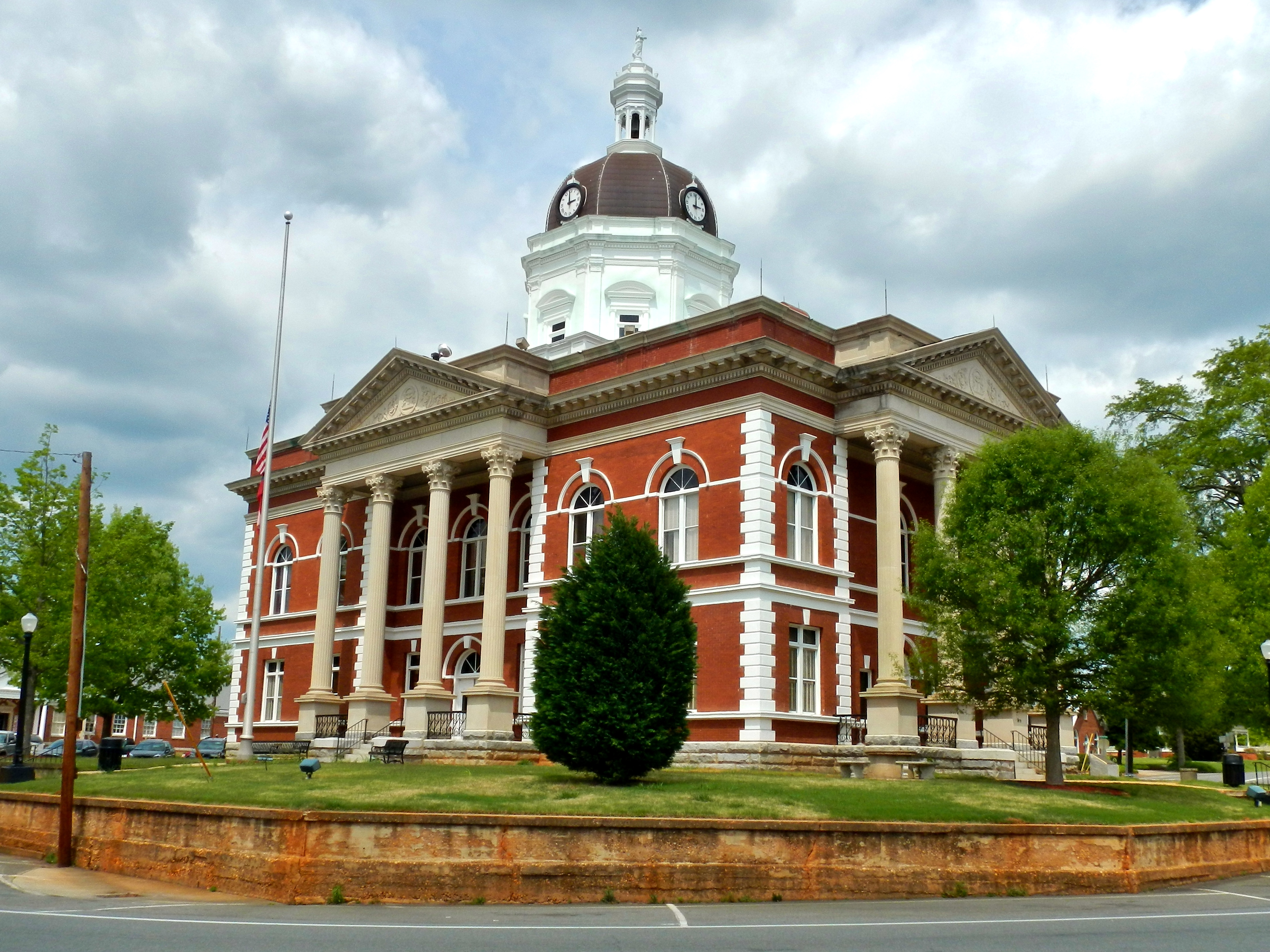
- Meriwether County Courthouse in Greenville

- Seal Logo

- Location within the U.S. state of Georgia
- Coordinates: 33°02′N 84°41′W
- Country: United States
- State: Georgia
- Founded: 1827; 199 years ago
- Named for: David Meriwether
- Seat: Greenville
- Largest city: Manchester

Area
  - Total: 505 sq mi (1,310 km^{2})
  - Land: 501 sq mi (1,300 km^{2})
  - Water: 4.2 sq mi (11 km^{2}) 0.8%

Population (2020)
  - Total: 20,613
  - Estimate (2025): 21,516 ▲
  - Density: 41.1/sq mi (15.9/km^{2})
- Time zone: UTC−5 (Eastern)
  - Summer (DST): UTC−4 (EDT)
- Congressional district: 3rd
- Website: meriwethercountyga.gov

Meriwether County is a county in the West Central region of the U.S. state of Georgia. As of the 2020 census, the population was 20,613. The county seat is Greenville, home of the Meriwether County Courthouse. The county was formed on December 14, 1827, as the 73rd county in Georgia. It was named for David Meriwether, a general in the American Revolutionary War and member of Congress from Georgia.

Meriwether County is part of the Atlanta-Sandy Springs-Roswell MSA.

== Geography ==
According to the U.S. Census Bureau, the county has a total area of 505 square miles (1,310 km^{2}), of which 501 square miles (1,300 km^{2}) is land and 4.2 square miles (11 km^{2}) (0.8%) is water.

The county is located in the Piedmont region of the state. Portions of the Pine Mountain Range are found in the southern parts of the county near the cities of Warm Springs and Manchester.

The eastern two-thirds of Meriwether County, going east from just west of U.S. Route 27 Alternate, is located in the Upper Flint River sub-basin of the ACF River Basin (Apalachicola-Chattahoochee-Flint River Basin). The western third of the county is located in the Middle Chattahoochee River-Lake Harding sub-basin of the same ACF River Basin.

=== Major highways ===
- Interstate 85 / State Route 403 (unsigned)
- U.S. Route 27 Alternate
- State Route 18
- State Route 41
- State Route 54
  - State Route 54 Spur
- State Route 74
- State Route 85
  - State Route 85 Alternate
  - State Route 85 Spur
- State Route 100
- State Route 109
  - State Route 109 Spur
- State Route 173
- State Route 190
- State Route 194
- State Route 362

=== Adjacent counties ===
- Coweta County (north)
- Spalding County (northeast)
- Pike County (east)
- Upson County (southeast)
- Talbot County (south)
- Harris County (southwest)
- Troup County (west)

== Communities ==
=== Cities ===
- Greenville (county seat)
- Luthersville
- Manchester
- Warm Springs
- Woodbury

=== Towns ===
- Gay
- Lone Oak
- Pine Mountain (mostly in Harris County)

=== Unincorporated community ===
- Alvaton

== Demographics ==
Historical population
Census	Pop.	Note	%±
1830	4,422		—
1840	14,132		219.6%
1850	16,476		16.6%
1860	15,330		−7.0%
1870	13,756		−10.3%
1880	17,651		28.3%
1890	20,740		17.5%
1900	23,339		12.5%
1910	25,180		7.9%
1920	26,167		3.9%
1930	22,437		−14.3%
1940	22,055		−1.7%
1950	21,055		−4.5%
1960	19,756		−6.2%
1970	19,461		−1.5%
1980	21,229		9.1%
1990	22,411		5.6%
2000	22,534		0.5%
2010	21,992		−2.4%
2020	20,613		−6.3%
2025 (est.)	21,516	▲	4.4%
U.S. Decennial Census; 1790-1880 1890-1910; 1920-1930 1930-1940; 1940-1950 1960-1980; 1980-2000 2010 2020

=== Racial and ethnic composition ===
Meriwether County, Georgia – Racial and ethnic composition Note: the US Census treats Hispanic/Latino as an ethnic category. This table excludes Latinos from the racial categories and assigns them to a separate category. Hispanics/Latinos may be of any race.
Race / Ethnicity (NH = Non-Hispanic)	Pop 1980	Pop 1990	Pop 2000	Pop 2010	Pop 2020	% 1980	% 1990	% 2000	% 2010	% 2020
White alone (NH)	11,529	12,308	12,579	12,606	12,084	54.31%	54.92%	55.82%	57.32%	58.62%
Black or African American alone (NH)	9,413	9,940	9,467	8,583	7,273	44.34%	44.35%	42.01%	39.03%	35.28%
Native American or Alaska Native alone (NH)	22	25	71	67	64	0.10%	0.11%	0.32%	0.30%	0.31%
Asian alone (NH)	14	11	52	141	78	0.07%	0.05%	0.23%	0.64%	0.38%
Native Hawaiian or Pacific Islander alone (NH)	x	x	11	2	6	x	x	0.05%	0.01%	0.03%
Other race alone (NH)	12	6	15	18	50	0.06%	0.03%	0.07%	0.08%	0.24%
Mixed race or Multiracial (NH)	x	x	148	228	583	x	x	0.66%	1.04%	2.83%
Hispanic or Latino (any race)	239	121	191	347	475	1.13%	0.54%	0.85%	1.58%	2.30%
Total	21,229	22,411	22,534	21,992	20,613	100.00%	100.00%	100.00%	100.00%	100.00%

=== 2020 census ===
As of the 2020 census, the county had a population of 20,613. The median age was 46.2 years. 19.8% of residents were under the age of 18 and 21.7% of residents were 65 years of age or older. For every 100 females there were 91.9 males, and for every 100 females age 18 and over there were 89.8 males age 18 and over. 0.0% of residents lived in urban areas, while 100.0% lived in rural areas.

The racial makeup of the county was 59.3% White, 35.3% Black or African American, 0.3% American Indian and Alaska Native, 0.4% Asian, 0.0% Native Hawaiian and Pacific Islander, 1.0% from some other race, and 3.6% from two or more races. Hispanic or Latino residents of any race comprised 2.3% of the population.

There were 8,396 households in the county, of which 26.3% had children under the age of 18 living with them and 31.4% had a female householder with no spouse or partner present. About 28.2% of all households were made up of individuals and 13.6% had someone living alone who was 65 years of age or older.

There were 9,456 housing units, of which 11.2% were vacant. Among occupied housing units, 72.5% were owner-occupied and 27.5% were renter-occupied. The homeowner vacancy rate was 1.5% and the rental vacancy rate was 7.3%.

== Politics ==
Meriwether County is a moderately Republican county, voting 63% for Donald Trump in 2024. The last Democrat to win the county in a presidential election was Al Gore in 2000. For elections to the United States House of Representatives, Meriwether County is part of Georgia's 3rd congressional district, currently represented by Brian Jack. For elections to the Georgia State Senate, Meriwether County is part of District 29, currently represented by Randy Robertson. For elections to the Georgia House of Representatives, Meriwether County is part of districts 136 and 137.

United States presidential election results for Meriwether County, Georgia
Year	Republican		Democratic		Third party(ies)	
Year	No.	%	No.	%	No.	%
1912	26	2.66%	862	88.05%	91	9.30%
1916	36	2.88%	1,118	89.44%	96	7.68%
1920	186	14.94%	1,059	85.06%	0	0.00%
1924	103	7.74%	886	66.57%	342	25.69%
1928	287	15.93%	1,515	84.07%	0	0.00%
1932	53	1.99%	2,604	97.82%	5	0.19%
1936	138	5.36%	2,438	94.61%	1	0.04%
1940	174	5.98%	2,726	93.74%	8	0.28%
1944	189	7.95%	2,187	92.05%	0	0.00%
1948	204	8.47%	1,967	81.65%	238	9.88%
1952	531	13.01%	3,551	86.99%	0	0.00%
1956	592	15.88%	3,137	84.12%	0	0.00%
1960	706	18.55%	3,100	81.45%	0	0.00%
1964	2,250	48.14%	2,423	51.84%	1	0.02%
1968	1,120	20.55%	1,760	32.29%	2,571	47.17%
1972	3,420	73.82%	1,213	26.18%	0	0.00%
1976	1,450	23.09%	4,830	76.91%	0	0.00%
1980	1,838	31.66%	3,876	66.77%	91	1.57%
1984	3,195	52.73%	2,864	47.27%	0	0.00%
1988	3,101	51.31%	2,934	48.54%	9	0.15%
1992	2,364	32.30%	4,002	54.67%	954	13.03%
1996	2,259	36.13%	3,492	55.85%	502	8.03%
2000	3,162	47.13%	3,441	51.29%	106	1.58%
2004	4,402	53.98%	3,709	45.48%	44	0.54%
2008	4,982	52.34%	4,465	46.91%	71	0.75%
2012	4,856	52.36%	4,331	46.70%	87	0.94%
2016	5,222	56.47%	3,804	41.13%	222	2.40%
2020	6,524	59.96%	4,287	39.40%	69	0.63%
2024	7,375	62.56%	4,373	37.10%	40	0.34%

United States Senate election results for Meriwether County, Georgia2
Year	Republican		Democratic		Third party(ies)	
Year	No.	%	No.	%	No.	%
2020	6,432	59.68%	4,135	38.37%	211	1.96%
2020	5,833	59.25%	4,012	40.75%	0	0.00%

United States Senate election results for Meriwether County, Georgia3
Year	Republican		Democratic		Third party(ies)	
Year	No.	%	No.	%	No.	%
2020	3,255	30.40%	3,018	28.19%	4,434	41.41%
2020	5,808	59.00%	4,036	41.00%	0	0.00%
2022	5,336	60.13%	3,363	37.90%	175	1.97%
2022	5,020	60.74%	3,245	39.26%	0	0.00%

Georgia Gubernatorial election results for Meriwether County
Year	Republican		Democratic		Third party(ies)	
Year	No.	%	No.	%	No.	%
2022	5,704	64.03%	3,160	35.47%	44	0.49%

== Education ==
The Meriwether County School District has six schools:

- Mountain View Elementary School
- Unity Elementary School
- Greenville Middle School
- Manchester Middle School
- Greenville High School
- Manchester High School

== Media ==
The county is served by the Meriwether Vindicator newspaper.

== See also ==
- National Register of Historic Places listings in Meriwether County, Georgia
- List of counties in Georgia
