= West Point Lake =

Lake in Georgia, U.S.

- West Point Dam and Lake; Lake West Point; West Point (without the lake designator)
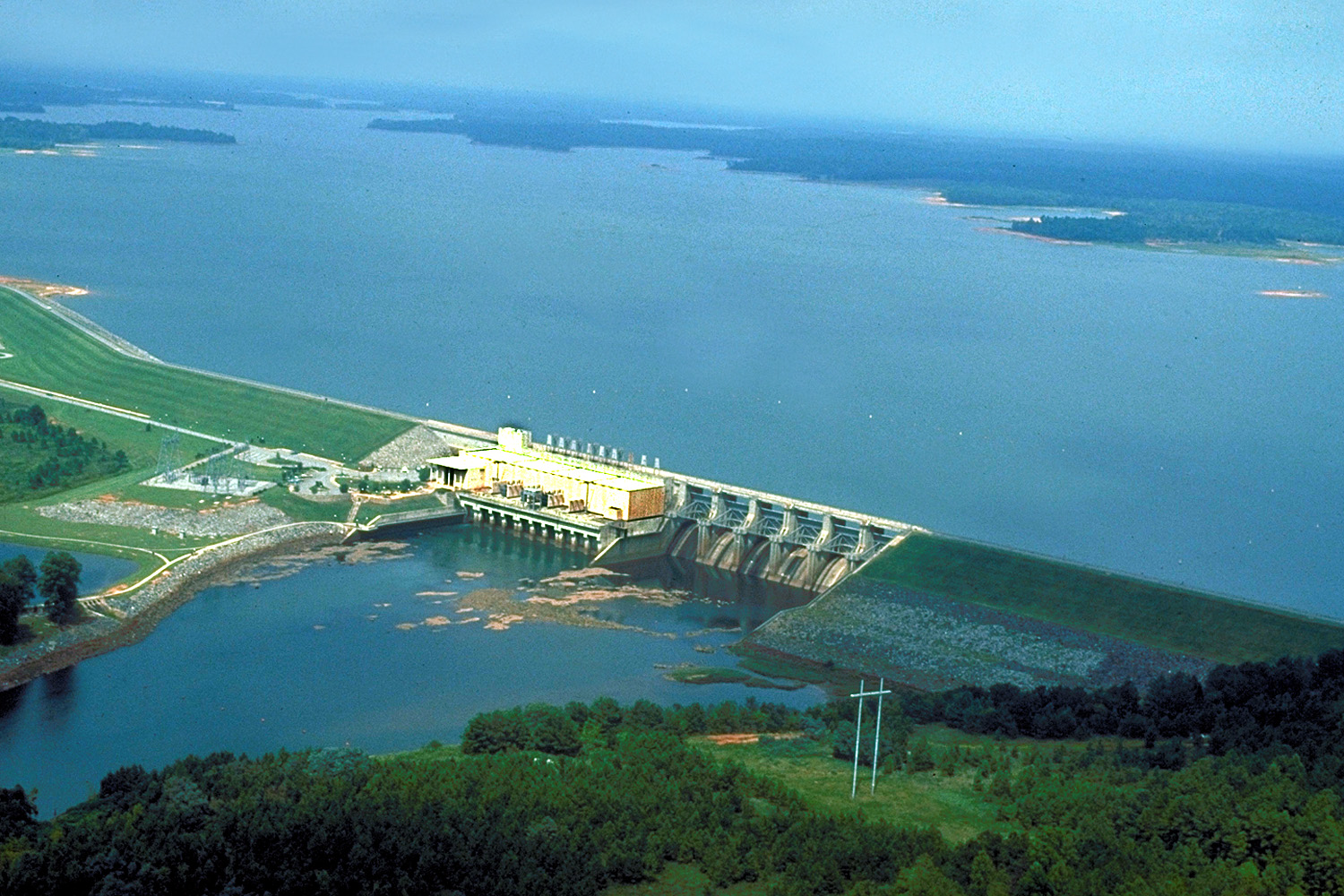
- Northerly view, south of the dam

- Pinpoint of the West Point Dam West Point Lake (the United States)
- Location: Troup County, and Heard County, Georgia, and Chambers County, and Randolph County, Alabama
- Coordinates: 32.9403°N 85.1908°W
- Type: Reservoir
- Etymology: The near city of West Point, Georgia
- Part of: ACF River Basin
- Primary inflows: Chattahoochee River
- Primary outflows: Chattahoochee River
- Catchment area: 3,440 sq mi (8,900 km^{2})
- Basin countries: United States
- Managing agency: U.S. Army Corps of Engineers (USACE)
- Built: December 1965
- First flooded: May 25, 1975
- Max. length: 34 mi (55 km)
- Max. width: 3 mi (4.8 km)
- Surface area: 25,864 acres (10,467 ha)
- Average depth: 23 ft (7.0 m)
- Max. depth: 85 ft (26 m)
- Water volume: 604,527 acre⋅ft (745,673,000 m^{3}) at 635 ft (194 m)
- Residence time: Approx. 55 days
- Shore length^{1}: 604 mi (972 km)
- Surface elevation: Summer: 635 ft (194 m); Winter: 628 ft (191 m)
- Frozen: Never
- Settlements: near West Point, Georgia
- ^{1} Shore length is not a well-defined measure.

West Point Lake is a man-made reservoir located mostly in west-central Georgia on the Chattahoochee River and maintained by the U.S. Army Corps of Engineers (USACE). The Chattahoochee river flows in from the north, before flowing through the West Point Dam, which impounds the lake, and continuing to Columbus, Georgia. Of the four major USACE lakes in the ACF River Basin, West Point Lake is the smallest by area containing 25,864 acres (10,467 ha) of water, and has the second shortest shoreline at 604 mi (972 km). The purposes of the reservoir are to provide flood control, hydroelectric power, and water storage to aid the navigation of the lower Chattahoochee.

== History ==
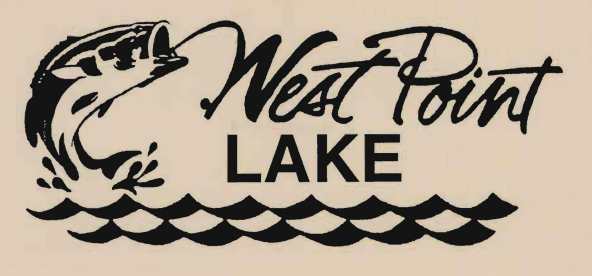
The stylized logo of West Point Lake from the shoreline management plan.

Authorized by the Flood Control Act of 1962, West Point Lake was built for several purposes and cost an estimated $105 million. Two major uses of the lake prescribed are power generation and recreation. The smaller percentage uses are: flood control, Fish and Wildlife, Area Redevelopment, and Navigation. In the master plan, it was decided to have a 300 to 500 feet (91 to 152 m) buffer from the water edge. This was done by using the flood pool level of 641 feet (195 m) above sea level or 300 feet (91 m) from the summer pool of 635 feet (194 m), whichever was greater. This resulted in a total of 56,638 acres (22,921 ha) of land being acquired and owned by the USACE.

After being approved in 1964, construction began in 1965 with the west embankment and powerhouse access road being completed first in 1966. Also in 1966, a team discovered sites of archaeological significance and important sites were studied until 1971 before the lake was filled. When the lake was flooded, the floodplain would contain two historic covered bridges that would be inundated. The Wehadkee Creek bridge was privately salvaged in 1965 and relocated to Callaway Gardens while Glass' bridge was burned in 1954 as it was the only efficient means of destruction.

The main channel was closed in May 1967 and diverted through the east bank. The dam itself began construction in May 1968 and was later completed in August 1970. The next closure was on June 21, 1973, as the river was routed through an opening for a future generator. The first generator was completed in May 1974; however, diking problems did not allow filling of the lake to begin until October 16, 1974. West Point Lake was filled from the river level at 565 feet (172 m) above mean sea level (aMSL) to 617 feet (188 m) aMSL. Due to continuing construction, the lake would not be allowed to fill any higher until April 30, 1975, after another power unit was completed.

A major factor in building West Point Lake was navigation. A goal of the ACF river basin is to maintain a 9 feet (2.7 m) deep waterway on the Apalachicola River. After building West Point Lake, it was decided to raise the winter pool from 625 to 628 feet (191 to 191 m) aMSL. Before this, Walter F. George Lake and West Point Lake could not both be filled to their summer pools by the end of May without sacrificing water flow downstream and starving the Apalachicola River of needed water for navigation. This was not done earlier out of fear of flooding downstream during heavy rain periods.

== West Point Dam ==
West Point Dam is a 896 ft × 132 ft × 20.5 ft (273.1 m × 40.2 m × 6.2 m)(LxHxD) concrete dam completed in 1975. The top of the dam is at 652 feet (199 m) above sea level. It has a 321 feet (98 m) long and 164.5 feet (50.1 m) deep power generation building which houses three main 48.8 MW units and one small 3.3 MW unit on the western portion of the dam and a 350 feet (110 m) spillway on the eastern portion, both which are controlled via microwave link at Walter F. George Lake with a local override. There are earth embankments that total 7,250 feet (2,210 m) long with the dam and there is a roadway on top of the embankments and concrete that allows the public to cross the dam. Depending on water level, the dam holds back anywhere from 442,295 to 774,798 acre-feet (545,563,000 to 955,699,000 m^{3}) of water. During construction, rock was excavated should West Point need to add a navigable lock in the future to the right bank.

== Location and surroundings ==
West Point Lake begins at West Point Dam, 201.4 river miles (324.1 river km) north of the mouth of the Chattahoochee River, which is just north of the Jim Woodruff Dam or 3.2 river miles (5.1 river km) north of West Point, GA. West Point Lake is within 50 air miles (80 air km) of many semi-major cities in Georgia and Alabama. In Georgia it has: Columbus, LaGrange, Newnan, Peachtree City, Carrollton and some parts of Atlanta. In Alabama it has: Phenix City, Opelika-Auburn, and Roanoke. Both sides of the lake are easily accessible from their respective sides, however crossing the lake can prove challenging as there are only two bridges that cross the main channel. Without crossing directly over the lake, one must go to Franklin or West Point to cross the river. At times, the West Point Dam can be crossed for a slightly shorter southern path.

== Wildlife and flora ==
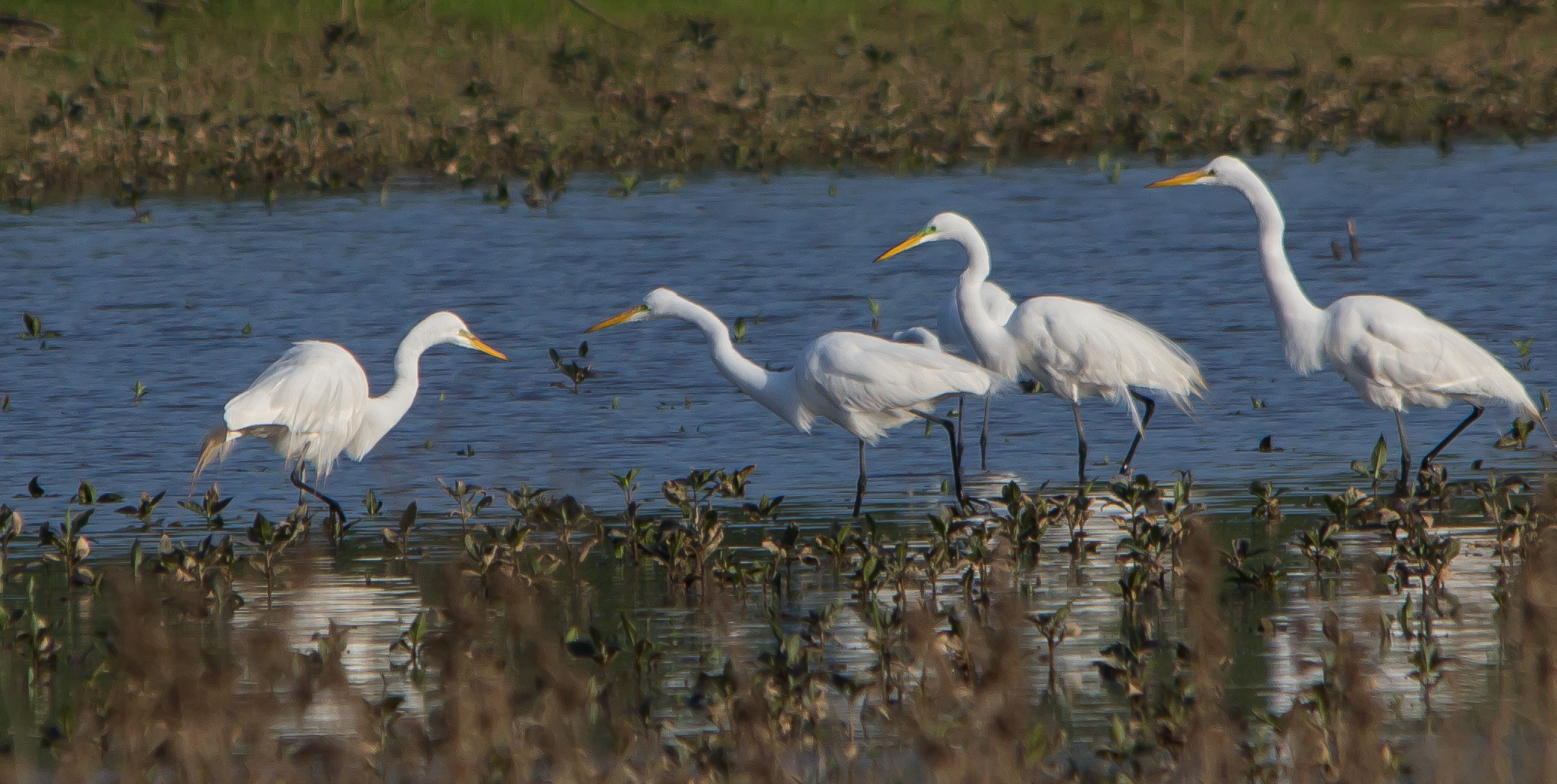
Wildlife enjoying West Point Lake

When West Point Lake was filled, habitats for deer, dove, quail, and waterfowl were lost which caused important migratory bird routes to be disturbed. As such, the West Point Wildlife Management Area was created with a size of 8,952 acres (3,623 ha). In addition to the West Point Wildlife Management Area, two other wildlife management areas were created, Dixie Creek Area at 711 acres (288 ha) and Glover's Creek Area at 337 acres (136 ha). The Bald eagle is frequently seen in this part of the lake. There are many animals, including some harmful to humans, in and around the area. Two snakes known to the area that are venomous are the copperhead and cottonmouth. There are a few species of plants and animals that are tracked and knowingly occur in the area of West Point Lake. Three fish in this list are the bluestripe shiner, southern brook lamprey, and the highscale shiner. Only one bird is on this tracked list, the bachman's sparrow, along with 19 plants that include a sunflower, azalea, and a strawberry plant. Many types of common animals found in the southeastern United States are also found in the West Point Lake area including different species of bass, crappie, waterfowl, snakes, and turtles. The American alligator has been spotted in the area however very rare. With the wildlife previously mentioned, West Point Lake is a location where one has the ability to partake in hunting, fishing, shooting, and general wildlife viewing.

== Access and recreation ==
=== Access ===
There are four types of access, known as shoreline allocations, at West Point Lake.

Limited Development
Private floating facilities and some land activities may be authorized such as a dock or improved walkway and requires a permit from the USACE. There are approximately 131 miles (211 km) or 25 percent of the total shoreline miles allocated to this type.
Protected
Contrary to limited development, private docks are prohibited unless grandfathered in. This area is a buffer meant to protect aesthetics, habitats, conflicts, and more between areas and was designed to comply with the National Environmental Policy Act. This allocation requires a permit from the USACE and only allows a 5 feet (1.5 m) wide meandering pathway. There are approximately 151 miles (243 km) or 28.8 percent of the total shoreline miles allocated to this type.
Prohibited
The shortest of the four allocations at 1 mile (1.6 km), this allocation has prohibited or restricted access. The main area is close to the West Point Dam to protect boats and life from danger.
Public Recreation
This area is for past or present public use and private use is prohibited. There are approximately 242 miles (389 km) or 46.1 percent of the total shoreline miles allocated to this type. This is the largest single allocation of West Point Lake.

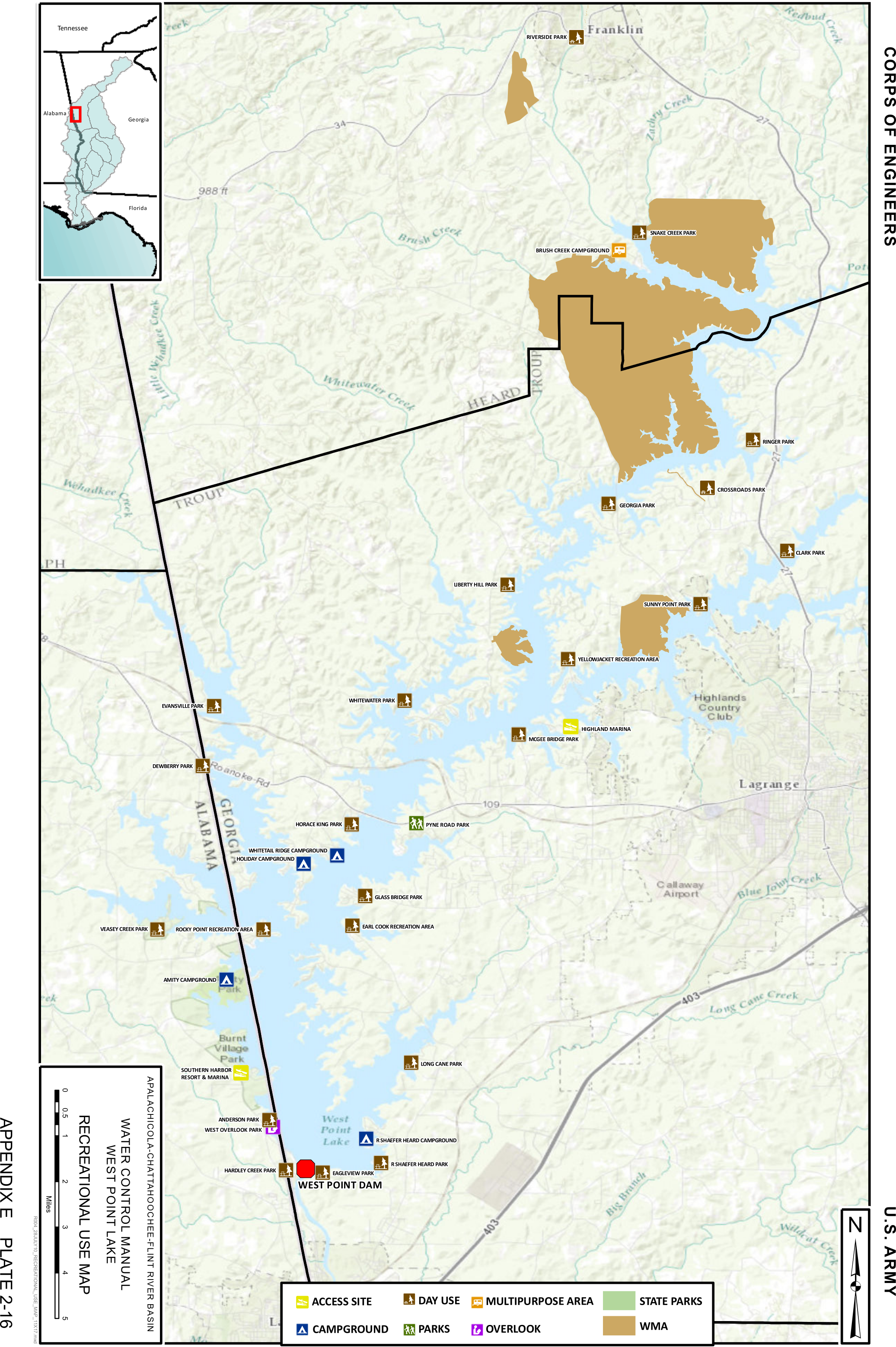
Locations of public parks, 2017

West Point Lake has the highest shoreline mileage and percentage of total shoreline miles allocated to public recreation areas of all USACE lakes in the ACF river basin. Thus making West Point Lake the most publicly accessible USACE lake in the basin. In addition to the large available public areas, the land buffer around the lake, regardless of allocation, is considered public land. With the exception of personal property (a boat dock) and the prohibited areas, the public is allowed anywhere on this buffer as an issued permit does not allow private exclusive rights anywhere on USACE property.

=== Recreation ===
In 2016, West Point Lake recorded 36 parks, 2 marinas, and 7 campgrounds. West Point Lake does not have its recreational areas concentrated in any one area of the lake, however, a large percentage of shoreline south of Georgia State Route 109 is public access. During the first three years of operation, there were only 26 parks available for a total of 5,786 acres (2,342 ha) but annual visitation increased yearly from one million in 1976 to 4.2 million by 1981. Later, visitation numbers were affected greatly as water pollution increased from nearby Atlanta. Visitation numbers are unknown today, however many flock to lake during the annual fireworks display at Pyne Road Park that are accessible by boat or land.

== Watershed and geology ==
The Chattahoochee River basin near West Point Lake is elongated and is on average 24 miles (39 km) wide by 140 miles (230 km) long and contains an area of 3,440 square miles (8,900 km^{2}) north of the West Point Dam. The Chattahoochee River flows in a southwest direction for 235 miles (378 km) to arrive at the West Point Dam after starting in the Blue Ridge Mountains in north Georgia and passing through Buford Dam in northern Atlanta. The northern portion of the river basin is in the Blue Ridge Region, but the middle region, where West Point is located, is in the Piedmont Region, north of the fall line. This produces rolling hills around the lake with the exception of the nearby Pine Mountain Range. The lake and other parts of the region contains soils with high iron-oxides and are clay-rich that make Georgia famous. Granite and soapstone are common minerals in area. The entire area of the Chattahoochee River basin is 8,708 square miles (22,550 km^{2})

== Pollution ==
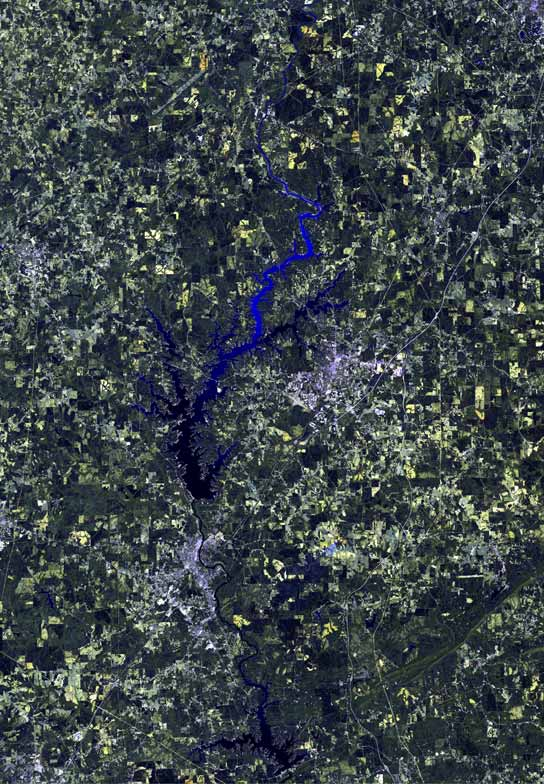
Satellite image

The lake is sometimes criticized and brought into negative public light due to being the first impoundment south of Atlanta. Scientists were strongly attracted to West Point Lake for this reason and were eager to study the lake and the river. Studies were done in the early 1990s in detail to determine the effects of the urban environment on the lake.

=== Pre-lawsuit ===
Starting in the late 1970s, the lake was beginning to have water quality issues, which affected lake usership and eventually caused local economic damage. On 19 July 1988, the water being released from the lake downstream had become eutrophic and thus killing fish in the river. In February 1991, the GA Department of Natural Resources issued a fish consumption advisory for the lake, which extended downstream to Lake Harding on March 3.

Also in 1991, as pollution damage was realized, the Georgia Environmental Protection Division (GEPD) and the City of Atlanta made a timetable to reduce phosphorus by the late 1990s. Atlanta continually failed to reduce pollution and was threatened by the GEPD with fines and sewer bans. This had the ability to damage the economics around the 1996 Olympic Games and further increase the amount of daily fines by $10,000. The daily fines were already at $9,000 per day and had totalled $20 million by 1997 for failing to complete sewer overflow treatment systems.

=== Lawsuit to today ===
On October 10, 1995, the Upper Chattahoochee Riverkeepers filed a lawsuit against the City of Atlanta for violation of the Clean Water Act by not upgrading facilities to meet standards. In 1998, two Federal Consent Decrees were ordered for the City of Atlanta to address its under-maintained wastewater system. In addressing the issues, a program was created at a cost of $4 billion that removed over 400 million gallons a year of sewer drainage into the rivers. In another part of the lawsuit, the City of Atlanta was issued a $2.5 million fine and volunteered to remove trash and establish greenways.

In 1998, an investigation for polychlorinated biphenyls(PCBs) was completed and found fish contaminated. However this data is slightly misleading as Georgia does not use PCBs anymore thus contaminated fish are older from previous years. As of 2012, 97 percent of sewage from the 1990s was removed and expected to keep improving. In 2015 and 2017, bacteria levels were tested and published in the media showing normal and safe levels. The lake is tested regularly to the United States Environmental Protection Agency standards, results are posted for public view, and court admissible.

== Climate ==
Many factors affect the lake and its basin. West Point Lake is in the southern end of the temperate zone and close to both the Atlantic Ocean and the Gulf of Mexico which can bring tropical storms and hurricanes to the area. Thunderstorms produce much of the rainfall during the summer months as well as frontal systems. Flood inducing storms are most likely to occur in the area during winter and early spring as fronts. During the summer, convective thunderstorms are the leading source of rainfall with the occasional tropical storm. Snowfall can occur but rarely covers the ground for more than a few days.

For the West Point Lake area as a whole, the record low is −10 °F (−23 °C) in LaGrange, GA on February 2, 1899, with the record high at 107 °F (42 °C) in LaFayette, AL and Rock Mills, AL in late July 1952. Most of the time, rainfall is evenly distributed over all four seasons with a yearly average of 52.93 inches (1,344 mm).

Climate data for West Point, GA (3 miles (4.8 km) from West Point Lake)
Month	Jan	Feb	Mar	Apr	May	Jun	Jul	Aug	Sep	Oct	Nov	Dec	Year
Record high °F (°C)	80 (27)	84 (29)	95 (35)	94 (34)	100 (38)	104 (40)	106 (41)	106 (41)	106 (41)	99 (37)	93 (34)	80 (27)	106 (41)
Mean daily maximum °F (°C)	56.6 (13.7)	59.8 (15.4)	67.5 (19.7)	75.7 (24.3)	83.0 (28.3)	89.4 (31.9)	91.0 (32.8)	90.3 (32.4)	85.9 (29.9)	76.8 (24.9)	66.5 (19.2)	57.9 (14.4)	75.0 (23.9)
Daily mean °F (°C)	45.1 (7.3)	47.6 (8.7)	54.8 (12.7)	62.5 (16.9)	70.4 (21.3)	77.6 (25.3)	80.1 (26.7)	79.4 (26.3)	74.4 (23.6)	63.6 (17.6)	53.6 (12.0)	46.3 (7.9)	62.9 (17.2)
Mean daily minimum °F (°C)	33.5 (0.8)	35.3 (1.8)	42.2 (5.7)	49.3 (9.6)	57.8 (14.3)	65.7 (18.7)	69.2 (20.7)	68.6 (20.3)	63.0 (17.2)	50.4 (10.2)	40.6 (4.8)	34.8 (1.6)	50.9 (10.5)
Record low °F (°C)	−8 (−22)	5 (−15)	11 (−12)	26 (−3)	35 (2)	43 (6)	53 (12)	50 (10)	35 (2)	24 (−4)	8 (−13)	1 (−17)	−8 (−22)
Average rainfall inches (mm)	4.55 (116)	5.10 (130)	5.80 (147)	4.46 (113)	3.65 (93)	3.81 (97)	5.57 (141)	4.12 (105)	3.21 (82)	2.63 (67)	3.40 (86)	4.95 (126)	51.24 (1,301)
Source: U.S. Army Corps of Engineers Water Control Manual, Appendix E

Climate data for LaGrange, GA (near the middle of West Point Lake)
Month	Jan	Feb	Mar	Apr	May	Jun	Jul	Aug	Sep	Oct	Nov	Dec	Year
Record high °F (°C)	80 (27)	82 (28)	89 (32)	93 (34)	99 (37)	102 (39)	104 (40)	103 (39)	100 (38)	99 (37)	86 (30)	80 (27)	104 (40)
Mean daily maximum °F (°C)	56.1 (13.4)	59.9 (15.5)	68.0 (20.0)	76.4 (24.7)	83.3 (28.5)	88.7 (31.5)	89.9 (32.2)	89.3 (31.8)	84.6 (29.2)	75.9 (24.4)	66.0 (18.9)	58.0 (14.4)	74.7 (23.7)
Daily mean °F (°C)	45.2 (7.3)	47.8 (8.8)	55.1 (12.8)	62.8 (17.1)	70.4 (21.3)	76.9 (24.9)	79.1 (26.2)	78.5 (25.8)	73.3 (22.9)	62.9 (17.2)	53.3 (11.8)	46.7 (8.2)	62.7 (17.1)
Mean daily minimum °F (°C)	34.2 (1.2)	35.9 (2.2)	42.2 (5.7)	49.2 (9.6)	57.4 (14.1)	65.0 (18.3)	68.3 (20.2)	67.6 (19.8)	61.9 (16.6)	49.9 (9.9)	40.7 (4.8)	35.4 (1.9)	50.6 (10.3)
Record low °F (°C)	−5 (−21)	−10 (−23)	11 (−12)	26 (−3)	33 (1)	41 (5)	50 (10)	49 (9)	32 (0)	24 (−4)	3 (−16)	−1 (−18)	−10 (−23)
Average rainfall inches (mm)	5.06 (129)	5.07 (129)	6.05 (154)	4.66 (118)	3.35 (85)	4.00 (102)	5.42 (138)	4.18 (106)	3.35 (85)	2.66 (68)	3.46 (88)	4.73 (120)	52.00 (1,321)
Source: U.S. Army Corps of Engineers Water Control Manual, Appendix E
