= Woodbury, Georgia =

- City
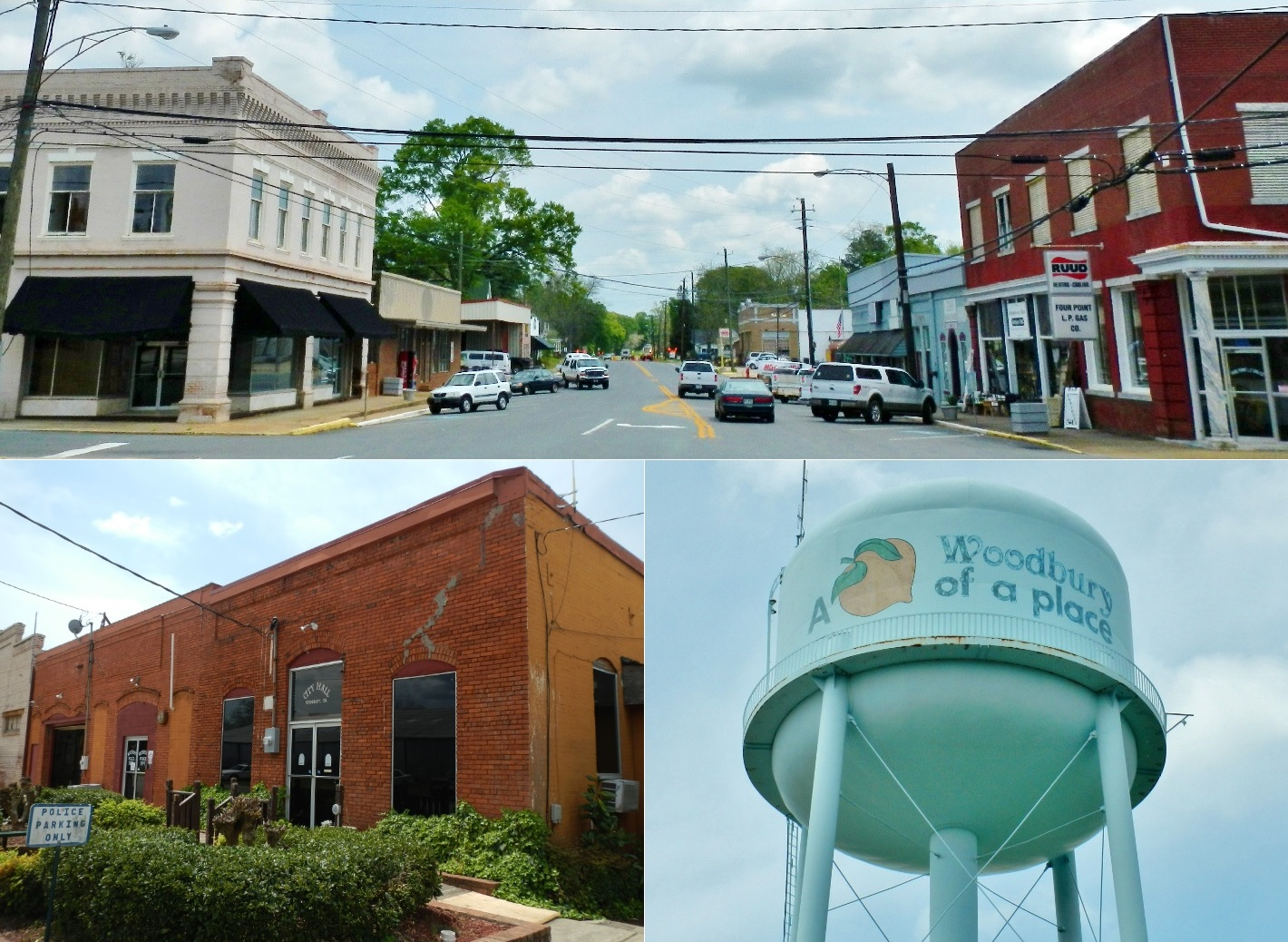
- "A Peach of a Place"

- Location in Meriwether County and the state of Georgia
- Coordinates: 32°58′50″N 84°34′52″W
- Country: United States
- State: Georgia
- County: Meriwether

Area
  - Total: 2.10 sq mi (5.44 km^{2})
  - Land: 2.07 sq mi (5.36 km^{2})
  - Water: 0.031 sq mi (0.08 km^{2})
- Elevation: 827 ft (252 m)

Population (2020)
  - Total: 908
  - Density: 438.9/sq mi (169.47/km^{2})
- Time zone: UTC-5 (Eastern (EST))
  - Summer (DST): UTC-4 (EDT)
- ZIP code: 30293
- Area code: 706
- FIPS code: 13-83896
- GNIS feature ID: 0333457
- Website: www.cityofwoodburyga.gov

Woodbury is a city in Meriwether County, Georgia, United States. The population was 908 at the 2020 census.

== History ==
The Georgia General Assembly incorporated Woodbury in 1913. The community most likely was named after Levi Woodbury (1789–1851), American justice on the United States Supreme Court.

== Geography ==
Woodbury is located in southeastern Meriwether County at 32°58′50″N 84°34′52″W (32.980588, -84.580979). Georgia State Routes 18, 74, 85, and 109 pass through the city. Route 18 leads northwest 8 miles (13 km) to Greenville, the county seat, and northeast 19 miles (31 km) to Zebulon. Route 74 goes east out of Woodbury with Route 18 but leads southeast 19 miles (31 km) to Thomaston; to the north Route 74 leads 8 miles (13 km) to Gay. Route 85 goes north to Gay with Route 74 but also leads south 10 miles (16 km) to Manchester. Route 85 Alternate runs through the north side of Woodbury and leads southwest 9 miles (14 km) to Warm Springs. Route 109 follows Route 18 both northwest and east out of Woodbury but leads east 28 miles (45 km) to Barnesville.

According to the United States Census Bureau, Woodbury has a total area of 2.1 square miles (5.4 km^{2}), of which 0.03 square miles (0.08 km^{2}), or 1.43%, are water. The Flint River passes 3 miles (5 km) east of the city, and Pine Mountain rises three miles to the south.

== Demographics ==
Historical population
Census	Pop.	Note	%±
1880	94		—
1890	369		292.6%
1900	566		53.4%
1910	917		62.0%
1920	923		0.7%
1930	849		−8.0%
1940	865		1.9%
1950	985		13.9%
1960	1,230		24.9%
1970	1,422		15.6%
1980	1,738		22.2%
1990	1,429		−17.8%
2000	1,184		−17.1%
2010	961		−18.8%
2020	908		−5.5%
U.S. Decennial Census; 1850-1870 1870-1880; 1890-1910 1920-1930; 1940 1950 1960; 1970 1980 1990; 2000 2010

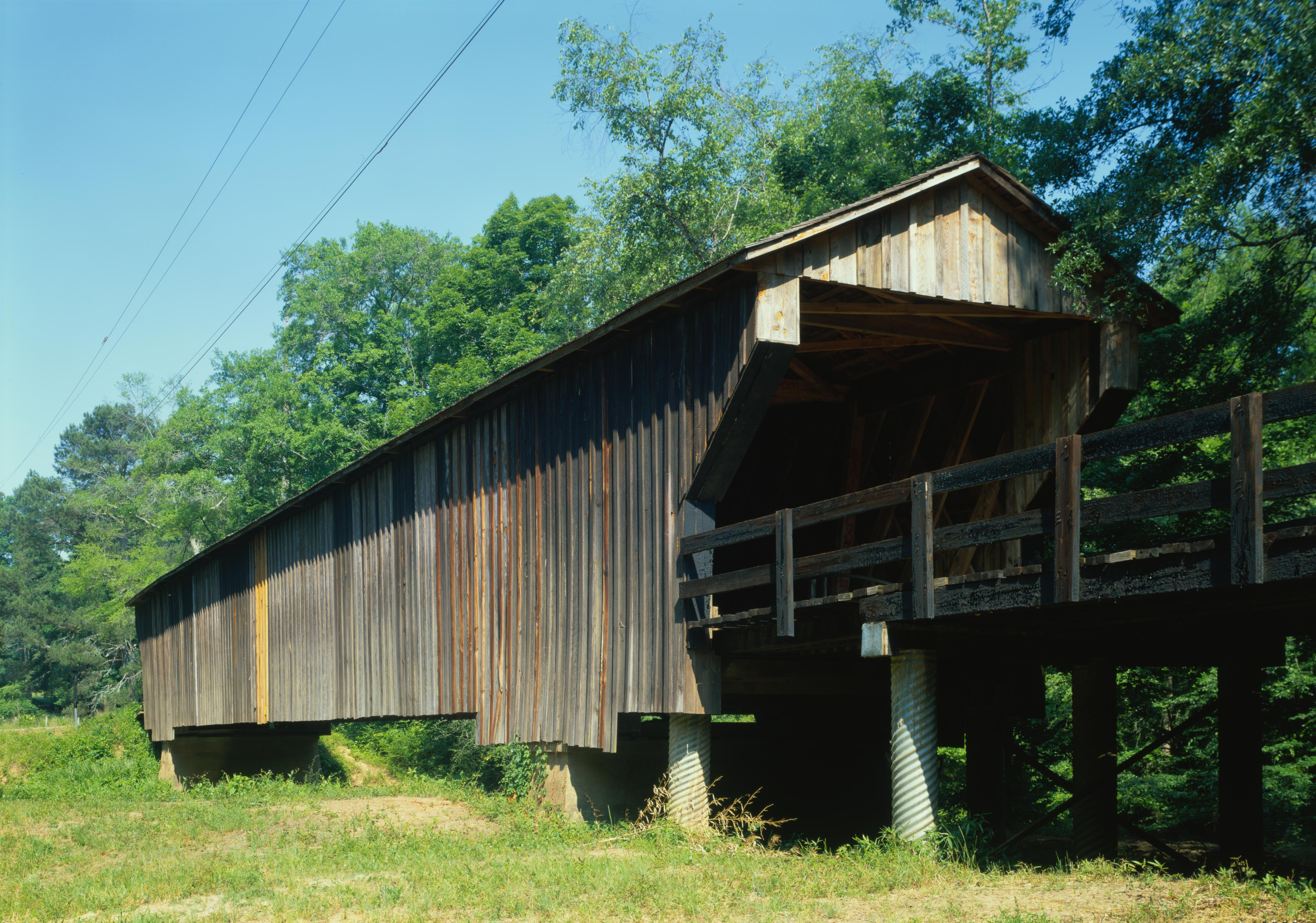
The Red Oak Creek Covered Bridge is located just north of Woodbury. Built in the 1840s by the famed Georgia bridge builder, Horace King, with its approaches the Red Oak Covered Bridge is the longest in Georgia and the only one of King's bridges that is still in use today. It was added to the National Register of Historic Places on May 7, 1973.

Woodbury racial composition as of 2020
Race	Num.	Perc.
White (non-Hispanic)	348	38.33%
Black or African American (non-Hispanic)	504	55.51%
Native American	2	0.22%
Asian	1	0.11%
Pacific Islander	1	0.11%
Other/Mixed	36	3.96%
Hispanic or Latino	16	1.76%

As of the 2020 United States census, there were 908 people, 456 households, and 260 families residing in the city.

== In popular culture ==
- Woodbury is featured prominently in The Walking Dead comic book franchise as a fortified survivor settlement run by a leader called The Governor during a zombie apocalypse. In the television series of the same name, the Woodbury scenes were filmed in Senoia, 25 miles (40 km) to the north.
- Woodbury is the primary setting of The Walking Dead novel series which follows the lives of the residents both before and after Woodbury's appearance in the comic book series. The novels focus on the town's reign under the Governor, the aftermath, and the residents' fight against various enemies, including the undead, doomsday cultists, and a militia that attacks to abduct the town's children for experimentation on finding a cure to the zombie virus.
- Woodbury also appears in The Walking Dead: Destinies video game which adapts part of the TV series season 3 storyline regarding the town.
