= Meansville, Georgia =

- City
- Location in Pike County and the state of Georgia
- Coordinates: 33°3′0″N 84°18′35″W
- Country: United States
- State: Georgia
- County: Pike

Area
  - Total: 0.53 sq mi (1.36 km^{2})
  - Land: 0.50 sq mi (1.30 km^{2})
  - Water: 0.023 sq mi (0.06 km^{2})
- Elevation: 794 ft (242 m)

Population (2020)
  - Total: 266
  - Density: 530.6/sq mi (204.85/km^{2})
- Time zone: UTC-5 (Eastern (EST))
  - Summer (DST): UTC-4 (EDT)
- ZIP code: 30256
- Area code: 770
- FIPS code: 13-50596
- GNIS feature ID: 0332364

Meansville is a city in Pike County, Georgia, United States. The population was 266 at the 2020 census.

== History ==
The Georgia General Assembly incorporated Meansville as a town in 1913. According to tradition, the community was named for homesteader John Means.

== Geography ==
Meansville is located at 33°3′0″N 84°18′35″W (33.050024, -84.309706).

According to the United States Census Bureau, the city has a total area of 0.5 square miles (1.3 km^{2}), all land.

== Demographics ==
Historical population
| Census | Pop. | Note | %± |
|---|---|---|---|
| 1900 | 155 | | — |
| 1910 | 233 | | 50.3% |
| 1920 | 229 | | −1.7% |
| 1930 | 169 | | −26.2% |
| 1940 | 193 | | 14.2% |
| 1950 | 224 | | 16.1% |
| 1960 | 335 | | 49.6% |
| 1970 | 313 | | −6.6% |
| 1980 | 303 | | −3.2% |
| 1990 | 250 | | −17.5% |
| 2000 | 192 | | −23.2% |
| 2010 | 182 | | −5.2% |
| 2020 | 266 | | 46.2% |
U.S. Decennial Census

As of the census of 2000, there were 192 people, 73 households, and 58 families residing in the city. By 2020, there were 266 people in the city.

== Education ==
Meansville Public Schools are part of the Pike County School District. The school district has one Pre-K building (lottery funded), one primary school (K-2), one elementary school (3–5), one middle school (6–8), a ninth grade academy and two high schools.

Michael Duncan is the Superintendent of Schools.
