= Molena, Georgia =

- City
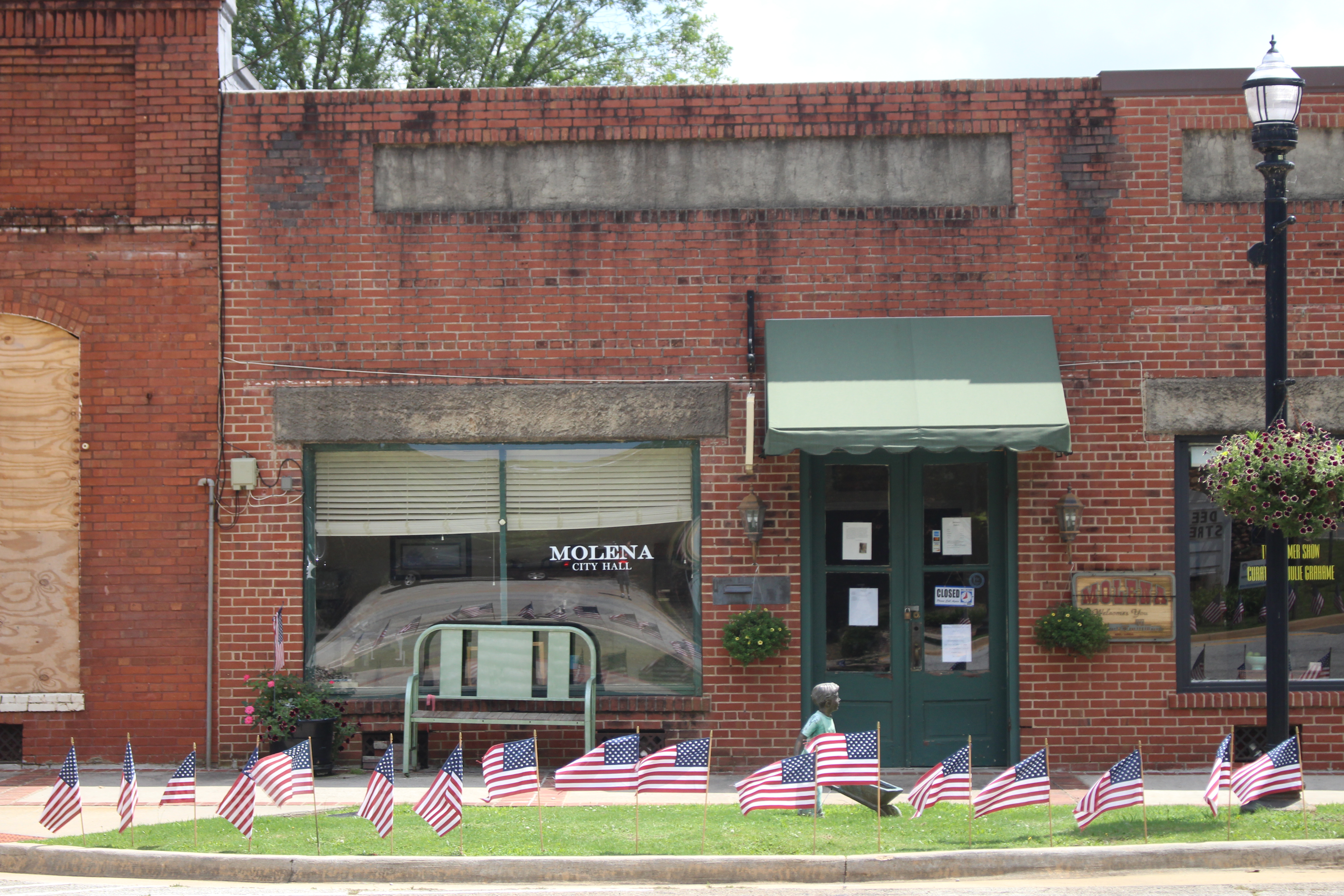
- Molena City Hall

- Location in Pike County and the state of Georgia
- Coordinates: 33°0′35″N 84°30′8″W
- Country: United States
- State: Georgia
- County: Pike

Area
  - Total: 1.89 sq mi (4.89 km^{2})
  - Land: 1.87 sq mi (4.85 km^{2})
  - Water: 0.015 sq mi (0.04 km^{2})
- Elevation: 768 ft (234 m)

Population (2020)
  - Total: 392
  - Density: 209.3/sq mi (80.83/km^{2})
- Time zone: UTC-5 (Eastern (EST))
  - Summer (DST): UTC-4 (EDT)
- ZIP code: 30258
- Area code: 770
- FIPS code: 13-52108
- GNIS feature ID: 0318384
- Website: https://www.molenaga.com/

Molena is a city in Pike County, Georgia, United States. The population was 392 in 2020.

== History ==
Early variant names were "Snidersville" and "Jenkinsville". The Georgia General Assembly incorporated Molena as a city in 1905.

== Geography ==
Molena is located at 33°0′35″N 84°30′8″W (33.009860, -84.502152).

According to the United States Census Bureau, the city has a total area of 1.7 square miles (4.4 km^{2}), all land.

== Demographics ==
Historical population
Census	Pop.	Note	%±
1890	198		—
1900	394		99.0%
1910	398		1.0%
1920	411		3.3%
1930	447		8.8%
1940	310		−30.6%
1950	307		−1.0%
1960	279		−9.1%
1970	389		39.4%
1980	379		−2.6%
1990	439		15.8%
2000	475		8.2%
2010	368		−22.5%
2020	392		6.5%
U.S. Decennial Census

As of the census of 2000, there were 475 people, 134 households, and 110 families residing in the city. By 2020, there were 392 people in the city.

== Education ==
The Public Schools in Molena are part of the Pike County School District. The district includes a pre-kindergarten to second-grade building, an elementary school, a middle school, a ninth-grade academy, and a high school.
