= Gay, Georgia =

- Town
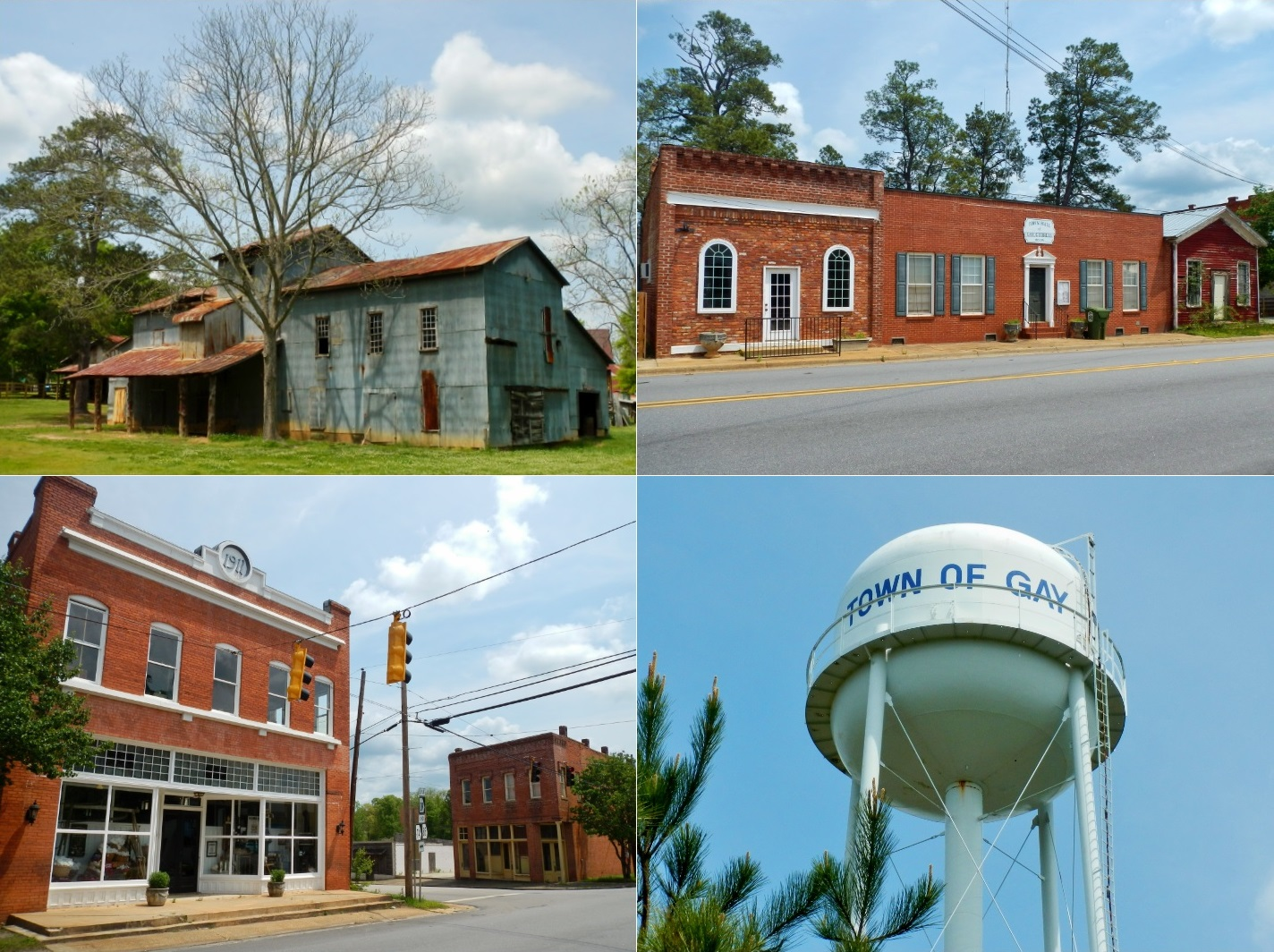
- Gay in 2013

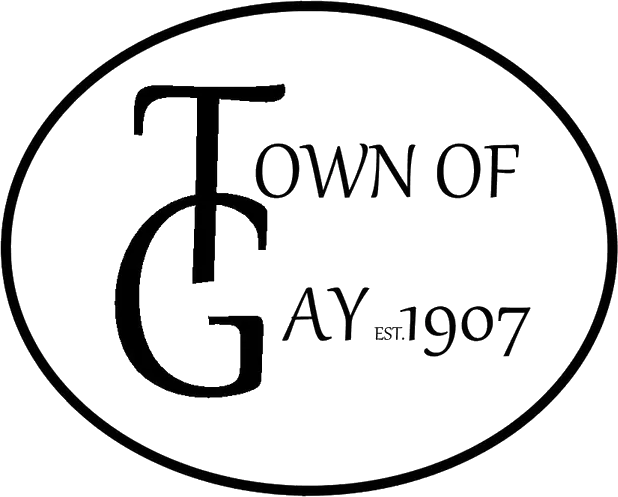
- Logo

- Location in Meriwether County and the state of Georgia
- Coordinates: 33°5′38″N 84°34′26″W
- Country: United States
- State: Georgia
- County: Meriwether

Government
  - Type: Mayor-council government
  - Mayor: Christopher J. Walker
  - Gay Town Council: Members: Jaime Askvig; Sallie Keith; Tracy Watts; Susan Pritchett

Area
  - Total: 0.86 sq mi (2.24 km^{2})
  - Land: 0.86 sq mi (2.24 km^{2})
  - Water: 0 sq mi (0.00 km^{2})
- Elevation: 840 ft (256 m)

Population (2020)
  - Total: 110
  - Density: 127.3/sq mi (49.15/km^{2})
- Time zone: UTC-5 (Eastern (EST))
  - Summer (DST): UTC-4 (EDT)
- ZIP code: 30218
- Area code: 706
- FIPS code: 13-32384
- GNIS feature ID: 0355988
- Website: gayga.gov

Gay is a town in Meriwether County, Georgia, United States. The population was 110 in 2020.

== History ==
An early variant name was "Sasserville". A post office called Gay has been in operation since 1886. The present name is after William F. Gay, an early postmaster. The Georgia General Assembly incorporated the Town of Gay in 1907.

== Geography ==
Gay is located in northeastern Meriwether County at 33°5′38″N 84°34′26″W (33.093797, −84.573924). State Routes 74 and 85 run concurrently through the town, leading north 16 miles (26 km) to Senoia and south 8 miles (13 km) to Woodbury. State Route 109 Spur leads southwest from Gay 9 miles (14 km) to Greenville, the Meriwether county seat.

According to the United States Census Bureau, the town has a total area of 0.9 square miles (2.3 km^{2}), of which 0.001 square miles (0.6 acres), or 0.12%, are water. The Flint River passes 3 miles (5 km) to the east of the town.

== Demographics ==
Historical population
Census	Pop.	Note	%±
1910	210		—
1920	290		38.1%
1930	251		−13.4%
1940	262		4.4%
1950	241		−8.0%
1960	194		−19.5%
1970	200		3.1%
1980	175		−12.5%
1990	133		−24.0%
2000	149		12.0%
2010	89		−40.3%
2020	110		23.6%
U.S. Decennial Census

As of the census of 2000, there were 149 people, 61 households, and 38 families residing in the town. The population was 110 in 2020.

== Arts and culture ==
The Cotton Fair, founded in 1972 and formerly called the "Cotton Pickin’ Fair", is held in Gay, Georgia each May and October. The name was changed during a rebranding intended to preserve the fair’s legacy and avoid terminology with painful historical connotations.

The town was featured in Season 2, Episode 1 of Queer Eye on Netflix.

The Netflix show Barbecue Showdown Season 3 was filmed in Gay.

In the movie Till, the scene with Emmett Till speaking to and whistling at Carolyn Bryant at Bryant's Grocery and Meat Market was filmed at Gay.
