= List of state routes in Georgia =

- Standard State Route shields

System information
- Notes: State Routes are generally state-maintained.

Highway names
- Interstates: Interstate X (I-X)
- US Highways: U.S. Highway X (US X)
- State: State Route X (SR X)

System links
- Georgia State Highway System; Interstate; US; State; Special

The State Routes in the U.S. state of Georgia (typically abbreviated SR) are maintained by the Georgia Department of Transportation (GDOT). Routes from 400 to 499 are mostly unsigned internal designations for Interstate Highways. Some of the Governor's Road Improvement Program (GRIP) corridors are numbered from 500 to 599.

== Mainline highways ==
Number	Length (mi)	Length (km)	Southern or western terminus	Northern or eastern terminus	Formed	Removed	Notes
SR 1	356.088	573.068	US 27 / SR 63 at the Florida state line southwest of Calvary	US 27 / SR 27 at the Tennessee state line on the Rossville–Chattanooga line	1919	current	Completely concurrent with US 27
SR 1E	10.2	16.4	US 27 / SR 1 south-southwest of Six Mile	US 27 / US 411 / SR 1 / SR 53 in Rome	1955	1985	Formerly part of US 27 / SR 1; redesignated as US 27 / US 411 / SR 1 / SR 53
SR 2	165.0	265.5	SR 193 in Flintstone	US 76 at the South Carolina state line southeast of Clayton	1919	current	A mountainous mostly unpaved route existed from 1949-1986 following what is today Old Hwy. 2 and forest roads that included a westward extension to Fort Oglethorpe over former county roads and what was previously GA 148. Another portion along Warwoman Road in Rabun County was built for GA 2, but did not become part of the route.
SR 3	351.00	564.88	US 19 / SR 57 / SR 300 at the Florida state line south-southwest of Boston	US 41 / US 76 / SR 8 at the Tennessee state line at East Ridge	1919	current	Completely concurrent with US 19 (Florida state line to Atlanta) and US 41 (south of Griffin to the Tennessee state line)
SR 3W	—	—	US 19 / US 82 / SR 3 / SR 50 / SR 91 in Albany	US 19 / SR 3 north of Albany	1946	1957	Redesignated as part of SR 3
SR 3W	—	—	SR 3 in Albany	US 19 / SR 3 north of Albany	1960	1973	Formerly SR 3 Conn.; redesignated as part of SR 3
SR 3W	—	—	US 19 / SR 3 / SR 3E in Thomaston	US 19 / SR 3 / SR 3E in Thomaston	1963	1987	Formerly US 19 / SR 3; redesignated as SR 3S
SR 3E	—	—	US 19 / SR 3 / SR 3W in Thomaston	US 19 / SR 3 / SR 3W in Thomaston	1963	1987	Formerly US 19 / SR 3; redesignated as SR 3N
SR 3N	—	—	US 19 / SR 3 / SR 3S in Thomaston	US 19 / SR 3 / SR 3S in Thomaston	1987	1988	Formerly SR 3E; redesignated as the northbound lanes of SR 3
SR 3S	—	—	US 19 / SR 3 / SR 3N in Thomaston	US 19 / SR 3 / SR 3N in Thomaston	1987	1988	Formerly SR 3W; redesignated as the southbound lanes of SR 3
SR 3W	—	—	US 41 / US 78 / SR 3 / SR 3E in Atlanta	US 41 / SR 3 / SR 3E in Marietta	1937	1946	Temporary redesignation of SR 3
SR 3W	—	—	US 41 / SR 3 / SR 3E in Atlanta	US 41 / SR 3 / SR 3E in Marietta	1954	1955	Temporary redesignation of SR 3
SR 3E	—	—	US 41 / SR 3 in Atlanta	US 41 / SR 3 in Marietta	1937	1985	
SR 3S	—	—	SR 3	SR 5	1965	1980	
SR 4	65.0	104.6	Alabama state line west of Coosa	SR 2 / SR 53 in Fairmount	1919	1929	Redesignated as SR 20 from the Alabama state line to Rydal and SR 61 from Cartersville to Fairmount
SR 4	222.385	357.894	US 1 / US 23 / US 301 / SR 15 / SR 15 at the Florida state line south-southeast of Folkston	US 25 Bus. at the South Carolina state line on the Augusta–North Augusta line	1929	current	Completely concurrent with US 1 except northernmost portion
SR 5	155.32	249.96	SR 48 at the Alabama state line north-northwest of Ephesus	SR 60 / SR 68 at the Tennessee state line on the McCaysville–Copperhill line	1919	current	
SR 6	72.1	116.0	US 278 / SR 74 at the Alabama state line northwest of Esom Hill	I-85 / SR 403 in College Park	1919	current	Completely concurrent with US 278 (Alabama state line to Lithia Springs)
SR 7	216.0	347.6	US 41 / SR 25 at the Florida state line southeast of Lake Park	US 19 / US 19 Bus. / US 41 / US 41 Bus. / SR 3 / SR 155 south of Griffin	1919	current	Completely concurrent with US 41 (Florida state line to Perry and south of Barnesville to south of Griffin) and US 341 (Perry to south of Barnesville)
SR 7W	—	—	US 41 / SR 7 / SR 7E south of Cordele	US 41 / SR 7 / SR 7E north of Cordele	1963	1985	
SR 7E	—	—	US 41 / SR 7 / SR 7W south of Cordele	US 41 / SR 7 / SR 7W north of Cordele	1963	1985	Temporary redesignation of SR 7; completely concurrent with US 41
SR 8	186	299	US 78 / SR 4 at the Alabama state line west of Tallapoosa	US 29 at the South Carolina state line east of Hartwell	1919	current	Completely concurrent with US 78 (Alabama state line to the Scottdale–North Decatur line and from southeast of Bogart to Athens) and US 29 (Atlanta to the South Carolina state line)
SR 9	86.4	139.0	US 19 / US 41 / SR 3 in Atlanta	US 19 / US 129 / SR 11 in Turners Corner	1919	current	
SR 9E	21.32	34.31	US 19 / SR 9 north-northeast of Coal Mountain	US 19 / SR 9 west of Dahlonega	1941	1981	Replaced by US 19 / SR 400
SR 10	172.3	277.3	I-75 / I-85 / SR 401 / SR 403 / Downtown Connector in Atlanta	US 1 / US 25 / US 78 / US 278 / SR 121 / SC 121 at the South Carolina state line at Augusta	1919	current	Mostly concurrent with US 78
SR 11	376.0	605.1	US 129 / SR 100 at the Florida state line south of Statenville	US 19 / US 129 at the North Carolina state line north-northwest of Ivy Log	1919	current	Longest state highway in Georgia; mostly concurrent with US 129
SR 11E	—	—	US 41 / SR 11 / SR 49 / SR 247 south-southwest of Macon	US 41 / SR 11 / SR 49 in Macon	1953	1963	Redesignated as part of SR 49
SR 12	118	190	US 278 / SR 10 in Avondale Estates	US 78 / US 278 / SR 10 / SR 17 Byp. east of Thomson	1919	current	Completely concurrent with US 278
SR 13	49.5	79.7	US 19 / SR 9 in Atlanta	SR 369 in Gainesville	1919	current	Northern terminus was formerly at the South Carolina state line east-northeast of Toccoa
SR 13W	—	—	US 19 / SR 9 in Atlanta	US 23 / SR 13 in Chamblee	1946	1971	Redesignated as SR 141 / Peachtree Industrial Boulevard and SR 13 Conn.
SR 14	87.4	140.7	US 29 / SR 15 at the Alabama state line on the Lanett–West Point line	SR 154 in Atlanta	1919	current	
SR 15	346	557	US 1 / US 23 / US 301 / SR 15 / SR 4 at the Florida state line south-southeast of Folkston	US 23 / US 441 at the North Carolina state line at Dillard	1919	current	
SR 15W	—	—	US 129 / US 441 / SR 15 / SR 24 in Athens	US 129 / SR 15 in Athens	1946	1949	Redesignated as a western rerouting of SR 15
SR 16	179.0	288.1	SR 100 northwest of Mount Zion	US 278 / SR 12 in Warrenton	1919	current	
SR 16S	—	—	SR 16 west-northwest of Wrens	SR 16 southeast of Warrenton	1942	1952	Redesignated as part of SR 16
SR 17	300.0	482.8	SR 21 Alt. / SR 21 / SR 30 in Port Wentworth	SR 515 and NC 69 at the North Carolina state line northwest of Hiawassee	1919	current	SR 17 was shifted and extended from I-16 in Bloomingdale to Port Wentworth around 2020 in favor of extending Jimmy DeLoach Parkway.
SR 18	147.0	236.6	US 29 / SR 14 in West Point	US 80 / SR 19 / SR 96 in Jeffersonville	1919	current	
SR 19	152.0	244.6	US 1 / US 23 / SR 4 north of Alma	US 41 / SR 18 in Forsyth	1919	current	
SR 20	—	—	SR 11 in Gray	SR 15 / SR 16 in Sparta	1919	1921	Redesignated as SR 22
SR 20	24.0	38.6	US 1 / SR 17 / SR 24 in Louisville	SR 21 in Waynesboro	1921	1929	Temporary redesignation of SR 24
SR 20	165.35	266.11	SR 9 at the Alabama state line west of Coosa	Lower Woolsey Road southwest of Hampton	1929	current	
SR 21	84.4	135.8	SR 204 in Savannah	US 25 / SR 121 north of Millen	1919	current	Formerly ended at the South Carolina state line in Augusta
SR 22	221.1	355.8	US 80 / SR 8 and SR 540 at the Alabama state line on the Phenix City–Columbus line	SR 72 in Comer	1919	current	
SR 23	240.0	386.2	SR 121 and SR 121 at the Florida state line southwest of Saint George	SR 56 south of Augusta	1919	current	
SR 24	221.8	357.0	US 80 / SR 26 in Statesboro	US 129 / US 129 Bus. / US 441 / US 441 Bus. / SR 15 / SR 24 Bus. north of Watkinsville	1919	current	
SR 25	129.07	207.72	US 17 / SR 5 at the Florida state line south of Kingsland	SC 170 at the South Carolina state line at Port Wentworth	1919	current	Completely concurrent with US 17 (Florida state line to Savannah) Originally existed only from Brunswick to Darien, and was incrementally extended both directions to its current termini
SR 26	271.1	436.3	US 27 / US 280 / SR 1 / SR 520 in Cusseta	US 80 in Tybee Island	1919	current	
SR 26E	—	—	US 80 / SR 26 in Savannah Beach	US 80 / SR 26 in Savannah Beach	1969	1985	Formerly SR 26 Loop
SR 27	264.0	424.9	US 82 / SR 39 / SR 50 in Georgetown	US 17 / US 341 / SR 25 in Brunswick	1919	current	Partially formerly SR 28
SR 27S	—	—	US 341 / SR 27 west of Eastman	US 23 / US 341 / SR 27 southeast of Eastman	1965	1977	
SR 28	—	—	SR 39 in Georgetown	SR 7 in Vienna	1919	1937	Was extended to Hawkinsville; redesignated as SR 27
SR 28	25.7	41.4	SC 28 at the South Carolina state line southeast of Clayton SC 28 at the South Carolina state line northwest of Martinez	NC 28 at the North Carolina state line north of Satolah SC 28 at the South Carolina state line at Augusta	1937	current	The northern segment was formerly SR 65 and then SR 105; the southern segment was formerly SR 52
SR 29	98.1	157.9	US 1 / SR 4 / SR 15 in South Thompson	US 441 / US 441 Bus. / SR 24 / SR 29 Bus. in Milledgeville	1919	current	Former southern terminus was in Jeffersonville.
SR 30	229.8	369.8	SR 41 south-southeast of Buena Vista	SR 25 in Port Wentworth	1919	current	
SR 31	166.9	268.6	SR 145 at the Florida state line south of Clyattville	US 319 / SR 15 / SR 57 / SR 78 in Wrightsville	1919	current	
SR 32	188.8	303.8	SR 45 / SR 520 in Dawson	US 25 / US 341 / SR 27 / SR 99 in Sterling	1919	current	
SR 33	81.0	130.4	US 84 / SR 38 in Boston	US 41 / SR 7 north of Wenona	1919	current	Formerly had a segment from Thomasville to Moultrie and then had a segment from the Florida state line, south-southeast of Quitman to Moultrie; SR 35 replaced the Moultrie–Sylvester segment, and then SR 33 was re-established on this segment.
SR 34	—	—	SR 1 / SR 16 in Carrollton	SR 8 in Villa Rica	1919	1926	Redesignated as southern branch of SR 8
SR 34	43.6	70.2	SR 22 at the Alabama state line southwest of Waresville	SR 54 west of Peachtree City	1930	current	
SR 35	85.941	138.309	US 319 / SR 61 at the Florida state line south-southwest of Moncrief	US 129 / US 319 / SR 11 / SR 32 / SR 90 in Ocilla	1919	current	Completely concurrent with US 319
SR 36	—	—	SR 8 in Danielsville	SR 17 in Elberton	1919	1941	Later extended eastward to the South Carolina state line; western terminus shifted southwestward to Athens; western terminus reverted to Danielsville and extended to Commerce; Athens–Comer segment redesignated as SR 82 In 1941, SR 82 and the Comer–South Carolina segment of SR 36 were redesignated as SR 72, while the Commerce–Comer segment was redesignated as SR 98.
SR 36	95.2	153.2	SR 208 west of Waverly Hall	US 278 / SR 12 / SR 142 in Covington	1941	current	Formerly SR 72
SR 37	153.6	247.2	SR 10 at the Alabama state line west of Fort Gaines	US 84 / SR 38 southwest of Homerville	1919	current	
SR 38	258.0	415.2	US 84 / SR 12 at the Alabama state line northwest of Jakin	I-95 / US 84 / SR 405 in Midway	1919	current	Completely concurrent with US 84
SR 39	118	190	Boat ramp at Lake Seminole south of Donalsonville	US 27 / SR 1 south-southwest of Louvale	1919	current	Portion north of Georgetown was SR 375.
SR 40	30.46	49.02	US 1 / US 23 / US 301 / SR 4 / SR 15 in Folkston	Church Street / Osborne Street in St. Marys	1919	current	
SR 41	134.5	216.5	SR 45 north of Morgan	US 27 Alt. / US 29 / SR 14 in Moreland	1919	current	
SR 42	115.3	185.6	SR 49 in Byron	SR 13 in Atlanta	1921	current	
SR 42A	—	—	US 19 / US 29 / US 78 / SR 8 / SR 9 / SR 10 / SR 12 / Ponce de Leon Avenue in Atlanta	US 29 / US 78 / SR 8 / SR 10 / SR 12 / SR 42 in Atlanta	1941	1946	Was entirely concurrent with US 29 / US 78 / SR 8 / SR 10 / SR 12
SR 43	—	—	SR 11 north-northwest of Gainesville	SR 9 in Turners Corner	1919	1941	Later shifted to an alignment from a point north-northeast of Gainesville to just northeast of Dahlonega; original segment was swapped with SR 11; redesignated as SR 52
SR 43	25.7	41.4	US 78 / SR 10 / SR 17 north of Thomson	US 378 at the South Carolina state line northeast of Lincolnton	1941	current	Formerly SR 70
SR 44	—	—	Alabama state line northwest of Brinson	SR 1 in Brinson	1919	1921	Redesignated as part of SR 38
SR 44	94.2	151.6	US 129 / SR 18 / SR 22 in Gray	SR 79 northwest of Lincolnton	1921	current	
SR 45	—	—	SR 8 / SR 13 in Lawrenceville	SR 15 in Watkinsville	1919	1926	Western terminus shifted to Ingleside; eastern terminus shifted to a point west-southwest of Athens; redesignated US 78 / SR 10 (Avondale to Loganville and Monroe to Athens area); SR 13 and possibly US 78/SR 10 (Loganville to Monroe)
SR 45	88.1	141.8	US 84 / SR 38 in Iron City	US 280 / SR 27 in Plains	1930	current	
SR 46	—	—	SR 32 / SR 33 in Sylvester	SR 7 / SR 35 in Tifton	1919	1921	Redesignated as part of SR 50
SR 46	96.5	155.3	US 341 / US 341 Bus. / SR 27 / SR 27 Bus. west of Eastman	SR 67 south-southeast of Denmark	1921	current	
SR 47	83.9	135.0	US 278 / SR 12 in Crawfordville	US 1 / US 221 / SR 4 in Wrens	1919	current	
SR 48	12.6	20.3	SR 117 at the Alabama state line northwest of Cloudland	US 27 / SR 1 in Summerville	1921	current	
SR 49	122.8	197.6	SR 45 north of Dawson	SR 22 / SR 24 / SR 112 in Milledgeville	1919	current	
SR 50	46.0	74.0	US 82 / SR 6 at the Alabama state line at the Eufaula–Georgetown line	US 82 / SR 45 / SR 520 in Dawson	1921	current	Formerly extended across state to Jekyll Island; completely concurrent with US 82
SR 50N	—	—	US 19 / US 82 / SR 3 / SR 50 / SR 234 in Albany	US 82 / SR 50 in Albany	1963	1973	Formerly part of SR 50; redesignated as SR 50 Conn.
SR 50S	—	—	US 19 / US 82 / SR 3 / SR 50 / SR 234 in Albany	US 82 / SR 50 in Albany	1963	1973	Temporary redesignation of SR 50
SR 51	—	—	—	—	1920	1921	became part of GA 5
SR 51	62.3	100.3	SR 52 in Lula	Hatton Ford Road / Reed Creek Highway in Reed Creek	1921	current	
SR 52	—	—	South Carolina state line northwest of Augusta	South Carolina state line at Augusta	1921	1937	Northern part shifted farther to the west and shifted back; redesignated as SR 28's southern segment
SR 52	124.70	200.69	I-75 / SR 401 in Dalton	SR 98 in Maysville	1941	current	
SR 53	—	—	—	—	1921	1921	renumbered GA 61
SR 53	172.15	277.05	US 411 / SR 25 at the Alabama state line west of Cave Spring	US 129 Bus. / US 441 Bus. / SR 15 / SR 24 Bus.	1921	current	
SR 54	70.5	113.5	US 27 / SR 1 west of Hogansville	I-75 / I-85 / SR 401 / SR 403 (Downtown Connector) in Atlanta	1921	current	
SR 54B	—	—	SR 16 in Sharpsburg	SR 54 in Fayetteville	1921	1934	Redesignated as part of SR 54
SR 55	21.0	33.8	SR 37 / SR 62 in Leary	US 82 / SR 520 in Dawson	1921	current	
SR 56	140.3	225.8	US 280 / SR 30 in Reidsville	US 25 / SR 121 in Augusta	1921	current	
SR 57	178.5	287.3	US 80 / SR 19 / SR 540 in East Macon	I-95 / SR 99 / SR 405 west of Eulonia	1921	current	
SR 58	22.8	36.7	US 11 / SR 7 at the Alabama state line south-southwest of Rising Fawn	US 11 / SR 38 at the Tennessee state line at Chattanooga	1921	current	Completely concurrent with US 11
SR 59	30.2	48.6	US 441 / US 441 Bus. / SR 15 / SR 15 Alt. in Commerce	SR 77 southeast of Gumlog	1921	current	
SR 60	—	—	SR 27 in Sterling	SR 25 south-southwest of Darien	1921	1926	Path later used for part of SR 99
SR 60	—	—	SR 11 in Social Circle	SR 12 southeast of Social Circle	1930	1940	Redesignated as SR 181
SR 60	90.1	145.0	SR 124 east of Braselton	SR 5 / SR 68 at the Tennessee state line on the McCaysville–Copperhill line	1940	current	Formerly parts of SR 136 and SR 115 and the entire length of SR 249 and SR 245
SR 61	107.1	172.4	SR 166 northeast of Carrollton	US 411 / SR 33 at the Tennessee state line at Tennga	1926	current	Portion south of Villa Rica was formerly part of US 78S and then US 78 Alt.
SR 62	—	—	US 129 / SR 11 in Talmo	SR 15 in Homer	1926	1929	
SR 62	62.1	99.9	SR 52 at the Alabama state line at Columbia	SR 234 in Albany	1930	current	
SR 63	—	—	Fancy Hall	US 280 / SR 30 in Pembroke	1921	1967	Formerly part of SR 30; shifted to southeast; redesignated part of SR 67
SR 63	23.1	37.2	SR 59 northeast of Commerce	US 123 / SR 106 / SR 184 / SR 365 in Tocca	1967	current	
SR 64	45.9	73.9	US 129 / SR 11 / SR 37 in Ray City	SR 158 in Wilsonville	1926	current	Was part of 37 briefly in the 1920s; Former segments: south-southwest of Surrency to southeast of Reidsville and from south of Claxton to Daisy; western one was redesignated as part of SR 121; eastern one was redesignated as SR 250
SR 65	—	—	North Carolina state line north of Satolah	South Carolina state line south-southeast of Pine Mountain	1921	1926	Restored as SR 105 in 1932 and then SR 28's northern segment
SR 65	17.0	27.4	SR 311 west of Hopeful	SR 93 in Pelham	—	—	
SR 66	4.8	7.7	US 76 / SR 2 / SR 515 in Young Harris	Young Harris Road at the North Carolina state line northwest of Young Harris	1921	current	
SR 67	59.2	95.3	Northern edge of Fort Stewart southeast of Pembroke	SR 21 east of Millen	1921	current	
SR 68	—	—	US 19 / SR 9 in Cumming	US 23 / SR 13 in Buford	1921	1932	Redesignated as part of SR 20
SR 68	18.7	30.1	SR 57 southeast of Oconee	SR 24 / SR 24 Spur west of Sandersville	1932	current	
SR 69	1.1	1.8	US 76 / SR 2 north-northeast of Young Harris	NC 69 at the North Carolina state line northwest of Hiawassee	1930	1960	Cosigned with SR 17 from 1955 to 1960; now also SR 515
SR 70	—	—	US 78 / SR 10 / SR 17 north-northwest of Thomson	South Carolina state line northeast of Lincolnton	1932	1941	Redesignated as SR 43
SR 70	42.6	68.6	US 29 / SR 14 in Newnan	US 78 / US 278 / SR 8 in Atlanta	1968	current	
SR 71	13.6	21.9	US 41 / US 76 / SR 3 in Dalton	SR 60 in Tennessee state line northeast of Cohutta	—	—	
SR 72	—	—	SR 41 in Woodland	SR 81 in Covington	1930	1941	Also had a Woodland–Warm Springs segment and maybe a Warm Springs–Pine Mountain segment; redesignated as part of SR 36
SR 72	46.7	75.2	US 29 / SR 8 in Athens	SC 72 at the South Carolina state line east-southeast of Elberton	—	—	
SR 73	78.1	125.7	US 301 / SR 23 / SR 57 / SR 144 in Glennville	US 301 at the South Carolina state line east-northeast of Hiltonia	1931	current	
SR 73W	—	—	US 25 / US 301 / SR 73 / SR 73E east-southeast of Register	US 25 / US 301 / SR 73 / SR 73E east-southeast of Register	1960	1993	
SR 73E	—	—	US 25 / US 301 / SR 73 / SR 73W east-southeast of Register	US 25]] / US 301 / SR 73 / SR 73W east-southeast of Register	1960	1993	Temporary redesignation of SR 73; entirely concurrent with US 25/US 301
SR 74	108.0	173.8	I-75 / SR 401 in Macon	US 29 / SR 14 in Fairburn	—	—	
SR 75	33.4	53.8	US 129 / SR 11 / SR 75 Alt. in Cleveland	NC 175 at the North Carolina state line north of Hiawassee	1930	current	Former segment from south-southeast of Cleveland into the city is now Old Highway 75.
SR 76	62.2	100.1	US 221 / SR 55 at the Florida state line south of Quitman	SR 135 east-northeast of Nashville	—	—	
SR 77	103.0	165.8	SR 16 northwest of Sparta	I-85 / SR 403 northeast of Lavonia	—	—	
SR 78	59.6	95.9	SR 46 in Soperton	SR 17 northwest of Midville	—	—	
SR 79	26.7	43.0	US 378 / SR 43 in Lincolnton	SR 72 southeast of Elberton	—	—	
SR 80	84.0	135.2	US 78 / SR 10 / SR 17 southeast of Washington	SR 56 Spur northeast of Shell Bluff	—	—	
SR 81	68.5	110.2	US 19 / US 41 / SR 3 south of Lovejoy	US 29 Bus. / SR 8 / SR 11 / SR 53 in Winder	—	—	
SR 82	36.2	58.3	SR 11 / SR 53 / SR 211 in Winder	SR 323 east of Gainesville	1930	current	Portion from Athens to Elberton redesignated as SR 72; originally reached the South Carolina state line farther to the south-southeast, at a point east-northeast of Elberton; that section redesignated as SR 368
SR 83	86.5	139.2	US 341 / SR 7 northeast of Culloden	US 78 / SR 10 northeast of Monroe	—	—	
SR 84	3.6	5.8	US 78 / SR 10 in Snellville	SR 20 in Grayson	—	—	
SR 85	96.5	155.3	US 27 / SR 1 in Columbus	I-75 / SR 401 in Forest Park	1930	current	Formerly traveled between the Shiloh area and Warm Springs
SR 85E	—	—	US 27 Alt. / SR 85W / SR 116 south of Shiloh	SR 85 / SR 85W in Woodbury	1952	1995	Formerly part of SR 85 and SR 163; redesignated as SR 85 Alt.
SR 85W	—	—	US 27 Alt. / SR 85E / SR 116 south of Shiloh	SR 85 / SR 85E in Woodbury	1957	1995	Temporary redesignation of SR 85
SR 86	—	—	US 19 / SR 9 in Porter Springs	NC 60 at the North Carolina state line west-northwest of Ivy Log	1930	1940	Redesignated as part of SR 60 and all of SR 60 Spur
SR 86	51.5	82.9	SR 29 southeast of East Dublin	US 280 / SR 30 southeast of Lyons	—	—	
SR 87	107	172	US 280 / SR 30 west of Rhine	US 23 / SR 42 northwest of Flovilla	—	—	
SR 88	53.2	85.6	SR 24 / SR 540 east of Sandersville	US 25 / SR 121 in Hephzibah	—	—	
SR 89	56.9	91.6	US 441 / SR 47 at the Florida state line southwest of Fargo	US 221 / US 441 / SR 31 / SR 64 south-southwest of Pearson	—	—	Completely concurrent with US 441
SR 90	155.0	249.4	US 82 / SR 520 in Willacoochee	US 80 / SR 22 / SR 41 / SR 208 in Talbotton	—	—	
SR 91	85.8	138.1	SR 2 at the Florida state line southwest of Donalsonville	SR 32 northeast of Albany	1930	current	
SR 91W	—	—	SR 91 south-southwest of Albany	SR 3W west of Albany	1946	1973	Redesignated as an eastern extension of SR 234
SR 92	97.81	157.41	US 19 / US 41 / SR 3 in Griffin	SR 9 / SR 120 / SR 140 in Roswell	1932	current	Formerly part of SR 42 and SR 54
SR 93	60.9	98.0	US 319 / SR 35 in Moncrief	US 19 / SR 3 / SR 300 in Baconton	—	—	
SR 94	67.7	109.0	US 41 Bus. / SR 7 Bus. in Valdosta SR 2 at the Florida state line southwest of Moniac	SR 2 at the Florida state line southeast of Fargo CR 2 at the Florida state line east of Saint George	—	—	
SR 95	7.8	12.6	SR 151 northeast of LaFayette	US 27 / SR 1 in Rock Spring	—	—	
SR 96	94.9	152.7	US 80 / SR 22 / SR 41 / SR 540 in Geneva	US 441 / SR 29 south-southeast of Irwinton	—	—	
SR 97	57.2	92.1	CR 269A at the Florida state line west-southwest of Faceville	SR 37 in Camilla	—	—	
SR 98	36.6	58.9	SR 72 in Comer	SR 164 in Homer	1932	current	Formerly part of SR 36; original segment: Maysville to Homer; extended southeast to Commerce; extended from Commerce to Comer; bypassed Danielsville; moved back; extended northwest of Homer and then west to meet SR 51 east of Lula; reverted
SR 99	38.9	62.6	US 82 southwest of Sterling	I-95 / SR 57 / SR 405 in Eulonia	1932	current	Formerly part of SR 60 and SR 131; segment east of Alma to southwest of Jesup was redesignated as SR 203; segment from Eulonia to Ludowici was redesignated as SR 57.
SR 100	136.5	219.7	US 27 Alt. / SR 18 / SR 41 / SR 109 in Greenville	US 27 / SR 1 / SR 114 in Summerville	—	—	
SR 101	43.5	70.0	I-20 / SR 61 in Villa Rica	US 27 / SR 1 / SR 20 in Rome	—	—	
SR 102	32.0	51.5	SR 15 in Warthen	SR 17 / SR 80 in Wrens	—	—	
SR 103	13.9	22.4	SR 116 / SR 219 south-southeast of Whitesville	SR 18 in West Point	1932	current	Formerly traveled through Muscogee, Chattahoochee, and Marion counties, to end in Buena Vista; former path redesignated as SR 137 Spur, SR 357, and SR 219
SR 104	22.3	35.9	US 221 / SR 47 / SR 150 in Pollards Corner	US 25 Bus. / SR 4 in Augusta	1932	current	
SR 105	—	—	North Carolina state line north of Satolah	South Carolina state line south-southeast of Pine Mountain	1932	1937	Formerly SR 65; redesignated as SR 28's northern segment
SR 105	23.1	37.2	SR 184 east-southeast of Baldwin	SR 17 west-northwest of Clarkesville	—	—	
SR 106	45.2	72.7	US 29 / SR 8 northeast of Athens	US 123 / SR 63 / SR 184 / SR 365 in Toccoa	—	—	
SR 107	61.8	99.5	I-75 / SR 112 / SR 401 in Ashburn	US 221 / SR 135 north of Denton	—	—	
SR 108	22.24	35.79	SR 20 in Sutallee	SR 53 / SR 53 Bus. in Tate	1933	current	Route originally extended from SR 52 in Cartecay to SR 143 west of Tate. It was extended along parts of former SR 143 and 156 in 1977 but subsequently decommissioned along its entire original route in 1980 and 1982 following Burnt Mountain, Refuge, and Sunrise Ridge Roads.
SR 109	71.0	114.3	CR 20 at the Alabama state line west of Glenn	SR 18 west-northwest of Barnesville	—	—	
SR 110	46.2	74.4	SR 40 east of Folkston	SR 32 east of Hortense	—	—	
SR 111	54.8	88.2	Dorsey Calvary Road at the Florida state line southwest of Calvary	US 319 Bus. / SR 33 in Moultrie	—	—	
SR 112	189.8	305.5	US 84 / SR 38 in Cairo	SR 540 south of Milledgeville	—	—	After the Fall Line Freeway (SR 540) was built and open to traffic in 2018, SR 112 was truncated from Milledgeville to SR 540 (Fall Line Freeway).
SR 113	58.1	93.5	US 27 / SR 1 in Carrollton	I-75 / SR 401 in Cartersville	—	—	
SR 114	12.7	20.4	SR 68 at the Alabama state line southwest of Chattoogaville	US 27 / SR 1 / SR 100 in Summerville	—	—	
SR 115	32.3	52.0	US 19 / SR 60 / SR 400 south of Dahlonega	SR 17 / SR 197 / SR 385 in Clarkesville	—	—	
SR 116	30.7	49.4	SR 103 / SR 219 west of Hamilton	SR 41 northwest of Woodland	—	—	
SR 117	89.4	143.9	US 23 / US 341 / SR 27 in Lumber City	US 441 / SR 29 northwest of Dublin	—	—	
SR 118	27.0	43.5	SR 32 in Dawson	US 280 / SR 30 / SR 195 in Leslie	—	—	
SR 119	81.2	130.7	US 17 / SR 25 in Riceboro	SC 119 north of Clyo	—	—	
SR 120	90.7	146.0	SR 100 in Tallapoosa	US 29 / SR 8 in Lawrenceville	—	—	Route originally had a missing link between Alpharetta and Duluth
SR 121	238.6	384.0	SR 121 and SR 23 at the Florida state line south of Saint George	US 1 / US 25 / US 78 / US 278 / SC 121 and SR 10 at the South Carolina state line at Augusta	—	—	
SR 122	98.2	158.0	US 19 / US 84 / SR 3 / SR 38 / SR 300 in Thomasville	US 1 / US 23 / US 82 / SR 4 / SR 520 west of Waycross	—	—	
SR 123	7.6	12.2	SR 102 in Mitchell	SR 16 east of Jewell	—	—	
SR 124	51.2	82.4	I-20 / US 278 / SR 12 / SR 402 in Lithonia	SR 11 in Jefferson	—	—	
SR 124S	—	—	—	—	—	—	
SR 125	72.6	116.8	US 41 / SR 7 in Valdosta	SR 107 in Fitzgerald	—	—	
SR 126	54.9	88.4	SR 26 in Cochran	SR 19 north of Lumber City	—	—	
SR 127	65.6	105.6	SR 41 north of Buena Vista	US 129 / SR 247 in Kathleen	—	—	Route had Georgia's last operational ferry that was abandoned in 1987 when a new bridge was built.
SR 128	35.1	56.5	SR 26 / SR 49 / SR 49 Truck southwest of Oglethorpe	US 341 / SR 7 in Roberta	—	—	
SR 129	20.0	32.2	Old Hwy. 250 / John Todd Road south-southeast of Claxton	SR 46 in Metter	—	—	
SR 130	12.2	19.6	SR 135 in Petross	US 1 / SR 4 in Lyons	—	—	
SR 131	—	—	Jones	Harris Neck National Wildlife Refuge southeast of Riceboro	1936	1989	Original segments: Darien to Eulonia, southwest of Darien to south-southwest of Darien, and southwest of Sterling; moved in 1943; Jones to South Newport segment was decommissioned in 1977; South Newport to Harris Neck National Wildlife Refuge segment was decommissioned in 1989.
SR 132	18.6	29.9	SR 117 south-southeast of Rhine	US 319 / US 441 / SR 31 in McRae	—	—	
SR 133	82.8	133.3	US 84 / US 221 / SR 38 / SR 94 in Valdosta	US 19 / SR 3 north of Albany	—	—	
SR 134	—	—	SR 149 west-northwest of Lumber City	SR 19 north-northeast of Lumber City	1937	1988	
SR 135	130	210	CR 141 at the Florida state line southeast of Lake Park	US 280 / SR 15 / SR 29 / SR 30 in Higgston	—	—	
SR 136	136.38	219.48	SR 71 at the Alabama state line west of Trenton	SR 60 southeast of Murrayville	1937	current	Formerly parts of SR 1, SR 2, SR 143, SR 143 Conn., and SR 154
SR 137	55.5	89.3	Wells Street in Cusseta	SR 128 southwest of Roberta	—	—	
SR 138	59.2	95.3	SR 92 in Fairburn	SR 11 in Monroe	—	—	
SR 139	29.8	48.0	SR 85 in Riverdale	US 78 / US 278 / SR 8 in Mableton	—	—	
SR 140	78.6	126.5	US 27 / SR 1 southeast of Armuchee	I-85 / SR 403 south of Norcross	—	—	
SR 141	34.1	54.9	US 19 / SR 9 in Atlanta	SR 20 west of Cumming	—	—	Extended north from SR 9 in 2020
SR 142	36.2	58.3	SR 81 north of Covington	SR 16 in Willard	—	—	
SR 143	61.044	98.241	SR 71 at the Alabama state line west of Trenton	SR 5 / SR 53 in Tate	1937	1977	In 1977, the western segment was redesignated as SR 136 and SR 136 Conn., while the eastern segment was redesignated as SR 379, SR 108, and SR 108 Conn.
SR 144	83.7	134.7	US 1 / SR 4 / SR 15 in Baxley	Fancy Hall Drive / Brown Road in Fancy Hall	—	—	
SR 145	24.3	39.1	US 29 / SR 8 in Franklin Springs	SR 63 / SR 106 southeast of Toccoa	—	—	
SR 146	5.1	8.2	US 27 / SR 1 in Fort Oglethorpe	US 41 / US 76 / SR 3 northwest of Indian Springs	—	—	
SR 147	19.2	30.9	US 1 / SR 4 / SR 15 southeast of Uvalda	US 280 / SR 30 in Reidsville	—	—	
SR 148	—	—	US 27 / SR 1 in Fort Oglethorpe	US 41 / SR 3 in Ringgold	1939	1949	Redesignated as part of SR 2.
SR 148	—	—	SR 18 east-southeast of Forsyth	SR 87 northwest of Macon	1955	1966	Redesignated as part of I-75 and SR 19 Spur
SR 149	23.7	38.1	SR 117 southwest of Lumber City	US 280 / SR 30 southwest of Alamo	—	—	A southern disconnected portion in Coffee and Atkinson Counties lasted into the late 1980s
SR 150	25.3	40.7	SR 17 in Thomson	US 221 at the South Carolina state line northeast of Pollards Corner	—	—	
SR 151	31.5	50.7	US 27 / SR 1 south of LaFayette	SR 321 at the Tennessee state line at East Brainerd	—	—	Route was extended south to US 27 near Trion in 1972 from its previous end at SR 95 near Naomi. SR 151 replaced SR 95 to the junction with what is now SR 136.
SR 152	13.2	21.2	SR 292 in Lyons	SR 23 / SR 57 / SR 121 in Cobbtown	—	—	
SR 153	19.1	30.7	SR 41 in Preston	SR 26 in Ellaville	—	—	
SR 154	—	—	SR 156 in Blaine SR 108 northeast of Jasper	SR 5 northwest of Talking Rock SR 183 northwest of Dawsonville	1939	1946	Redesignated as part of SR 136
SR 154	56.2	90.4	SR 54 in Sharpsburg	SR 10 east of Avondale Estates	—	—	Cascade Road portion relocated to GA 166 in 1989. Part of route relocated around Cascade-Palmetto Highway (previously duplexed with GA 70) in 2007. Southern portion from US 29 to Sharpsburg added in 1972.
SR 155	57.2	92.1	US 19 / US 19 Bus. / US 41 / US 41 Bus. / SR 3 / SR 7 south of Griffin	US 23 / SR 13 in Brookhaven	—	—	
SR 156	34.3	55.2	US 27 / SR 1 north of Rome	US 411 / SR 61 north of Ranger	—	—	Route was extended west into Floyd County in 1977 when Piney Road was paved and reconstructed to US 27. GA 156 formerly extended east to Waleska in Cherokee County following parts of SR 136, 136 Connector, SR 143, and 108.
SR 157	39.1	62.9	SR 48 in Cloudland	SR 58 at the Tennessee state line at Lookout Mountain	—	—	Route was relocated onto former SR 239 in 1977 when the spur into Alabama was removed and originally followed what is now SR 189 north of SR 136 before being relocated onto parts of SR 170 and the former southern part of Lula Lake Road.
SR 158	—	—	US 41 / SR 3 in Tunnel Hill	SR 71 in Varnell	1940	1941	Redesignated as part of SR 201
SR 158	50.5	81.3	US 129 / SR 11 north of Alapaha	US 82 / SR 520 northwest of Waycross	—	—	
SR 159	18.9	30.4	US 280 / SR 30 in Pitts	US 41 / SR 7 in Ashburn	—	—	
SR 160	—	—	SR 78 south of Adrian	SR 46 west of Oak Park	1940	1941	Redesignated as part of SR 86
SR 160	5.7	9.2	US 19 / US 41 / SR 3 in Forest Park	US 23 / SR 42 northeast of Conley	1946	1995	Partially redesignated as SR 54 Conn. on Thurman Road. The portion in Forest Park on Main Street was transferred to local control.
SR 161	—	—	Cedartown	US 411 / SR 53 in Cave Spring	1939	1963	Redesignated as part of SR 100. SR 100 was relocated in 1977, and the former highway is now county-maintained Cave Springs-Cedartown Road.
SR 162	18.3	29.5	SR 36 south of Porterdale	I-20 / US 278 / SR 12 / SR 402 in Conyers	—	—	
SR 163	—	—	US 27 Alt. / SR 85 / SR 116 south of Shiloh	SR 18 / SR 74 / SR 85 in Woodbury	1940	1952	Formerly part of SR 85; redesignated as SR 85W (later SR 85 Alt).
SR 164	6.9	11.1	SR 51 in Homer	SR 59 southeast of Homer	—	—	Route was extended west in 2005 along what was previously US 441 in Homer to end at SR 98. Eastern portion on Bold Springs Road in Franklin County was decommissioned in 1989.
SR 165	37.5	60.4	SR 132 southeast of Rhine	SR 46 northeast of Eastman	—	—	
SR 166	63.4	102.0	SR 46 at the Alabama state line west of Bowdon	Lakewood Avenue in Atlanta	1940	current	Formerly part of SR 16 (Alabama state line to Carrollton) and SR 34 (Carrollton to northeast of the city); both highways were later redesignated as a southern branch of SR 8, with first US 78S and then US 78 Alt. concurrent with it.
SR 167	—	—	US 17 / SR 25 southwest of Savannah	SR 21 in Millen	1940	1951	Mostly redesignated as part of SR 17 with a portion on what is now Chatham Parkway retained as projected mileage into the 1980s.
SR 168	28.3	45.5	US 129 / SR 11 / SR 125 in Nashville	SR 37 west of Homerville	—	—	
SR 169	55.4	89.2	US 341 / SR 27 in Jesup	US 25 / US 301 / SR 73 northeast of Claxton	—	—	
SR 170	—	—	SR 157 east-southeast of Trenton	SR 157 west of Chattanooga Valley	1940	1974	Partially redesignated as SR 157 in 1977 with the remaining county portion today known as Durham Road.
SR 171	76.9	123.8	US 221 / SR 56 northeast of Soperton	US 278 Byp. / SR 12 Byp. in Warrenton	—	—	
SR 172	28.1	45.2	SR 72 northeast of Colbert	US 29 / SR 8 / SR 77 in Hartwell	—	—	
SR 173	4.95	7.97	SR 41 in Manchester	SR 85 Alt. northeast of Warm Springs	—	—	
SR 174	12.6	20.3	SR 106 northeast of Ila	SR 51 west of Franklin Springs	—	—	
SR 175	—	—	SR 122 / SR 125 in Barretts	US 84 / SR 38 in Naylor	1940	1968	Completely unpaved highway following Upper Grand Bay Road, S. Spells Road, Shiner Pond Road, and Cooper Road. The general highway maps do not show the portion north of US 221, but county maps at the time do. It was partially closed due to passing through Moody AFB.
SR 176	15	24	US 278 / SR 6 in Powder Springs	US 41 / SR 3 in Acworth	1940	2010	Original northern terminus: SR 92 in New Hope. Route was relocated to Mars Hill Road in 1972 and was extended south along part of SR 6 Business (Old US 278) to end at current US 278 in 1985. It was relocated to part of Richard D. Sailors Parkway in 2001 when SR 6 Business was decommissioned. It was finally removed entirely in October 2010.
SR 177	29.5	47.5	US 441 / SR 89 / SR 94 southeast of Fargo North entrance to Okefenokee Swamp Park south-southeast of Waycross	Dead end in Stephen C. Foster State Park northeast of Fargo US 82 / SR 520 north of Laura S. Walker State Park east-southeast of Waycross	—	—	
SR 178	29.4	47.3	US 1 / SR 4 in Lyons	SR 121 / SR 144 / SR 169 southwest of Glennville	—	—	
SR 179	—	—	SR 111 in Calvary	SR 97 in Vada	1940	1987	
SR 180	26.0	41.8	SR 60 in Suches	SR 17 / SR 75 north of Helen	—	—	Eastern portion along with SR 180 Spur was originally part of SR 66 until 1982
SR 181	—	—	SR 11 in Social Circle	SR 12 southeast of Social Circle	1940	1941	Formerly SR 60; redesignated as the northern segment of SR 213
SR 181	2.95	4.75	US 29 / SR 8 east-southeast of Hartwell	SC 181 at the South Carolina state line east-southeast of Hartwell	—	—	
SR 182	8.70	14.00	US 129 / SR 11 north of Fitzgerald	US 319 / SR 107 northeast of Fitzgerald	—	—	
SR 183	10.41	16.75	SR 53 west of Dawsonville	SR 52 northwest of Dawsonville	1937	current	Partially decommissioned in 1982 (portion north of SR 136 was designated GA 52 Connector) then restored within the same year.
SR 184	19.4	31.2	SR 63 southwest of Toccoa	Cleveland Pike Road at the South Carolina state line northeast of Toccoa	—	—	Route was shortened in 1989 when mileage was shifted to a newly re-designated GA 63. The old alignment extends from current SR 184 to SR 51 and is today known as Damascus Road. The northern end originally had a covered bridge known as Prathers Bridge.
SR 185	12.90	20.76	SR 23 / SR 121 southwest of Saint George	SR 94 in Moniac	—	—	
SR 186	11.2	18.0	SR 83 in Good Hope	US 129 / US 441 / SR 24 north of Bishop	—	—	
SR 187	27.0	43.5	US 129 / SR 11 west of Fruitland	US 441 / SR 89 in Homerville	—	—	
SR 188	35.2	56.6	SR 93 in Cairo	SR 33 northwest of Pavo	—	—	
SR 189	15.7	25.3	SR 136 southeast of Trenton	SR 148 at the Tennessee state line on the Lookout Mountain–Lookout Mountain line	—	—	Route originally followed a mostly unpaved route from US 11 in Rising Fawn to what is now SR 136. It was extended along what was originally SR 157 and 210 in 1977 with the original route shifted to projected mileage in the early 1970s and finally decommissioned.
SR 190	16.7	26.9	US 27 / SR 1 south of Pine Mountain	SR 41 / SR 85 in Manchester	—	—	Route was established as a scenic highway along the spine of Pine Mountain. Spur portion east of Manchester to the Talbot County line was decommissioned in 1984. It was part of a planned, but canceled extension of the highway to US 19 between Zebulon and Thomaston.
SR 191	6.63	10.67	SR 98 southeast of Danielsville	US 29 / SR 8 northeast of Danielsville	—	—	
SR 192	30.3	48.8	US 1 / SR 4 north-northeast of Oak Park	SR 56 in Summertown	—	—	
SR 193	27.2	43.8	US 27 / SR 1 / SR 136 in LaFayette	SR 17 at the Tennessee state line at Chattanooga	—	—	Route was relocated several times with former portions on Nickajack Road, Lula Lake Road, Chattanooga Valley Road, and Prospect Road
SR 194	5.33	8.58	SR 18 in Durand	US 27 Alt. / SR 41 west of Warm Springs	—	—	
SR 195	38.3	61.6	SR 32 in Leesburg	SR 49 southeast of Andersonville	—	—	Significant portion in Taylor, Macon, and Sumter Counties decommissioned in 1982 from south of Reynolds to Andersonville. Portions were never paved.
SR 196	39.2	63.1	US 25 / US 301 / SR 23 / SR 57 southwest of Glennville	US 17 / SR 25 southwest of Richmond Hill	—	—	
SR 197	29.0	46.7	US 23 / US 441 / SR 15 / SR 365 east of Demorest	US 76 / SR 2 west-southwest of Clayton	—	—	Portion from US 23/441 southeast of Clarkesville to Old US 123/Old SR 13 in Mount Airy was decommissioned in 1991.
SR 198	14.3	23.0	US 441 / SR 15 southeast of Baldwin	SR 59 southwest of Carnesville	—	—	
SR 199	26.9	43.3	US 221 / SR 56 north of Mount Vernon	SR 29 in East Dublin	—	—	
SR 200	38.5	62.0	SR 62 in Blakely	SR 91 in Newton	—	—	
SR 201	20.9	33.6	SR 136 in Villanow	SR 2 in Varnell	1941	current	Formerly part of SR 2 and all of SR 158. A portion in Tunnel Hill was relocated to a new alignment in 2020.
SR 202	15.6	25.1	US 19 / SR 3 / SR 300 north of Thomasville	SR 111 southwest of Moultrie	—	—	
SR 203	46.6	75.0	SR 15 / SR 121 in Blackshear	US 84 / SR 38 southwest of Jesup	1986	current	
SR 204	32.4	52.1	US 280 / SR 30 east of Pembroke	SR 21 in Savannah	—	—	Part of it was formerly SR 359. Portion east of SR 21 and former SR 204 Spur were both decommissioned around 2020 when mileage was shifted to Jimmy DeLoach Parkway.
SR 205	—	—	SR 92 east-southeast of Oak Grove	SR 5 in Canton	1948	1985	Originally a connector from SR 5 to SR 92 that was extended twice along former portions of SR 92 after SR 92 was relocated further south.
SR 206	27.8	44.7	US 221 / US 441 / SR 31 / SR 135 in Douglas	US 319 / SR 107 east of Fitzgerald	—	—	
SR 207	2.1	3.4	SR 53 west-northwest of Watkinsville	US 129 / US 441 / SR 15 north of Watkinsville	1942	1983	
SR 208	43.2	69.5	US 27 / SR 1 south-southeast of Hamilton	SR 137 northeast of Butler	—	—	
SR 209	—	—	US 78 / SR 10 in Crows	US 29 / SR 8 in Bogart	1942	1983	Former segments: Followed a portion of Mars Hill Road from US 78 to US 29 in Bogart. Original route cannot be traveled fully due to lack of crossover of SR 316.
SR 210	—	—	SR 157 in Lookout Mountain	Tennessee state line on the Lookout Mountain–Lookout Mountain line	1941	1977	Original route: SR 193 in Lookout Mountain to the Tennessee state line. Original alignment became part of SR 157. Final alignment became part of SR 189 from the current junction of SR 157 & 189 to the Tennessee line.
SR 211	33.1	53.3	US 29 / SR 8 / SR 316 in Statham	SR 60 / SR 332 southeast of Gainesville	—	—	
SR 212	72.3	116.4	SR 155 southeast of Snapfinger	SR 22 in Milledgeville	—	—	
SR 213	34.5	55.5	SR 16 in Eatonton	SR 36 south-southeast of Covington	1941	1982	Northern segment formerly SR 60 and then SR 181
SR 214	—	—	SR 26 east-southeast of Fountainville	SR 26 in Oglethorpe	1942	1982	Now known as Coogle Road
SR 215	38.6	62.1	SR 27 in Vienna	SR 90 northwest of Fitzgerald	—	—	
SR 216	40.4	65.0	SR 37 northwest of Newton	US 27 / SR 1 south of Cuthbert	—	—	
SR 217	3.5	5.6	SR 128 north of Oglethorpe	SR 127 south-southeast of Reynolds	1942	1969	Unpaved route following Miona Springs Road
SR 218	—	—	US 27 / SR 1 in Lakeview	SR 146 southeast of Lakeview	1942	1985	Lakeview Drive
SR 219	58.9	94.8	US 27 / SR 1 in Columbus	SR 34 southwest of Franklin	—	—	
SR 220	18.8	30.3	US 378 / SR 47 southwest of Lincolnton	US 378 / SR 43 northeast of Lincolnton	—	—	Also included SR 220 Spur that was decommissioned in 1997
SR 221	10.4	16.7	SR 16 west of Monticello	SR 11 in Prospect	1939	1984	Known today as CR 364
SR 222	—	—	SR 85E north-northeast of Manchester	SR 173 south-southeast of Raleigh	1943	1986	Now known as Jesse Cole Road. Decommissioned after a railroad underpass was replaced.
SR 223	20.9	33.6	SR 17 in Thomson	US 78 / US 278 / SR 10 in Augusta	1943	current	Former segments: Norwood–Cadley and Cedar Rock–Thomson
SR 224	29.3	47.2	SR 26 east of Montezuma	US 341 / SR 11 southeast of Perry	—	—	
SR 225	36.1	58.1	US 41 / SR 3 in Calhoun	SR 74 at the Tennessee state line west of Tennga	1943	current	
SR 226	—	—	SR 53 northwest of Gainesville	SR 9E northwest of Gainesville	1943	1980	Originally connected SR 53 and SR 9E and followed a portion of what is now SR 136 from SR 9E to Henry Grady Highway (Old SR 136). Route was cut off by Lake Lanier in 1957, and remaining spur on Nix Bridge Road from Old SR 9E was finally decommissioned in 1980.
SR 227	2.2	3.5	US 221 / SR 56 northeast of Soperton	SR 46 east of Soperton	—	—	Southern portion in Montgomery County decommissioned in 1997 from SR 15 in Kibbee to US 280 in Ailey.
SR 228	10.2	16.4	US 19 / SR 3 southeast of Ellaville	SR 49 in Andersonville	1943	current	
SR 229	34.6	55.7	SR 11 in Monticello SR 142 / SR 213 in Newborn SR 11 in Social Circle	SR 142 north-northwest of Farrar SR 12 east of Covington SR 12 southeast of Social Circle	1943	1982	Northern segment formerly SR 60, SR 181, and SR 213
SR 230	59.2	95.3	SR 27 west-southwest of Vienna	SR 87 east-northeast of Abbeville	1943	current	
SR 231	20.6	33.2	SR 15 southwest of Harrison	SR 88 north of Davisboro	1940	current	
SR 232	14.3	23.0	US 221 / SR 47 south of Appling	I-20 / I-520 in Augusta	1939	current	
SR 233	19.4	31.2	SR 90 northeast of Rebecca	US 129 / SR 11 south-southeast of Pineview	1943	current	
SR 234	28.3	45.5	SR 45 northeast of Morgan	US 19 / SR 3 / SR 133 / SR 300 in Albany	1946	current	
SR 235	2.2	3.5	SR 9 in Atlanta	SR 9 in Atlanta	1943	1963	Route followed Habersham Road, Chatham Road, and Andrews Drive in Buckhead.
SR 236	15.01	24.16	SR 237 in Atlanta	US 78 / SR 10 in Stone Mountain Park northeast of Stone Mountain	—	—	Portion west of SR 237 on Lindbergh Drive decommissioned in the 1980s
SR 237	3.2	5.1	Piedmont Road NE in Atlanta	US 19 / SR 9 in Atlanta	1946	current	
SR 238	—	—	Alabama state line west of LaGrange	US 29 / SR 14 southwest of LaGrange	1946	1975	Known as Glass Bridge Road referencing a large covered bridge that was lost when West Point Lake was filled. Former route extended from US 29 to Alabama State line and was partially submurged by West Point Lake cutting off direct access to the west side from Georgia.
SR 239	—	—	SR 48 in Cloudland	SR 157 southeast of Rising Fawn	1946	1976	Redesignated as part of SR 157 from Old State Road (former SR 157) to SR 48.
SR 240	37.6	60.5	SR 26 in Fountainville	SR 96 in Geneva	1946	current	
SR 241	5.6	9.0	CR 65 at the Florida state line southwest of Attapulgus	US 27 Bus. / SR 1 Bus. in Attapulgus	1946	current	
SR 242	25.0	40.2	SR 24 in Sandersville	US 221 / US 319 / SR 78 / SR 171 south of Bartow	1946	current	
SR 243	17.8	28.6	SR 57 / SR 540 southwest of Gordon	SR 24 /SR 540 southeast of Milledgeville	1946	2019	Portion southwest of Milledgeville and through Gordon was turned to local maintenance. The remainder was redesignated as SR 540 except for a portion concurrent with US 441 Bus. that was redesignated as SR 29 Bus.
SR 244	—	—	Alabama state line west-northwest of LaGrange	SR 109 west-northwest of LaGrange	1948	1975	Replaced with a relocated SR 109. Original route was known as Abbottsford Road and is partially submerged under West Point Lake. It extended west of the original SR 109 to the Alabama State Line.
SR 245	—	—	SR 60 in Mineral Bluff	SR 5 in McCaysville	1948	1977	Redesignated as SR 60
SR 246	3.12	5.02	US 23 / US 441 / SR 15 in Dillard NC 106 at the North Carolina state line northeast of Dillard NC 106 at the North Carolina state line northeast of Dillard	NC 106 at the North Carolina state line northeast of Dillard NC 106 at the North Carolina state line northeast of Dillard NC 106 at the North Carolina state line northeast of Dillard	—	—	SR 246 and NC 106 cross over the state line five times.
SR 247	43.2	69.5	US 129 / US 341 / SR 11 north of Hawkinsville	I-75 / SR 401 in Macon	—	—	
SR 248	—	—	SR 102 north-northeast of Warthen	SR 16 in Jewell	1949	1982	Locally known as Hamburg State Park Road
SR 249	—	—	SR 115 in Murrayville	US 19 / SR 9 / SR 52 in Dahlonega	1949	1957	Redesignated as SR 60. Former highway followed what is now SR 60 from Old Dahlonega Highway (former SR 115) to US 19/SR 9 in Dahlonega.
SR 250	—	—	US 301 / SR 73 north of Glennville	US 280 / SR 30 in Daisy	1949	1985	Formerly the eastern segment of SR 64
SR 251	13.5	21.7	I-95 Bus. / US 17 / SR 25 north of Darien	SR 57 in Townsend	—	—	Originally a spur to Cox. Partially decommissioned when route was relocated to Briardam Road in 1977 changing the orientation from east-west to north-south.
SR 252	24.3	39.1	US 1 / US 23 / US 301 / SR 4 / SR 15 in Folkston	US 17 / SR 25 / SR 110 in White Oak	—	—	
SR 253	43.3	69.7	Trails End Resort on the shore of Lake Seminole southwest of Brinson	SR 91 southwest of Newton	—	—	
SR 254	10.8	17.4	SR 284 in Clermont	SR 115 east of Leaf	1949	current	
SR 255	19.7	31.7	SR 115 east of Cleveland	SR 197 in Batesville	1949	current	
SR 256	21.0	33.8	US 319 / SR 35 in Norman Park	SR 33 in Sylvester	1949	current	
SR 257	69.2	111.4	I-75 / SR 401 in Cordele	US 319 / US 441 / SR 31 in Dublin	—	—	Partly formerly SR 277
SR 258	—	—	US 27 / SR 1 west-northwest of Harrisonville	US 29 / SR 14 in Hogansville	1949	1965	Redesignated as part of SR 54
SR 259	—	—	SR 252 in Tarboro	US 84 / SR 50 in Atkinson	1949	1980	
SR 260	1.2	1.9	US 23 / SR 42 in Atlanta	I-20 / SR 402 in Atlanta	1949	current	Shortest non-bannered state route; DeKalb County portion from I-20 to US 278 decommissioned in 2005
SR 261	8.6	13.8	Altamaha River south-southwest of Glennville	SR 196 south-southeast of Glennville	1949	1981	Followed Marcus Nobles and Beards Bluff Road. Portion west of US 301 never paved.
SR 262	44.4	71.5	US 27 / SR 1 southeast of Attapulgus	SR 93 southwest of Pelham	1949	current	
SR 263	—	—	SR 128 north of Reynolds	US 19 / SR 3 south-southwest of Salem	1949	1987	Route followed Crowell Church Road and Montfort Road joined by a portion of SR 137.
SR 264	2.7	4.3	US 78 / SR 10 southwest of Snellville	SR 124 north of Centerville	1949	current	
SR 265	—	—	SR 117 east-northeast of Jacksonville	SR 149 northeast of Jacksonville	1949	1976	Redesignated as part of SR 149
SR 266	18.2	29.3	SR 39 north of Fort Gaines	US 82 / SR 50 southwest of Cuthbert	1950	current	Former alignment: Bellville to Coleman (decommissioned between 1973 and 1975
SR 267	—	—	SR 41 southeast of Juniper	US 80 / SR 22 north of Juniper	1950	1997	Partially redesignated as SR 355
SR 268	22.9	36.9	SR 32 southeast of Ambrose	SR 107 in Snipesville	1950	current	Former segment: Snipesville to Hazlehurst (was established between 1957 and 1960 and decommissioned in 1986)
SR 269	—	—	US 278 / SR 12 south-southwest of Sharon	SR 47 in Sharon	1950	1982	
SR 270	12.7	20.4	SR 93 in Sale City	SR 33 east of Doerun	1950	current	
SR 271	7.6	12.2	US 19 / SR 3 southeast of Ellaville	SR 228 in Andersonville	1950	current	
SR 272	15.4	24.8	SR 68 northwest of Wrightsville	SR 24 southeast of Milledgeville	1950	current	
SR 273	17.2	27.7	SR 273 Spur / SR 370 southwest of Cedar Springs	SR 91 southwest of Colquitt	1950	current	
SR 274	1.2	1.9	US 78 / SR 8 in Temple	US 78 / SR 8 in Temple	—	—	
SR 275	5.5	8.9	SR 21 southeast of Springfield	Dead end in Ebenezer	—	—	
SR 276	—	—	West-northwest of Ludowici	US 25 / US 301 / SR 23 northwest of Ludowici	1950	1981	Now known as Hughes River Road. Unpaved spur to Altamaha River
SR 277	—	—	Dodge–Laurens–Bleckley county tripoint	US 80 / SR 19 / SR 26 in Dublin	1950	1960	Redesignated as part of SR 257
SR 278	10.9	17.5	SR 26 northeast of Cochran	US 80 / SR 19 in Montrose	1950	current	Locally known as Montrose Road
SR 279	9.5	15.3	SR 85 northeast of Fayetteville	US 29 / SR 14 in College Park	—	—	
SR 280	18.3	29.5	SR 139 in Atlanta	I-75 / SR 401 in Marietta	—	—	
SR 281	11.9	19.2	US 29 / SR 8 northeast of Danielsville	SR 17 Bus. in Royston	—	—	
SR 282	19.9	32.0	US 76 / US 411 / SR 61 in Ramhurst	US 76 / SR 2 / SR 5 / SR 515 in East Ellijay	1957	current	Completely concurrent with US 76 after U.S. 76 was relocated onto the route in 1982 and 1984. Route originally ended east of Gilmer/Murray County line.
SR 283	15.7	25.3	SR 60 northwest of Gainesville	SR 52 southeast of Clermont	—	—	
SR 284	17.0	27.4	SR 11 Bus. in Gainesville	SR 115 northwest of Clermont	—	—	
SR 285	13.9	22.4	SR 91 southwest of Donalsonville	US 84 / SR 38 in Brinson	—	—	
SR 286	10.0	16.1	US 76 / SR 52 east of Dalton	US 411 / SR 2 / SR 61 in Eton	—	—	
SR 287	—	—	Just south of Macon–Taylor county line southeast of Reynolds	SR 96 east of Reynolds	1950	1987	Route was only in Taylor County, and its removal coincided with the relocation of SR 127 and closing of the ferry over the Flint River. Both SR 127 and SR 287 followed portions of the same road (General John B. Gordon Rd).
SR 288	5.8	9.3	US 76 / SR 2 / SR 17 west of Hiawassee	US 76 / SR 2 / SR 17 / SR 75 southeast of Hiawassee	—	—	Locally known as Sunnyside Road
SR 289	—	—	US 23 / SR 19 southeast of Hazlehurst	US 341 / SR 27 in Graham	1951	1979	Route was still unpaved south of Zoar Road when turned to county.
SR 290	2.3	3.7	Railroad tracks in Hatcher	US 82 / SR 50 west-southwest of Springvale	1951	1981	
SR 291	1.4	2.3	Upper Morris Road in Morris	US 82 / SR 50 west of Springvale	1951	1981	
SR 292	30.9	49.7	SR 15 / SR 29 in Higgston	US 280 / SR 30 east of Bellville	—	—	
SR 293	29.7	47.8	US 41 / SR 3 in Emerson	US 27 / SR 1 / SR 20 in Rome	1952	current	Cobb County portion decommissioned in 1989. Portion in Bartow County from north of Acworth to Emerson decommissioned in 1997. Route was relocated and extended to Rome in 1977.
SR 294	—	—	Allatoona Dam east of Cartersville	SR 20 northeast of Cartersville	1957	1965	Formerly SR 294N; later redesignated as SR 294N
SR 294N	—	—	Allatoona Dam east of Cartersville	SR 20 northeast of Cartersville	1952	1957	Redesignated as SR 294, which was reverted to SR 294N; redesignated as SR 20 Spur
SR 294N	—	—	Allatoona Dam east of Cartersville	SR 20 northeast of Cartersville	1965	1994	Formerly SR 294; redesignated SR 20 Spur
SR 294S	—	—	SR 3 north of Emerson	Allatoona Dam east of Cartersville	1952	1977	
SR 295	—	—	US 19 / US 41 / SR 3 in Atlanta	University Avenue in Atlanta	1954	1957	
SR 295	7.4	11.9	I-75 / I-85 / SR 401 / SR 403 / Downtown Connector in Atlanta	I-75 / I-85 / SR 401 / SR 403 / Downtown Connector in Atlanta	—	—	Followed a portion of the South Expressway (current I-75)
SR 296	16.4	26.4	US 1 / US 221 / SR 4 / SR 17 north of Louisville	SR 17 northwest of Wrens	1953	current	Formerly part of SR 16 and then SR 16 Conn.
SR 297	23.8	38.3	SR 130 / SR 292 in Vidalia	US 1 / SR 4 / SR 57 southeast of Swainsboro	—	—	
SR 298	6.6	10.6	SR 46 east of Soperton	SR 297 north of Vidalia	—	—	
SR 299	3.5	5.6	SR 134 at the Tennessee state line west-northwest of Hooker	US 11 / SR 58 northeast of Wildwood	—	—	
SR 300	20.3	32.7	SR 83 northeast of Monticello	US 129 / US 441 / SR 24 north of Eatonton	1960	1983	
SR 300	107.0	172.2	US 19 / SR 57 / SR 3 at the Florida state line south-southeast of Thomasville	I-75 in Cordele	1983	current	
SR 301	10.3	16.6	SR 75 at the Alabama state line southwest of Trenton	CR 90 at the Alabama state line northwest of Trenton	—	—	
SR 302	4.6	7.4	SR 267 at the Florida state line south-southeast of Faceville	SR 97 northeast of Faceville	—	—	
SR 303	9.1	14.6	US 17 / US 82 / SR 25 / SR 520 southwest of Brunswick	US 17 / SR 25 in Country Club Estates	—	—	
SR 304	—	—	US 221 / SR 47 north of Appling	US 221 / SR 104 / SR 150 in Pollards Corner	1957	1987	Redesignated as part of SR 47 when SR 47 was relocated off of Ray Lewis Road onto parts of SR 104 and 304.
SR 305	29.2	47.0	SR 56 in Midville	SR 88 south of Keysville	—	—	
SR 306	12.90	20.76	SR 20 in Cumming	SR 53 northeast of Chestatee	1957	current	
SR 307	8.5	13.7	US 17 / SR 25 in Garden City	SR 25 in Garden City	—	—	
SR 308	11.4	18.3	US 19 / SR 3 northwest of Smithville	SR 45 in Plains	—	—	
SR 309	26.8	43.1	CR 159 at the Florida state line south-southwest of Attapulgus	SR 262 north of Climax	—	—	
SR 310	21.7	34.9	SR 253 east-northeast of Reynoldsville	US 27 / SR 1 / SR 45 Conn. in Colquitt	—	—	
SR 311	23.9	38.5	SR 97 / SR 309 in Bainbridge	SR 97 northeast of Hopeful	—	—	
SR 312	15.4	24.8	US 27 Bus. / US 84 Bus. / SR 38 in Bainbridge	US 84 / SR 38 in Whigham	1960	1980	
SR 313	22.3	35.9	US 82 / SR 520 in Sylvester	SR 300 in Warwick	—	—	
SR 314	10.8	17.4	SR 85 in Fayetteville	SR 139 in College Park	—	—	Northern end was truncated and relocated twice due to runway expansion at Hartsfield-Jackson airport.
SR 315	29.8	48.0	SR 219 in Piney Grove	SR 208 in Olive Branch	—	—	
SR 316	38.9	62.6	I-85 / SR 403 west of Lawrenceville	US 29 / US 78 / SR 8 / SR 10 Loop / SR 422 in Athens	—	—	
SR 317	7.3	11.7	SR 120 northwest of Lawrenceville	US 23 / SR 13 in Suwanee	—	—	Route created originally as a temporary end to I-85
SR 318	6.351	10.221	Dawson Forest south-southwest of Dawsonville	War Hill Park southeast of Dawsonville	1960	1985	Original segment: Dawson Forest south-southwest of Dawsonville to SR 53 southeast of Dawsonville; extended east to War Hill Park southeast of Dawsonville; truncated segments: 1971 (Dawson Forest to SR 9 south of Dawsonville), 1980 (west end of SR 53 concurrency to War Hill Park),
SR 319	—	—	SR 211 north-northwest of Statham	US 129 / SR 15 / SR 82 between Arcade and Jefferson	1960	1990	Today known as Double Bridges Road and Etheridge Road
SR 320	9.9	15.9	SR 59 southwest of Carnesville	SR 106 in Mize	—	—	
SR 321	—	—	US 280 / SR 30 / SR 63 in Pembroke	SR 119 in Ivanhoe	1960	1967	Redesignated as part of SR 119
SR 322	—	—	US 1 / SR 4 / SR 46 in Oak Park	SR 292 east of Lyons	1960	1966	Redesignated as part of SR 86
SR 323	14.1	22.7	US 129 / SR 11 southeast of Gainesville	SR 51 west-northwest of Homer	—	—	
SR 324	9.6	15.4	SR 20 in Buford	US 29 Bus. / SR 8 in Auburn	—	—	Former segment: Auburn to SR 53 southwest of Statham was decommissioned in 1993 when SR 316 opened with only the eastern portion into Statham retained as an extended SR 211
SR 325	11.1	17.9	US 76 / SR 2 / SR 515 west of Blairsville	US 19 / US 129 / SR 11 in Ivy Log	—	—	Route was decommissioned in 1988 and restored in 1989 after public outcry except for portion south of US 76/SR 515 extending to current Blue Ridge Highway (Old US 76).
SR 326	16.4	26.4	—	—	1961	current	
SR 327	9.8	15.8	US 29 / SR 8 in Franklin Springs	SR 17 northwest of Bowersville	—	—	
SR 328	9.8	15.8	SR 17 in Avalon	SR 59 in Lavonia	1963	current	Locally known as Gumlog Road. A short section in Avalon was removed south of a relocated part of GA 17 around 2019.
SR 329	9.5	15.3	SR 26 east of Montezuma	SR 230 west of Unadilla	1963	current	Former segment: SR 26 east of Montezuma to US 41 / SR 7 north-northwest of Unadilla; moved in 1970
SR 330	6.1	9.8	SR 82 north of Statham	US 129 / SR 15 Alt. in Attica	1963	current	
SR 331	3.3	5.3	SR 85 west of Forest Park	SR 54 in Lake City	1963	current	
SR 332	24.0	38.6	SR 53 in Hoschton	SR 13 in Oakwood	1963	current	A portion of SR 332 was relocated in the late 1990s when US 129 was relocated between Talmo and Pendergrass
SR 333	—	—	US 19 at the Florida state line east-southeast of Metcalfe US 41 / US 341 / SR 7 / SR 7 Conn. north of Barnesville	US 19 / US 82 / SR 50S in Albany Between Jonesboro and Hapeville	1963	1982	Redesignated as part of SR 300 / US 19 / US 82 / SR 50 / US 41 / SR 7 / SR 3 including two segments from near Riverdale to Griffin and from Albany to Thomasville. The old alignments were preserved as SR 3 necessitating a different route number, but SR 3 was moved off the old routes to replace 333.
SR 333	29.2	47.0	SR 53 at the Florida state line south-southeast of Quitman	SR 133 southeast of Berlin	1993	current	The current SR 333 was formerly part of SR 35 and then SR 33.
SR 334	12.4	20.0	US 441 / SR 15 north of Athens	US 441 Bus. / SR 98 in Commerce	1963	current	
SR 335	8.4	13.5	SR 15 Alt. / SR 82 in Jefferson	US 441 / SR 15 in Nicholson	1963	current	
SR 336	—	—	SR 328 east of Avalon	SR 17 in Toccoa	1963	1982	Locally known as Rock Creek Road, formerly Brookhaven Circle
SR 337	22.7	36.5	CR 99 at the Alabama state line southwest of Menlo	US 27 / SR 1 south of LaFayette	1963	current	The northern portion was relocated from GA 193 to US 27 along an existing industrial road and new alignment in 1988, and a portion between Menlo and Hair Lake Road was relocated in 1976.
SR 338	22.3	35.9	SR 117 in Cadwell	US 441 / SR 29 northwest of Dublin	1963	current	
SR 339	3.5	5.6	SR 66 northwest of Young Harris	SR 17 / SR 515 north of Young Harris	1963	current	Locally known as Crooked Creek Road
SR 340	—	—	US 78 / US 278 / SR 8 in Austell	SR 3 in Fair Oaks	1963	1983	Replaced with part of a relocated SR 5 in 1983. SR 5 had previously followed parallel Powder Springs Road.
SR 341	15.5	24.9	SR 193 in Davis Crossroads	SR 193 in Chattanooga Valley	1963	current	A small portion was truncated and relocated north of Old Chattanooga Valley Road in 1986 when SR 193 was relocated.
SR 342	5.240	8.433	SR 183 southeast of Juno	SR 52 southeast of Amicalola	1963	1982	Route is today Bailey/Waters Road north of SR 136 and Keith Evans Road south of SR 136.
SR 343	—	—	US 23 / US 441 / SR 15 in Tallulah Falls	US 23 / US 441 / SR 15 in Wiley	1963	1965	Followed a portion of relocated US 23/US 441 from Tallulah Falls to Wylie. Decommissioned when SR 15 was relocated onto the new route of U.S. 23/441. Wylie Connector formed the northern end of SR 343 and is the only portion that is not part of U.S. 23/441 and is maintained by Rabun County.
SR 344	—	—	US 27 / US 411 / SR 1 in Rome	US 41 / US 411 / SR 3 in Cartersville	1963	1977	Completely concurrent with US 411; redesignated as part of SR 20
SR 345	—	—	SR 20 west of Coosa	SR 114	1962	1962	Existed from September to December 1962, when it became part of SR 100; not on GDOT 1963 map due to short life
SR 346	—	—	US 129 / SR 11 in Talmo	SR 82 northeast of Talmo	1963	2004	Locally known as Pond Fork Church Road. Functional classification was downgraded to remove federal-aid eligibility around 2015.
SR 347	12.3	19.8	Lanier Islands Parkway north of Buford	SR 211 in Braselton	1963	current	Route originally only included the portion west of I-985. Route was substantially relocated west of I-985, and route was extended east to SR 211 in 1997. Subsequent relocations on the extended portion to widen the road today has very little of the route following the original alignment both along both the older and newer portions.
SR 348	13.4	21.6	SR 75 Alt. west-southwest of Helen	SR 180 in Choestoe	1966	current	When it was commissioned, it was in two segments: SR 356 west-southwest of Helen to the White–Union county line and one southeast of Choestoe. Its entire length is part of the Russell–Brasstown Scenic Byway. It follows the historic Logan Turnpike from SR 180 to Tesnatee Gap.
SR 349	—	—	SR 193 in Flintstone	US 27 / SR 1 in Rossville	1963	1986	Was removed as a route when Battlefield Parkway was completed to SR 189 in Flintstone in August 1986. Route is locally known as Happy Valley Road and James Avenue in Rossville.
SR 350	—	—	US 29 / US 78 / SR 8 / SR 8 Bus. / SR 10 in Athens	US 29 / SR 8 in Athens	1963	1966	Route followed a portion of what is today the Athens Perimeter SR 10 Loop from US 129 to US 29. Route was re-designated as part of SR 8 when the route was extended west to meet U.S. 29 on both ends. It was re-designated as S.R. 10 Loop in 1988.
SR 351	13	21	SR 138 in Jonesboro	US 23 / SR 42 east-northeast of Flippen	1963	1985	
SR 352	9.8	15.8	SR 41 north-northwest of Buena Vista	SR 355 south-southwest of Juniper	1963	current	
SR 353	—	—	SR 135 in Douglas	SR 206 north-northeast of Wray	1965	1988	Redesignated as part of SR 206
SR 354	6.9	11.1	SR 116 in Pine Mountain Valley	SR 18 west of Pine Mountain	1963	current	The portion from SR 18 to U.S. 27 is a truck by-pass for SR 18.
SR 355	19.9	32.0	SR 26 northwest of Glen Alta	US 80 / SR 22 north of Juniper	1963	current	The southern portion of SR 355 follows part of Old SR 103 that was partially closed in 1963 for Fort Benning. A small portion was relocated in 2008 for a bridge replacement leaving an old alignment to the old bridge.
SR 356	10.8	17.4	SR 17 / SR 75 in Robertstown	SR 197 northeast of Batesville	1966	current	SR 356 was shortened in 1982 when the western portion from SR 17/SR 75 to US 129 was re-designated as SR 75 ALT.
SR 357	15.5	24.9	SR 85 at a gate to Fort Benning in Columbus	US 27 Alt. / SR 85 in Columbus	1965	1982	Formerly part of SR 103 and SR 1 Spur
SR 358	6.4	10.3	SR 96 south-southwest of Jeffersonville	US 80 / SR 19 west of Danville	1966	current	
SR 359	—	—	North of Hunter Air Force Base south of Savannah	US 17 / US 80 / SR 25 / SR 26S in Savannah	1965	1968	Redesignated as part of SR 204 when Abercorn Expressway was built, connecting the route to I-95.
SR 360	15.5	24.9	US 278 / SR 6 / SR 120 in Hiram	SR 5 / SR 120 in Marietta	1966	current	Western end of the route from SR 120 to U.S. 278 (current S.R. 6 Business) was decommissioned in 1982. SR 360 was extended east along Powder Springs Road to what is now SR 120 in 1983 when SR 5 was relocated to Austell Road in 1983.
SR 361	21	34	US 41 / US 129 / SR 49 / SR 247 south of Macon	US 23 / SR 87 east-southeast of Bolingbroke	1967	1982	Route had many turns and name changes following portions of Bass Road, Foster Road, Tucker Road, Fulton Mill Road, Hartley Bridge Road, Houston Road (Old SR 11), and Allen Road
SR 362	32.5	52.3	US 27 Alt. / SR 41 north of Greenville	US 19 Bus. / US 41 Bus. / SR 155 in Griffin	1966	current	
SR 363	19	31	US 84 / SR 38 in Saffold	SR 39 in Blakely	1967	1985	Partially redesignated as SR 370
SR 364	—	—	US 84 / SR 38 west of Boston	US 84 / SR 38 west of Quitman	1966	1982	Formerly part of US 84 / SR 38
SR 365	69.5	111.8	I-85 / I-985 / SR 403 / SR 419 in Suwanee	US 123 at the South Carolina state line northeast of Toccoa	1969	current	The portion of SR 365 following US 123 from SR 184 to the South Carolina line was originally part of SR 13 until 1991.
SR 366	10	16	SR 51 / SR 77 west of Hartwell	I-85 / SR 403 northeast of Lavonia	1967	1990	Redesignated as part of SR 77
SR 367	—	—	US 80 / SR 26 in Whitemarsh Island	US 80 / SR 26 in Wilmington Island	1969	1985	Originally part of U.S. 80. Designated SR 26 Loop prior to renumbering to 367.
SR 368	10.6	17.1	SR 77 north of Elberton	SC 184 at the South Carolina state line northeast of Elberton	1970	current	Formerly SR 82 on an alignment slightly farther to the east than current one; moved in 1943; redesignated as SR 368 in 1970
SR 369	36.223	58.295	SR 20 east of Canton	I-985 / US 23 / SR 365 / SR 419 in Gainesville	1970	current	Portion from SR 13 in Gainesville to Old Federal Road in Forsyth County was originally a section of SR 141.
SR 370	12.6	20.3	US 84 / SR 38 northwest of Jakin	SR 62 in Hilton	1970	current	
SR 371	6.0	9.7	SR 9 northeast of Milton	SR 20 east of Free Home	1971	2020	Route was replaced with an extended SR 141 on Bethelview Road. It was historically SR 141 from 1944-1971.
SR 372	27.128	43.658	SR 140 in Alpharetta	I-575 / SR 5 / SR 5 Bus. / SR 515 west of Nelson	1972	current	
SR 373	—	—	SR 156 in Calhoun	SR 53 in Sonoraville	1972	1977	Followed parts of Cash Road, Dews Pond Road, and Barrett Road
SR 374	7.9	12.7	SR 253 southwest of Reynoldsville	SR 39 south of Donalsonville	1972	current	Southern portion south of GA 253 was decommissioned in 1997.
SR 375	—	—	SR 27 in Georgetown	US 27 / SR 1 south-southwest of Louvale	1972	1972	Redesignated as SR 39; not on GDOT 1973 map due to short life
SR 376	16.0	25.7	SR 31 in Clyattville	SR 135 west of Statenville	1972	current	
SR 377	20.0	32.2	SR 195 northeast of Leesburg	US 280 / SR 27 / SR 30 / SR 49 in Americus	1974	current	
SR 378	6.4	10.3	US 23 / SR 13 in Norcross	US 29 / SR 8 in Lilburn	1974	current	
SR 379	13.5	21.7	SR 53 south-southwest of Ludville	SR 108 north-northeast of Sharp Top	1977	1981	Locally known as Henderson Mountain Road; Route followed a portion of former SR 143. Most of the route was projected mileage with only the portion from Jerusalem Church Road to SR 53 west of Ludville state controlled. The original unpaved portion of SR 143 extending east to SR 108 had been transferred to county maintenance in 1972 and only remained as projected mileage that was never built.
SR 380	5.8	9.3	SR 83 southwest of Monticello	SR 16 east of Monticello	1986	current	Formerly SR 83 Conn.
SR 381	—	—	US 278 / SR 6 in Dallas	SR 92 in Cross Roads	1979	1990	Currently known as Dallas-Acworth Highway. Route was formerly part of SR 92 and SR 92 Spur
SR 382	11.6	18.7	SR 136 northwest of Talking Rock	SR 5 / SR 515 south-southwest of Ellijay	1980	current	Route was first created in May 1980 in a mileage swap with SR 108 where it followed Burnt Mountain Road. Route was extended along a portion of Old SR 5 from 1984-2021 when SR 5 was relocated. In 2021, SR 382 was relocated to directly connect to SR 515 with the former portion along Old SR 5 turned to the county.
SR 383	7.4	11.9	US 78 / US 278 / SR 10 in Augusta	SR 104 in Evans	1987	current	
SR 384	15.6	25.1	US 23 / SR 365 in Baldwin	SR 75 southeast of Helen	1988	current	
SR 385	11.5	18.5	US 23 / US 441 / US 441 Bus. / SR 15 / SR 105 / SR 365 in Cornelia	US 23 / US 441 / SR 15 / SR 17 Alt. in Hollywood	1992	current	Route is a state reference route for U.S. 441 Business from Cornelia to Hollywood and follows what was previously parts of SR 15, 17, and 115.
SR 387	2.9	4.7	I-285 / SR 407 in East Point	I-85 / SR 403 in College Park	1990	1991	Followed a portion of Camp Creek Parkway, now part of SR 6, from I-285 to I-85.
SR 388	4.5	7.2	SR 223 in Grovetown	SR 232 in Lewiston	1991	current	Also extended along Harlem-Grovetown Road from 2004 to 2007
SR 400	53.7	86.4	I-85 / SR 403 in Atlanta	US 19 / SR 60 / SR 115 south-southeast of Dahlonega	1971	current	An unbuilt portion south of I-85 to what is now Freedom Parkway was originally planned to be part of I-485
SR 401	355.11	571.49	I-75 / SR 93 at the Florida state line south-southeast of Lake Park	I-75 at the Tennessee state line at East Ridge	1963	current	Unsigned designation for I-75
SR 402	202.61	326.07	I-20 at the Alabama state line southwest of Tallapoosa	I-20 at the South Carolina state line at Augusta	—	—	Unsigned designation for I-20
SR 403	179.9	289.5	I-85 at the Alabama state line at Lanett	I-85 at the South Carolina state line east-southeast of Gumlog	—	—	Unsigned designation for I-85
SR 404	166.81	268.45	I-16 / I-75 / SR 401 in Macon	I-16 and Montgomery Street in Savannah	—	—	Unsigned designation for I-16
SR 405	112.03	180.29	I-95 / SR 9 at the Florida state line south of Kingsland	I-95 at the South Carolina state line north-northeast of Port Wentworth	—	—	Unsigned designation for I-95
SR 406	19.5	31.4	I-59 at the Alabama state line south-southwest of Rising Fawn	I-24 / I-59 / SR 409 west-northwest of Wildwood	—	—	Unsigned designation for I-59
SR 407	63.98	102.97	Beltway around Atlanta		—	—	Unsigned designation for I-285
SR 408	15.83	25.48	I-75 / I-475 / SR 401 south-southwest of Macon	I-75 / I-475 / SR 401 northwest of Bolingbroke	—	—	Unsigned designation for I-475
SR 409	4.13	6.65	I-24 at the Tennessee state line west-northwest of Wildwood	I-24 at the Tennessee state line at Chattanooga	—	—	Unsigned designation for I-24
SR 410	6.8	10.9	US 29 / US 78 / SR 8 / Stone Mountain Freeway on the Scottdale–North Decatur line	US 78 / SR 10 / Stone Mountain Freeway north of Stone Mountain	—	—	State highway designation for the Stone Mountain Freeway; entirely concurrent with US 78
SR 411	49.30	79.34	I-185 and Lindsey Creek Parkway in Fort Benning in Columbus	I-85 / I-185 / SR 403 east of LaGrange	1979	current	Unsigned designation for I-185
SR 412	—	—	Albany	I-75 / I-175 / SR 401 near Cordele	—	—	Unsigned designation for what would have become I-175, had it actually been built
SR 413	11.04	17.77	I-75 / I-675 / SR 401 in Stockbridge	I-285 / I-675 / SR 407 south-southeast of Atlanta	—	—	Unsigned designation for I-675
SR 414	5.40	8.69	I-285 / I-420 / SR 407 in Atlanta	I-420 / I-675 / SR 413 in Atlanta	—	—	Unsigned designation for what would have become I-420, had it actually been built
SR 415	15.62	25.14	I-20 / I-520 / SR 232 / SR 402 in Augusta	I-520 at the South Carolina state line on the Augusta–North Augusta line	1980	current	Unsigned designation for I-520
SR 416	—	—	—	—	—	—	
SR 417	30.97	49.84	I-75 / I-575 / SR 5 / SR 401 southeast of Kennesaw	I-575 / SR 5 / SR 5 Bus. / SR 372 / SR 515 west of Nelson	—	—	Unsigned designation for I-575
SR 419	25.01	40.25	I-85 / I-985 / SR 365 / SR 403 in Suwanee	I-985 / US 23 / SR 365 in Gainesville	—	—	Unsigned designation for I-985; completely concurrent with SR 365
SR 421	6.49	10.44	I-516 / SR 21 in Garden City	I-516 / SR 21 in Savannah	—	—	Unsigned designation for I-516; completely concurrent with SR 21
SR 422	19.1	30.7	Beltway around Athens		—	—	Unsigned designation for SR 10 Loop
SR 500	55	89	I-75 / SR 401 north-northeast of Cartersville	I-85 / SR 20 / SR 403 south of Buford	proposed	—	Official state highway designation for the Outer Perimeter, also known as the Northern Arc.
SR 515	76.2	122.6	I-575 / SR 5 / SR 5 Bus. / SR 372 / SR 417 west of Nelson	SR 17 / NC 69 at the North Carolina state line south of Hayesville	1989	current	Part of Corridor A
SR 520	261.0	420.0	US 280 / SR 38 at the Alabama state line on the Phenix City–Columbus line	Beach View Drive in Jekyll Island	1988	current	State highway designation for the South Georgia Parkway
SR 540	215	346	US 80 / SR 8 / SR 22 at the Alabama state line on the Phenix City, Alabama–Columbus city line	I-520 / US 1 / SR 4 / SR 415 in Augusta	2018	current	State highway designation for the Fall Line Freeway (FLF-540)
SR 555	156	251	I-16 / US 25 / US 301 / SR 73 / SR 404 south-southwest of Statesboro	US 1 / US 25 / US 78 / US 278 / SR 10 / SR 121 in Augusta	—	—	Unsigned state highway designation for Savannah River Parkway's western section: south of Statesboro to Augusta (EDS-555)
SR 565	156	251	Downtown Savannah	US 1 / US 25 / US 78 / US 278 / SR 10 / SR 121 in Augusta	—	—	Unsigned state highway designation for Savannah River Parkway's eastern section: Savannah to Augusta (EDS-565)
SR 701	—	—	West of LaGrange	SR 109 south-southeast of Glenn	1973	1975	Redesignated as part of SR 109
SR 702	—	—	—	—	—	—	
SR 703	—	—	—	—	—	—	
SR 704	—	—	SR 30 west-northwest of Monteith	SR 21 north-northwest of Monteith	proposed	—	Built as a northern rerouting of SR 30
SR 705	—	—	I-75 / SR 401 in Marietta	Owenby Drive in Marietta	1972	1976	Redesignated as SR 5 Conn.
SR 706	—	—	North-northwest of Ambrose	Broxton	—	—	
SR 707	—	—	US 17 / US 82 / SR 25 / SR 38 in Midway	SR 38 east-southeast of Midway	1975	1979	Built as a southern rerouting of SR 38, with US 82 extended onto it
SR 708	—	—	US 17 / US 82 / SR 25 / SR 38 in Midway	SR 38 east-southeast of Midway	1975	1977	Redesignated as part of SR 136
SR 711	—	—	—	—	1977	1978	
SR 713	—	—	I-75 / I-575 / SR 401 west of Kennesaw	I-575 / SR 5 west of Nelson	1978	1985	Redesignated as a western rerouting of SR 5 on I-575
SR 714	—	—	SR 122 west-southwest of Waycross	US 1 / US 23 / SR 4 southeast of Waycross	proposed	—	Its path was replaced by a relocated US 82 / SR 50.
SR 715	—	—	—	—	1980	1987	
SR 716	—	—	—	—	—	—	
SR 719	—	—	SR 5 south-southwest of Ellijay	US 76 / SR 5 northeast of Ellijay	proposed	—	Built as an eastern rerouting of SR 5
SR 720	—	—	—	—	—	—	
SR 721	—	—	US 19 Bus. / US 41 Bus. / SR 3 / SR 16 in Griffin High Falls Road east of Griffin	Memorial Drive in Griffin SR 16 west-southwest of Jackson	1979	1983	Redesignated as part of SR 16
SR 722	—	—	—	—	—	—	
SR 724	—	—	—	—	—	—	
SR 725	—	—	—	—	—	—	
SR 726	—	—	US 278 / SR 6 west-northwest of Powder Springs	US 278 / SR 6 / SR 6 Bus. in Powder Springs	1990	1991	Originally proposed as a western bypass of Powder Springs, Clarkdale, and Austell and replaced by US 278 / SR 6; the second iteration was also replaced by US 278 / SR 6.
SR 727	—	—	—	—	—	—	
SR 728	—	—	US 280 / SR 30 south-southwest of McRae	US 319 / US 441 / SR 31 northeast of Helena	proposed	—	Could still be proposed
SR 729	—	—	—	—	—	—	
SR 730	—	—	US 27 / SR 1 southeast of LaFayette	US 27 / SR 1 north-northeast of LaFayette	1983	1988	Built as an eastern rerouting of US 27 / SR 1
SR 731	—	—	—	—	—	—	
SR 732	—	—	US 29 / US 78 / SR 8 / SR 10 in Athens	US 129 / US 441 / SR 15 in Athens	proposed	—	Proposed designated for southwestern completion of Athens Perimeter Highway; was built, but designated as SR 10
SR 733	—	—	US 76 / SR 5 northeast of Ellijay	US 76 / SR 5 northeast of Ellijay	proposed	—	Built as an eastern rerouting of US 76 / SR 5 / SR 515
SR 734	—	—	US 76 / SR 5 south-southwest of Cherry Log	US 76 / SR 5 in Lucius	proposed	—	Built as a rerouting of US 76 / SR 5 / SR 515
SR 736	—	—	John C. Calhoun Expressway / 15th Street in Augusta	Greene Street / SR 4 in Augusta	proposed	—	Built as a southern rerouting of SR 28
SR 739	—	—	—	—	—	—	Built as rerouting of SR 31 in Dublin
SR 740	—	—	—	—	—	—	
SR 741	—	—	SR 22 southwest of Crawfordville	SR 22 northwest of Crawfordville	proposed	—	Built as a western rerouting of SR 22
SR 744	—	—	US 27 / SR 1 / SR 100 south-southwest of Cedartown	US 27 / SR 1 north-northeast of Cedartown	proposed	—	Built as an eastern rerouting of US 27 / SR 1
SR 745	—	—	—	—	—	—	
SR 746	—	—	US 411 / SR 20 southeast of Rome	SR 293 east of Rome	1990	1992	Also proposed northwest, around northeastern part of Rome, and around southern and western parts of the city
SR 747	—	—	US 27 Alt. / SR 16 north of Newnan	US 29 / SR 14 north of Newnan	1988	1989	Proposed as a northern bypass of Newnan; later proposed as SR 34 Byp.; later re-proposed as SR 747; part of it completed as SR 747
SR 748	—	—	SR 113 east-northeast of Rockmart	US 278 / SR 6 east-southeast of Van Wert	proposed	—	Built as part of an eastern rerouting of US 278 / SR 6
SR 750	—	—	—	—	—	—	
SR 754	—	—	SR 5 Spur in Marietta	I-575 / SR 5 / SR 417 in Holly Springs	1985	2003	Formerly part of SR 5
SR 755	—	—	—	—	—	—	
SR 758	—	—	US 41 Bus. / US 80 / US 129 / SR 11 / SR 22 / SR 49 in Macon	US 23 / US 80 / US 129 Alt. / SR 19 / SR 87 in Macon	proposed	—	Mostly canceled proposal
SR 759	—	—	US 441 / SR 15 south-southeast of Commerce	US 441 / SR 15 north-northeast of Commerce	1991	1992	Redesignated as an eastern rerouting of US 441 / SR 15
SR 765	—	—	US 441 / SR 15 / SR 164 south-southeast of Homer	US 441 / SR 15 north-northeast of Homer	proposed	—	Built as an eastern rerouting of US 441 / SR 15
SR 768	—	—	US 278 / SR 6 west-southwest of Dallas	US 278 / SR 6 / SR 120 southeast of Dallas	proposed	—	Replaced the proposed path of SR 6 Byp.; built as a southern re-routing of US 278 / SR 6 / SR 120
SR 771	—	—	SR 5 south of McCaysville	Tennessee state line north-northwest of McCaysville	proposed	—	Shows on 1996 county map as constructed, but never physically existed
SR 773	—	—	US 23 / US 441 / SR 15 south of Tallulah Falls	US 23 / US 441 / SR 15 in Tallulah Falls	proposed	—	Built as a western rerouting of US 23 / US 441 / SR 15
SR 776	—	—	—	—	—	—	
SR 780	—	—	—	—	—	—	
SR 782	—	—	—	—	—	—	
SR 789	—	—	US 278 / SR 6 north-northeast of Yorkville	US 278 / SR 6 east of Yorkville	proposed	—	Built as a northeastern rerouting of US 278 / SR 6
SR 791	—	—	—	—	—	—	
SR 793	—	—	US 27 / SR 1 south-southwest of Bremen	US 27 / SR 1 north-northwest of Bremen	proposed	—	Built as a western rerouting of US 27 / SR 1
SR 811	—	—	US 27 / SR 1 south-southeast of Buchanan	US 27 / SR 1 north-northwest of Buchanan	proposed	—	Built as a rerouting of US 27 / SR 1
SR 813	—	—	US 27 / SR 1 east-northeast of Chickamauga	SR 2 west-southwest of Fort Oglethorpe	proposed	—	Built as a western rerouting of US 27 / SR 1
SR 814	—	—	—	—	—	—	
SR 816	—	—	SR 24 west of Sandersville	SR 88 east-northeast of Sandersville	proposed	—	Built as a western extension of SR 88
SR 817	—	—	US 29 / SR 8 / SR 316 west-southwest of Dacula	US 78 / SR 10 Loop in Athens	proposed	—	Built as an eastern extension of SR 316
SR 818	—	—	US 129 / US 441 / SR 24 north-northeast of Bishop	US 129 / US 441 / SR 15 in Athens	proposed	—	Previously proposed as a northern extension of SR 186; built as a western rerouting of US 129 / US 441 / SR 24 and SR 15
SR 819	—	—	—	—	—	—	
SR 822	—	—	Downtown Dublin	US 80 / US 319 / SR 26 / SR 29 / SR 31 in Dublin	1989	1992	
SR 824	—	—	—	—	—	—	
SR 825	—	—	—	—	—	—	
SR 826	—	—	US 129 / SR 44 in Warfield	US 129 / US 441 / SR 24 north of Eatonton	proposed	—	Built as a western rerouting of US 129 / US 441 / SR 24
SR 828	—	—	SR 21 east of Millen	US 25 / SR 121 north-northwest of Millen	proposed	—	Built as a northern rerouting of SR 21
SR 829	—	—	US 301 / SR 73 / SR 73 Loop south-southwest of Sylvania	SR 21 southeast of Sylvania	1990	1993	Redesignated as part of SR 21
SR 830	—	—	—	—	—	—	
SR 831	—	—	US 27 / SR 1 east-southeast of Attapulgus	US 27 / SR 1 north-northwest of Attapulgus	proposed	—	Built as an eastern rerouting of US 27 / SR 1
SR 835	—	—	SR 17 south of Hollywood	US 23 / US 441 / SR 15 south-southwest of Tallulah Falls	proposed	—	Built as an eastward rerouting of US 23 / US 441 / SR 15
SR 837	—	—	—	—	—	—	
SR 838	—	—	US 27 / SR 1 south-southeast of Blakely	US 27 / SR 1 north-northeast of Blakely	proposed	—	Built as an eastern rerouting of US 27 / SR 1
SR 841	—	—	—	—	—	—	
SR 844	—	—	US 319 / US 441 / SR 31 south of Dublin	US 441 / SR 29 north-northwest of Dublin	proposed	—	Proposed as a western bypass of Dublin, but was later canceled.
SR 847	—	—	US 27 / SR 1 south-southwest of Cuthbert	US 27 / SR 1 north-northeast of Cuthbert	proposed	—	Built as an eastern rerouting of US 27 / SR 1
SR 863	—	—	SR 21 south-southeast of Springfield	SR 21 northwest of Springfield	proposed	—	Built as a western rerouting of SR 21
SR 864	—	—	—	—	—	—	
SR 866	—	—	—	—	—	—	
SR 868	—	—	—	—	—	—	
SR 876	—	—	US 441 / SR 15 south-southeast of Hollingsworth	SR 198 southeast of Hollingsworth	proposed	—	Built as an eastern rerouting of US 441 / SR 15
SR 877	—	—	Hollingsworth	US 441 / SR 15 north-northwest of Hollingsworth	proposed	—	Canceled proposal
SR 889	1.3	2.1	SR 369 / SR 60 west of Gainesville	SR 53	1993	1997	SR 889 was concurrent with SR 53 Conn.
SR 894	—	—	—	—	—	—	
SR 896	—	—	US 82 / SR 50 east-southeast of Waresboro	US 1 / US 23 / SR 4 north-northeast of Waresboro	proposed	—	Its path was replaced by a relocated US 1 / US 23 / SR 4.
SR 899	—	—	US 129 / SR 11 / SR 18 / SR 22 southwest of Clinton	SR 22 east-northeast of Gray	proposed	—	
SR 900	—	—	—	—	—	—	
SR 901	—	—	US 129 / US 441 / SR 15 in Athens	Timothy Road in Athens	proposed	—	Built as a western rerouting of US 23 / US 441 / SR 15
SR 915	—	—	—	—	—	—	
SR 920	17.2	27.7	SR 54 east of Fayetteville	US 23/SR 20/SR 42/SR 81 in McDonough	1994	2023	Planned realignment of SR 81
SR 932	—	—	US 129 / SR 11 / SR 18 / SR 22 in Gray	SR 22 east-northeast of Gray	proposed	—	Eastern terminus was truncated to SR 18 in the southeastern part of Gray
SR 939	—	—	—	—	—	—	
SR 962	—	—	—	—	—	2015	Appalachian Parkway, Cleveland
SR 1011	—	—	SR 28 west-northwest of Martinez	Blackstone Camp Road west-northwest of Martinez	proposed	—	Canceled proposal
SR 1017	—	—	—	—	—	—	
SR 1025	—	—	—	—	—	2015	SR 20 Cartersville Bypass
SR 1044	—	—	—	—	—	—	
SR 1053	—	—	—	—	—	—	
SR 1056	—	—	Executive Center Drive in Martinez	SR 104 in Martinez	2008	2012	Davis Road; southern terminus may have been at King Road.
SR 1077	—	—	—	—	—	—	
SR 1082	—	—	Old Evans Road in Martinez	Baston Road in Martinez	2008	2012	Additionally had three proposed segments: SR 104 in Evans to Rountree Way in Martinez; Rountree Way in Evans to Columbia Industrial Boulevard in Martinez; and Blue Ridge Drive to Old Evans Road (both in Martinez)
SR 1085	—	—	—	—	—	2015	SR 540 through Milledgeville
SR 1109	—	—	SR 21 north-northwest of Springfield	SR 119 in Springfield	proposed	—	Canceled proposal
SR 1129	—	—	—	—	—	—	
SR 1181	—	—	—	—	—	—	
SR 1191	—	—	—	—	—	—	
SR 1221	3.7	6.0	—	—	—	—	US 221/US 441 Pearson Bypass
SR 1223	—	—	—	—	—	—	
SR 1251	2.73	4.39	—	—	—	—	SR 17 Bloomingdale bypass
Former; Proposed and unbuilt
