= List of former state routes in Georgia (700–1109) =

- Standard state highway markers
- State: Georgia State Route XX (SR XX)

System links
- Georgia State Highway System; Interstate; US; State; Special

This is a list of former state routes in the U.S. state of Georgia. This list represents routes that traveled through the state but are no longer in operation, have been decommissioned, or have been renumbered.

== State Route 701 ==
State Route 701
- Location: Troup County
- Existed: 1973–1975

State Route 701 (SR 701) was a short-lived state highway that existed in the west-central part of the state. It was entirely in Troup County. In 1970, it was indicated to be "projected mileage" from a point west of LaGrange to SR 109 south-southeast of Glenn. In 1973, the entire length of the highway was hard surfaced. In 1975, SR 109 was shifted southwestward, replacing all of SR 701.

=== State Route 701 Spur ===
State Route 701 Spur
- Location: Troup County
- Existed: 1973–1975

State Route 701 Spur (SR 701 Spur) was a short-lived spur route of SR 701 that existed in the west-central part of the state. It was entirely in Troup County. In 1970, it was indicated to be "projected mileage" from the Alabama state line west of Abbottsford to SR 701 in that community. In 1973, the entire length of the highway was hard surfaced. In 1975, it was redesignated as SR 109 Spur.

== State Route 704 ==
State Route 704
- Location: Chatham County

State Route 704 (SR 704) was a proposed state highway that was planned for the northern part of Chatham County. In 1973, it was proposed from SR 30 west-northwest of Monteith to SR 21 north-northwest of that community. Between January 1979 and March 1980, the path of SR 30 in the Monteith area was shifted northward, replacing the proposed path of SR 704.

Browse numbered routes
← SR 703	GA	→ SR 705

== State Route 705 ==
State Route 705
- Location: Marietta
- Existed: 1972–1976

State Route 705 (SR 705) was a state highway that existed in the north-central part of Cobb County. It was proposed between 1961 and 1966 from SR 5 southwest of Marietta to SR 5 in southern Cherokee County. By 1973, the interchange with I-75 and a short piece of SR 705 northeast of it were built. In 1976, SR 705 between I-75 and the northern intersection with SR 5 was built and redesignated as SR 5 Conn. In 1984, SR 5 Conn. was redesignated as SR 5 Spur. SR 5's path north of Marietta was shifted westward, onto Interstate 75 (I-75) and I-575, replacing all of the proposed portion of SR 705.

The entire route was in Marietta, Cobb County.

mi	km	Destinations	Notes
		I-75 (SR 401)	Southern terminus; I-75 exit 114
		Owenby Drive	Northern terminus
1.000 mi = 1.609 km; 1.000 km = 0.621 mi

== State Route 706 ==
State Route 706
- Location: East of Ashton-Broxton

State Route 706 (SR 706) was a state route that traveled between SR 206 east of Ashton and US 441 in Broxton. Street names included the Broxton Highway, Ashton School Road and Fitzgerald Highway.

Browse numbered routes
← SR 705	GA	→ SR 707

== State Route 707 ==
State Route 707
- Location: Midway

State Route 707 (SR 707) was a proposed state highway that was planned for the southeastern part of Midway. In 1974, it was proposed from US 17/SR 25 and SR 38 at the eastern terminus of US 82 to SR 38 east-southeast of Midway. Between January 1979 and March 1980, the path of SR 38 east of Midway was shifted southward, replacing the proposed path of SR 707. US 82 was extended along this path.

== State Route 713 ==
State Route 713
- Location: Cobb, Cherokee, and Pickens counties
- Existed: 1977–1985

State Route 713 (SR 713) was a state highway. In 1977, I-575/SR 713 was proposed from I-75 north of Marietta to just south of the Cherokee–Pickens county line. It was completed from SR 140 south of Canton to SR 20 east of the city. The next year, the entire Cobb County portion (except for the southern end) of I-575/SR 713 was under construction. By March 1980, I-575/SR 713 was completed to SR 92 southwest of Woodstock and one exit to the south in the Canton area. SR 713 was proposed to be extended northwest to SR 5 in Talking Rock. SR 713 Spur was proposed from SR 5 to SR 713 at the northern terminus of I-575. Later that year, the southern completed part of I-575/SR 713 was extended south to I-75. The next year, SR 5's path from south of Nelson to southeast of Talking Rock was shifted westward, replacing the northern extension of SR 713. In 1982, I-575/SR 713 was under construction from SR 92 southwest of Woodstock to south of Canton and from east of Canton to I-575's northern terminus north-northwest of Ball Ground. SR 713 was proposed to be extended northwest to SR 5 west-northwest of Talking Rock and north to the southern terminus of SR 719 at SR 5. The next year, I-575/SR 713 was completed from SR 92 southwest of Woodstock to south of Canton. In 1985, I-575 was completed northeast to a point southwest of Ball Ground. SR 5's path from Talking Rock to south-southwest of Ellijay was shifted westward, replacing all of SR 713.

=== State Route 713 Spur ===
State Route 713 Spur
- Location: Cherokee and Pickens counties

State Route 713 Spur (SR 713 Spur) was a proposed spur route of SR 713. Between the beginning of 1979 and March 1980, it was proposed from SR 5 to SR 713 at the northern terminus of Interstate 575 (I-575). In 1981, SR 5's path from south of Nelson to southeast of Talking Rock was shifted westward, replacing SR 713 Spur.

== State Route 714 ==
State Route 714
- Location: Ware County

State Route 714 (SR 714) was a proposed state highway. Its entire planned length was entirely within the west-central part of Ware County. In 1978, a southern bypass of the main part of Waycross, designated as SR 714, was proposed from SR 122 west-southwest of the city to US 1/US 23/SR 4 southeast of it. In 1982, a proposal to extend SR 714 was shown to have extended from just south of SR 122 north-northwest to US 82/SR 50 east-southeast of Waresboro (meeting the bypass road for the northwestern part of Waycross), and then west-northwest to another meeting point with US 82/SR 50 on the western edge of Waresboro. Between January 1984 and January 1986, the path of US 82 and SR 50 was shifted onto the path of SR 714, thus replacing it.

== State Route 719 ==
State Route 719
- Location: Gilmer County

State Route 719 (SR 719) was a proposed state highway. Between the beginning of 1979 and March 1980, it was proposed from SR 5 south-southwest of Ellijay to US 76/SR 5 northeast of that city. In 1981, SR 719 was under construction. In 1983, SR 5 in Gilmer County was shifted eastward, replacing the proposed path of SR 719.

== State Route 721 ==
State Route 721
- Location: Spalding and Butts counties
- Existed: 1979–1983

State Route 721 (SR 721) was a short-lived state highway that existed in portions of Spalding and Butts counties. At least as early as 1919, SR 7 was established on essentially the same path as SR 721 would eventually travel. Between the end of September 1921 and October 1926, US 41 was designated on this path. Between the beginning of 1959 and the beginning of 1964, US 41 and SR 7 were shifted onto the new western bypass of the city, and off of this path. Between the beginning of 1974 and the beginning of 1980, SR 721 was designated on two segments: the former path of US 41/SR 7 in Griffin and from High Falls Road east of the city to SR 16 west-southwest of Jackson. This last intersection was just to the east of the Spalding–Butts county line. It was proposed between the two segments. In 1983, the path of SR 16 east of Griffin was shifted southward, replacing SR 721.

County	Location	mi	km	Destinations	Notes
Spalding	Griffin			US 19 Bus. / US 41 Bus. / SR 3 / SR 16	Western terminus
Spalding	Griffin			Memorial Drive south	
Spalding	Gap in route				
Spalding				High Falls Road	
Butts				SR 16	Eastern terminus
1.000 mi = 1.609 km; 1.000 km = 0.621 mi

== State Route 726 ==
State Route 726
- Location: Powder Springs
- Existed: 1990–1991

State Route 726 (SR 726) was a state highway In 1983, it was proposed as a western bypass of Powder Springs, Clarkdale, and Austell, from an unnumbered road south-southwest of Powder Springs to US 78/SR 5/SR 8 southwest of Austell. In 1986, US 278/SR 6 in the Powder Springs–Austell area was shifted westward, onto the path of SR 726 and the northern part of the unnumbered road in Powder Springs. The former path from Powder Springs to Austell was redesignated as SR 6 Bus. In 1988, a proposed northern rerouting of US 278/SR 6 was designated as a second iteration of SR 726. In 1990, SR 726 was completed. The next year, the path of US 278/SR 6 in the Powder Springs area was shifted northward, onto the former path of SR 726.

This table shows the completed section of SR 726. The entire route was in Cobb County.

Location	mi	km	Destinations	Notes
			US 278 / SR 6	Western terminus
Powder Springs			US 278 / SR 6 / SR 6 Bus. east	Eastern terminus of SR 726; western terminus of SR 6 Bus.
1.000 mi = 1.609 km; 1.000 km = 0.621 mi

== State Route 728 ==
State Route 728
- Location: McRae

State Route 728 (SR 728) was a proposed state highway that was planned for the eastern part of the McRae area. In 1994, it was proposed as an eastern bypass of McRae, from US 280/SR 30 south-southwest of the city, around to US 319/US 441/SR 31, just north of where they split from US 280/SR 30 northeast of Helena. As of the 2013 Telfair County map, the bypass was still proposed.

== State Route 730 ==
State Route 730
- Location: LaFayette

State Route 730 (SR 730) was a proposed state highway. In 1982, it was proposed as an eastern bypass of LaFayette, from southeast of the city to north-northeast of it. In 1988, US 27/SR 1 in the area was shifted eastward, onto the path of SR 730. Its former path through the city was redesignated as US 27 Bus./SR 1 Bus.

== State Route 732 ==
State Route 732
- Location: Athens

State Route 732 (SR 732) was a proposed state highway that was planned for the southwestern part of the Athens metropolitan area, almost entirely in Oconee County. In 1983, the southwestern part of the Athens Perimeter Highway, designated as SR 732, was proposed to be the final connecting piece of the freeway. In 1987, the Athens Perimeter Highway was completed, with SR 10 on the southern part.

== State Route 733 ==
State Route 733
- Location: Gilmer County

State Route 733 (SR 733) was a proposed state highway in the northeastern part of Gilmer County. Between 1977 and 1980, it was proposed between two intersections with US 76/SR 5 northeast of Ellijay. Between 1984 and 1991, US 76/SR 5/SR 515 was shifted onto the path of SR 733, replacing it.

== State Route 734 ==
State Route 734
- Location: Gilmer County

State Route 734 (SR 734) was a proposed state highway in the northeastern part of Gilmer County. Between 1977 and 1980, SR 734 was proposed from US 76/SR 5 south-southwest of Cherry Log, across US 76/SR 5 north-northeast of Cherry Log, and then to another intersection with US 76/SR 5 in Lucius. Between 1984 and 1991, US 76/SR 5/SR 515 was shifted onto the path of SR 734, replacing it.

== State Route 736 ==
State Route 736
- Location: Augusta

State Route 736 (SR 736) was a short proposed state highway that was planned in Augusta. In 1982, it was proposed to connect the eastern terminus of the John C. Calhoun Expressway (which would later carry SR 28), at 15th Street, with the western terminus of Greene Street, at SR 4 (13th Street). In 1985, SR 28 was shifted southwest, off of Broad Street northwest of 5th Street, and onto John C. Calhoun Expressway, the proposed path of SR 736, and Greene Street.

== State Route 741 ==
State Route 741
- Location: Crawfordville

State Route 741 (SR 741) was a proposed state highway that was planned in Crawfordville. In 1983, it was proposed as a western bypass of Crawfordville, from SR 22 southwest of the city to SR 22 northwest of it. In 1985, the path of SR 22 in Crawfordville was shifted westward, replacing the proposed path of SR 741.

== State Route 744 ==
State Route 744
- Location: Polk County

State Route 744 (SR 744) was a proposed state highway in the western part of Polk County. In 1987, it was proposed as an eastern bypass of Cedartown, from US 27/SR 1/SR 100 south-southwest of the city to US 27/SR 1 north-northeast of it. In 1991, the path of US 27/SR 1 through the area was shifted eastward, replacing the path of SR 744.

=== State Route 744 Spur ===
State Route 744 Spur
- Location: Cedartown

State Route 744 Spur (SR 744 Spur) was a proposed spur route of SR 744 that partially existed in the city limits of Cedartown. In 1987, it was proposed from US 27/SR 1/SR 100 in the city to the proposed path of SR 744 southeast of it. In 1991, US 278/SR 6 was shifted southward, out of the main part of the city, replacing the spur route.

== State Route 746 ==
State Route 746
- Location: Floyd County
- Existed: 1990–1992

State Route 746 (SR 746) was a state highway that existed in the east-central part of Floyd County, just to the east of Rome. In 1985, it was proposed from US 411/SR 20 southeast of Rome north-northeast and northwest to SR 53 at the eastern terminus of SR 53 Spur. In 1990, the portion of SR 746 between US 411/SR 20 and SR 293 was built. Two years later, all of the original completed and proposed portions of SR 746 from US 411/SR 20 to SR 53 and the entire length of SR 53 Spur were redesignated as parts of SR 1 Loop. At this time, a separate segment of SR 746 was proposed from SR 20 west-northwest of Rome south-southeast and southeast to US 27/US 411/SR 1/SR 53 just north-northeast of Six Mile, east-northeast to SR 101 south-southeast of Rome, and east-northeast and north-northeast to US 411/SR 20 at SR 1 Loop. Nearly a decade later, the proposed western terminus was shifted westward on SR 20 to begin at a point east-northeast of Coosa. In 2005, the entire length of SR 746 was cancelled.

This table shows the completed portion of SR 746. The entire route was in Floyd County.

Location	mi	km	Destinations	Notes
			US 411 / SR 20	Southern terminus
			SR 293	Northern terminus
1.000 mi = 1.609 km; 1.000 km = 0.621 mi

== State Route 747 ==
State Route 747
- Location: Newnan
- Existed: 1988–1989

State Route 747 (SR 747) was a short-lived state highway that existed just north of Newnan. In 1984, a northern bypass of Newnan was established from US 29/SR 14 just north of the city to SR 34 just northeast of it. However, it was unnumbered. The next year, a western extension of this bypass, designated as SR 747, was proposed to have a western terminus at SR 34 west of the city. In 1986, this bypass was then proposed as SR 34 Byp. The next year, it was re-proposed as SR 747. In 1988, it was completed as SR 747 from US 27 Alt./SR 16 to US 29/SR 14. The next year, this bypass was entirely redesignated as SR 34 Byp.

The entire route was in Coweta County.

Location	mi	km	Destinations	Notes
			US 27 Alt. / SR 16	Western terminus
			US 29 / SR 14	Eastern terminus
1.000 mi = 1.609 km; 1.000 km = 0.621 mi

== State Route 748 ==
State Route 748
- Location: Polk County

State Route 748 (SR 748) was a proposed state highway In 1987, it was proposed as part of an eastern bypass of Rockmart, from SR 113 east-northeast of the city south and south-southeast to US 278/SR 6 east-southeast of Van Wert. In 1990, US 278/SR 6 was shifted northeast from Van Wert on SR 113 and southeast on the proposed path of SR 748, with SR 101/SR 113 concurrent with them to Yorkville.

== State Route 754 ==
State Route 754
- Location: Cobb and Cherokee counties
- Existed: 1985–2003

State Route 754 (SR 754) was a state highway that existed in Cobb and Cherokee counties. The roadway that would eventually become SR 754 was established at least as early as 1919 as part of SR 5. SR 5's path between Marietta and northeast of Canton was shifted onto Interstate 575 (I-575), replacing SR 713 on that path. The portion between Marietta and west-northwest of Lebanon was redesignated as SR 754. In 1986, the southern terminus was truncated to just north of Piedmont Road north of Marietta. The next year, the southern terminus was re-extended to the northern terminus of SR 5 Spur. In 1991, the northern terminus was truncated to SR 92 southwest of Woodstock. In 1995, the southern terminus was truncated to just south of the Cobb–Cherokee county line. In 1997, the southern terminus was truncated to the county line itself. In 2003, the highway was decommissioned.

County	Location	mi	km	Destinations	Notes
Cobb				SR 5 Spur south	Southern terminus of SR 754; northern terminus of SR 5 Spur; roadway continues as Canton Road, a former segment of SR 5.
Cherokee				SR 92	
Cherokee	Lebanon			Main Street	Former segment of SR 5
Cherokee				I-575 / SR 5	Northern terminus; I-575/SR 5 exit 6
1.000 mi = 1.609 km; 1.000 km = 0.621 mi

== State Route 758 ==
State Route 758
- Location: Macon

State Route 758 (SR 758) was a proposed state highway that was planned in the southeastern part of Macon. In 1985, it was proposed as a southeastern rerouting of US 80, from the intersection of US 80/SR 22 (Eisenhower Parkway) and US 41 Bus./US 129/SR 11/SR 49 east-northeast and north-northeast to US 23/US 80/US 129 Alt./SR 19/SR 87 (Emery Highway). In 1998, the entire length of SR 758 (except for the westernmost portion) was canceled. The western part was built as an eastern extension of Eisenhower Parkway, but as an unnumbered road.

== State Route 759 ==
State Route 759
- Location: Commerce
- Existed: 1991–1992

State Route 759 (SR 759) was a very short-lived state highway that existed entirely within the northern part of Jackson County, to the east of Commerce. In 1989, it was proposed as an eastern bypass of the main part of Commerce, from US 441/SR 15 south-southeast of Commerce to another intersection north-northeast of the city. In 1991, SR 759 around Commerce was completed. The next year, the path of US 441/SR 15 in the Commerce area was shifted eastward, replacing SR 759. The former path of US 441, on SR 334 and SR 98, was redesignated as US 441 Bus.

The entire route was in Jackson County.

Location	mi	km	Destinations	Notes
			US 441 / SR 15	Southern terminus
			SR 334	
			SR 98	
			SR 326	
			SR 59	
			US 441 / SR 15	Northern terminus
1.000 mi = 1.609 km; 1.000 km = 0.621 mi

== State Route 765 ==
State Route 765
- Location: Homer

State Route 765 (SR 765) was a proposed state highway that existed in the Homer area. In 1991, it was proposed as an eastern bypass of Homer, from US 441/SR 15/SR 164 south-southeast of Homer to US 441/SR 15 north-northeast of the city. In 2004, the path of US 441/SR 15/Proposed SR 803 in the Homer area was shifted eastward, onto the proposed path of SR 765.

== State Route 768 ==
State Route 768
- Location: Paulding County

State Route 768 (SR 768) was a proposed state highway in Paulding County. In 1987, it was proposed as a southern bypass of Dallas, from west-southwest of the city to US 278/SR 6/SR 120 southeast of it; this replaced the proposed path of SR 6 Byp. In 1990, US 278/SR 6/SR 120 was routed on the proposed path of SR 768.

=== State Route 768 Spur ===
State Route 768 Spur
- Location: Paulding County

State Route 768 Spur (SR 768 Spur) was a proposed spur route of SR 768 that was planned to be placed in the east-central part of Paulding County, north-northwest of the city limits of Hiram. Between the beginning of 1982 and the beginning of 1987, it was planned to be designated between the proposed path of SR 768 and US 278/SR 6/SR 120, at the point where they met the western terminus of SR 360. In 1990, US 278/SR 6/SR 120 was shifted southward, onto the proposed path of SR 768, with SR 120/SR 360 shifted onto the proposed path of SR 768 Spur.

== State Route 771 ==
State Route 771
- Location: Fannin County
- Existed: 1995–2001

State Route 771 (SR 771) was a proposed state highway in the north-central part of Fannin County. In 1986, it was proposed from SR 5 south of McCaysville to the Tennessee state line north-northwest of the city. 1996 maps still showed the route on this proposed path, though the route was never built. In 2001, the proposal was cancelled.

== State Route 773 ==
State Route 773
- Location: Tallulah Falls

State Route 773 (SR 773) was a proposed state highway that was proposed partially for the town of Tallulah Falls. In 1986, it was proposed as a western cut-off, on a more direct path between two intersections with US 23/US 441/SR 15 from south of Tallulah Falls and into the city. The next year, the path of US 23/US 441/SR 15 in the Tallulah Falls area was shifted westward, onto the proposed path of SR 773. The former path was redesignated as SR 15 Loop.

== State Route 789 ==
State Route 789
- Location: Polk and Paulding counties

State Route 789 (SR 789) was a proposed state highway in Polk and Paulding counties. In 1987, it was proposed as a northeastern bypass of Yorkville, from north-northeast of Yorkville to east of it. In 1993, US 278/SR 6 was shifted northeast from Yorkville onto the former proposed path of SR 789

== State Route 793 ==
State Route 793
- Location: Bremen

State Route 793 (SR 793) was a proposed state highway in the north-central part of Carroll County and the southern part of Haralson County. In 1988, it was proposed as a western bypass of Bremen, from south-southwest of the city to north-northwest of it. In 1993, US 27/SR 1 in the Bremen area was shifted westward, onto the path of SR 793. The former path was redesignated as US 27 Bus./SR 1 Bus.

== State Route 811 ==
State Route 811
- Location: Haralson County

State Route 811 (SR 811) was a proposed state highway in the central portion of Haralson County. In 1989, it was proposed from US 27/SR 1 south-southeast of Buchanan north-northwest across US 27/SR 1, and curved around the east side of the city to a point north-northwest of it. In 1992, US 27/SR 1 was rerouted onto the proposed path of SR 811 and was shifted east of the city. The former path was redesignated as US 27 Bus./SR 1 Bus.

== State Route 813 ==
State Route 813
- Location: Walker County

State Route 813 (SR 813) was a proposed state highway in the northern part of Walker County. In 1994, it was proposed as a western bypass of the Chickamauga and Chattanooga National Military Park, from US 27/SR 1 east-northeast of Chickamauga to SR 2 west-southwest of Fort Oglethorpe. In 2001, US 27/SR 1's path through the Chickamauga and Chattanooga National Military Park was shifted westward, onto the path of SR 813.

== State Route 816 ==
State Route 816
- Location: Sandersville

State Route 816 (SR 816) was a proposed state highway that was proposed in the northern part of Sandersville, in the central part of Washington County. In 1988, it was proposed as a northern bypass of Sandersville, from Deepstep Road northwest of the city to SR 88 east-northeast of it. The next year, the proposed path of SR 816 was extended southwest to SR 24 west of the city. In 1991, the path of SR 88 was extended westward, replacing the proposed path of SR 816.

== State Route 817 ==
State Route 817
- Location: Gwinnett, Barrow, and Oconee counties

State Route 817 (SR 817) was a proposed state highway that was planned form Gwinnett, Barrow, and Oconee counties. In 1989, a southern bypass of the Dacula–Athens area, designated as SR 817, was proposed from US 29/SR 8 (and what was then the eastern terminus of SR 316) west-southwest of Dacula to the southwest corner of the Athens Perimeter Highway. In 1991, SR 817's path from west-southwest of Dacula to SR 11 north of Bethlehem was completed as an eastern extension of SR 316. In 1993, SR 817's path from north of Bethlehem to US 78/SR 10 southeast of Bogart was also completed as an eastern extension of SR 316, with US 29 shifted onto its entire length, from what was the western terminus of the proposed path of SR 817. SR 8 was shifted onto US 29/SR 316 from southeast of Russell to southeast of Bogart. In 1996, SR 817's path in the southwestern part of Athens was completed as an eastern extension of SR 316, with US 29/US 78/SR 8 concurrent with it.

== State Route 818 ==
State Route 818
- Location: Watkinsville

State Route 818 (SR 818) was a proposed state highway that was planned for the Watkinsville area. In 1990, a western bypass of the city, then proposed as a northern extension of SR 186, was planned from US 129/US 441/SR 24 north-northeast of Bishop to US 129/US 441/SR 15 in the southern part of Athens. In 1992, this bypass was then proposed as SR 818. In 1995, the path of US 129/US 441/SR 24, with SR 15 north of SR 24's northern terminus, was shifted westward, replacing the proposed path of SR 818. The former path of US 129/US 441/SR 24 was redesignated as US 129 Bus./US 441 Bus./SR 24 Bus.

== State Route 822 ==
State Route 822
- Location: Dublin
- Existed: 1989–1992

State Route 822 (SR 822) was a state highway that existed entirely within the city limits of Dublin. In 1989, it was established from just south of the CSX railroad tracks in Dublin north-northwest to US 80/US 319/SR 26/SR 29/SR 31 (Bellevue Avenue). In 1992, the path of SR 31 in Dublin was shifted east-southeastward, off of US 319/US 441/SR 19 and US 80/US 319/SR 26/SR 29, and onto the path of SR 822.

The entire route was in Dublin, Laurens County.

mi	km	Destinations	Notes
		Downtown Dublin	Southern terminus
		US 80 / US 319 / SR 26 / SR 29 / SR 31 (Bellevue Avenue)	Northern terminus
1.000 mi = 1.609 km; 1.000 km = 0.621 mi

== State Route 826 ==
State Route 826
- Location: Eatonton

State Route 826 (SR 826) was a proposed state highway that was planned in the western part of Eatonton, in the central part of Putnam County. In 1988, it was proposed as a western bypass of the city, from US 129/SR 44 in Warfield to US 129/US 441/SR 24 north of Eatonton. In 1992, the path of US 129/US 441/SR 24 in this area was shifted westward, replacing the proposed path of SR 826.

== State Route 827 ==
State Route 827
- Location: Butler, Georgia

State Route 827 (SR 827) was a proposed state highway that was planned for the southern part of the Butler area. In 1993, it was proposed as a southern bypass of the main part of Butler, from SR 96 west-northwest of the city to another intersection with SR 96 east of the city. In 1999, this bypass's proposed designation, SR 827, was canceled. Later, in 2006, SR 96 was shifted onto the Butler bypass.

== State Route 828 ==
State Route 828
- Location: Jenkins County

State Route 828 (SR 828) was a proposed state highway that was planned in the central part of Jenkins County. In 1989, it was proposed as a northeastern bypass of Millen, from SR 21 east of the city to US 25/SR 121 north-northwest of it. In 1995, the path of SR 21 in the Millen area was shifted northward, replacing the path of SR 828.

== State Route 829 ==
State Route 829
- Location: Sylvania
- Existed: 1990–1993

State Route 829 was a state highway that existed just south of Sylvania. In 1988, an unnumbered road was built from US 301/SR 73 at the southern terminus of SR 73 Loop south-southwest of Sylvania to SR 21 southeast of the city. In 1990, this road was designated as SR 829. In 1993, the path of SR 21 in the Sylvania area was shifted south-southwest, replacing the path of SR 829 and then routed on US 301/SR 73 Loop. Its former path was redesignated as SR 21 Bus.

The entire route was in Screven County.

Location	mi	km	Destinations	Notes
			US 301 / SR 73 / SR 73 Loop north	Western terminus of SR 829; southern terminus of SR 73 Loop
			SR 21	Eastern terminus
1.000 mi = 1.609 km; 1.000 km = 0.621 mi

== State Route 831 ==
State Route 831
- Location: Decatur County

State Route 831 (SR 831) was a proposed state highway in the southeastern part of Decatur County. In 1989, it was proposed as an eastern bypass of Attapulgus, from east-southeast of the city to north-northwest of it. In 1995, US 27/SR 1 was shifted onto this bypass. Its former path was redesignated as SR 1 Bus.

== State Route 835 ==
State Route 835
- Location: Habersham County

State Route 835 (SR 835) was a proposed state highway that was planned for the northern part of Habersham County. In 1989, it was proposed as an eastern bypass of Hollywood and Turnerville, from SR 17 just south of Hollywood to US 23/US 441/SR 15 south-southwest of Tallulah Falls. In 1993, the path of US 23/US 441/SR 15, from Hollywood to Tallulah Falls, was shifted eastward, onto the proposed path of SR 835.

== State Route 838 ==
State Route 838
- Location: Early County

State Route 838 (SR 838) was a proposed state highway in the north-central part of Early County. In 1992, it was proposed as an eastern bypass of Blakely, from south-southeast of the city to north-northeast of it. The next year, US 27/SR 1 in the Blakely area was shifted eastward, onto the path of SR 838. The former path through the city became US 27 Bus./SR 1 Bus.

== State Route 844 ==
State Route 844
- Location: Dublin

State Route 844 (SR 844) was a proposed state highway in the north-central part of Laurens County. Between the beginning of 1966 and the beginning of 1972, it was proposed as a western bypass of Dublin, from US 319/US 441/SR 31 south of the city to US 441/SR 29 north-northwest of it. By the beginning of 1977, this highway was canceled.

== State Route 847 ==
State Route 847
- Location: Randolph County

State Route 847 (SR 847) was a proposed state highway in the central part of Randolph County. In 1993, it was proposed as a southeastern bypass of Cuthbert, from south-southwest of the city to north-northeast of it. The next year, the path of US 27/SR 1 through the Cuthbert area was shifted eastward, onto the proposed path of SR 847. The former path was redesignated as US 27 Bus./SR 1 Bus.

== State Route 863 ==
State Route 863
- Location: Effingham County

State Route 863 (SR 863) was a proposed state highway that was planned for the central part of Effingham County. In 1993, it was proposed as a western bypass of Springfield, from SR 21 south-southeast of the city to another intersection with SR 21 northwest of it. In 1997, the path of SR 21 in the Springfield area was shifted westward, replacing the proposed path of SR 863.

== State Route 876 ==
State Route 876
- Location: Banks County

State Route 876 (SR 876) was a proposed state highway for the south-central part of Banks County, southeast of Hollingsworth. In 1992, it was proposed as a southeastern bypass of Hollingsworth, from US 441/SR 15 south-southeast of Hollingsworth to SR 198 southeast of the community. In 1997, the path of US 441/SR 15, from Homer to Cornelia, was shifted eastward, onto the proposed path of SR 876.

== State Route 877 ==
State Route 877
- Location: Banks County

State Route 877 (SR 877) was a proposed state highway that was planned for the north-central part of Banks County. In 1992, a cutoff, north-northeast of Hollingsworth, was proposed as an unnumbered road from Hollingsworth to US 441/SR 15 north-northwest of it. Two years later, the cutoff north-northeast of Hollingsworth, was then proposed as SR 877 and extended to SR 105 just east of the southern end of its concurrency with US 441/SR 15. In 2002, SR 877 was canceled.

== State Route 889 ==
State Route 889
- Location: Hall County
- Existed: 1993–1997

State Route 889 (SR 889) was a proposed state highway that was planned for the western part of Gainesville, in Hall County. In 1993, a western bypass of Gainesville, designated as SR 889, was proposed from SR 369/SR 60 to SR 53. It was concurrent with SR 53 Conn. to SR 369. It was decommissioned in 1997.

== State Route 896 ==
State Route 896
- Location: Ware County

State Route 896 (SR 896) was a proposed state highway that was planned for the northwestern part of Ware County. In 1992, a northwestern bypass of Waycross, designated as SR 896, was proposed from US 82/SR 520 east-southeast of Waresboro to US 1/US 23/SR 4 north-northeast of Waresboro. In 1995, the path of US 1/US 23/SR 4 through the Waycross, Georgia micropolitan area was shifted to the west, replacing the route of SR 896. The former path was redesignated as US 1 Bus./US 23 Bus./SR 4 Bus.

== State Route 899 ==
State Route 899
- Location: Gray

State Route 899 (SR 899) was a proposed state highway that was planned as a northern bypass of Gray. Between the beginning of 1996 and the beginning of 2010, it was proposed from US 129/SR 11/SR 18/SR 22 southwest of Clinton, at the west end of SR 18's concurrency with US 129/SR 11/SR 22, to SR 22 east-northeast of Gray. In 2016, this bypass was canceled.

== State Route 901 ==
State Route 901
- Location: Athens

State Route 901 (SR 901) was a proposed state highway that was planned within the city limits of Athens. In 1992, it was proposed as a slightly western rerouting of US 129/US 441/SR 15 in the southern part of Athens. Its path was from US 129/US 441/SR 15 southwest of their southern interchange with what is now SR 10 Loop north-northwest to Timothy Road just north of the freeway. In 2001, the path of US 129/US 441/SR 15 in the southern part of Athens was shifted westward, onto the proposed path of SR 901 south of the freeway.

== State Route 920 ==
State Route 920
- Length: 17.1 mi (27.5 km)
- Existed: 1994–2023

State Route 920 (SR 920) was a 17.1-mile (27.5 km) arterial road in the Metro Atlanta area in the state of Georgia. The route number was a temporary designation placed along the route while it is upgraded to be converted to be a future alignment of SR 81. It connects the county seat of Henry County, McDonough, to the seat of Fayette County, Fayetteville via SR 54. It is known locally as Jonesboro Street in the city limits of McDonough, Jonesboro Road in Henry County, and McDonough Road in Clayton and Fayette counties. In honor of the late founder of Chick-fil-A, the majority of the route is signed as the S. Truett Cathy Highway. In August of 2023, the route was officially dissolved.

== State Route 932 ==
State Route 932
- Location: Gray

State Route 932 (SR 932) was a proposed state highway that was planned inside the city limits of Gray. In 1993, it was proposed as a southern bypass of the main part of the city, from US 129/SR 11/SR 18/SR 22 in the southwestern part to SR 22 east-northeast of the city. The next year, the proposed path of SR 932 was truncated to SR 18 in the southeastern part of Gray. In 1998, the path of SR 18 in Gray was shifted southward, replacing the proposed path of SR 932.

== State Route 1011 ==
State Route 1011
- Location: Columbia County

State Route 1011 (SR 1011) was a short proposed state highway that was planned for the southeastern part of Columbia County. Between January 1964 and January 1970, it was proposed from SR 28 west-northwest of Martinez east-northeast to Blackstone Camp Road. By January 1975, it was canceled. Between January 1997 and January 2009, this proposed path would be used as a northward shifting of the southern terminus of Blackstone Camp Road. Its former path was renamed simply Old Blackstone Camp Road.

Browse numbered routes
← I-985	GA	→ SR 1017

== State Route 1056 ==
State Route 1056
- Location: Martinez
- Existed: 2008–2012

State Route 1056 (SR 1056) was a short state highway that existed in the central part of Martinez. Between January 1997 and January 2009, it was established on Davis Road from either Executive Center Drive or King Road west-northwest to SR 104 (Washington Road). By January 2013, it was decommissioned.

The entire route was in Martinez, Columbia County.

mi	km	Destinations	Notes
		Executive Center Drive / Davis Road south	Southern terminus; terminus could have been at King Road; continued as Davis Road.
		SR 104 (Washington Road) / Davis Road ends	Northern terminus of SR 1056 and Davis Road
1.000 mi = 1.609 km; 1.000 km = 0.621 mi

== State Route 1082 ==
State Route 1082
- Location: Evans and Martinez
- Existed: 2008–2012

State Route 1082 (SR 1082) was a state highway that existed entirely in Martinez with portions proposed in Evans and Martinez. Between January 1997 and January 2009, it had three proposed segments and one signed portion. The westernmost segment was proposed from SR 104 (Washington Road) at the northern terminus of Towne Centre Drive east-southeast to Rountree Way, just southeast of Columbia Industrial Boulevard. The second portion was from Rountree Way, just northwest of Columbia Industrial Boulevard, east-northeast slightly to Columbia Industrial Boulevard. The third portion was from Blue Ridge Drive, just southwest of its southern intersection with Halifax Drive, to Old Evans Road, just south-southeast of River Watch Parkway. The fourth portion, which was indicated to be signed, was on River Watch Parkway, from Old Evans Road east-southeast and southeast to Baston Road. By January 2013, the second and third segments were canceled, and the fourth segment was decommissioned. By January 2017, the first segment was canceled.

The entire route was in Columbia County.

Location	mi	km	Destinations	Notes
Evans			SR 104 (Washington Road)	Western terminus of segment 1
Martinez			Rountree Way	Eastern terminus of segment 1
Gap in route
Evans			Rountree Way	Western terminus of segment 2
Martinez			Columbia Industrial Boulevard	Eastern terminus of segment 2
Gap in route
Martinez			Blue Ridge Drive	Western terminus of segment 3
Martinez			Old Evans Road	Eastern terminus of segment 3
Gap in route
Martinez			Old Evans Road	Western terminus of segment 4
Martinez			Baston Road / River Watch Parkway east	Eastern terminus of segment 4
1.000 mi = 1.609 km; 1.000 km = 0.621 mi: Unopened

== State Route 1109 ==
State Route 1109
- Location: Springfield

State Route 1109 (SR 1109) was a proposed state highway that was planned for the central part of Effingham County. Between the beginning of 1997 and the beginning of 2010, it was proposed as a northern bypass of Springfield, from SR 21 north-northwest of the city to SR 119 in the northern part of the city. Between the beginning of 2012 and the beginning of 2015, SR 1109 was canceled.
