= Satolah, Georgia =

Unincorporated community in Georgia, U.S.

Coordinates: 34°59′25″N 83°11′35″W

Satolah is an unincorporated community in Rabun County, in the U.S. state of Georgia.

== History ==
A post office called Satolah was established in 1920, and remained in operation until 1967. Satolah is a name derived from the Cherokee language meaning "six". The original application for a post office was under the name Satulah, for a mountain easily viewed from the area. The US government misspelled it so the name stuck almost to the point of erasing the use of the name Moccasin referring to the area.
