= Ivy Log, Georgia =

Ivy Log
- Town
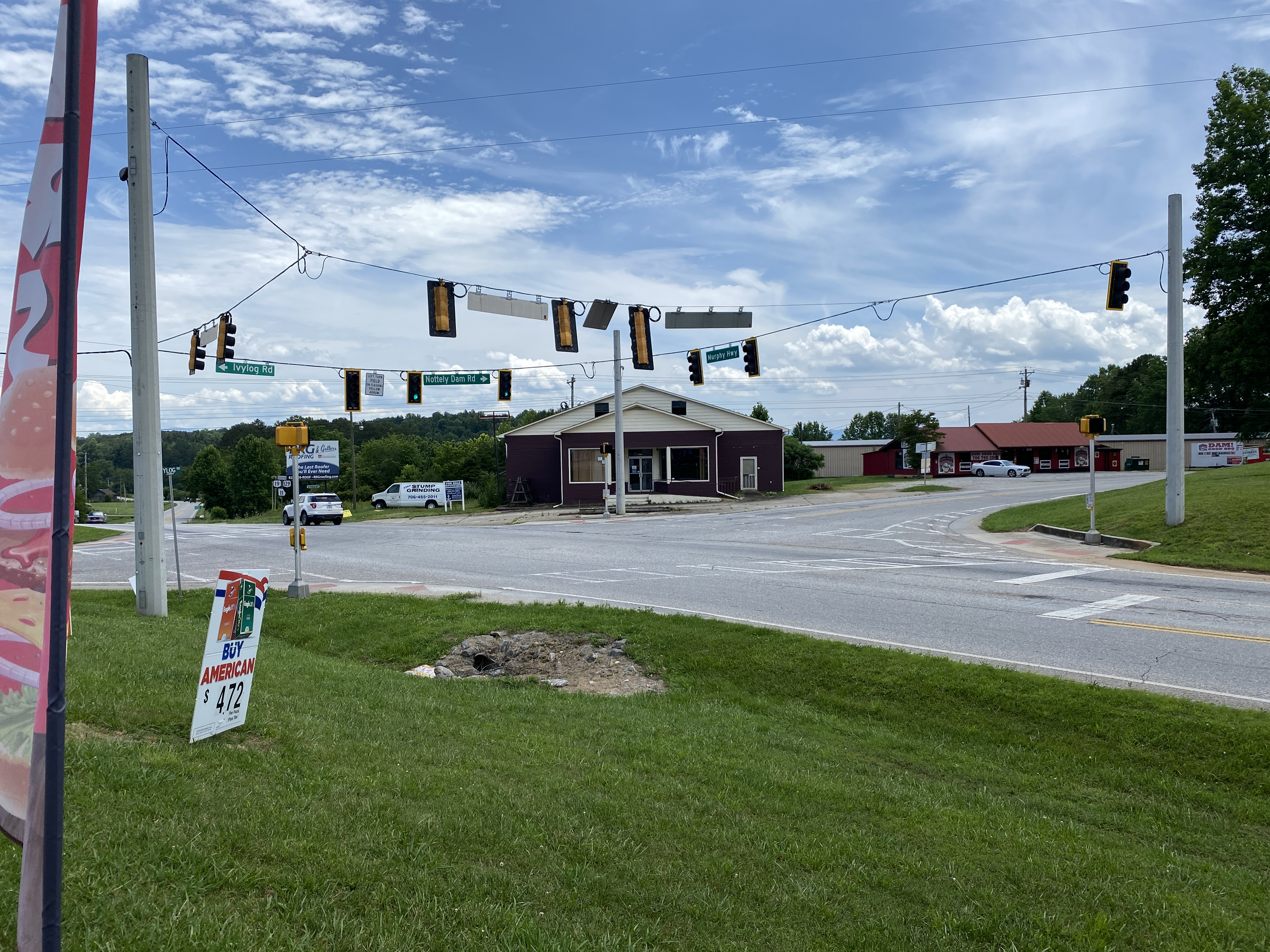
- Ivy Log in 2023

- Location in Georgia
- Coordinates: 34.962185°N 84.058993°W
- Country: United States
- State: Georgia
- County: Union
- Elevation: 1,880 ft (570 m)
- GNIS feature ID: 0332075

Ivy Log (or Ivylog) is a town in Union County, Georgia, United States. The original town centered on Casteel Mill at the mouth of Ivy Log Creek. Ivy Log is located along US 19/US129/SR 11 at the east end of SR 325.
