= Clarkdale, Georgia =

Unincorporated community in Georgia, U.S.

Coordinates: 33°49′51″N 84°38′59″W

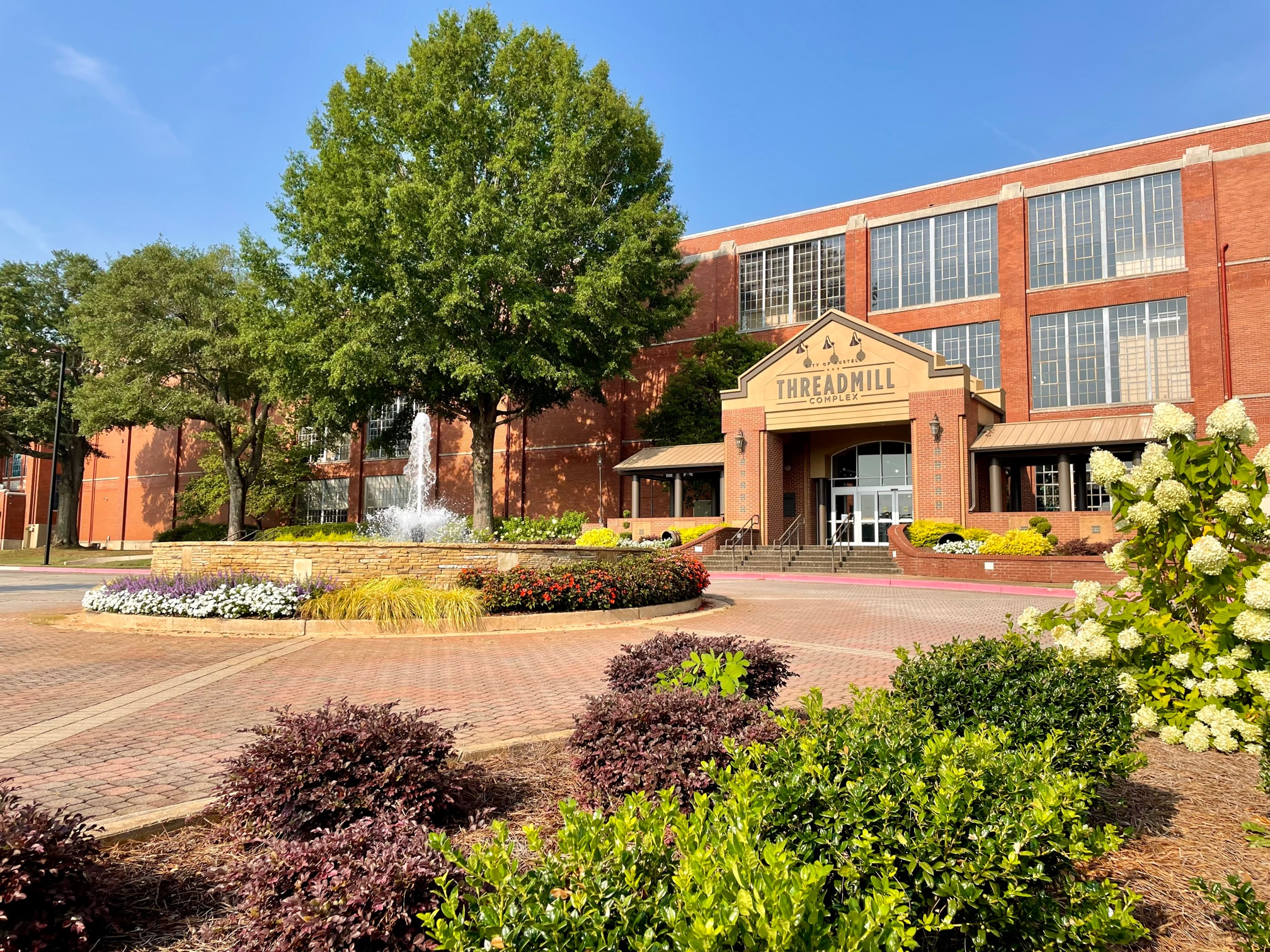
Threadmill Complex

Clarkdale is an unincorporated community west-northwest of Atlanta, Georgia, in southwestern Cobb County. It has a post office with ZIP Code 30111 and is the hometown of novelty and country singer Ray Stevens. The population in 2020 was 23,401.

Clarkdale began as a mill village built in 1932 to support a spinning mill of the Coats & Clark Thread Company. Both the mill and the neighborhood, consisting of 98 dwellings (a mixture of single-family and duplex floorplans), were designed by North Carolina architect Joseph Emory Sirrine. The neighborhood boasted many modern conveniences for the time, such as electricity and indoor plumbing. Additionally, residents enjoyed a public swimming pool, a community house for public functions, and a mill-sponsored baseball team. As the mill thrived, the community fostered the growth of several local businesses, a dedicated post office, and two churches, both of which still hold religious services as of 2020.

Layoffs in the 1950s and 1960s preceded the mill's closing in 1983; in 1966, the homes were sold to current residents, many of whom were current or former employees of the mill. In 1987, Clarkdale was listed in the National Register of Historic Places.

During the historic September 2009 Atlanta floods, Clarkdale Elementary School (part of Cobb County Public Schools) was ruined by Noses Creek in the hours after students and faculty evacuated. Although it was outside the 100-year flood plain, massive rainfall and upstream land development caused the stream to swell to more than 10 times its normal height, also flooding other locations in Clarkdale. The new Clarkdale Elementary School opened at a different location in August 2012.
