= Hollingsworth, Georgia =

- Unincorporated community
- Location within the state of Georgia Hollingsworth, Georgia (the United States)
- Coordinates: 34°26′19″N 83°30′30″W
- Country: United States
- State: Georgia
- County: Banks
- Elevation: 915 ft (279 m)
- Time zone: UTC-5 (Eastern (EST))
  - Summer (DST): UTC-4 (EDT)
- Area codes: 706 & 762
- GNIS ID: 332009

Hollingsworth is an unincorporated community in Banks County, Georgia, United States.
