= Yorkville, Georgia =

Unincorporated area in Paulding County, Georgia

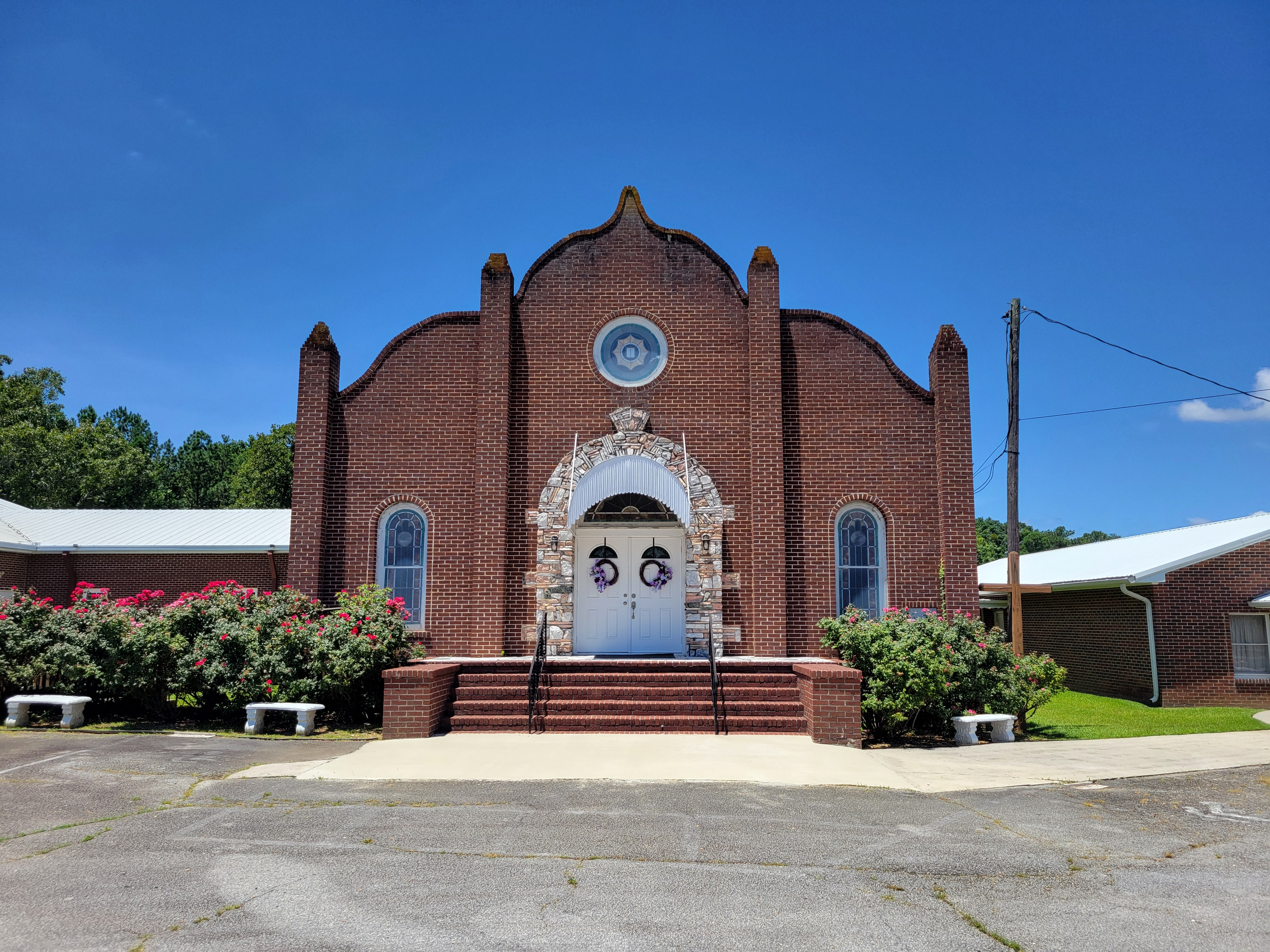
Yorkville Baptist Church

Yorkville is an unincorporated area in Paulding County, Georgia, United States, located near the crossroads of Hwy 113 and Gold Mine Road (FIPS: 93462). Its elevation is 1,362 feet (415 m).

== Geography ==
Yorkville is located at the coordinates 33.924°N 84.995°W with an elevation of 1362/415 ft. According to the United States Census Bureau, the city has a total of 95.86 square miles: 95.494 of which is land and 0.371 of which is water. In comparison, Paulding County has a land mass of 313.43 square miles. This means Yorkville is 1/3 of Paulding's land mass.

== Demographics ==
As of 2018, the United States Census Bureau ACS 5-year Estimates listed a total population of 18,158, 6,186 households, and 4,450 families. The total housing units total 6,544 with 4,477 owned and 1,709 rented. The racial makeup included 76.7% white, 17.1% African American, 3.4% two or more races, 1.2% Asian, and 1.6% from other races. Hispanic or Latino of any race was 7%.

Looking at the population aged 25 and above, there are 11,032 people. 10,047 (91.07%) obtained a high school/general education diploma or higher, while 985 (8.93%) do not hold a diploma or its equivalent.
