= Georgia State Route 22 =

State highway in Georgia

State Route 22
- SR 22 highlighted in red

Route information
- Maintained by GDOT
- Length: 223.45 mi (359.61 km)
- Existed: 1919–present

Major junctions
- West end: US 80 / SR 8 / SR 540 at the Alabama state line in Columbus
- I-185 / US 27 / SR 1 in Columbus; US 19 / SR 3 southwest of Salem; I-475 in Macon; US 41 / SR 247 in Macon; I-75 / SR 540 in Macon; I-16 / US 23 / US 80 / SR 19 / SR 49 / SR 87 in Macon; US 129 / SR 11 / SR 18 / SR 44 in Gray; US 441 / US 441 Bus. / SR 24 / SR 112 in Milledgeville; I-20 near Crawfordville; US 78 / SR 10 / SR 77 in Lexington
- North end: SR 72 / SR 98 in Comer

Location
- Country: United States
- State: Georgia
- Counties: Muscogee, Talbot, Taylor, Upson, Crawford, Bibb, Jones, Baldwin, Hancock, Taliaferro, Oglethorpe, Madison

Highway system
- Georgia State Highway System; Interstate; US; State; Special
← SR 21	→ US 23

State Route 22 (SR 22) is a 223.45-mile-long (359.61 km) state highway that travels southwest-to-northeast in an eastern arc through portions of Muscogee, Talbot, Taylor, Upson, Crawford, Bibb, Jones, Baldwin, Hancock, Taliaferro, Oglethorpe, and Madison counties in the western and west-central parts of the U.S. state of Georgia. The highway connects the Alabama state line in Columbus, across the state line from Phenix City, Alabama, to Comer, via Macon and Milledgeville.

SR 22 originally traveled only from Columbus to Macon, and was incrementally extended to Comer in stages. It was rerouted many times in Columbus and formerly had a more northern path in the Macon area.

The part of the highway from the Alabama state line east to Geneva is part of the Fall Line Freeway (SR 540), a long-distance four-lane highway that extends from Columbus to Augusta. Also, this section could be included in the proposed eastern extension of Interstate 14 (I-14).

== Route description ==
=== Columbus to Macon ===
SR 22 begins at the Alabama state line, concurrent with US 80 and SR 540 (Fall Line Freeway). The limited-access section of this highway in Columbus is known as the J.R. Allen Parkway, named after the mayor of Columbus during its consolidation with Muscogee County. The same stretch of road is also known colloquially as the North Bypass, originally designed to bypass Columbus before urban sprawl placed the highway in the middle of both residential and commercial growth. Almost immediately into Georgia, the road has an interchange with the northern terminus of SR 22 Conn. (2nd Avenue). The next exit is an interchange with SR 219 (River Road). After that is Bradley Park Drive. Then the road has a full cloverleaf interchange with Interstate 185 (I-185). The same exit lanes for I-185 are also used for US 27/SR 1 (Veterans Parkway) and Moon Road. The final limited-access exit heading eastbound is a shared exit with Schomburg and Blackmon roads. The highway then curves to the southeast before an interchange with US 27 Alt./SR 85 (Manchester Expressway), becoming a four-lane divided highway. In another 1.6 miles, SR 22 meets the eastern terminus of SR 22 Spur (Macon Road). The highway then parallels the northern border of Fort Benning and travels through the community of Upatoi, still inside the Columbus city limits. The road then crosses Baker Creek into Talbot County, traveling just north of the community of Box Springs and later meeting the northern terminus of SR 355. Just before entering Geneva, SR 41 joins the concurrency. In Geneva, SR 22 meets the western terminus of SR 96. SR 540 departs the concurrency on SR 96 and continues east as a four-lane divided highway, while US 80 and SR 22 turn to the north on a two-lane road. In Talbotton, they intersect SR 90/SR 208 (Clark Street). At this intersection, SR 90 meets its western terminus, and SR 208 joins the concurrency very briefly and departs at Monroe Street. A few blocks later, SR 41 also leaves the concurrency to the north on Washington Avenue, while US 80/SR 22 curves east. After traveling through rural areas of the county, the road enters the far northern part of Taylor County. They intersect US 19/SR 3, which join the concurrency. The four highways cross over the Flint River into Upson County. Not long afterward, US 80/SR 22 splits off to resume an eastern course, shortly entering Crawford County. In Roberta, they intersect US 341/SR 7/SR 42 (Dugger Avenue). At this intersection, SR 42 joins the concurrency. The three highways pass the Crawford County Public Library and Crawford County Middle School. In nearby Knoxville, SR 42 departs the concurrency, while US 80/SR 22 curves east-northeast into the rural eastern part of Crawford County. The highway then crosses Echeconnee Creek into Bibb County and the community of Lizella, widening to a four-lane divided highway shortly before entering the city of Macon and taking on the name Eisenhower Parkway.

=== Macon metropolitan area ===
As a divided highway, US 80/SR 22 travels by Macon State College before an interchange with I-475. The highway then enters more dense commercial developments including Macon Mall and Central Georgia Technical College before intersecting US 41/SR 247 (Pio Nono Avenue) next to Westgate Mall. Just under 2,000 feet (610 m) later, US 80/SR 22 has an interchange with I-75/SR 540. Then, they pass Saints Rest Cemetery and Memorial Park, before they intersect US 41 Bus./US 129/SR 11/SR 49 (Broadway). At this intersection, all six highways travel concurrently to the north and curve to the northeast. At Walnut Street, US 41 Bus./SR 22/SR 49 splits off to the northwest. At 2nd Street, SR 22 departs to the northeast. There is an interchange with US 129/SR 11/SR 87 that is only accessible from the westbound lanes. Immediately, the road crosses over the Ocmulgee River and passes over I-16/SR 540 (Jim Gillis Historic Savannah Parkway), which has a partial interchange with SR 22, but no access to I-16/SR 540 from either direction of SR 22 or to SR 22 from I-16/SR 540 east. Just west of Coliseum Medical Center is an intersection with US 23/US 129 Alt./SR 19 (Emery Highway). At this intersection, US 129 Alt. travels concurrently with SR 22 to the north for just over 500 feet (150 m). At the intersection with US 129/SR 11/SR 49, US 129 Alt. meets its northern terminus, and SR 22 joins that concurrency to the north-northeast. Less than 4,000 feet (1,200 m) later, SR 49 (Shurling Drive) splits off to the east.

=== Jones County to Comer ===
US 129/SR 11/SR 22 crosses over Walnut Creek and then enters Jones County. Just before intersecting SR 18, the concurrency passes by Brasswells Lake, Newberry Lake, and Anderson Lake. On the southwestern edge of the city limits of Gray, SR 18 joins the concurrency. The four highways enter the main part of the town. At Bill Conn Parkway, SR 18 splits off to the southeast. At Atlanta Road, SR 11 departs the concurrency to the north. One block later, they intersect SR 44. Here, US 129 heads to the north, concurrent with SR 44, while SR 22 continues to the northeast. Just outside town, it passes Lake Jonesco Golf Course. After traveling through Haddock, the route enters Baldwin County. After entering Milledgeville, it passes the Walter B. Williams, Jr. Park. Immediately afterward, it meets the southern terminus of SR 212. Then, it intersects US 441/SR 29 (Robertson Mill Road). SR 22 passes by Youth Development Center Lake and Oconee Regional Medical Center. It curves to the south-southeast and then to the east-northeast and intersects US 441 Bus./SR 24/SR 29 Bus. (North Columbia Street). The four highways travel concurrently to the east-northeast on West Montgomery Street. One block later, US 441 Bus. departs to the south-southeast on North Clark Street, concurrent with SR 29 Bus. SR 22/SR 24 parallel the northern edge of Georgia College & State University. At North Elbert Street, the concurrency turns to the right and meets the northern terminus of SR 49 (East Hancock Street) and the former northern terminus of SR 112 (South Elbert Street). At this intersection, SR 22/SR 24 turn to the left onto East Hancock Street and leave town by crossing over the Oconee River. The two highways diverge with SR 22 heading to the northeast and entering Hancock County. In Sparta, it intersects SR 15/SR 16 (Broad Street). The three highways travel north-northwest and leave town. Almost immediately, they curve to the north-northeast and split, with SR 15/SR 22 continuing straight ahead. After a curve back to the north-northwest, SR 22 splits to the northeast and travels through Powelton. Then, the highway enters Taliaferro County. After an interchange with I-20 (Carl Sanders Highway), it enters Crawfordville, where it intersects US 278/SR 12 (Broad Street). It parallels the southwestern edge of A. H. Stephens Historic Park and leaves town. It crosses over the South Fork Little River and North Fork Little River before intersecting SR 44. Then, it very gradually curves to the northwest and enters Oglethorpe County. It intersects US 78/SR 10 southeast of Lexington. The concurrency crosses the southeasternmost corner of the city limits on Main Street. Just over 1,000 feet (300 m) later, SR 77 (Elberton Road) joins the concurrency and leaves on Union Point Road. On the northwesternmost corner of the city limits, SR 22 splits off to the northeast on Comer Road. The highway crosses over the South Fork Broad River into Madison County. Almost immediately, SR 22 enters the southern city limits of Comer. At Comer Bypass, it meets its eastern terminus, an intersection with SR 72 and southern terminus of SR 98.

=== National Highway System ===
The following portions of SR 22 are part of the National Highway System, a system of routes determined to be the most important for the nation's economy, mobility, and defense:

- From its western terminus to its intersection with SR 96 in Geneva (completely concurrent with US 80 and SR 540)
- From its interchange with I-475 in western Macon to its intersection with US 41 Bus./US 129/SR 11/SR 49 in southeastern Macon (completely concurrent with US 80)
- From the eastern end of its concurrency with US 80 to the point where the concurrency with US 129/SR 11/SR 49 meet the northern city limits
- From Gray to the eastern end of the SR 24 concurrency east of Milledgeville
- The entire length of the SR 15 concurrency from Sparta to a point north of the city
- The entire length of the US 78/SR 10 concurrency from a point southeast of the city to the northwestern part of the city.

== History ==
=== 1920s to 1940s ===
SR 22 was established at least as early as 1919 from SR 1 in Columbus to Macon. At this time, SR 11 was established from Macon to SR 20 in Gray, and SR 20 was established from SR 11 in Gray to Sparta. By the end of September 1921, SR 22 was extended along the path of SR 11 from Macon to Gray. SR 20's path from Gray to Sparta was redesignated as an eastern extension of SR 22. By October 1926, US 80 was designated on the Columbus–Macon segment, and US 129 was designated on Macon–Gray segment. By October 1929, US 19 was designated on the portion of US 80/SR 22 southwest of Salem. In early 1935, SR 22 was extended north-northeast to Crawfordville. The 1938 GDOT map, the first one with inset maps, showed that US 80 entered Georgia on the 14th Street Bridge. US 80 and SR 22 traveled east on 14th Street, turned right onto US 27/SR 1/SR 85/SR 103 (1st Avenue) and traveled to the south, turned left onto 11th Street and traveled to the east, curved to the northeast on Wynnton Road, and then left Columbus. US 80 and SR 22 were indicated to have entered Macon on Montpelier Avenue, turned left on College Street and traveled to the northeast, turned right onto Georgia Avenue and traveled to the east-southeast, and turned left onto US 129/SR 11, before leaving the city. Later in 1938, SR 22 was extended north-northwest to the northern part of Taliaferro County. In the third quarter of 1939, it was extended again, to the northwest to end at US 78/SR 10 in the southeastern part of Lexington. At the end of 1940, SR 22 was extended northward to Comer. Between the beginning of 1945 and November 1946, US 80/SR 22 were then shown to travel east on 14th Street in Columbus to US 27/SR 1/SR 103 (4th Avenue), turned right onto 4th Avenue and traveled to the south, turned left onto 11th Street and traveled to the east, turned right onto 8th Avenue and traveled south for one block, turned left, and resumed its former path.

=== 1950s to 1980s ===
Between April 1949 and August 1950, the path of US 80/SR 22 in Columbus was changed. They traveled east on 14th Street to US 27/SR 1/SR 103 (4th Avenue), turned right onto 4th Avenue and traveled to the south, turned left onto 13th Street and traveled to the east, turned right onto 13th Avenue and traveled to the south, and curved to the southeast, before resuming the former path. At this time, US 23 was designated on part of SR 22 in Macon. By the beginning of 1952, US 80/SR 22 were then shown to travel east on 14th Street in Columbus to US 27/SR 1/SR 103 (4th Avenue), turned right onto 4th Avenue and traveled to the south, turned left onto 11th Street and traveled to the east, turned right onto 6th Avenue and traveled to the south for one block, turned left onto 10th Street and traveled to the east, turned right onto 10th Avenue and traveled to the south for one block, and turned left onto Wynnton Road to resume former path. Between June 1955 and July 1957, US 80/SR 22 were then shown to travel east on 14th Street to US 27/SR 1/SR 85/SR 103 (4th Avenue), turned right onto 4th Avenue and traveled to the south, turned left onto 13th Street and traveled to the east, turned right onto 13th Avenue and traveled to the south, and curved to the southeast, before resuming the former path. By June 1960, the entire length of SR 22 was paved. Between June 1963 and the beginning of 1966, the path of US 80 from the central part of Columbus to northeast of the city was shifted northward, off of SR 22 and onto US 27/SR 1/SR 85/SR 103 and then US 27 Alt./SR 85. In 1967, the path of US 80 from the Alabama state line to 4th Avenue was shifted southward, off of SR 22 and onto US 280/SR 1 Spur and US 27/SR 1. The path of SR 22 in the Macon area was split in two, from east-southeast of Lizella to the southern part of Macon. SR 22 was projected and under construction on a southern path from US 80 to SR 49. SR 22 Conn. followed the former path on US 80 from the western point to just east of the I-475 interchange, with SR 74 following the former path, also on US 80, to downtown. SR 22 resumed its path on SR 49 and then US 41 Bus./SR 11. The next year, this new path of SR 22 was completed from US 80 to US 41/SR 247 (Pio Nono Avenue). It was still projected from there to SR 49. In 1971, SR 22 in the Macon area was completed to SR 49. US 80 was shifted onto the entire length of the newer path of SR 22. In 1983, SR 22's western terminus was truncated to the US 27 Alt./US 80/SR 1/SR 85 interchange. SR 22 was proposed on a farther northern path (its current path) from the Alabama state line to this interchange. The former path from 4th Avenue to the northeast was redesignated as a southwestern extension of SR 22 Spur. The former path from the Alabama state line to 4th Avenue was redesignated as part of SR 85/SR 219. At this time, a western bypass of Crawfordville, designated as SR 741, was proposed from SR 22 southwest of the city to SR 22 northwest of it. In 1985, the path of SR 22 in Columbus was completed from SR 22 Spur to I-185. The path of SR 22 in Crawfordville was shifted westward, replacing the proposed path of SR 741. In 1987, the path of SR 22 in Columbus was completed from I-185 to a point east of the US 27/SR 1 interchange.

== Future ==
The section from the Alabama state line to Geneva is part of the Fall Line Freeway and could be included in the proposed I-14.

== Major intersections ==
County	Location	mi	km	Exit	Destinations	Notes
Chattahoochee River		0.000	0.000		US 80 west (SR 8 west) / SR 540 begins (Fall Line Freeway) – Phenix City, Montgomery	Western terminus; western end of US 80 and SR 540/Fall Line Freeway concurrencies; continuation into Alabama
Muscogee	Columbus	0.613	0.987	1	SR 22 Conn. to SR 85 – Downtown Columbus	Northern terminus of SR 22 Conn.
Muscogee	Columbus	1.310	2.108	2	SR 219 (River Road)	
Muscogee	Columbus	2.488	4.004	3	Bradley Park Drive	Diverging diamond interchange
Muscogee	Columbus	3.780	6.083	4	I-185 (SR 411) / US 27 / SR 1 (Veterans Parkway) – Fort Benning, Atlanta	I-185/SR 411 exit 10
Muscogee	Columbus	5.885	9.471	5	Moon Road	Eastbound exit is combined with exit 4.
Muscogee	Columbus	7.124	11.465	6	Schomburg Road / Blackmon Road	
Muscogee	Columbus	9.452	15.212		Flat Rock Road	Eastern end of J.R. Allen Parkway
Muscogee	Columbus	9.812	15.791		US 27 Alt. / SR 85 – Manchester, Columbus	Interchange
Muscogee	Columbus	11.367	18.293		SR 22 Spur west (Macon Road)	Eastern terminus of SR 22 Spur
Talbot		26.161	42.102		SR 355 south – Buena Vista, Cusseta	Northern terminus of SR 355
Talbot		28.881	46.479		SR 41 south – Buena Vista, Oakland	Western end of SR 41 concurrency
Talbot	Geneva	29.691	47.783		SR 96 east / SR 540 east (Fall Line Freeway east) to SR 240 east – Junction City	Eastern end of SR 540/Fall Line Freeway concurrency; western terminus of SR 96
Talbot	Talbotton	36.927	59.428		SR 90 east / SR 208 east (Clark Street) – Junction City	Western end of SR 208 concurrency; western terminus of SR 90
Talbot	Talbotton	37.130	59.755		SR 208 west (Monroe Street) – Waverly Hall	Eastern end of SR 208 concurrency
Talbot	Talbotton	37.359	60.123		SR 41 north (North Washington Avenue) – Manchester, Warm Springs, Woodland	Eastern end of SR 41 concurrency
Taylor		56.101	90.286		US 19 south / SR 3 south – Butler, Americus	Western end of US 19/SR 3 concurrency
Flint River		56.758	91.343	Garland T. Byrd Bridge		
Upson		58.178	93.628		US 19 north / SR 3 north – Thomaston	Eastern end of US 19/SR 3 concurrency
Crawford	Roberta	71.484	115.042		US 341 / SR 7 / SR 42 north – Barnesville, Fort Valley	Western end of SR 42 concurrency
Crawford	Knoxville	72.471	116.631		SR 42 south – Byron	Eastern end of SR 42 concurrency
Echeconnee Creek		82.106	132.137	Bridge at the Crawford–Bibb county line		
Bibb		88.896	143.064		Fulton Mill Road – Central State Prison, Ed DeFore Sports Complex	Former SR 361
Bibb	Macon	90.654	145.893		I-475 (SR 408) – Atlanta, Valdosta	I-475/SR 408 exit 3
Bibb	Macon	94.435	151.978		US 41 / SR 247 (Pio Nono Avenue) – Forsyth, Warner Robins	
Bibb	Macon	94.841	152.632		I-75 (SR 401) / SR 540 (Fall Line Freeway) – Atlanta, Valdosta	I-75/SR 401 exit 162
Bibb	Macon	95.762	154.114		US 41 Bus. south / US 129 south / SR 11 south / SR 49 south (Broadway)	Western end of US 41 Bus./SR 49 and US 129/SR 11 concurrencies
Bibb	Macon	97.722	157.268		US 80 east / US 129 north / SR 11 north (Martin Luther King Jr. Boulevard)	Eastern end of US 80 and US 129/SR 11 concurrencies
Bibb	Macon	98.048	157.793		US 41 Bus. north / SR 49 north (Walnut Street)	Eastern end of US 41 Bus./SR 49 concurrency
Bibb	Macon	98.162	157.976		US 129 south / SR 11 south / SR 87 south (Riverside Drive)	Westbound exit only; interchange
Bibb	Macon	98.250	158.118	Carl Vinson Memorial Bridge over the Ocmulgee River		
Bibb	Macon	98.371	158.313		I-16 (Jim L. Gillis Historic Savannah Parkway / SR 404) / SR 540 (Fall Line Freeway)	I-16/SR 404 exit 1B westbound; only ramp is an exit from westbound I-16/SR 404/SR 540
Bibb	Macon	98.769	158.953		US 23 / US 129 Alt. south / SR 19 (Emery Highway) to I-16 (SR 404 / SR 540) – Forsyth, Jeffersonville, Savannah, Coliseum	Western end of US 129 Alt. concurrency
Bibb	Macon	99.020	159.357		US 129 south / SR 11 south / SR 49 south (Gray Highway)	Eastern end of US 129 Alt. concurrency; western end of US 129, SR 11, and SR 49 concurrencies; no left turn northbound
Bibb	Macon	99.643	160.360		SR 49 north (Shurling Drive) – Milledgeville	Eastern end of SR 49 concurrency
Jones	Gray	109.336	175.959		SR 18 east (Gray Highway) – Gordon	Western end of SR 18 concurrency
Jones	Gray	109.643	176.453		SR 18 west – Forsyth	Eastern end of SR 18 concurrency
Jones	Gray	113.332	182.390		SR 11 north (Atlanta Road) – Monticello	Eastern end of SR 11 concurrency
Jones	Gray	114.412	184.128		US 129 north / SR 44 (James Street) – Eatonton, Gordon	Eastern end of US 129 concurrency
Baldwin	Milledgeville	131.092	210.972		SR 212 west – Monticello	Eastern terminus of SR 212
Baldwin	Milledgeville	131.406	211.477		US 441 / SR 29 (Roberson Mill Road) – Eatonton, Irwinton, Dublin, Georgia College Athletic Complex, Georgia Veterans Memorial Cemetery	
Baldwin	Milledgeville	133.441	214.752		US 441 Bus. north / SR 24 north / SR 29 Bus. north (North Columbia Street) to US 441 north / SR 24 north – Eatonton	Western end of US 441 Bus./SR 29 Bus. and SR 24 concurrencies
Baldwin	Milledgeville	133.539	214.910		US 441 Bus. south / SR 29 Bus. south (North Clarke Street) – Irwinton	Eastern end of US 441 Bus./SR 29 Bus. concurrency
Baldwin	Milledgeville	134.242	216.042		SR 49 south (East Hancock Street) / South Elbert Street south – Georgia Veterans Memorial Cemetery, Central State Hospital, Oconee River Greenway and Riverwalk	Northern terminus of SR 49; former SR 22 Conn./SR 24 Conn.; former northern terminus of SR 112
Baldwin	Milledgeville	134.792	216.927	Bobby Parham Bridge over the Oconee River		
Baldwin		138.330	222.621		SR 24 south – Sandersville	Eastern end of SR 24 concurrency
Hancock	Sparta	157.314	253.172		SR 15 south / SR 16 east (Broad Street) – Sandersville, Warrenton	Western end of SR 15 and SR 16 concurrencies
Hancock		158.014	254.299		SR 16 west – Eatonton	Eastern end of SR 16 concurrency
Hancock		160.028	257.540		SR 15 north – Greensboro, Athens	Eastern end of SR 15 concurrency
Taliaferro		178.609	287.443		I-20 (SR 402) – Atlanta, Augusta	I-20/SR 402 exit 148
Taliaferro	Crawfordville	180.521	290.520		US 278 / SR 12 (Broad Street) to SR 47 – Union Point, Crawfordville, Washington	
Taliaferro		188.397	303.196		SR 44 (Union Point Road) – Union Point, Washington, Greensboro, Elberton, Kettle Creek Battlefield Historic Site	
Oglethorpe		206.538	332.391		US 78 east / SR 10 east (Washington Road) – Washington	Western end of US 78/SR 10 concurrency
Oglethorpe	Lexington	207.712	334.280		SR 77 north (Elberton Road) – Elberton, Hartwell, Lake R.B. Russell State Park	Western end of SR 77 concurrency
Oglethorpe	Lexington	208.295	335.218		SR 77 south (Union Point Road) – Union Point, Siloam, Woodville	Eastern end of SR 77 concurrency
Oglethorpe	Lexington	208.599	335.708		US 78 west / SR 10 west (Athens Road) – Athens, Atlanta	Eastern end of US 78/SR 10 concurrency
Madison	Comer	222.663	358.341		SR 72 Former (E Sunset Ave) – Carlton	Eastern end of SR 72 Former concurrency
Madison	Comer	222.759	358.496		SR 72 Former (W Sunset Ave) – Comer	Western end of SR 72 Former concurrency
Madison	Comer	223.454	359.614		SR 72 (Comer Bypass) / SR 98 north – Commerce, Elberton	Eastern terminus; southern terminus of SR 98
1.000 mi = 1.609 km; 1.000 km = 0.621 mi: Concurrency terminus; Incomplete access

== Special routes ==
=== Columbus connector route ===
State Route 22 Connector
- Location: Columbus
- Length: 0.3 mi (480 m)
- Existed: 1985–present

State Route 22 Connector (SR 22 Conn.) is a 0.3-mile-long (0.48 km) connector route of SR 22 that exists entirely within the city limits of Columbus in the west central part of Muscogee County. It is known as 2nd Avenue for its entire length.

It begins at an intersection with SR 85. It travels due north, curves to the north-northeast, and meets its northern terminus, an interchange with US 80/SR 22/SR 540 (J.R. Allen Parkway/Fall Line Freeway).

All of SR 22 Conn. is included as part of the National Highway System, a system of roadways important to the nation's economy, defense, and mobility.

In 1983, SR 22 Conn. was proposed from SR 85 north-northwest to what is now the path of US 80/SR 22. In 1985, SR 22 Conn. was completed on its proposed path.

The entire route is in Columbus, Muscogee County.

mi	km	Destinations	Notes
0.0	0.0	SR 85 (2nd Avenue / Manchester Expressway) – Columbus, Manchester, Columbus Technical College, St. Theatre of Georgia, Springer Opera House	Southern terminus
0.3	0.48	US 80 / SR 22 / SR 540 (J.R. Allen Parkway / Fall Line Freeway) to I-185 (SR 411) – Phenix City, Montgomery, Atlanta, Macon	Northern terminus; US 80/SR 22/SR 540, exit 1
1.000 mi = 1.609 km; 1.000 km = 0.621 mi

=== Columbus spur route ===
State Route 22 Spur
- Location: Columbus
- Length: 10.3 mi (16.6 km)
- Existed: 1965–present

State Route 22 Spur (SR 22 Spur) is a 10.3-mile-long (16.6 km) spur route of SR 22 that exists entirely within the city limits of Columbus in the west-central and north-central parts of Muscogee County.

It begins at an intersection with US 27/SR 1 (Veterans Parkway). It travels due east on 13th Street. It turns right onto 13th Avenue and curves to the northeast onto Wynnton Road. Then, it takes on the name Macon Road and has an interchange with Interstate 185 (I-185; Lindsay Creek Bypass). Farther to the northeast, it skirts along the southern edge of Parkhill Cemetery. Just after traveling northwest of Fort Benning, it meets its eastern terminus, an intersection with US 80/SR 22/SR 540 (Beaver Run Road/Fall Line Freeway).

All of SR 22 Spur is included as part of the National Highway System, a system of roadways important to the nation's economy, defense, and mobility.

Between June 1963 and the beginning of 1966, it was established on US 80 from the northern terminus of SR 357 to SR 22 northeast of Columbus. In 1983, the western terminus of the SR 22 mainline was truncated to the US 27 Alt./US 80/SR 1/SR 85 interchange northeast of downtown. The former path of SR 22 from US 27/SR 1 in downtown to US 80 was redesignated as a southwestern extension of SR 22 Spur.

The entire route is in Columbus, Muscogee County.

mi	km	Destinations	Notes
0.0	0.0	US 27 / SR 1 (Veterans Parkway)	Western terminus
3.2	5.1	I-185 (Lindsay Creek Bypass / SR 411) – Ft. Benning, Atlanta	I-185/SR 411 exit 6
10.3	16.6	US 80 / SR 22 / SR 540 (Beaver Run Road / Fall Line Freeway) – Phenix City, AL, Macon	Eastern terminus
1.000 mi = 1.609 km; 1.000 km = 0.621 mi

=== Salem spur route ===
State Route 22 Spur
- Location: Salem
- Existed: 1963–1999

State Route 22 Spur (SR 22 Spur) was a short spur route of SR 22 that partially existed in Salem, in the southern part of Upson County. Between June 1960 and June 1963, it was established from US 19/SR 3 southwest of Salem east-northeast over Auchumpkee Creek to US 80/SR 22 in the community. In 1999, this spur route was decommissioned.

The entire route was in Upson County.

Location	mi	km	Destinations	Notes
			US 19 / SR 3	Western terminus
Salem			US 80 / SR 22	Eastern terminus
1.000 mi = 1.609 km; 1.000 km = 0.621 mi

=== Macon connector route ===
State Route 22 Connector
- Location: Macon
- Existed: 1967–1981

State Route 22 Connector (SR 22 Conn.) was a connector route of SR 22 that existed partially in Macon. In 1967, the path of SR 22 in the Macon area was split in two, from east-southeast of Lizella to the southern part of Macon. The mainline route was projected and under construction on a more southern path from US 80 to SR 49. SR 22 Conn. followed the former path on US 80 from the western terminus to just east of the Interstate 475 (I-475) interchange. In 1971, US 80 was shifted off of SR 22 Conn. and onto SR 22. In 1981, SR 22 Conn. was decommissioned.

The entire route was in Bibb County.

Location	mi	km	Destinations	Notes
			US 80 / SR 22	Western terminus
Macon			I-475 (SR 408)	
Macon			SR 74	Eastern terminus
1.000 mi = 1.609 km; 1.000 km = 0.621 mi

=== Milledgeville connector route ===
State Route 22 Connector
- Location: Milledgeville
- Existed: 1972–1995

State Route 22 Connector (SR 22 Conn.) was a connector route of SR 22 that existed entirely within the city limits of Milledgeville. In 1972, it and SR 24 Conn. was established on Franklin Street and Elbert Street from US 441/SR 29 to SR 22/SR 24/SR 49. Between the beginning of 1986 and the beginning of 1996, US 441/SR 29 were shifted west of the city. The former path was redesignated as US 441 Bus./SR 243. At this time, both SR 22 Conn. and SR 24 Conn. were decommissioned.

The entire route was in Milledgeville, Baldwin County.

mi	km	Destinations	Notes
		US 441 / SR 29 (South Wayne Street / Franklin Street) / SR 24 Conn. begins	Western end of SR 24 Conn. concurrency; western terminus of SR 22 Conn. and SR 24 Conn.
		SR 112 south (South Elbert Street)	Northern terminus of SR 112
		SR 22 / SR 24 (Elbert Street / East Hancock Street) / SR 49 south (East Hancock Street) / SR 24 Conn. ends	Eastern end of SR 24 Conn. concurrency; eastern terminus of SR 22 Conn. and SR 24 Conn.; northern terminus of SR 49
1.000 mi = 1.609 km; 1.000 km = 0.621 mi: Concurrency terminus
