= Georgia State Route 315 =

Highway in Georgia, United States

State Route 315
- Georgia State Route 315 highlighted in red

Route information
- Maintained by GDOT
- Length: 29.8 mi (48.0 km)

Major junctions
- West end: SR 219 in Piney Grove
- I-185 west-northwest of Cataula; US 27 / SR 1 in Cataula; US 27 Alt. / SR 85 in Ellerslie
- East end: SR 208 in Olive Branch

Location
- Country: United States
- State: Georgia
- Counties: Harris, Talbot

Highway system
- Georgia State Highway System; Interstate; US; State; Special
← SR 314	→ SR 316

State Route 315 (SR 315) is a 29.8-mile-long (48.0 km) east-west state highway in the west-central part of the U.S. state of Georgia. The highway travels from SR 219 at Goat Rock Road in southwestern Harris County to SR 208 in Olive Branch, west of Talbotton, in west-central Talbot County.

== Route description ==
SR 315 begins at an intersection with SR 219 in Piney Grove, in rural southwestern Harris County. At this intersection, the roadway continues to the southwest as Goat Rock Road. SR 315 travels to the northeast and immediately curves to the north-northeast. It curves back to the northeast to an interchange with Interstate 185 (I-185; Chet Atkins Parkway). The route then gradually curves to a roughly eastward direction, traveling through Mulberry Grove. After that, it curves to the south, to a very brief concurrency with US 27/SR 1 in Cataula. East of town, at the intersection with the southern terminus of Lynn Drive and the southwestern terminus of Denney Road, next to Clowers Cemetery, SR 315 turns right and travels to the south-southeast. Southwest of Ellerslie, the highway intersects the northern terminus of Old Warm Springs Road. It turns left onto Warm Springs Road and travels north-northeast for approximately 400 feet (120 m). It curves to the northeast and then to the east-southeast and intersects US 27 Alt./SR 85 (Manchester Expressway). The three highways travel concurrently to the north-northeast and enter Ellerslie. At the intersection with Talbotton Road, the highway turns right, to the southeast, and very gradually curves to the northeast, and traveling through Ridgeway, before it enters Talbot County. There, it travels through Baughville, before meeting its eastern terminus, an intersection with SR 208 (Tuck Persons Highway) in Olive Branch, west of Talbotton.

The only segment of SR 315 that is part of the National Highway System, a system of roadways important to the nation's economy, defense, and mobility, is the part that is concurrent with US 27/SR 1 in Cataula.

== Major intersections ==
County	Location	mi	km	Destinations	Notes
Harris	Piney Grove	0.0	0.0	SR 219 / Goat Rock Road west – Columbus, LaGrange	Western terminus of SR 315; eastern terminus of Goat Rock Road
Harris		4.3	6.9	I-185 (Chet Atkins Parkway / SR 411) – Columbus, LaGrange	I-185 exit 19
Harris	Cataula	12.0	19.3	US 27 north / SR 1 north (Hamilton Road) – Pine Mountain	Western end of US 27/SR 1 concurrency
Harris	Cataula	12.1	19.5	US 27 south / SR 1 south – Columbus	Eastern end of US 27/SR 1 concurrency
Harris	Ellerslie	17.1	27.5	US 27 Alt. south / SR 85 south (Manchester Expressway)	Western end of US 27 Alt./SR 85 concurrency
Harris	Ellerslie	17.6	28.3	US 27 Alt. north / SR 85 north	Eastern end of US 27 Alt./SR 85 concurrency
Talbot	Olive Branch	29.8	48.0	SR 208 (Tuck Persons Highway) – Waverly Hall, Talbotton	Eastern terminus
1.000 mi = 1.609 km; 1.000 km = 0.621 mi: Concurrency terminus
