= Georgia State Route 36 =

State highway in Georgia

State Route 36
- SR 36 highlighted in red

Route information
- Maintained by GDOT
- Length: 95.2 mi (153.2 km)
- Existed: 1941–present

Major junctions
- West end: SR 208 east of Waverly Hall
- US 19 / SR 3 / SR 74 in Thomaston; US 41 / SR 7 / SR 18 in Barnesville; I-75 southwest of Jackson; US 23 / SR 16 / SR 42 in Jackson
- East end: US 278 / SR 12 / SR 142 in Covington

Location
- Country: United States
- State: Georgia
- Counties: Harris, Talbot, Upson, Lamar, Butts, Newton

Highway system
- Georgia State Highway System; Interstate; US; State; Special
← SR 35	→ SR 37

State Route 36 (SR 36) is a 95.2-mile-long (153.2 km) state highway that travels southwest-to-northeast through portions of Harris, Talbot, Upson, Lamar, Butts, and Newton counties in the central part of the U.S. state of Georgia. The highways connects the Waverly Hall area with Covington, via Thomaston, Barnesville, and Jackson.

== Route description ==
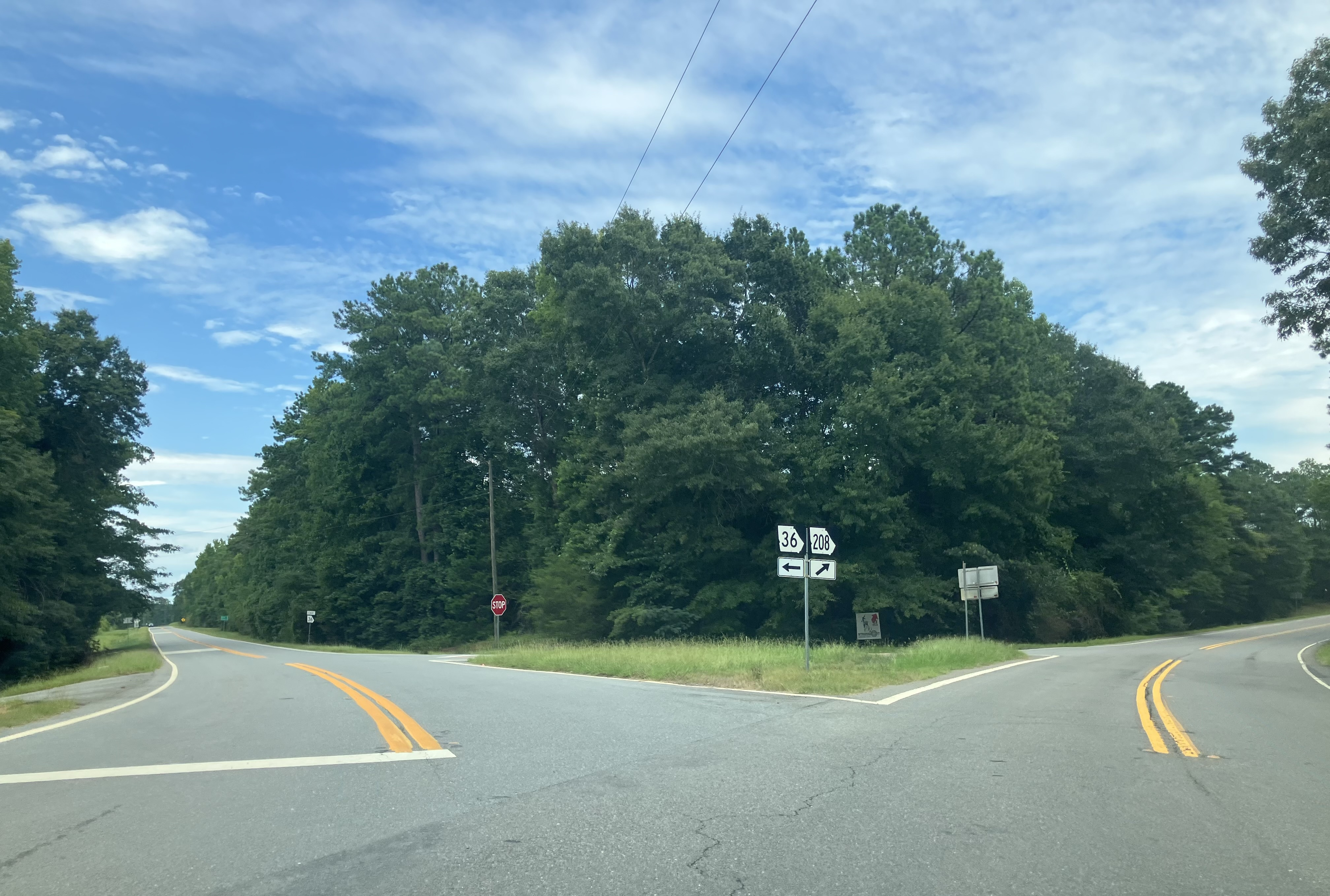
The western terminus of SR 36 at SR 208 near Waverly Hall

SR 36 begins at an intersection with SR 208 about 4,000 feet (1,200 m) east of Waverly Hall and just west of the Harris–Talbot county line. Almost immediately, it crosses into Talbot County and travels in a fairly northeasterly direction, before curving to the east-northeast to meet SR 41 in Greens Mill. The two highways head concurrently to the north into Woodland, where they diverge. SR 36 continues to the east-northeast and crosses over the Flint River on the Wynns Bridge into Upson County, in Pleasant Hill. The highway travels through rural areas of the county and enters Thomaston. There, it curves to the north and begins a concurrency with SR 74 (West Gordon Street). The two highways turn to the right and intersect US 19/SR 3. After that, the two highways diverge, with SR 36 continuing to the northeast. Just before McKinney, it passes by Lake Julia, Lake Maude, and Bickley Lake. Just south of The Rock, it has an eastward slide in its routing. Approximately 3 miles (4.8 km) later, it crosses into Lamar County. In the southwestern part of Barnesville, the highway intersects US 41/SR 7/SR 18. The four highways head concurrently to the west and curve to a fairly northerly routing. At Rose Avenue, SR 18 splits off to the west, while the other highways very briefly travel along the Barnesville–Aldora city line, before re-entering Barnesville proper. After leaving town, SR 36 splits off onto Liz Acres Road. It travels through rural areas of the county and then enters Butts County. Almost immediately is an interchange with Interstate 75 (I-75) at exit 201. Northeast of there, the highway crosses over the Towaliga River on the David P. Ridgeway Bridge, before entering Jackson, where it has a brief concurrency with US 23/SR 16/SR 42 (3rd Street). Then, it travels to the west of Hickory Hills Golf Course. To the northeast is a crossing of Tussahaw Creek. Then, it crosses over the South River into Newton County. Then, it meets the southern terminus of SR 162 and crosses over the Yellow River. Just before its intersection with SR 212, it begins to curve to the north. SR 36 enters Covington, where it intersects the Covington Bypass. Here, it turns to the right, where it follows the bypass until it meets its eastern terminus, an intersection with US 278/SR 12/SR 142 in the northeastern part of the city.

== History ==
The roadway that would eventually become SR 36 was established in 1930 as SR 72 from US 19/SR 3 north-northwest of Thomaston to SR 18 in Barnesville. Later that year, the western terminus was shifted southward into Thomaston. At the end of 1933, SR 72 was extended northeast to Jackson. A few months later, it was extended again, this time north-northeast to Covington. Three years later, the entire length of the Thomaston–Barnesville segment had a "completed hard surface". Later that year, SR 72 was extended southwest to SR 41 in Woodland. The next year, the then-eastern terminus was under construction. By the middle of 1939, the then-western terminus had a completed hard surface. At this time, the then-eastern terminus had a "sand clay or top soil" surface. Near the end of 1940, SR 72 was extended north-northwest along SR 41 to Manchester and then west-northwest to SR 85 in Warm Springs. It was possibly also extended west-southwest to US 27/SR 1 in Pine Mountain, but this segment of highway was not designated as any highway. The entire extension had a completed hard surface. Meanwhile, the then-eastern terminus was under construction. By the end of the year, the then-eastern terminus had a completed hard surface. A few months later, the entire Newton County portion that didn't have a hard surface was under construction. By the end of 1941, the entire highway was redesignated as SR 36. The Newton County portion that didn't have a hard surface had completed grading, but was not surfaced. In 1943, the portion of SR 36 west of SR 41 was shifted southward to end at SR 208 east of Waverly Hall, as the highway currently does. The former path of the highway was redesignated as SR 190. Between 1946 and 1948, the Upson County portion of the Woodland–Thomaston segment, the Lamar County portion of the Barnesville–Jackson segment, and the portion of the highway in the vicinity of the SR 162 intersection northeast of Worthville, all had a "sand clay, top soil, or stabilized earth" surface. A year later, a portion of SR 36 north of Jackson also had a sand clay, top soil, or stabilized earth surface. By the end of 1950, nearly the entire Talbot County portion of the Woodland–Thomaston segment, and the central portion of the Butts County portion of the Jackson–Covington segment, were hard surfaced. The northern portion of this latter segment had completed grading, but was not surfaced. By 1952, a small portion west-southwest of Thomaston, as well as nearly all of the Butts County portion of the Jackson–Covington segment, were hard surfaced. In 1953, the entire Woodland–Thomaston and Jackson–Covington segments, as well as the Lamar County portion of the Barnesville–Jackson segment, were hard surfaced. The next year, the entire Butts County portion of the Barnesville–Jackson segment was hard surfaced. A few years later, a small portion south of Woodland was hard surfaced. Between 1957 and 1960, the entire segment from its western terminus to Woodland was hard surfaced. The highway remained fairly unchanged for over 50 years. Between 2011 and 2013, the eastern terminus was shifted eastward, onto the Covington Bypass.

== Major intersections ==
County	Location	mi	km	Destinations	Notes
Harris		0.0	0.0	SR 208 – Waverly Hall, Talbotton	Western terminus
Talbot		10.3	16.6	SR 41 south – Talbotton	Western end of SR 41 concurrency
Talbot	Woodland	12.1	19.5	SR 41 north (Manchester Highway) – Manchester	Eastern end of SR 41 concurrency
Flint River		22.3	35.9	Wynns Bridge; Talbot–Upson county line	
Upson	Thomaston	30.1	48.4	SR 74 west (West Gordon Street) – Woodbury	Western end of SR 74 concurrency
Upson	Thomaston	30.2	48.6	US 19 south / SR 3 south (Church Street) – Butler	One-way pair
Upson	Thomaston	30.2	48.6	US 19 north / SR 3 north (Center Street) – Zebulon	One-way pair
Upson	Thomaston	30.4	48.9	SR 74 east (East Main Street) – Yatesville	Eastern end of SR 74 concurrency
Lamar	Barnesville	45.6	73.4	US 41 south / SR 7 south / SR 18 east (Veterans Parkway) – Culloden, Forsyth	Western end of US 41/SR 7 and SR 18 concurrencies
Lamar	Barnesville	46.2	74.4	SR 18 west (Rose Avenue) – Zebulon	Eastern end of SR 18 concurrency
Lamar		48.6	78.2	US 41 / SR 7 north – Griffin	Eastern end of US 41/SR 7 concurrency
Butts		60.9	98.0	I-75 (SR 401) – Macon, Atlanta	I-75/SR 401 exit 201
Butts		62.0	99.8	David P. Ridgeway Bridge over the Towaliga River	
Butts	Jackson	69.5	111.8	US 23 / SR 42 north / SR 16 west (West 3rd Street) – Locust Grove, Griffin	Western end of US 23/SR 16/SR 42 concurrency
Butts	Jackson	69.8	112.3	US 23 south / SR 42 south / SR 16 east (East 3rd Street) – Macon, Monticello	Eastern end of US 23/SR 16/SR 42 concurrency
South River		79.0	127.1	Butts–Newton county line	
Newton		79.8	128.4	SR 162 north – Porterdale	Southern terminus of SR 162
Newton		80.3	129.2	Yellow River	
Newton		82.7	133.1	SR 212 – Monticello, Conyers	
Newton	Covington	95.2	153.2	US 278 / SR 12 / SR 142 – Conyers, Madison, Walnut Grove, Newborn	Eastern terminus
1.000 mi = 1.609 km; 1.000 km = 0.621 mi: Concurrency terminus

== In popular culture ==
Possibly in relation to SR 36's former northern terminus in Covington's town square, when later episodes of The Dukes of Hazzard were filmed on a set in California, crudely produced SR 36 route markers were displayed at an intersection near the Hazzard County Court House. In 1978, The Dukes of Hazzard filmed its first five episodes on location in Covington and nearby Conyers.

A SR 36 sign is visible in the Covington town square in the ninth minute of The Cannonball Run.

A SR 36 sign is visible in the series In the Heat of the Night in part two of the first episode of Season 2.
