= Interstate 185 (Georgia) =

Highway in Georgia

Interstate 185
- Chet Atkins Parkway
- I-185 highlighted in red

Route information
- Auxiliary route of I-85
- Maintained by GDOT
- Length: 49.3 mi (79.3 km)
- Existed: 1979–present
- Tourist routes: I-185 Scenic Byway
- NHS: Entire route

Major junctions
- South end: Lindsey Creek Parkway in Fort Benning
- US 27 / US 280 / SR 1 / SR 520 in Columbus; US 27 Alt. / SR 85 in Columbus; US 80 / SR 22 / SR 540 in Columbus; US 27 / SR 1 southeast of LaGrange
- North end: I-85 east of LaGrange

Location
- Country: United States
- State: Georgia
- Counties: Muscogee, Harris, Troup

Highway system
- Interstate Highway System; Main; Auxiliary; Suffixed; Business; Future; Georgia State Highway System; Interstate; US; State; Special
← SR 184	→ SR 185
← US 411	→ SR 412

Interstate 185 (I-185) is a 49.3-mile-long (79.3 km) auxiliary Interstate Highway in the west-central part of the US state of Georgia. I-185 also carries the unsigned State Route 411 (SR 411) and is named the Chet Atkins Parkway for its entire length. It provides a freeway connection between Columbus and I-85, which continues on to the Atlanta metropolitan area.

== Route description ==
=== Muscogee County ===
Interstate 185 in Columbus looking north towards its interchange with Manchester Expressway

I-185 begins just north of Fort Benning in the southwestern part of Columbus, which is consolidated with Muscogee County. It starts off as a northern extension of Lindsey Creek Parkway which enters Fort Benning immediately to the south of I-185's southern terminus. Almost immediately northeast of its southern terminus, it has an interchange with US Route 27 (US 27)/US 280/SR 1/SR 520 (Victory Drive). The Interstate curves to the north-northwest. It passes Benning Hills Park and the Calhoun Tract before curving to the north-northeast. It crosses over Cusseta Road and some railroad tracks of Georgia Southwestern Railroad. It curves to the north-northwest and has an interchange with St. Marys Road. It curves to a due north direction and has an interchange with Buena Vista Road. The highway curves to the northwest and crosses over Bull Creek. It then has an interchange with SR 22 Spur (Macon Road). Here, it passes the Cross Country Plaza shopping center. I-185 crosses over Lindsey Creek and then begins to parallel the creek. Upon crossing over College Drive, Lindsey Creek veers away from the Interstate. The highway then travels between Hardaway High School and Columbus State University. After crossing beneath the Fall Line Trace, it has an interchange with US 27 Alternate (US 27 Alt)/SR 85 (Manchester Expressway). It then has an interchange with the Airport Thruway, which leads to Columbus Airport. After the highway begins to curve to the north, it travels under a bridge that carries US 27/SR 1. It crosses over some railroad tracks of Norfolk Southern Railway. Almost immediately is a cloverleaf interchange with collector/distributor roads with US 80/SR 22/SR 540 (J.R. Allen Parkway), a limited-access bypass of Columbus to its north. Within this interchange, it crosses over Roaring Branch. It curves to the north and has an interchange with Williams Road. The interchange with Williams Road is the southern limit of the I-185 Scenic Byway. I-185 retains this scenic designation thru to its northern terminus and is reduced to two lanes in each direction for the remainder of its course as well. Continuing on, I-185 curves to the north-northeast and has an interchange with Smith Road. Within this interchange, it crosses over Heiferhorn Creek. At the northern end of this interchange, the highway leaves the city limits of Columbus and enters Harris County.

=== Harris County ===
I-185 curves to the northwest and crosses over Standing Boy Creek. It curves to the north-northwest and has an interchange with SR 315. It crosses over Mulberry Creek and curves to the northwest. It winds its way to the north-northeast, traveling parallel to SR 219. It crosses over Little Creek just to the west of Peterson Lake and just south of an interchange with SR 116. The highway winds its way to the north and crosses over Mountain Oak Creek. At an interchange with Hopewell Church Road, SR 219 turns away from the Interstate. I-185 curves to the northeast and crosses over House Creek Tributary. It then has an interchange with SR 18. After it crosses over Ingram Creek, the highway parallels the creek briefly and then enters Troup County.

=== Troup County ===
I-185 curves to the north-northeast and crosses over Turkey Creek. It then crosses over Polecat Creek before curving to the north-northwest. It then crosses over Flat Shoals Creek. It curves to the north-northeast and has another interchange with US 27/SR 1 (Martha Berry Highway). The highway then crosses over Mud Creek. It curves to the north-northwest and crosses over Panther Creek. After curving back to the north-northeast, it has an interchange with Big Springs Road. It curves back to the north-northwest and crosses over some railroad tracks of CSX Transportation on the southeastern edge of LaGrange. The highway begins to skirt along the eastern edge of the city. It crosses over Long Cane Creek and then curves to the north-northeast again. It leaves the city limits of LaGrange and travels under a bridge that carries SR 109. It then meets its northern terminus, an interchange with I-85.

=== National Highway System ===
The entire length of I-185 is part of the National Highway System, a system of routes determined to be the most important for the nation's economy, mobility, and defense.

== History ==
In 1966, the highway that would eventually become I-185 was under construction from its current southern terminus to Buena Vista Road, which, at the time, was signed as SR 357. However, the highway was signed as SR 1, since the current SR 1 had been redesignated as SR 1 Business (SR 1 Bus). SR 1 was proposed from SR 357 to US 27/SR 1 Bus in the northern part of Columbus. The next year, this segment was open. It was under construction from SR 357 to US 27/SR 1 in the northern part of Columbus. In 1969, the highway was open from its southern terminus to the northern part of Columbus. In 1975, it was redesignated as I-185, since SR 1 Bus had been changed back to SR 1. The highway's northern extension was proposed from the northern part of Columbus to US 27/SR 1 southeast of LaGrange. It was under construction from that interchange to I-85. The next year, the entire northern extension was under construction. In 1978, it was opened from US 27/SR 1 to Smith Road in the northern part of Columbus. It was also open from US 27/SR 1 southeast of LaGrange to I-85. In 1979, I-185 was open for its entire length.

The portions of I-185 north of exit 8 were equipped with callboxes as part of a pilot program in May 1999. It was the only stretch of Interstate Highway in Georgia to be so equipped. With the widespread proliferation of cellular phone service and usage, the emergency callboxes were removed from I-185 around 2015.

In 2006, business and government officials in Southwest Georgia began a campaign to have the Interstate extended to Monticello, Florida, and connect with I-10. The proposed route of the highway would travel parallel to SR 520 (known as "Corridor Z") to Albany and then parallel to US 19. Local opposition to the plan soon emerged. Critics argued that the proposed Interstate would siphon business from small towns that the new road bypassed. In 2009, the Georgia Department of Transportation (GDOT) concluded a two-year study of the proposal, which found that extending I-185 would "be inconsistent with existing comprehensive land use plans; would have a negative impact on prime agricultural land, forests and cultural assets; and could have a detrimental impact on poverty and minority populations". GDOT announced it would instead focus on upgrading and improving other key arterial highways in southwest Georgia, including SR 133 between Albany and Valdosta.

The majority of I-185 is designated as the I-185 Scenic Byway. The scenic designation for the route was proposed by agencies and citizens in all three counties along the interstate in 2005. This interest led to a meeting in Columbus in January 2006 where the process of applying for the designation by GDOT began. GDOT granted the highway the I-185 Scenic Byway status in 2007 from the interchange with Williams Road to the interstate's northern terminus at I-85. A celebration of the designation was held on October 18, 2007 at the Williams Road Welcome Center. The section of I-185 that is a scenic byway has a restriction on the installation of billboards and is to be kept in natural state.

== Future ==
Currently, I-14, is proposed to go through Columbus, following the route of US 80/SR 22/SR 540, also known as the Fall Line Freeway. If this route is chosen, it would connect to I-185 at the existing interchange between I-185 and the Fall Line Freeway. Upgrades at this interchange may be required as a result, but no projects have been announced. The conversion of the Fall Line Freeway to I-14 would divert long-distance traffic off of I-185.

== Exit list ==
County	Location	mi	km	Old exit	New exit	Destinations	Notes
Muscogee	Columbus	0.00	0.00	–	–	Lindsey Creek Parkway south – Fort Benning	Southern terminus of I-185; northern terminus of Lindsey Creek Parkway
Muscogee	Columbus	0.00	0.00	1	1	US 27 / US 280 / SR 1 / SR 520 (Victory Drive) – Columbus, Cusseta, Albany	Split into exits 1A (south/east) and 1B (north/west)
Muscogee	Columbus	2.88	4.63	2	3	St. Marys Road	
Muscogee	Columbus	4.00	6.44	3	4	Buena Vista Road	
Muscogee	Columbus	5.58	8.98	4	6	SR 22 Spur (Macon Road)	
Muscogee	Columbus	7.33	11.80	5	7	US 27 Alt. / SR 85 (Manchester Expressway) – Columbus, Manchester	Signed as exits 7A and 7B northbound
Muscogee	Columbus	8.27	13.31	6	8	Airport Thruway – Columbus Airport	
Muscogee	Columbus	10.16	16.35	7	10	US 80 / SR 22 (J.R. Allen Parkway) / SR 540 (Fall Line Freeway) to US 27 / SR 1 – Macon, Phenix City Ala.	
Muscogee	Columbus	11.67	18.78	8	12	Williams Road – Welcome Center	
Muscogee	Columbus	14.30	23.01	9	14	Smith Road	
Harris	Mulberry Grove	18.89	30.40	10	19	SR 315 – Mulberry Grove	
Harris		25.47	40.99	11	25	SR 116 – Hamilton	
Harris	Whitesville	30.10	48.44	12	30	Hopewell Church Road – Whitesville	
Harris		34.17	54.99	13	34	SR 18 – Pine Mountain, West Point	
Troup		42.07	67.71	14	42	US 27 (SR 1 / Martha Berry Highway) – LaGrange, Pine Mountain	
Troup		45.67	73.50	15	46	Big Springs Road	
Troup		48.37– 49.22	77.84– 79.21	16	–	I-85 (SR 403) – Atlanta, Montgomery, LaGrange	Northern terminus of I-185; I-85 exit 21
1.000 mi = 1.609 km; 1.000 km = 0.621 mi
