= Georgia State Route 219 =

State highway in Georgia, United States

State Route 219
- Georgia State Route 219 highlighted in red

Route information
- Maintained by GDOT
- Length: 58.9 mi (94.8 km)

Major junctions
- South end: US 27 / SR 1 in Columbus
- US 80 / SR 22 / SR 540 in Columbus; I-85 south of LaGrange; US 27 / US 29 in LaGrange
- North end: SR 34 southwest of Franklin

Location
- Country: United States
- State: Georgia
- Counties: Muscogee, Harris, Troup, Heard

Highway system
- Georgia State Highway System; Interstate; US; State; Special
← SR 218	→ SR 220

State Route 219 (SR 219) is a 58.9-mile-long (94.8 km) state highway that runs south-to-north through portions of Muscogee, Harris, Troup, and Heard counties in the west-central part of the U.S. state of Georgia. It runs from Columbus north to a point southwest of Franklin.

== Route description ==
SR 219 begins at an intersection with US 27/SR 1 (Veterans Parkway) in Columbus in Muscogee County. It heads north-northwest to SR 85 (Manchester Expressway). Then, it curves to the northwest to an intersection with US 80/SR 22 (J.R. Allen Parkway). The highway heads through the rural northwestern part of the county and enters Harris County. A short distance after entering Harris County is an intersection with SR 315 in Piney Grove. SR 219 then heads northeast to begin paralleling Interstate 185 (I-185) for a while. During that stretch is an intersection with SR 103 and SR 116. After leaving I-185, SR 219 heads north to an intersection with SR 18 on the Harris–Troup county line. In Troup County, the highway heads through rural areas to its interchange with I-85 (Pearl Harbor Memorial Highway). It heads north, and enters LaGrange, where it meets US 27/SR 1. The three highways run concurrent for approximately 0.38 miles (0.61 km), until they meet US 29/SR 109. Here, US 29 joins the concurrency. One block later, SR 219 turns left onto SR 14 (Greenville Street), while US 27/US 29/SR 1/SR 14 continue to the north on N. Morgan Street. At Main Street, Greenville Street changes to Broad Street. SR 14/SR 219 continues to the west until they reach N. Greenwood Street, where SR 219 departs to the north, while SR 14 continues to the west on Broad Street. The highway departs LaGrange to the northwest, crosses over two sections of West Point Lake, and enters Heard County. In Heard County, SR 219 continues to the northwest. It passes through rural areas, and curves to the north. It then meets its northern terminus, an intersection with SR 34, southwest of Franklin.

SR 219 is not part of the National Highway System, a system of roadways important to the nation's economy, defense, and mobility.

== Major intersections ==
County	Location	mi	km	Destinations	Notes
Muscogee	Columbus	0.0	0.0	US 27 / SR 1 (Veterans Parkway)	Southern terminus
Muscogee	Columbus	0.8	1.3	SR 85 (Manchester Expressway) – Bibb City, Manchester	
Muscogee	Columbus	1.8	2.9	US 80 / SR 22 (J.R. Allen Parkway) / SR 540 (Fall Line Freeway) to I-185 – Phenix City, Downtown Columbus, Macon, Airport	US 80/SR 22/SR 540 exit 2
Harris	Piney Grove	10.1	16.3	SR 315 east to I-185 – Mulberry Grove	Western terminus of SR 315
Harris		20.0	32.2	SR 103 west / SR 116 east to I-185 – West Point, Hamilton	Eastern terminus of SR 103; western terminus of SR 116
Harris–Troup county line	Jones Crossroads	28.8	46.3	SR 18 to I-85 / I-185 – West Point, Pine Mountain	
Troup		37.3	60.0	I-85 (Pearl Harbor Memorial Highway / SR 403) – Montgomery, Atlanta	I-85 exit 13
Troup	LaGrange	40.4	65.0	US 27 south / SR 1 south (Hamilton Road)	Southern end of US 27/SR 1 concurrency
Troup	LaGrange	40.8	65.7	US 29 south (Vernon Street) / SR 109 (Vernon Street / Lafayette Parkway) – West Point, Greenville	Southern end of US 29 concurrency
Troup	LaGrange	40.9	65.8	US 27 north / SR 1 north / US 29 north / SR 14 north (North Morgan Street)	Northern end of US 27/SR 1 and US 29/SR 14 concurrencies; southern end of SR 14 Conn. concurrency
Troup	LaGrange	41.2	66.3	SR 14 Conn. south (Broad Street)	Northern end of SR 14 Conn. concurrency
Troup	LaGrange	45.6	73.4	West Point Lake	
Troup		48.7	78.4	West Point Lake	
Heard		58.9	94.8	SR 34 – Texas, Franklin	Northern terminus
1.000 mi = 1.609 km; 1.000 km = 0.621 mi: Concurrency terminus
