= Georgia State Route 173 =

State highway in Georgia, United States

State Route 173
- Raleigh Road
- SR 173 highlighted in red

Route information
- Maintained by GDOT
- Length: 4.95 mi (7.97 km)

Major junctions
- South end: SR 41 in Manchester
- North end: SR 85 Alt. in Raleigh

Location
- Country: United States
- State: Georgia
- Counties: Meriwether

Highway system
- Georgia State Highway System; Interstate; US; State; Special
← SR 172	→ SR 174

State Route 173 (SR 173) is a short 4.95-mile (7.97 km) state highway that runs south–north through Meriwether County, in the west-central part of the U.S. state of Georgia. The route is mostly straight except near its northern terminus.

== Route description ==
SR 173 begins at an intersection with SR 41 in the extreme northwestern corner of Manchester. It heads due north and curves to the northwest until it meets its northern terminus, an intersection with SR 85 Alternate in the unincorporated community of Raleigh.

== Major intersections ==
The entire route is in Meriwether County.

Location	mi	km	Destinations	Notes
Manchester	0.0	0.0	SR 41 (Roosevelt Highway) – Manchester, Warm Springs	Southern terminus
Raleigh	5.0	8.0	SR 85 Alt. (White House Parkway) – Warm Springs, Woodbury	Northern terminus
1.000 mi = 1.609 km; 1.000 km = 0.621 mi
