= Georgia State Route 208 =

State highway in Georgia, United States

State Route 208
- Georgia State Route 208 highlighted in red

Route information
- Maintained by GDOT
- Length: 43.2 mi (69.5 km)

Major junctions
- West end: US 27 / SR 1 near Hamilton
- US 27 Alt. / SR 85 in Waverly Hall; US 80 / SR 22 / SR 41 in Talbotton; US 19 / SR 3 north of Butler
- East end: SR 137 northeast of Butler

Location
- Country: United States
- State: Georgia
- Counties: Harris, Talbot, Taylor

Highway system
- Georgia State Highway System; Interstate; US; State; Special
← SR 207	→ SR 209

State Route 208 (SR 208) is a 43.2-mile-long (69.5 km) state highway located in the west-central part of the U.S. state of Georgia. It runs east from a point between Columbus and Hamilton. It passes through Harris County, Talbot County, and Taylor County.

== Route description ==
SR 208 begins at an intersection with US 27/SR 1, south-southeast of Hamilton. It heads southeast to Waverly Hall, where it intersects US 27 Alternate/SR 85 (Warm Springs Road). Northeast of Waverly Hall, it enters Talbot County and meets SR 36. About 5 miles (8.0 km) before entering Talbotton, it intersects SR 315 (Ellerslie Highway). In Talbotton, the road briefly runs concurrent with US 80/SR 22/SR 41. At the eastern end of the concurrency, SR 208 runs concurrent with SR 90. To the east, it enters Taylor County and intersects US 19/SR 3, north of Butler. SR 208 continues east to its eastern terminus at SR 137, northeast of Butler.

SR 208 is not part of the National Highway System, a system of roadways important to the nation's economy, defense, and mobility.

== Major intersections ==
County	Location	mi	km	Destinations	Notes
Harris		0.0	0.0	US 27 / SR 1 – Columbus, Pine Mountain	Western terminus
Harris	Waverly Hall	7.8	12.6	US 27 Alt. / SR 85 (Warm Springs Road) – Columbus, Manchester	
Talbot		9.6	15.4	SR 36 – Woodland	Southern terminus of SR 36
Talbot		15.6	25.1	SR 315 south (Ellerslie Highway) – Ellerslie	Northern terminus of SR 315
Talbot	Talbotton	19.8	31.9	US 80 east / SR 22 east / SR 41 north (Washington Avenue)	Western end of US 80/SR 22/SR 41 concurrency
Talbot	Talbotton	20.0	32.2	US 80 west / SR 22 west / SR 41 south (Washington Avenue) / SR 90	Eastern end of US 80/SR 22/SR 41 concurrency; western end of SR 90 concurrency
Talbot	Talbotton	20.6	33.2	SR 90 east (Clark Street) – Junction City	Eastern end of SR 90 concurrency
Taylor		38.7	62.3	US 19 / SR 3	
Taylor		43.2	69.5	SR 137 – Butler, Roberta	Eastern terminus
1.000 mi = 1.609 km; 1.000 km = 0.621 mi: Concurrency terminus
