= U.S. Route 27 Alternate (Georgia) =

Alternate highway route in Georgia, United States

U.S. Highway 27 Alternate

Route information
- Auxiliary route of US 27
- Maintained by GDOT
- Length: 94.118 mi (151.468 km)

Major junctions
- South end: US 27 / SR 1 / SR 85 in Columbus
- I-185 in Columbus; US 80 / SR 22 / SR 540 near Columbus; US 29 / SR 14 in Moreland; I-85 north of Moreland; US 29 / SR 14 in Newnan
- North end: US 27 / SR 1 / SR 16 / SR 166 in Carrollton

Location
- Country: United States
- State: Georgia
- Counties: Muscogee, Harris, Talbot, Meriwether, Coweta, Carroll

Highway system
- United States Numbered Highway System; List; Special; Divided; Georgia State Highway System; Interstate; US; State; Special

U.S. Highway 27 Alternate (US 27 Alt.) is an alternate route of US 27. It travels from the northwestern corner of Columbus northeast to just before Shiloh, north to Greenville, and northwest to Carrollton.

== Route description ==
The alternate route starts at an intersection with the US 27 mainline in Columbus in Muscogee County and initially runs northeast into Harris County, concurrent with State Route 85 (SR 85). Within Ellerslie, the route has a short concurrency with SR 315. The route splits from SR 85 south of Shiloh, on the Harris–Talbot county line, while moving onto SR 85 Alt. and briefly SR 116 before it cuts across the northwestern corner of Talbot County. It then enters Meriwether County, running along the southeastern edge of F. D. Roosevelt State Park while briefly crossing SR 190 and curving from the northwest to the northeast. Heading briefly northwest again through F. D. Roosevelt State Park this time and then north into Warm Springs, now cosigned with SR 41, the route turns north and heads into a traffic circle with SR 18 which joins US 27 Alt. through Greenville which leaves the concurrency at SR 109. Later, it runs through Luthersville where it intersects SR 54 before heading into Coweta County.

In Moreland, US 27 Alt. is joined by a concurrency with US 29, which also serves as the northern terminus of SR 41. Like its parent route, however, it joins the alternate in another concurrency. US 27 Alt./US 29/SR 14 serves as the main road through downtown Moreland, and, after passing by the Lewis Grizzard Museum, the Atlanta and West Point Railroad (AWP) main line moves to the west side of the road at a powerline right-of-way. It curves away from the tracks again at the intersection of "Old Highway 29", and, after winding around the northwestern edge of Newnan–Coweta County Airport, Interstate 85 (I-85) is encountered at a diamond interchange (exit 41). Just north of that interchange, it encounters the southern terminus of a concurrency with SR 16. Together, US 27 Alt./US 29/SR 14/SR 16 run through marshland around Pearl Springs Lake and East Newnan Lake as it enter Newnan. The routes cross over that AWP railroad line between Newnan South Industrial Road and Corinth Road. From there, it runs through the Greenville Street-LaGrange Street Historic District (signed as the Greenville-LaGrange Historic District), before passing the Coweta County Superior Courthouse and running over a bridge above a former Central of Georgia Railway line. Greenville Street ends at Salbide Avenue and US 27 Alt./US 29/SR 14/SR 16 becomes a one-way pair along Jefferson and LaGrange streets, both of which are part of the Newnan Commercial Historic District. It also runs along both sides of the historic Coweta County Courthouse between Broad and Washington streets. At Posey Street, the routes are joined by another concurrency with SR 34. The routes turn left onto Clark Street as they join another concurrency with westbound SR 34, only for US 29/SR 14 to leave the US 27 Alt./SR 16/SR 34 concurrency one block later at Jackson Street. As US 27 Alt./SR 16/SR 34 moves from Clark Street to Temple Avenue, they begin to head northwest out of Newnan, only for SR 34 to leave that concurrency at Franklin Road.

Crossing a bridge over the Chattahoochee River, and thus the Coweta–Carroll county line, the routes run through Whiteburg where they intersect SR 5 before briefly turning west-northwest between the communities of Banning and Clem, then turns back to the northwest. At the intersection with SR 166 in Carrollton, US 27 Alt./SR 16 makes a left turn with westbound SR 166 joining that concurrency until finally reaching its northern terminus, at a diamond interchange with US 27/SR 1. SR 166 continues west toward Ranburne, Alabama, while SR 16 continues north along US 27 through downtown Carrollton until breaking away and running to the northwest toward SR 100 south of I-20 near Tallapoosa and Waco.

The following portions of US 27 Alt. are part of the National Highway System, a system of routes determined to be the most important for the nation's economy, mobility, and defense:

- The entire Muscogee County portion
- From the I-85 interchange (on US 29/SR 14), just south of East Newnan, to just north of the southern end of the SR 34 concurrency (on US 29/SR 14/SR 16) in Newnan
- From an indeterminate point southeast of Carrollton to its northern terminus in the city.

== Major intersections ==
County	Location	mi	km	Destinations	Notes
Muscogee	Columbus	0.000	0.000	US 27 / SR 1 / SR 85 west	Southern terminus; southern end of concurrency with SR 85
Muscogee	Columbus	1.352	2.176	I-185 – LaGrange	Interchange
Muscogee	Columbus	3.638	5.855	Warm Springs Connector	Interchange
Muscogee	Columbus	5.006	8.056	Miller Road	Interchange
Muscogee	Midland	6.724	10.821	US 80 / SR 22 (J.R. Allen Parkway) / SR 540 (Fall Line Freeway) – Phenix City, Macon	Interchange
Muscogee	Midland	10.569	17.009	County Line Road	Interchange
Harris	Ellerslie	14.284	22.988	SR 315 west – Cataula	Southern end of concurrency with SR 315
Harris	Ellerslie	14.768	23.767	SR 315 east – Ridgeway	Northern end of concurrency with SR 315
Harris	Waverly Hall	20.520	33.024	SR 208 – Kingsboro, Talbotton	
Talbot		27.672	44.534	SR 85 north / SR 85 Alt. begins / SR 116 east – Manchester	Northern end of concurrency with SR 85; southern end of concurrencies with SR 85 Alt./SR 116; southern terminus of SR 85 Alt.
Harris	Shiloh	29.480	47.443	SR 116 west – Hamilton	Northern end of concurrency with SR 116
Talbot	No major junctions				
Meriwether	F. D. Roosevelt State Park	32.733	52.679	SR 190 (Pine Mountain Highway) – Pine Mountain, Manchester	
Meriwether	Warm Springs	36.183	58.231	SR 85 Alt. north (Whitehouse Parkway) / SR 41 south (Broad Street) – Woodbury, Manchester	Northern end of SR 85 Alt. concurrency; southern end of SR 41 concurrency
Meriwether	Warm Springs	36.901	59.386	SR 194 west – Durand	Eastern terminus of SR 194
Meriwether	Harris City	42.380	68.204	SR 18 south – Pine Mountain	Southern end of concurrency with SR 18
Meriwether	Greenville	46.583	74.968	SR 18 east / SR 100 north / SR 109 west – Woodbury, St. Marks, Mountville	Northern end of concurrency with SR 18
Meriwether		48.474	78.011	SR 362 east – Alvaton	Western terminus of SR 362
Meriwether	Luthersville	59.441	95.661	SR 54 Spur begins	Southern terminus of SR 54 Spur
Meriwether	Luthersville	59.589	95.899	SR 54 – Hogansville, Sharpsburg	
Coweta	Moreland	64.467	103.750	US 29 south / SR 14 south / SR 41 ends – Grantville	Southern end of concurrency with US 29 and SR 14; northern end of concurrency with SR 41; northern terminus of SR 41
Coweta		67.672	108.908	I-85 – Atlanta	I-85 exit 41
Coweta		68.129	109.643	SR 16 east – Sharpsburg	Southern end of concurrency with SR 16
Coweta	Newnan	71.316– 71.892	114.772– 115.699	US 29 north / SR 14 north / SR 34 east – Palmetto, Peachtree City	Northern end of concurrency with US 29 and SR 14; southern end of concurrency with SR 34; one-way pair
Coweta	Newnan	73.153	117.728	SR 34 west – Franklin	Northern end of concurrency with SR 34
Coweta	Newnan	73.921	118.964	SR 34 Byp. – Newnan	
Carroll	Whitesburg	82.336	132.507	SR 5 – Roopville, Douglasville	
Carroll	Carrollton	92.408	148.716	SR 166 east – Campbellton	Northern end of concurrency with SR 166
Carroll	Carrollton	94.118	151.468	US 27 / SR 1 / SR 16 west / SR 166 west	Northern terminus; northern end of concurrency with SR 16; southern end of concurrency with SR 166
1.000 mi = 1.609 km; 1.000 km = 0.621 mi: Concurrency terminus
