= Georgia State Route 85 =

State highway in Georgia

State Route 85
- SR 85; mainline in red, alternate routes in blue

Route information
- Maintained by GDOT
- Length: 96.49 mi (155.29 km)
- Existed: 1930–present

Major junctions
- South end: US 27 / SR 1 in Columbus
- US 27 / US 27 Alt. / SR 1 in Columbus; I-185 in Columbus; US 80 / SR 22 / SR 540 in Columbus; US 27 Alt. / SR 85 Alt. / SR 116 south of Shiloh
- North end: I-75 / I-285 in Forest Park

Location
- Country: United States
- State: Georgia
- Counties: Muscogee, Harris, Talbot, Meriwether, Coweta, Fayette, Clayton

Highway system
- Georgia State Highway System; Interstate; US; State; Special
← I-85	→ SR 86

State Route 85 (SR 85) is a 96.49-mile-long (155.29 km) state highway in the west-central part of the U.S. state of Georgia. It travels within portions of Muscogee, Harris, Talbot, Meriwether, Coweta, Fayette, and Clayton counties. It connects the Columbus and Forest Park areas, via Manchester, Woodbury, Senoia, Fayetteville, and Riverdale.

== Route description ==
=== Muscogee and Harris counties ===
GA SR 85 begins at an intersection with US 27/SR 1 in downtown Columbus. It continues to the northwest until it meets the southern terminus of SR 22 Connector. SR 85 then heads east as Manchester Expressway and meets SR 219 before it has a second intersection with US 27/SR 1. At that intersection, US 27 Alt. begins, running concurrent with SR 85. As Manchester Expressway, US 27 Alt./SR 85 have a junction with I-185 and then, after passing by Peachtree Mall and Columbus State University, travel northeast through Columbus as a freeway. There are four interchanges along the freeway section of Manchester Expressway, including one with the Fall Line Freeway (US 80/SR 22/(SR 540). At the point the highways meet SR 315 in Harris County, Manchester Expressway and its freeway section end. SR 315 shares a brief concurrency with US 27 Alt./SR 85 and then departs the road heading east. Upon crossing up to the Harris–Talbot county line, where US 27 Alt. north/SR 85 Alt. north/SR 116 west take the left fork at an intersection while SR 85 north and SR 116 east take the right one.

=== Talbot County ===
Less than 0.5 miles (0.80 km) into Talbot County, SR 116 splits off to the east, while SR 85 continues to the northeast. Just before entering Manchester, SR 85 intersects SR 41, which begins a short concurrency into Meriwether County and Manchester.

=== Meriwether County ===
SR 41 and SR 85 intersect the eastern terminus of SR 190 just inside of the Manchester city limits. At 2nd Street, SR 41 departs to the northwest, while SR 85 heads into downtown. Then, SR 85 turns to the east, while SR 85 Spur continues straight ahead. In Woodbury, SR 85 meets SR 18/SR 74/SR 109. At this intersection, SR 74 turns to the north, concurrent with SR 85. They reach the northern terminus of SR 85 Alternate. Farther to the north, in Gay, is the eastern terminus of SR 109 Spur. In the unincorporated community of Alps, they intersect SR 362, which briefly joins the concurrency. Less than 3 miles (4.8 km) later, SR 74 and 85 reach the Meriwether–Coweta county line.

=== Coweta County ===
The concurrent highways travel through Haralson and enter the southeast part of Senoia. There, they intersect with SR 16. Less than 2 miles (3.2 km) later, they cross over Line Creek, into Fayette County.

=== Fayette County ===
SR 74 and 85 enter Starrs Mill, where SR 74 departs to the northwest, while SR 85 continues to the northeast. In Fayetteville, it intersects SR 92, which forms a concurrency through the city, meeting SR 54 before SR 92 departs to the northwest. Further north, after SR 314 and SR 279 terminate at SR 85, the highway crosses over Camp Creek, into Clayton County.

=== Clayton County ===
On the southwestern edge of Riverdale, SR 85 intersects SR 138. Approximately 2,000 feet (610 m) north is the southern terminus of SR 139 (Church Street). Farther to the north is the western terminus of SR 331, which the northbound lanes of SR 85 have to take to access I-75. SR 85's northbound lanes continue for another 3,000 feet (910 m), and then they end at a U-turn to go back to the south. However, the southbound lanes start at a partial interchange with I-75 (which does not have access from I-75 north to SR 85) and I-285, approximately 1,500 feet (460 m) farther to the north-northeast.

=== National Highway System ===
There are two sections of SR 85 that are part of the National Highway System, a system of routes determined to be the most important for the nation's economy, mobility, and defense:

- From its southern terminus to the Muscogee–Harris county line, south-southwest of Ellerslie
- From its intersection with SR 54 in Fayetteville to its northern terminus

== Major intersections ==
County	Location	mi	km	Destinations	Notes
Muscogee	Columbus	0.000	0.000	US 27 / SR 1 (Veterans Parkway) / 14th Street east – Cusseta, LaGrange, Macon	Southern terminus; 14th Street continues past the southern terminus
Muscogee	Columbus	2.555	4.112	SR 22 Conn. north (2nd Avenue north) – West Point, Phenix City	Southern terminus of SR 22 Conn.
Muscogee	Columbus	3.031	4.878	SR 219 (River Road) – LaGrange	
Muscogee	Columbus	3.537	5.692	US 27 / SR 1 (Veterans Parkway) / US 27 Alt. begins – Hamilton, Fort Benning, Civil War Naval Museum	Southern end of US 27 Alt. concurrency; southern terminus of US 27 Alt.
Muscogee	Columbus	4.889	7.868	I-185 (SR 411) – Ft. Moore, Atlanta	I-185 exit 7
Muscogee	Columbus	7.181	11.557	Warm Springs Road Connector	Interchange
Muscogee	Columbus	8.547	13.755	Miller Road	Interchange
Muscogee	Midland	10.273	16.533	US 80 / SR 22 (J.R. Allen Parkway) / SR 540 (Fall Line Freeway) – Phenix City, Macon	Interchange
Muscogee	Midland	14.110	22.708	County Line Road	Interchange
Harris	Ellerslie	17.827	28.690	SR 315 west – Cataula	Southern end of SR 315 concurrency
Harris	Ellerslie	18.310	29.467	SR 315 east (Talbotton Road) / Old Warm Springs Road west – Talbotton	Northern end of SR 315 concurrency; eastern terminus of Old Warm Springs Road
Harris	Waverly Hall	24.061	38.722	SR 208 – Hamilton, Talbotton	
Harris–Talbot county line		31.221	50.245	US 27 Alt. north / SR 85 Alt. north / SR 116 west (Warm Springs Road) – Warm Springs, Shiloh, Roosevelt Rehab. Inst.	Northern end of US 27 Alt. concurrency; southern end of SR 116 concurrency; southern terminus of SR 85 Alt.
Talbot		31.607	50.867	SR 116 east (Rush Creek Highway) – Woodland	Northern end of SR 116 concurrency
Talbot		37.363	60.130	SR 41 south – Talbotton	Southern end of SR 41 concurrency
Meriwether	Manchester	37.759	60.767	SR 190 west (Pine Mountain Highway) – Pine Mountain, F.D. Roosevelt State Park	Eastern terminus of SR 190
Meriwether	Manchester	38.287	61.617	SR 41 north (Second Street) – Warm Springs	Northern end of SR 41 concurrency
Meriwether	Manchester	38.756	62.372	SR 85 Spur west (Truitt Street north) – Warm Springs	Eastern terminus of SR 85 Spur
Meriwether	Woodbury	48.611	78.232	SR 18 / SR 74 east / SR 109 (Main Street) – Greenville, Zebulon	Southern end of SR 74 concurrency
Meriwether	Woodbury	49.293	79.329	SR 85 Alt. south (Whitehouse Parkway) – Warm Springs	Northern terminus of SR 85 Alt.
Meriwether	Gay	56.378	90.732	SR 109 Spur west (Greenville Street) / Caldwell Road east – Greenville	Eastern terminus of SR 109 Spur; western terminus of Caldwell Road
Meriwether	Alps	61.327	98.696	SR 362 west (Callaway Road) – Greenville	Southern end of SR 362 concurrency
Meriwether	Alvaton	62.280	100.230	SR 362 east (Griffin Highway) – Griffin	North end of SR 362 concurrency
Coweta		68.217	109.785	Old Highway 85 north to SR 16	Southern terminus of Old Highway 85; former SR 85 north
Coweta	Senoia	71.289	114.729	SR 16 – Turin, Griffin	
Fayette	Starrs Mill	74.310	119.590	SR 74 north (Joel Cowan Parkway) / Padgett Road south – Peachtree City	North end of SR 74 concurrency; northern terminus of Padgett Road; SR 74 provides access to Atlanta Regional Airport
Fayette	Fayetteville	82.288	132.430	SR 92 south / Ramah Road west – Griffin	Southern end of SR 92 concurrency; eastern terminus of Ramah Road
Fayette	Fayetteville	83.584	134.515	SR 54 east (Stonewall Avenue) – Jonesboro	Eastbound lanes of SR 54 on one-way pair
Fayette	Fayetteville	83.645	134.614	SR 54 west (Lanier Avenue) – Peachtree City	Westbound lanes of SR 54 on one-way pair; provides access to Piedmont Fayette Hospital
Fayette	Fayetteville	84.217	135.534	SR 92 north (Forrest Avenue) / Easterbrook Way east – Fairburn	Northern end of SR 92 concurrency; western terminus of Easterbrook Way
Fayette	Fayetteville	84.780	136.440	SR 314 north (Jeff Davis Drive) – College Park	Southern terminus of SR 314
Fayette		88.269	142.055	SR 279 north – College Park	Southern terminus of SR 279
Clayton	Riverdale	91.199	146.771	SR 138 – Union City, Jonesboro	
Clayton	Riverdale	92.790	149.331	SR 139 north (Main Street) / Valley Hill Road east – College Park	Southern terminus of SR 139; western terminus of Valley Hill Road
Clayton		95.789	154.157	SR 331 east (Forest Parkway east) to I-75 – Forest Park, Lake City	Western terminus of SR 331; northbound SR 85 traffic must use this intersection to access I-75
Clayton		96.427	155.184	U-turn back to southbound SR 85	Northbound lanes closed from here onward
Clayton		96.486	155.279	I-75 (SR 401) / I-285 (Atlanta Bypass / SR 407)	Northern terminus; no entrance ramps from SR 85 north to I-75 or from I-75 north to SR 85; I-75 exit 237A; I-285 exit 58
1.000 mi = 1.609 km; 1.000 km = 0.621 mi: Concurrency terminus; Incomplete access

== History ==
=== 1930s ===
In 1930, SR 85 was established from Columbus to SR 41 in Warm Springs, with the Muscogee County portion and a small portion just slightly north of the Muscogee–Harris county line having a completed hard surface. By the middle of 1933, the portion of the highway from about Ellerslie to Warm Springs had a "sand clay or top soil" surface. The next year, the segment of the highway just south-southwest of Warm Springs was shifted westward to a curve into the city. In 1935, SR 85 was extended southeast on SR 41 to Manchester and then north-northeast through Woodbury and Senoia and into Fayetteville. At the end of 1936, two segments were under construction: around Shiloh and just west-southwest of Warm Springs. A few months later, SR 85 was extended north-northeast to US 19/US 41/SR 3 in Hapeville. By the middle of the year, a portion from approximately halfway between Waverly Hall and Shiloh to Warm Springs was under construction. Near the end of the year, the entire highway from Columbus to just south-southwest of Waverly Hall had a completed hard surface. A portion north-northeast of Waverly Hall was under construction, while the rest of the Waverly Hall–Warm Springs segment had completed grading, but was not surfaced. In 1938, a portion about halfway between Woodbury and Gay was under construction. A portion south of the Meriwether–Coweta county line under construction, as well. The portion just north-northeast of Riverdale was under construction, while the rest of the Riverdale–Hapeville segment had completed grading, but was not surfaced. By mid-1939, a small portion just south of Waverly Hall had a completed hard surface. Near the end of the year, a small portion just north-northeast of Senoia had a completed hard surface. The year ended with the segment from Waverly Hall to Warm Springs having a completed hard surface.

=== 1940s ===
In 1940, SR 163 was built from Warm Springs to Woodbury. From Manchester to approximately halfway between it and Woodbury, as well as the Gay–Oakland and Clayton County portions, SR 85 was under construction. From approximately halfway between Woodbury and Gay into Gay, SR 85 had completed grading, but was not surfaced. By the middle of 1941, SR 163's segment just northeast of Warm Springs was under construction. At the end of the year, a portion of SR 85 just east-northeast of Manchester, as well as a segment from the Fayette–Clayton county line to Riverdale, had a completed hard surface. At this time, a portion of the highway from south of Woodbury had completed grading, but was not surfaced. In 1942, a portion of SR 163 northeast of Warm Springs, as well as the Fayette County portion of the Fayetteville–Riverdale segment of SR 85, had completed grading, but was not surfaced. SR 85, from north-northeast of Starrs Mill to Fayetteville was under construction. The next year, a portion northeast of Manchester had a completed hard surface. In 1944, a portion south of Woodbury had a sand clay or top soil surface. Also, the Gay–Alvaton segment had completed grading, but was not surfaced. By the end of 1946, SR 85 was shifted eastward to a more direct path between Columbus and Manchester. Its old path between south of Shiloh and Warm Springs was redesignated as a southerly extension of SR 163. SR 85 Spur was built in Manchester from SR 41 to SR 85. The entire length of SR 85 from Columbus to Chalybeate Springs had a completed hard surface. A small portion north-northeast of Chalybeate Springs had a sand clay or top soil surface; the portion from there to Woodbury had a completed hard surface. Between 1946 and 1948, the Chalybeate Springs–Woodbury and Starrs Mill–Hapeville segments had a completed hard surface, while the Woodbury–Senoia segment had a "sand clay, top soil, or stabilized earth" surface. The next year, from Woodbury to just north-northwest of Gay, SR 85 had a completed hard surface.

=== 1950s ===
By the middle of 1950, US 27 Alt. was designated on SR 85 between Columbus and a point south of Shiloh and on SR 163 from there to Warm Springs. The segment of SR 85 from just north-northwest of Gay to Starrs Mill had a completed hard surface. By 1952, SR 163 was redesignated as SR 85W. That year, SR 85W's segment south of Warm Springs was reverted to being designated as SR 163. The next year, this was undone. Also, the segment of SR 85W from Warm Springs to Woodbury had completed grading, but was not surfaced. By the middle of 1955, this segment was hard surfaced. Two years later, SR 85 from south of Shiloh to Woodbury was redesignated as SR 85E.

=== 1960s to 1990s ===
Between 1960 and 1963, US 27 Alt. was shifted eastward onto SR 85E from south of Shiloh to Manchester. Between 1963 and 1966, the northern terminus was truncated to its current location in the extreme western part of Forest Park. About thirty years later, SR 85W was redesignated SR 85 Alt., while SR 85E was redesignated as part of the SR 85 mainline again.

When I-75 was first constructed, both directions of SR 85 connected to it at a partial Y interchange, just south of the interchange with I-285. Eventually, it became clear that the on-ramp carrying northbound SR 85 and the off-ramp for I-285 east were too close together, causing weaving on northbound I-75. Therefore, by the late 1970s, the entrance ramp to I-75 was relocated to diverge from nearby SR 331. The preexisting northbound ramp from SR 85 to I-75 was then truncated to end in the current U-turn. The area where the old ramp once stood is now covered over with trees.

On April 29, 1983, SR 85's southern terminus was moved from Fort Benning to the Georgia–Alabama border along the 14th Street Bridge linking Columbus and Phenix City. Along with this change, the SR 85 was also shifted off of Veteran's Parkway within Columbus slightly west to its current routing along 2nd Avenue south of Manchester Expressway. On June 4, 1987, both SR 85 and SR 219 were removed from the bridge over the border and SR 85 was made to end at its current southern terminus at the intersection of 14th Street and Veteran's Parkway.

== Special routes ==
=== Alternate route ===
State Route 85 Alternate
- Location: South of Shiloh to Woodbury
- Length: 18.7 mi (30.1 km)
- Existed: 1995–present

State Route 85 Alternate (SR 85 Alt.) is a 18.7-mile-long (30.1 km) alternate route of SR 85 that connects the Shiloh and Woodbury areas, via Warm Springs. From its southern terminus to Warm Springs, it is concurrent with U.S. Route 27 Alternate (US 27 Alt.).

The highway that would eventually become SR 85 Alt. was established in 1930, SR 85 was established from south of Shiloh to SR 41 in Warm Springs, with the Muscogee County portion and a small portion just slightly north of the Muscogee–Harris county line having a completed hard surface. By the middle of 1933, the portion of the highway from about Ellerslie to Warm Springs had a "sand clay or top soil" surface. The next year, the segment of the highway just south-southwest of Warm Springs was shifted westward to a curve into the city. At the end of 1936, two segments were under construction: around Shiloh and just west-southwest of Warm Springs. By the middle of the year, a portion from approximately halfway between Waverly Hall and Shiloh to Warm Springs was under construction. Near the end of the year, the entire highway from Columbus to just south-southwest of Waverly Hall had a completed hard surface. A portion north-northeast of Waverly Hall was under construction, while the rest of the Waverly Hall–Warm Springs segment had completed grading, but was not surfaced. By mid-1939, a small portion just south of Waverly Hall had a completed hard surface. The year ended with the segment from Waverly Hall to Warm Springs having a completed hard surface.

In 1940, SR 163 was built from Warm Springs to Woodbury. By the middle of 1941, SR 163's segment just northeast of Warm Springs was under construction. In 1942, a portion of SR 163 northeast of Warm Springs had completed grading, but was not surfaced. By the end of 1946, SR 85 was shifted eastward to a more direct path between Columbus and Manchester. Its old path between south of Shiloh and Warm Springs was redesignated as a southerly extension of SR 163. By the middle of 1950, US 27 Alt. was designated on SR 163 from south of Shiloh to Warm Springs. By 1952, SR 163 was redesignated as SR 85W. That year, SR 85W's segment south of Warm Springs was reverted to being designated as SR 163. The next year, this was undone. Also, the segment of SR 85W from Warm Springs to Woodbury had completed grading, but was not surfaced. By the middle of 1955, this segment was hard surfaced. Between 1960 and 1963, US 27 Alt. was shifted eastward off of SR 85W and onto SR 85E. About thirty-three years later, SR 85W was redesignated as SR 85 Alt.

County	Location	mi	km	Destinations	Notes
Harris–Talbot county line		0.0	0.0	US 27 Alt. south / SR 85 / SR 116 east – Columbus, Manchester	Southern terminus; southern end of US 27 Alt. and SR 116 concurrencies
Harris	Shiloh	1.8	2.9	SR 116 west / Ashmore Road east – Hamilton	Northern end of SR 116 concurrency; western terminus of Ashmore Road
Talbot	No major junctions				
Meriwether		5.0	8.0	SR 190 (Pine Mountain Highway) – Pine Mountain, Manchester, F.D. Roosevelt State Park, Pine Mountain Trail	
Meriwether	Warm Springs	8.5	13.7	US 27 Alt. north / SR 41 (Spring Street) – Greenville, Manchester, Warm Springs National Fish Hatchery, Roosevelt Rehab. Inst.	Northern end of US 27 Alt. concurrency
Meriwether		12.9	20.8	SR 173 south (Raleigh Road) – Raleigh	Northern terminus of SR 173
Meriwether	Woodbury	17.1	27.5	SR 18 / SR 109 (Main Street) – Greenville, Molena	
Meriwether	Woodbury	18.7	30.1	SR 74 / SR 85 (Oakland Road) – Thomaston, Gay	Northern terminus
1.000 mi = 1.609 km; 1.000 km = 0.621 mi: Concurrency terminus

=== Spur route ===
State Route 85 Spur
- Location: Manchester
- Length: 0.8 mi (1,300 m)
- Existed: 1946–present

State Route 85 Spur (SR 85 Spur) is a spur route of SR 85 that exists completely within the city limits of Manchester. It connects SR 41 (North 5th Avenue) with the SR 85 mainline. It is used to bypass downtown Manchester.

By the end of 1946, SR 85 Spur was built in Manchester from SR 41 to SR 85.

The entire route is in Manchester, Meriwether County.

mi	km	Destinations	Notes
0.0	0.0	SR 41 (Fifth Avenue) – Woodland, Warm Springs	Western terminus
0.8	1.3	SR 85 (Truitt Street south / Foster Street east) – Pine Mountain, Waverly Hall, Woodbury	Eastern terminus; SR 85 takes on Truitt Street name.
1.000 mi = 1.609 km; 1.000 km = 0.621 mi
