= Georgia State Route 116 =

State highway in Georgia, United States

State Route 116
- SR 116 highlighted in red

Route information
- Maintained by GDOT
- Length: 30.7 mi (49.4 km)

Major junctions
- West end: SR 103 / SR 219 west of Hamilton
- I-185 west of Hamilton; US 27 / SR 1 in Hamilton; US 27 Alt. / SR 85 south of Shiloh
- East end: SR 41 northwest of Woodland

Location
- Country: United States
- State: Georgia
- Counties: Harris, Talbot

Highway system
- Georgia State Highway System; Interstate; US; State; Special
← SR 115	→ SR 117

State Route 116 (SR 116) is a 30.7-mile-long (49.4 km) state highway that runs west-to-east through portions of Harris and Talbot counties in the west-central part of the U.S. state of Georgia.

== Route description ==
SR 116 begins at an intersection with SR 219, west of Hamilton, in Harris County. This intersection also marks the southern terminus of SR 103. Almost immediately is an interchange with Interchange 185 (I-185; Chet Atkins Parkway). In Hamilton is a very brief concurrency with US 27/SR 1 (Old College Street). Northeast of here is Pine Mountain Valley, where the road intersects the southern terminus of SR 354. SR 116 travels to the east into the town of Shiloh. There, it begins a concurrency with US 27 Alternate/SR 85 Alternate to the south. Just southeast of that intersection, the two routes run along the Harris–Talbot county line for a short while. To the south, the two routes meet SR 85 (Warm Springs Road). At this intersection, SR 85 Alternate meets its southern terminus. Also, SR 116 joins US 27 Alternate/SR 85 to the northeast. Immediately, it enters Talbot County. When SR 116 splits from the concurrency, it heads east-northeast. Then, it curves to the northeast just before it meets its eastern terminus, an intersection with SR 41 northwest of Woodland.

SR 116 is not part of the National Highway System, a system of roadways important to the nation's economy, defense, and mobility.

== Major intersections ==
County	Location	mi	km	Destinations	Notes
Harris		0.0	0.0	SR 103 north / SR 219	Western terminus of SR 116; southern terminus of SR 103
Harris		0.1	0.16	I-185 (Chet Atkins Parkway / SR 411) – Columbus, LaGrange	I-185 exit 25
Harris	Hamilton	9.0	14.5	US 27 south / SR 1 south (North College Street)	Western end of US 27/SR 1 concurrency
Harris	Hamilton	9.2	14.8	US 27 north / SR 1 north (Old College Street)	Eastern end of US 27/SR 1 concurrency
Harris	Pine Mountain Valley	13.4	21.6	SR 354 north (C Street) – Pine Mountain	Southern terminus of SR 354
Harris	Shiloh	21.8	35.1	US 27 Alt. north / SR 85 Alt. north	Western end of US 27 Alt./SR 85 Alt. concurrency
Harris–Talbot county line		23.6	38.0	US 27 Alt. south / SR 85 south / SR 85 Alt.	Eastern end of US 27 Alt. concurrency; western end of SR 85 concurrency; southern terminus of SR 85 Alt.
Talbot		24.0	38.6	SR 85 north – Manchester	Eastern end of SR 85 concurrency
Talbot		30.7	49.4	SR 41 – Woodland, Manchester	Eastern terminus
1.000 mi = 1.609 km; 1.000 km = 0.621 mi: Concurrency terminus

== See also ==
- List of highways numbered 116
