= Talbot County, Georgia =

County in Georgia, United States

- County
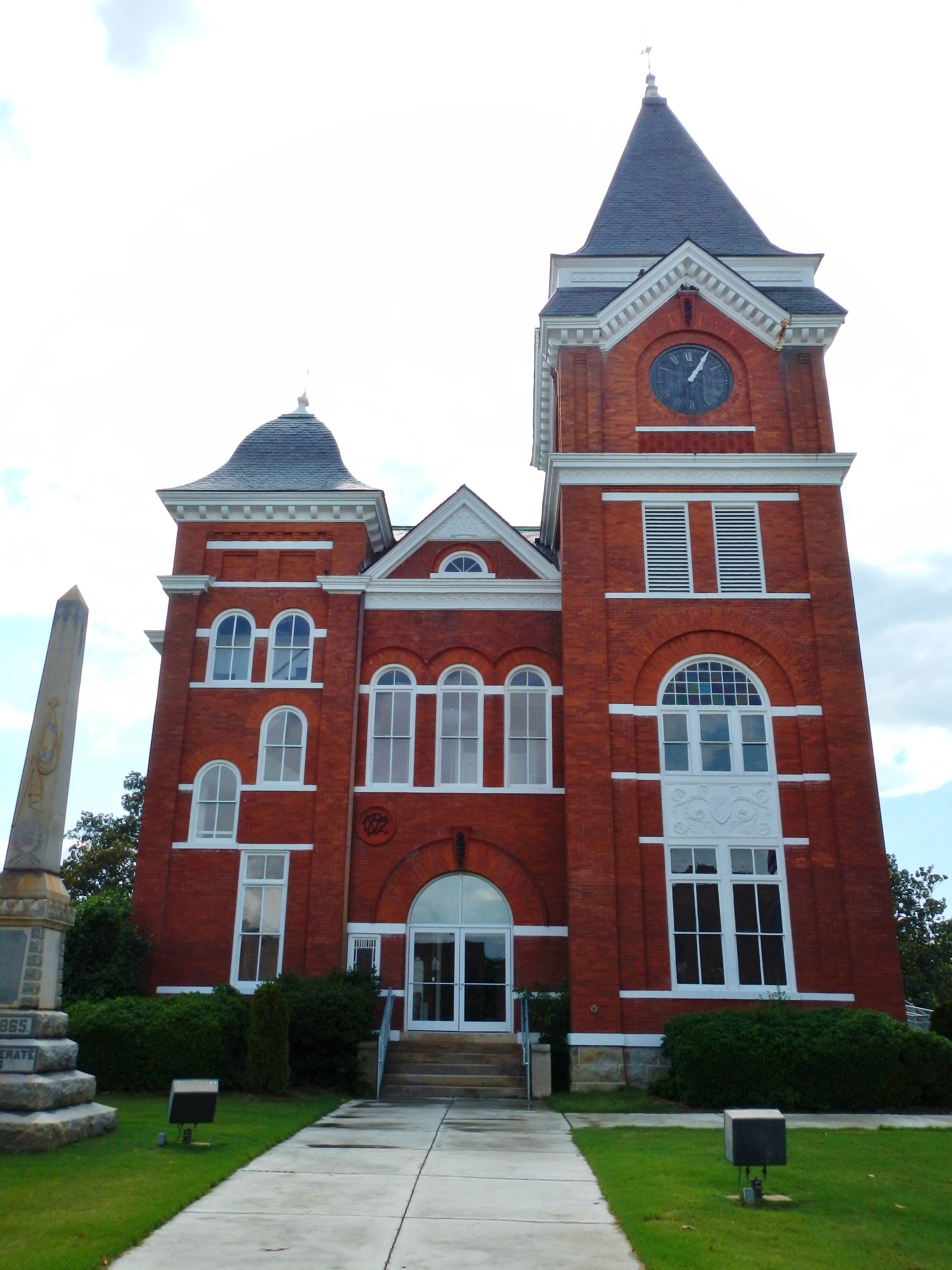
- Talbot County Courthouse and Confederate Monument in Talbotton

- Location within the U.S. state of Georgia
- Coordinates: 32°43′N 84°32′W
- Country: United States
- State: Georgia
- Founded: December 14, 1827; 198 years ago
- Named for: Matthew Talbot
- Seat: Talbotton
- Largest city: Talbotton

Area
  - Total: 395 sq mi (1,020 km^{2})
  - Land: 391 sq mi (1,010 km^{2})
  - Water: 3.4 sq mi (8.8 km^{2}) 0.9%

Population (2020)
  - Total: 5,733
  - Estimate (2025): 5,709 ▼
  - Density: 15/sq mi (5.8/km^{2})
- Time zone: UTC−5 (Eastern)
  - Summer (DST): UTC−4 (EDT)
- Congressional district: 2nd
- Website: talbotcountyga.org

Talbot County is a county located in the west central portion of the U.S. state of Georgia. The 2020 census showed a population of 5,733. The county seat and largest city is Talbotton.

== History ==
Talbot County was created from a portion of Muscogee County by a December 14, 1827, act of the Georgia General Assembly. It was named after the late Georgia governor Matthew Talbot. Taylor County was created from a portion of Talbot County in 1852.

== Geography ==
According to the U.S. Census Bureau, the county has a total area of 395 square miles (1,020 km^{2}), of which 391 square miles (1,010 km^{2}) is land and 3.4 square miles (8.8 km^{2}) (0.9%) is water.

The county straddles the fall line of the Eastern U.S., and thus northern areas of the county are hillier compared to southern areas of the county. The Fall Line Freeway runs across the southern portion of the county, following Georgia State Route 96 from Geneva to Junction City. The far northern portion of the county is part of the Pine Mountain Range, with elevations in this areas exceeding 1,000 ft on the highest peaks of the mountains.

The northeastern three-quarters of Talbot County is located in the Upper Flint River sub-basin of the Apalachicola-Chattahoochee-Flint River Basin. The southwestern quarter, west of Junction City, is located in the Middle Chattahoochee River-Walter F. George Lake sub-basin, while a narrow sliver of the western border, east of Waverly Hall, is located in the Middle Chattahoochee River-Lake Harding sub-basin.

=== Major highways ===
- U.S. Route 27 Alternate / State Route 85 Alternate
- U.S. Route 80 / State Route 22
- State Route 36
- State Route 41
- State Route 85
- State Route 96
- State Route 116
- State Route 190
- State Route 208
- State Route 240
- State Route 315
- State Route 540 (Fall Line Freeway)

=== Adjacent counties ===
- Upson County - northeast
- Taylor County - southeast
- Marion County - south
- Chattahoochee County - southwest
- Muscogee County - west-southwest
- Harris County - west
- Meriwether County - north

=== Railroads ===
- CSX Fitzgerald Subdivision
- Norfolk Southern Columbus District

== Communities ==
=== Cities ===
- Talbotton (county seat)
- Woodland
- Manchester (part)

=== Towns ===
- Geneva
- Junction City

=== Census-designated place ===
- Box Springs

=== Unincorporated communities ===
- Centerville
- Po Biddy Crossroads
- Tax Crossroads

== Demographics ==
Historical population
Census	Pop.	Note	%±
1830	5,940		—
1840	15,627		163.1%
1850	16,534		5.8%
1860	13,616		−17.6%
1870	11,913		−12.5%
1880	14,115		18.5%
1890	13,258		−6.1%
1900	12,197		−8.0%
1910	11,696		−4.1%
1920	11,158		−4.6%
1930	8,458		−24.2%
1940	8,141		−3.7%
1950	7,687		−5.6%
1960	7,127		−7.3%
1970	6,625		−7.0%
1980	6,536		−1.3%
1990	6,524		−0.2%
2000	6,498		−0.4%
2010	6,865		5.6%
2020	5,733		−16.5%
2025 (est.)	5,709	▼	−0.4%
U.S. Decennial Census; 1790-1880 1890-1910; 1920-1930 1930-1940; 1940-1950 1960-1980; 1980-2000; 2010 2020

=== Racial and ethnic composition ===
Talbot County, Georgia – Racial and ethnic composition Note: the US Census treats Hispanic/Latino as an ethnic category. This table excludes Latinos from the racial categories and assigns them to a separate category. Hispanics/Latinos may be of any race.
Race / Ethnicity (NH = Non-Hispanic)	Pop 1980	Pop 1990	Pop 2000	Pop 2010	Pop 2020	% 1980	% 1990	% 2000	% 2010	% 2020
White alone (NH)	2,294	2,412	2,354	2,639	2,427	35.10%	36.97%	36.23%	38.44%	42.33%
Black or African American alone (NH)	4,160	4,045	3,974	4,039	3,056	63.65%	62.00%	61.16%	58.83%	53.31%
Native American or Alaska Native alone (NH)	4	13	14	18	5	0.06%	0.20%	0.22%	0.26%	0.09%
Asian alone (NH)	4	3	18	9	17	0.06%	0.05%	0.28%	0.13%	0.30%
Native Hawaiian or Pacific Islander alone (NH)	x	x	1	0	1	x	x	0.02%	0.00%	0.02%
Other race alone (NH)	0	0	3	3	6	0.00%	0.00%	0.05%	0.04%	0.10%
Mixed race or Multiracial (NH)	x	x	52	66	109	x	x	0.80%	0.96%	1.90%
Hispanic or Latino (any race)	74	51	82	91	112	1.13%	0.78%	1.26%	1.33%	1.95%
Total	6,536	6,524	6,498	6,865	5,733	100.00%	100.00%	100.00%	100.00%	100.00%

=== 2020 census ===
As of the 2020 census, the county had a population of 5,733 and 1,849 families residing in the county. The median age was 51.4 years, with 16.6% of residents under the age of 18 and 26.0% of residents aged 65 or older.

For every 100 females there were 91.7 males, and for every 100 females age 18 and over there were 89.2 males age 18 and over. 0.0% of residents lived in urban areas, while 100.0% lived in rural areas.

The racial makeup of the county was 42.9% White, 53.7% Black or African American, 0.1% American Indian and Alaska Native, 0.3% Asian, 0.0% Native Hawaiian and Pacific Islander, 0.2% from some other race, and 2.8% from two or more races. Hispanic or Latino residents of any race comprised 2.0% of the population.

There were 2,524 households in the county, of which 22.5% had children under the age of 18 living with them and 34.0% had a female householder with no spouse or partner present. About 32.5% of all households were made up of individuals and 16.6% had someone living alone who was 65 years of age or older.

There were 3,042 housing units, of which 17.0% were vacant. Among occupied housing units, 79.1% were owner-occupied and 20.9% were renter-occupied. The homeowner vacancy rate was 1.4% and the rental vacancy rate was 4.5%.

== Education ==
The Talbot County School District holds pre-school to grade twelve, and consists of one building with 48 full-time teachers and 792 students. The district headquarters is in Talbotton.

== Politics ==
As of the 2020s, Talbot County is a fairly safe Democratic voting county, voting 56% for Kamala Harris in 2024. Like most majority-African-American counties in Georgia, Talbot is a reliably Democratic county. Between 1880 and 2020, Talbot County has only voted Republican three times, although it also voted for American Independent segregationist George Wallace in 1968. Donald Trump's 39.50% in 2020 was the best performance for a Republican since Nixon in the 1972 presidential election. In 2024, Trump furthered increased his vote share to almost 44% of the vote.

For elections to the United States House of Representatives, Talbot County is part of Georgia's 2nd congressional district, currently represented by Sanford Bishop. For elections to the Georgia State Senate, Talbot County is part of District 15. For elections to the Georgia House of Representatives, Talbot County is part of District 137.

United States presidential election results for Talbot County, Georgia
Year	Republican		Democratic		Third party(ies)	
Year	No.	%	No.	%	No.	%
1912	8	1.48%	446	82.44%	87	16.08%
1916	17	3.14%	511	94.28%	14	2.58%
1920	43	10.19%	379	89.81%	0	0.00%
1924	33	6.27%	491	93.35%	2	0.38%
1928	74	12.13%	536	87.87%	0	0.00%
1932	45	4.69%	912	95.00%	3	0.31%
1936	41	4.86%	796	94.42%	6	0.71%
1940	49	6.94%	656	92.92%	1	0.14%
1944	45	5.13%	832	94.87%	0	0.00%
1948	92	11.33%	582	71.67%	138	17.00%
1952	175	20.52%	678	79.48%	0	0.00%
1956	136	16.08%	710	83.92%	0	0.00%
1960	207	21.17%	771	78.83%	0	0.00%
1964	679	51.99%	627	48.01%	0	0.00%
1968	317	20.92%	510	33.66%	688	45.41%
1972	990	66.09%	508	33.91%	0	0.00%
1976	459	21.93%	1,634	78.07%	0	0.00%
1980	572	25.50%	1,635	72.89%	36	1.60%
1984	778	34.24%	1,494	65.76%	0	0.00%
1988	802	38.93%	1,248	60.58%	10	0.49%
1992	671	25.02%	1,768	65.92%	243	9.06%
1996	652	27.79%	1,579	67.31%	115	4.90%
2000	844	33.35%	1,662	65.67%	25	0.99%
2004	1,103	37.43%	1,830	62.10%	14	0.48%
2008	1,301	35.15%	2,369	64.01%	31	0.84%
2012	1,202	34.41%	2,265	64.84%	26	0.74%
2016	1,196	36.68%	2,002	61.39%	63	1.93%
2020	1,392	39.50%	2,114	59.99%	18	0.51%
2024	1,483	43.89%	1,888	55.87%	8	0.24%

United States Senate election results for Talbot County, Georgia2
Year	Republican		Democratic		Third party(ies)	
Year	No.	%	No.	%	No.	%
2020	1,386	40.17%	2,013	58.35%	51	1.48%
2020	1,242	38.97%	1,945	61.03%	0	0.00%

United States Senate election results for Talbot County, Georgia3
Year	Republican		Democratic		Third party(ies)	
Year	No.	%	No.	%	No.	%
2020	677	19.63%	1,531	44.40%	1,240	35.96%
2020	1,392	39.70%	2,114	60.30%	0	0.00%
2022	1,118	39.24%	1,688	59.25%	43	1.51%
2022	1,061	39.80%	1,605	60.20%	0	0.00%

Georgia Gubernatorial election results for Talbot County
Year	Republican		Democratic		Third party(ies)	
Year	No.	%	No.	%	No.	%
2022	1,214	42.39%	1,628	56.84%	22	0.77%

== See also ==
- National Register of Historic Places listings in Talbot County, Georgia
- List of counties in Georgia
- USS Talbot County landing ship named for Talbot County, Maryland and Talbot County, Georgia
