= Po Biddy Crossroads, Georgia =

Unincorporated community in Georgia, United States

Po Biddy Crossroads
- Unincorporated community
- Location within Georgia Location within the United States
- Coordinates: 32°41′25″N 84°28′19″W
- Country: United States
- State: Georgia
- County: Talbot
- Elevation: 640 ft (200 m)
- Time zone: UTC-5 (Eastern (EST))
  - Summer (DST): UTC-4 (EDT)
- GNIS feature ID: 326474

Po Biddy Crossroads is an unincorporated community in Talbot County, Georgia, United States.

The settlement is located 4 mi (6.4 km) east of Talbotton on U.S. Route 80.

== History ==
Po Biddy Crossroads acquired its name following a dinner party in the community where fried chicken was served. When a guest took the last piece of chicken, a female guest exclaimed, "there goes the last of the po' biddy!" (Southern vernacular for "poor little chicken"). The name "Po Biddy" was later proposed by someone registering a filling station at the settlement, "and the community has borne the moniker ever since".
