= Roxana, Alabama =

Unincorporated community in Alabama, United States

- Unincorporated community
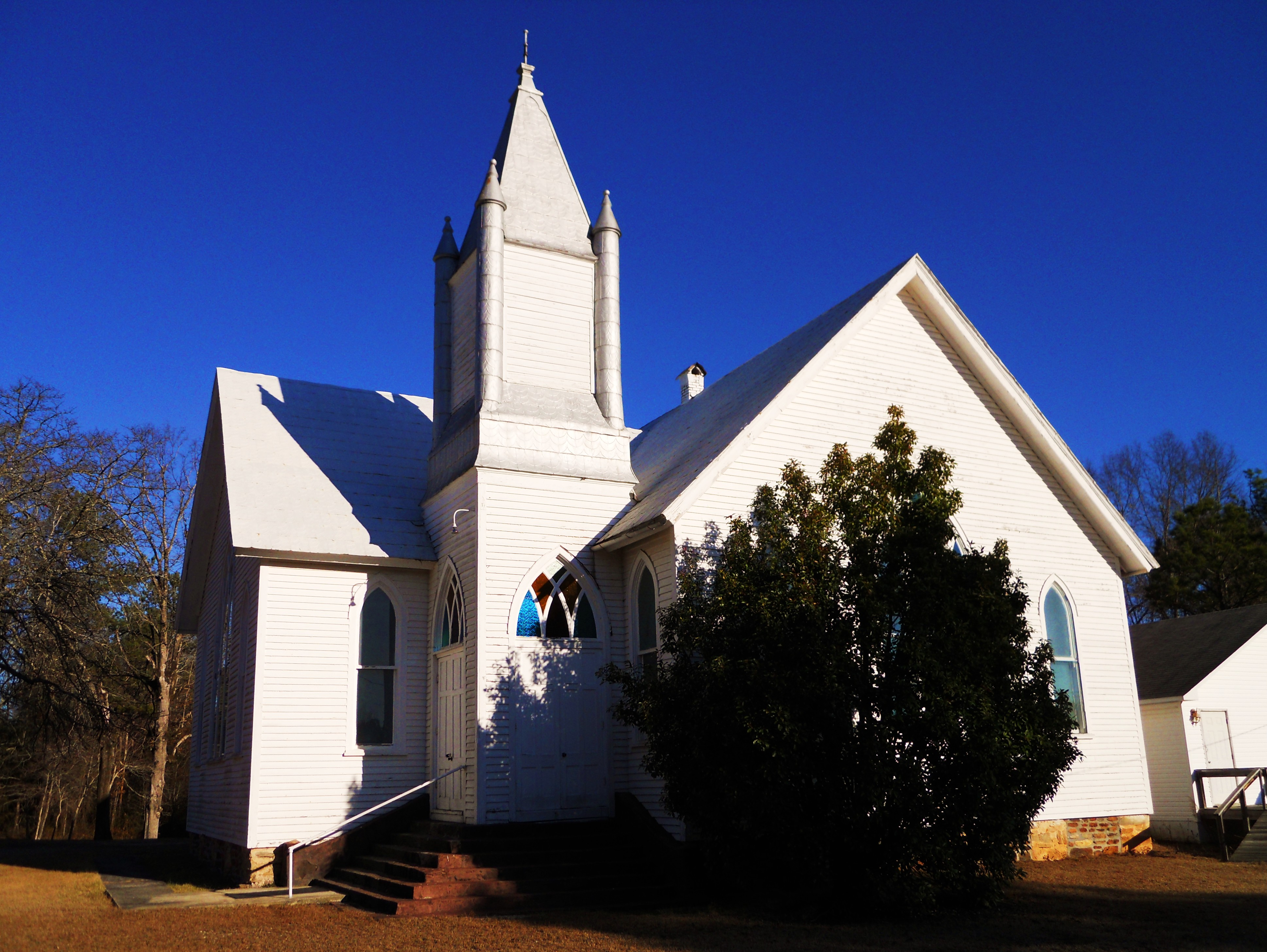
- Roxana United Methodist Church

- Location within Alabama Location within the United States
- Coordinates: 32°41′13″N 85°40′09″W
- Country: United States
- State: Alabama
- County: Lee
- Elevation: 738 ft (225 m)
- Time zone: UTC-6 (CST)
  - Summer (DST): UTC-6 (EDT)
- GNIS feature ID: 125999

Roxana, also known as Rock Springs, /rɒksænə/ is an unincorporated community northwesterly located in Lee County, Alabama, United States. It lies seven miles (11 km) north of Notasulga and five miles (8.0 km) southwest of Waverly. It is part of the Columbus, Georgia-Alabama Metropolitan Area.

== History ==
Roxana was originally named Rock Springs. Since there was already a Rock Springs post office registered in Alabama, Samuel A. Burns, the first postmaster, devised a new name. He combined "rocks" and "Anna", the name of his wife, to come up with Roxana. A post office operated under the name Roxana from 1882 to 1908.
