= Piney Grove, Georgia =

Coordinates: 32°37′33″N 85°02′12″W

- Unincorporated community Census-designated place
- Interactive map of Piney Grove, Georgia
- Country: United States
- State: Georgia
- County: Harris
- Established: N/A
- Elevation: 594 ft (181 m)

Population (2020)
  - Total: 434
- Time zone: UTC-5 (Eastern (EST))
  - Summer (DST): UTC-4 (EDT)
- ZIP code: 31808
- Area code: 706

Piney Grove is an unincorporated community and census-designated place (CDP) in Harris County, Georgia, United States.

The 2020 census listed a population of 434.

== Geography ==
Piney Grove is located at the intersection of state routes 219 and 315. Atlanta is 86 mi (138 km) by road to the northeast and Columbus is 12 mi (19 km) by road to the south.

== Demographics ==
Historical population
Census	Pop.	Note	%±
2020	434		—
U.S. Decennial Census; 2020

Piney Grove was first listed as a census designated place in the 2020 U.S. census.

Piney Grove CDP, Georgia – racial and ethnic composition Note: the US Census treats Hispanic/Latino as an ethnic category. This table excludes Latinos from the racial categories and assigns them to a separate category. Hispanics/Latinos may be of any race.
Race / ethnicity (NH = Non-Hispanic)	Pop 2020	% 2020
White alone (NH)	339	78.11%
Black or African American alone (NH)	61	14.06%
Native American or Alaska Native alone (NH)	0	0.00%
Asian alone (NH)	10	2.30%
Pacific Islander alone (NH)	0	0.00%
Other race alone (NH)	0	0.00%
Mixed race or multiracial (NH)	14	3.23%
Hispanic or Latino (any race)	10	2.30%
Total	434	100.00%
