= Ellerslie, Georgia =

- Unincorporated community Census-designated place
- Location within Georgia Location within the United States
- Coordinates: 32°37′53″N 84°48′4″W
- Country: United States
- State: Georgia
- County: Harris
- Established: 1828
- Elevation: 720 ft (220 m)

Population (2020)
  - Total: 1,053
- Time zone: UTC-5 (Eastern (EST))
  - Summer (DST): UTC-4 (EDT)
- ZIP code: 31807
- Area code: 706
- GNIS feature ID: 331650

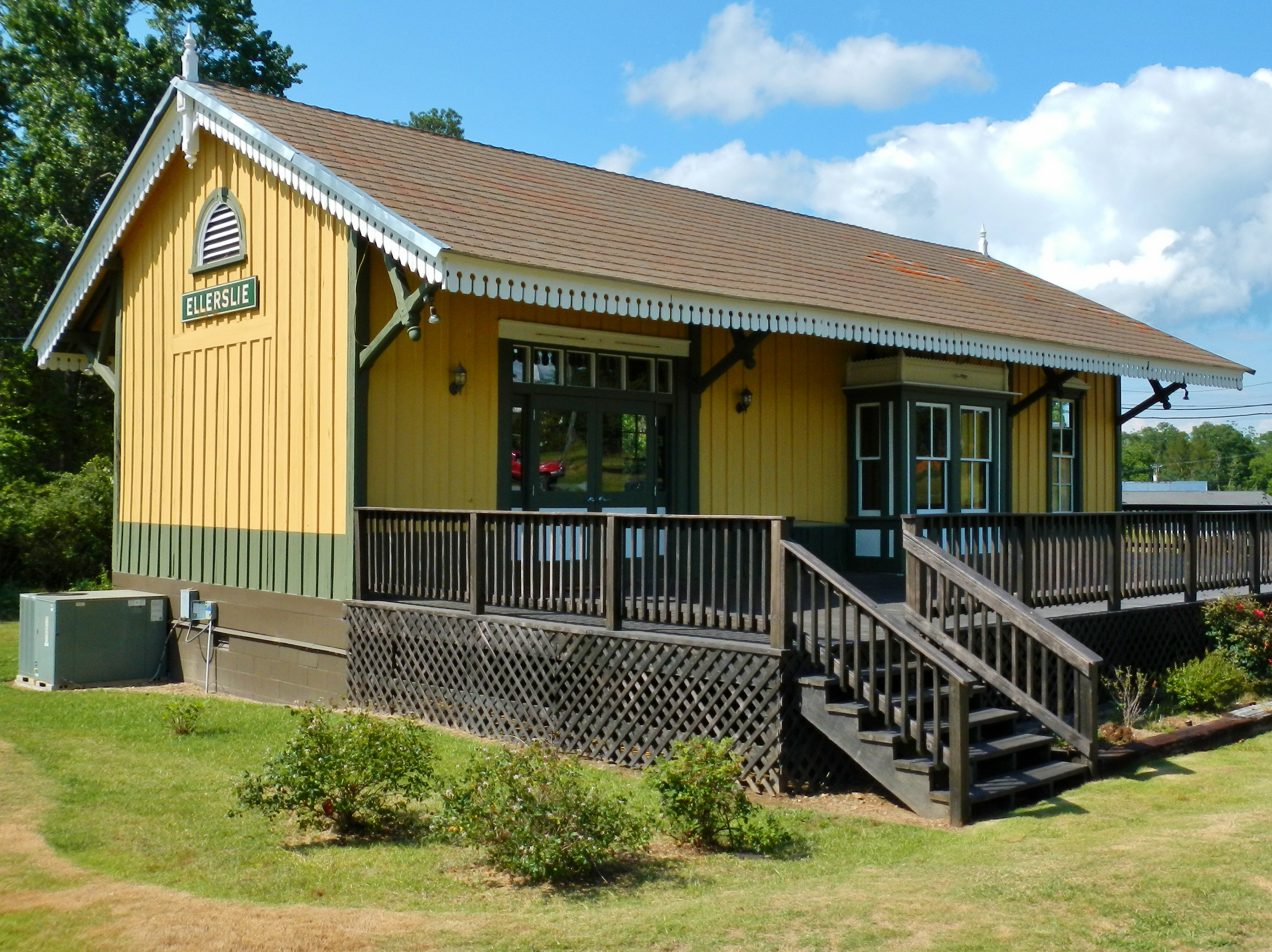
The Ellerslie Depot was originally built in 1891. The building has been restored and is currently used as a community center and symbol of the community.

Ellerslie is an unincorporated community and census-designated place (CDP) in Harris County, Georgia, United States. Ellerslie is a part of the Columbus, Georgia metropolitan area.

It was first listed as a CDP in the 2020 census with a population of 1,053.

== History ==
A post office called Ellerslie has been in operation since 1828. The name of the community is believed to have origins from a character in the Waverley Novels written by Sir Walter Scott named Captain Ellerslie.

The community was struck by a tornado on March 3, 2019, bringing down several trees and damaging the roofs of some homes in the area. No injuries or fatalities occurred.

== Geography ==
Ellerslie is located along Alternate U.S. Route 27 and Georgia State Route 85 (SR 85), a highway that runs northeast to southwest through the city, leading southwest 18 miles (29 km) to Columbus and northeast 5 miles (8 km) to Waverly Hall. The highway meets Georgia State Route 315 in the city to form a 0.5-mile-long (0.80 km) concurrency within Ellerslie. Atlanta is approximately 80 miles (129 km) by SR 85 to the northeast. Ellerslie is approximately 730 feet (220 m) above sea level. It is located in the Piedmont region of the state just a few miles north of the fall line.

== Demographics ==
Historical population
Census	Pop.	Note	%±
2020	1,053		—
U.S. Decennial Census; 2020

Ellerslie was first listed as a census designated place in the 2020 census.

=== 2020 census ===
As of the 2020 census, Ellerslie had a population of 1,053. The median age was 43.4 years. 20.9% of residents were under the age of 18 and 14.5% of residents were 65 years of age or older. For every 100 females there were 78.2 males, and for every 100 females age 18 and over there were 67.9 males age 18 and over.

0.0% of residents lived in urban areas, while 100.0% lived in rural areas.

There were 397 households in Ellerslie, of which 31.5% had children under the age of 18 living in them. Of all households, 70.5% were married-couple households, 6.8% were households with a male householder and no spouse or partner present, and 19.1% were households with a female householder and no spouse or partner present. About 16.1% of all households were made up of individuals and 9.0% had someone living alone who was 65 years of age or older.

There were 407 housing units, of which 2.5% were vacant. The homeowner vacancy rate was 0.0% and the rental vacancy rate was 0.0%.

Ellerslie CDP, Georgia – Racial and ethnic composition Note: the US Census treats Hispanic/Latino as an ethnic category. This table excludes Latinos from the racial categories and assigns them to a separate category. Hispanics/Latinos may be of any race.
Race / Ethnicity (NH = Non-Hispanic)	Pop 2020	% 2020
White alone (NH)	844	80.15%
Black or African American alone (NH)	108	10.26%
Native American or Alaska Native alone (NH)	8	0.76%
Asian alone (NH)	12	1.14%
Pacific Islander alone (NH)	0	0.00%
Some Other Race alone (NH)	4	0.38%
Mixed Race or Multi-Racial (NH)	40	3.80%
Hispanic or Latino (any race)	37	3.51%
Total	1,053	100.00%

== Education ==
The community is home to one of the seven schools in the county:

- Pine Ridge Elementary School
