= Talbot County School District =

School district in Georgia (U.S. state)

Address
- 945 North Washington Avenue Talbotton, Georgia, 31827-2527; United States
- Coordinates: 32.678179°N 84.543872°W

District information
- Grades: Pre-school - 12
- Superintendent: James Catrett
- Accreditation(s): Southern Association of Colleges and Schools; Georgia Accrediting Commission

Students and staff
- Enrollment: 792
- Faculty: 48

Other information
- Telephone: (706) 665-8528
- Website: www.talbot.k12.ga.us

The Talbot County School District is a public school district in Talbot County, Georgia, United States, based in Talbotton. It serves the communities of Geneva, Junction City, Talbotton, Box Springs, and Woodland.

== Schools ==
The Talbot County School District has one school, housing pre-school through twelfth grade in one building.

- Central Elementary Middle & High School
