= Centerville, Talbot County, Georgia =

Unincorporated community in Georgia, U.S.

Coordinates: 32°41′41″N 84°27′20″W

Centerville is an unincorporated community in Talbot County, in the U.S. state of Georgia.

== History ==
Centerville was established in the 1820s as the county seat. Centerville then was located near the geographic center of Talbot County, hence the name. A variant name was "Centre". The Georgia General Assembly incorporated the place as the "Town of Centreville" in 1835. The town once had its own school district, formed by an act of legislature in 1905. The town was an incorporated municipality until its charter was officially dissolved in 1995.
