= Alps, Georgia =

- Unincorporated community
- Location within Georgia Location within the United States
- Coordinates: 33°8′53″N 84°36′12″W
- Country: United States
- State: Georgia
- County: Meriwether
- Elevation: 850 ft (260 m)
- Time zone: UTC-5 (Eastern (EST))
  - Summer (DST): UTC-4 (EDT)
- GNIS feature ID: 354290

Alps is an unincorporated community located in Meriwether County, Georgia, United States.

A post office called Alps was established in 1890, and remained in operation until 1910. The community was located inland away from the railroads.
