= Standing Boy Creek =

Stream in Georgia, U.S.

Coordinates: 32°32′38.50″N 85°1′1.76″W

Standing Boy Creek is a stream in the U.S. state of Georgia. It is a tributary to the Chattahoochee River.

== Name ==
The name "Standing Boy Creek" is the English translation of an old Native American name.

Many variant names have been recorded:

- Cheepounhuiltee Creek
- Chepounhuiltee Creek
- Chessethulucco
- Chiponusihuili
- Chucethlocco Creek
- Chusethlocco Creek
- Chusethuicco
- Chussethlucco Creek
- Douglas Creek
- End Creek
- Hatchauxa Creek
- Hatchee Uxa Creek
- Mountain Creek

== See also ==
- Standing Boy Creek State Park
