= Echeconnee Creek =

Stream in Georgia, U.S.

Coordinates: 32°39′52″N 83°35′52″W

Echeconnee Creek is a stream in the U.S. state of Georgia. It is a tributary to the Ocmulgee River.

Echeconnee is a name derived from the Muskogee language meaning "deer trap". Many variant names have been recorded, including "Echconna Creek", "Echeconno Creek", "Ichiconna Creek", "Icho-con-naugh Creek", "Icho-conno Creek", "Ichocunno Creek", "Itcheecono Creek", "Itchocunnah Creek", "Itchocunnau Creek", "Itchocunno Creek", and "Itchy Creek".
