= Ridgeway, Georgia =

Unincorporated community in Georgia, US

Coordinates: 32°38′7.49″N 84°43′17.74″W

Ridgeway is an unincorporated community in Harris County, in the U.S. state of Georgia.

== History ==
Ridgeway was founded ca. 1829, and named for the ridge upon which the town site rests. A variant name was "Mount Airy". A post office called Ridgeway was established in 1888, and remained in operation until 1903.
