= Box Springs, Georgia =

- Unincorporated community Census-designated place
- Location within Georgia
- Coordinates: 32°31′58″N 84°39′40″W
- Country: United States
- State: Georgia
- County: Talbot
- Elevation: 367 ft (112 m)

Population (2020)
  - Total: 303
- Time zone: UTC-5 (Eastern (EST))
  - Summer (DST): UTC-4 (EDT)
- ZIP code: 31801
- Area codes: 706 & 762
- GNIS feature ID: 354828

Box Springs is an unincorporated community and census-designated place (CDP) in Talbot County, Georgia, United States. The community is located in the county's extreme southwestern corner, 12.2 miles (19.6 km) southwest of Talbotton. Box Springs has a post office with ZIP code 31801.

The 2020 census listed a population of 303.

== History ==
A post office has been in operation at Box Springs since 1853. The community was named for a local spring that was boxed in and used as a watering stop for the railroad. Pipes were run from the "boxed-spring" to a water tower adjacent to the tracks. The name Boxed Spring was later changed to Box Springs, as it was easier to pronounce.

The Georgia General Assembly incorporated the place as the "Town of Box Springs" in 1913. The town's charter was dissolved in 1931.

== Demographics ==
Historical population
Census	Pop.	Note	%±
2020	303		—
U.S. Decennial Census; 2020

Box Springs was first listed as a census designated place in the 2020 census.

Box Springs CDP, Georgia – Racial and ethnic composition Note: the US Census treats Hispanic/Latino as an ethnic category. This table excludes Latinos from the racial categories and assigns them to a separate category. Hispanics/Latinos may be of any race.
Race / Ethnicity (NH = Non-Hispanic)	Pop 2020	% 2020
White alone (NH)	157	51.82%
Black or African American alone (NH)	131	43.23%
Native American or Alaska Native alone (NH)	0	0.00%
Asian alone (NH)	0	0.00%
Native Hawaiian or Pacific Islander alone (NH)	0	0.00%
Other Race alone (NH)	0	0.00%
Mixed race or Multiracial (NH)	4	1.32%
Hispanic or Latino (any race)	11	3.63%
Total	303	100.00%
