= Raleigh, Georgia =

Unincorporated community in Georgia, U.S.

Coordinates: 32°56′12″N 84°38′11″W

Raleigh is an unincorporated community in Meriwether County, in the U.S. state of Georgia.

== History ==
The community was named after Raleigh Bowden. A post office called Raleigh was established in 1887, and remained in operation until 1957. Raleigh was an incorporated municipality from 1925 until 1995.
