= Mulberry Grove, Georgia =

Unincorporated community in Georgia, U.S.

Coordinates: 32°39′46.49″N 84°57′26.76″W

Mulberry Grove is an unincorporated community in Harris County, in the U.S. state of Georgia.

== History ==
A post office called Mulberry Grove was established in 1831, and remained in operation until 1904. The community was named for mulberry trees near the original town site.
