= Waverly Hall, Georgia =

- Town
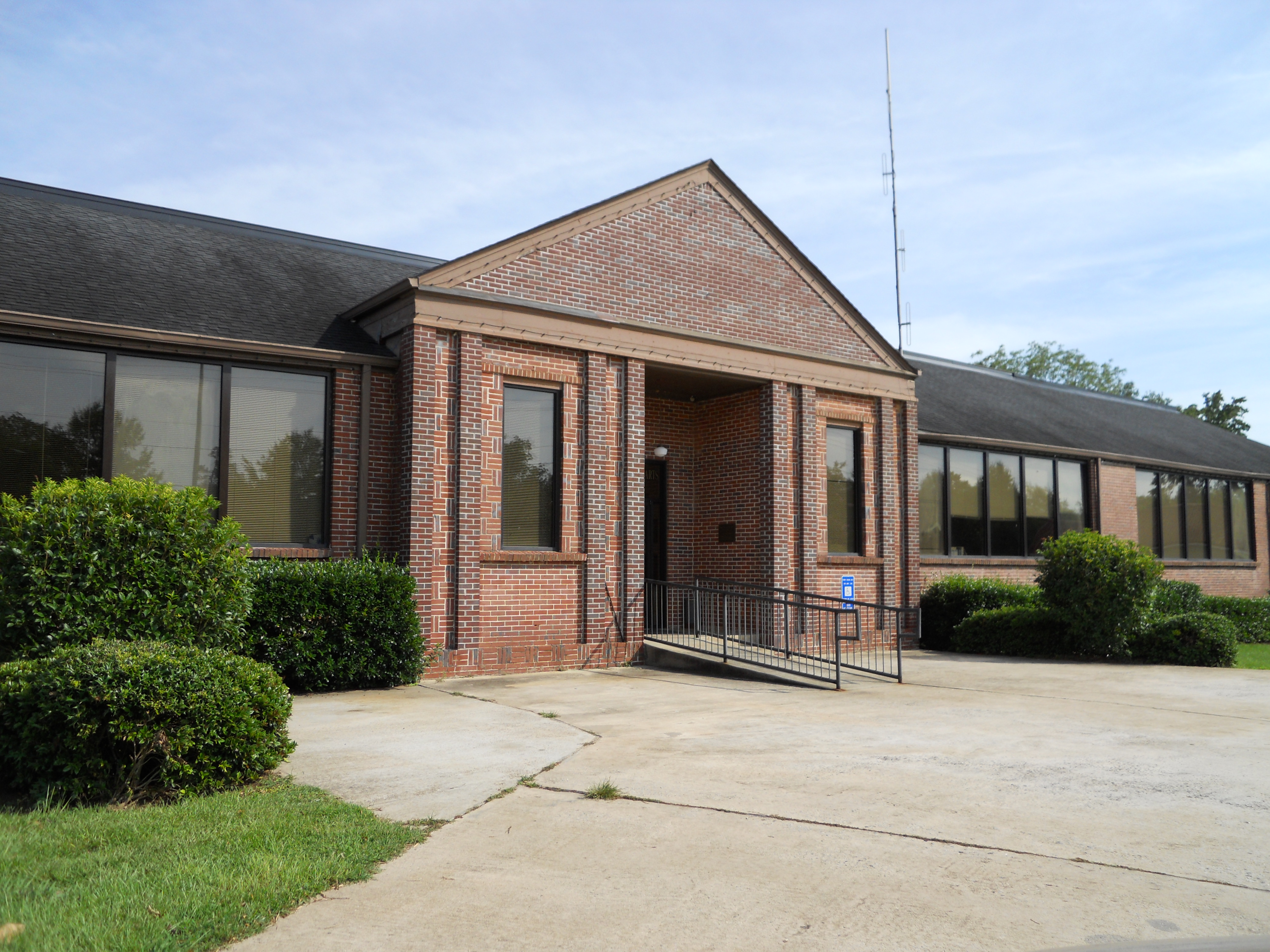
- The Waverly Hall Government & Arts Building

- Location in Harris County and the state of Georgia
- Coordinates: 32°41′5″N 84°44′18″W
- Country: United States
- State: Georgia
- County: Harris

Area
  - Total: 3.36 sq mi (8.70 km^{2})
  - Land: 3.34 sq mi (8.64 km^{2})
  - Water: 0.019 sq mi (0.05 km^{2})
- Elevation: 741 ft (226 m)

Population (2020)
  - Total: 638
  - Density: 191.2/sq mi (73.81/km^{2})
- Time zone: UTC-5 (Eastern (EST))
  - Summer (DST): UTC-4 (EDT)
- ZIP code: 31831
- Area code: 706
- FIPS code: 13-80844
- GNIS feature ID: 0333376
- Website: waverlyhallga.gov

Waverly Hall is a town in Harris County, Georgia, United States. It is part of the Columbus, Georgia-Alabama metropolitan statistical area. The population was 638 in 2020.

== History ==
A post office called Waverly was established in 1829. The community derives its name from Sir Walter Scott's Waverley novels.

The Georgia General Assembly incorporated Waverly Hall as a town in 1914.

== Geography ==
Waverly Hall is located in west-central Georgia within the Piedmont geographical region at 32°41′5″N 84°44′18″W (32.684607, -84.738405), in eastern Harris County. Alternate U.S. Route 27 and Georgia State Route 85 run northeast to southeast through the city, leading southwest 24 miles (39 km) to Columbus and north 10 miles (16 km) to Shiloh. The two highways meet Georgia State Route 208 in the northern city limits. Atlanta is 83 miles (134 km) by road to the northeast.

According to the United States Census Bureau, the town has a total area of 3.4 square miles (8.7 km^{2}), of which 0.02 square miles (0.05 km^{2}), or 0.60%, are water.

== Demographics ==
Historical population
Census	Pop.	Note	%±
1930	515		—
1940	569		10.5%
1950	690		21.3%
1960	712		3.2%
1970	671		−5.8%
1980	913		36.1%
1990	769		−15.8%
2000	709		−7.8%
2010	735		3.7%
2020	638		−13.2%
U.S. Decennial Census

As of the census of 2000, there were 709 people, 249 households, and 176 families residing in the town. By 2020, its population declined to 638.

== Arts and culture ==
The Village Green rail trail offers residents a walking track and playground.
