= Manchester, Georgia =

- City
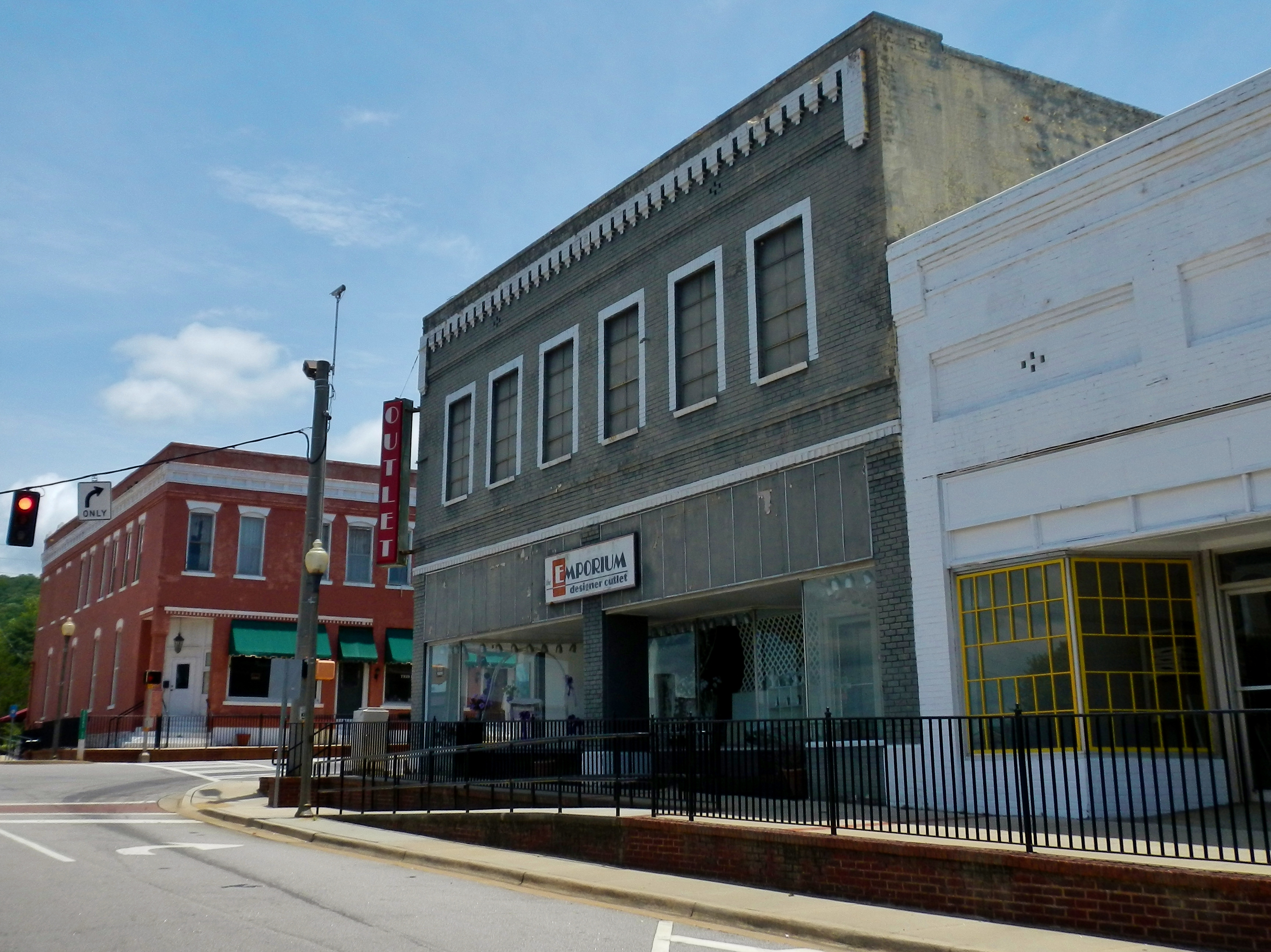
- Manchester in 2012

- Location in Meriwether County and the state of Georgia
- Coordinates: 32°51′22″N 84°37′3″W
- Country: United States
- State: Georgia
- Counties: Meriwether, Talbot

Area
  - Total: 8.05 sq mi (20.85 km^{2})
  - Land: 8.01 sq mi (20.75 km^{2})
  - Water: 0.035 sq mi (0.09 km^{2})
- Elevation: 883 ft (269 m)

Population (2020)
  - Total: 3,584
  - Density: 447.3/sq mi (172.69/km^{2})
- Time zone: UTC-5 (Eastern (EST))
  - Summer (DST): UTC-4 (EDT)
- ZIP code: 31816
- Area code: 706
- FIPS code: 13-49532
- GNIS feature ID: 0317652
- Website: manchester-ga.gov

Manchester is a city in Meriwether and Talbot counties in the U.S. state of Georgia, although primarily in Meriwether. The population was 3,584 at the 2020 census, down from 4,230 in 2010. It is the most populous community in Meriwether County.

The Meriwether portion of the city is in the Atlanta-Sandy Springs-Roswell, GA metropolitan area, while the Talbot portion is in the Columbus, GA-AL metro area, despite Manchester being located 67 and 39 miles respectively from the two central cities of those metro areas.

== History ==
Manchester was founded in 1907 and was incorporated as a city by the Georgia General Assembly in 1909. The city was named after Manchester, England. Manchester has long been known as a railroad town and was originally established when the Atlanta, Birmingham and Atlantic Railway was extended northward to that point and later became the intersection of two major rail lines to the aforementioned two cities. The railroad was merged into the Atlantic Coast Line Railroad in 1946. Even today, the railroad remains an important fixture in Manchester as CSX Transportation maintains a rail yard in the city, newly renovated in 2019.

== Geography ==
Manchester is located in west central Georgia, primarily in southeastern Meriwether County, with a small portion extending south into extreme northern Talbot County. The city is located in the Piedmont physiographic region, with its downtown lying at an elevation of ~900 feet (270 m) above sea level. The ridge of Pine Mountain runs along Manchester's southern edge, rising to an elevation of nearly 1,200 feet (370 m) above sea level.

Georgia State Route 41 and Georgia State Route 85 intersect in the middle of Manchester. Georgia 41 leads southeast 6 miles (10 km) to Woodland and northwest 5 miles (8 km) to Warm Springs. Georgia 41 also connects Manchester to its two county seats, north 15 miles (24 km) to the Meriwether County seat of Greenville and south also 15 miles (24 km) to Talbotton, the Talbot County seat. Georgia 85 heads southwest from Manchester 16 miles (26 km) to Waverly Hall and 39 miles (63 km) to Columbus and north 10 miles (16 km) to Woodbury. Atlanta is 67 miles (108 km) north of Manchester, most directly via Georgia 85 and I-75. Georgia 85 intersects Georgia 190 in the southern part of the city, which leads west 16 miles (26 km) along the scenic Pine Mountain ridge to U.S. Route 27 just south of the city of Pine Mountain.

According to the U.S. Census Bureau, Manchester has a total area of 8.0 square miles (21 km^{2}), of which 0.04 square miles (0.10 km^{2}), or 0.45%, are water.

Manchester is located in the Flint River basin, part of the larger Apalachicola–Chattahoochee–Flint River Basin that covers parts of eastern Alabama, northern and western Georgia, and the Florida Panhandle. Pigeon Creek runs along the northern border of the city, flowing east to the Flint.

== Demographics ==
Historical population
Census	Pop.	Note	%±
1910	922		—
1920	2,776		201.1%
1930	3,745		34.9%
1940	3,462		−7.6%
1950	4,036		16.6%
1960	4,115		2.0%
1970	4,779		16.1%
1980	4,796		0.4%
1990	4,104		−14.4%
2000	3,988		−2.8%
2010	4,230		6.1%
2020	3,584		−15.3%
U.S. Decennial Census; 1850-1870 1880; 1890-1910 1920-1930; 1930-1940 1940-1950; 1960-19801980-2000

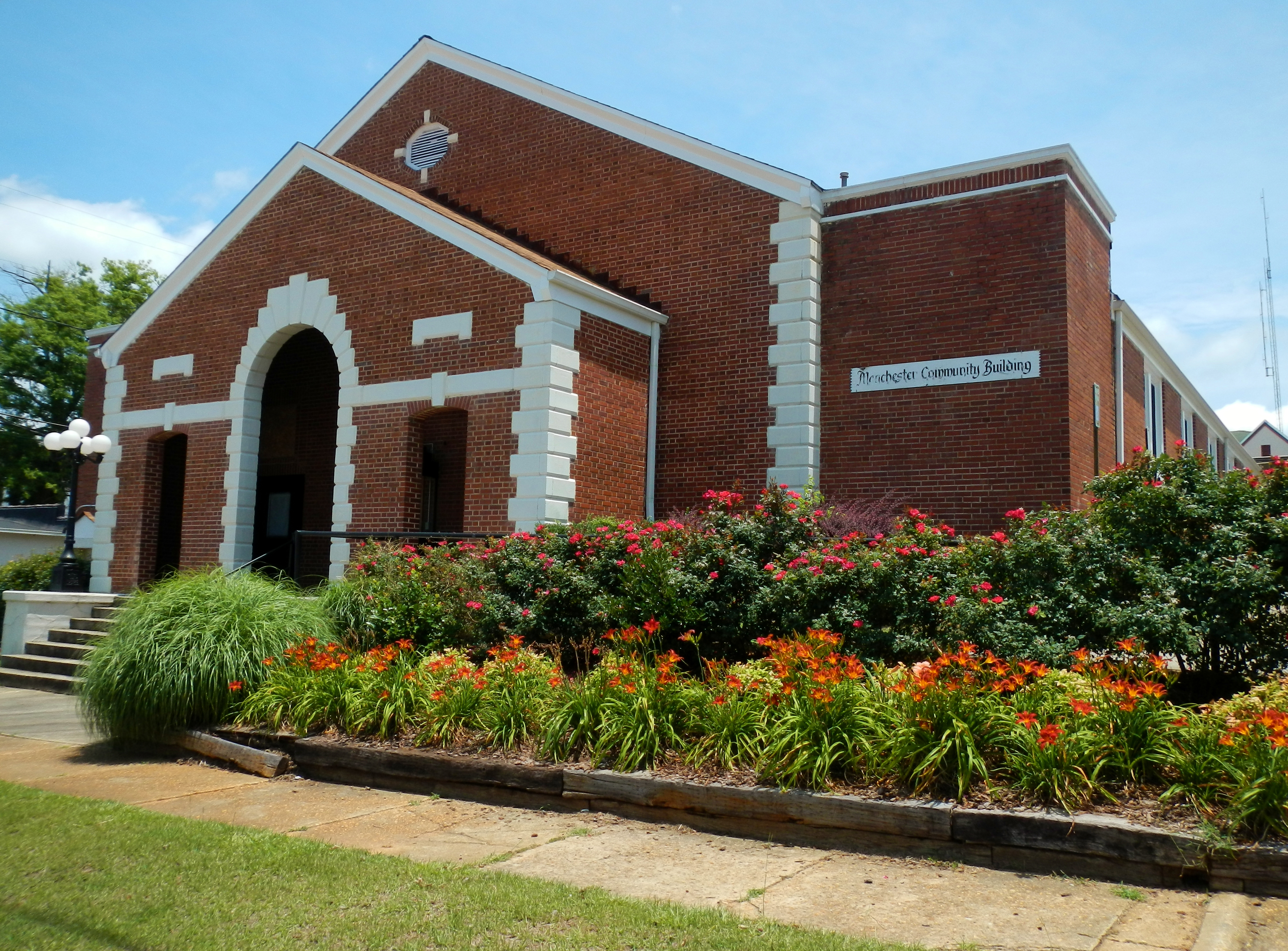
The Manchester Community Building was added to the National Register of Historic Places on January 28, 2002.

=== Racial and ethnic composition ===
Manchester city, Georgia – Racial and ethnic composition Note: the US Census treats Hispanic/Latino as an ethnic category. This table excludes Latinos from the racial categories and assigns them to a separate category. Hispanics/Latinos may be of any race.
Race / Ethnicity (NH = Non-Hispanic)	Pop 2000	Pop 2010	Pop 2020	% 2000	% 2010	% 2020
White alone (NH)	2,232	1,997	1,666	55.97%	47.21%	46.48%
Black or African American alone (NH)	1,676	2,042	1,713	42.03%	48.27%	47.80%
Native American or Alaska Native alone (NH)	13	6	3	0.33%	0.14%	0.08%
Asian alone (NH)	26	80	19	0.65%	1.89%	0.53%
Native Hawaiian or Pacific Islander alone (NH)	0	0	2	0.00%	0.00%	0.06%
Other race alone (NH)	2	5	5	0.05%	0.12%	0.14%
Mixed race or Multiracial (NH)	19	28	103	0.48%	0.66%	2.87%
Hispanic or Latino (any race)	20	72	73	0.50%	1.70%	2.04%
Total	3,988	4,230	3,584	100.00%	100.00%	100.00%

=== 2020 census ===
As of the 2020 census, Manchester had a population of 3,584. The median age was 39.8 years. 24.1% of residents were under the age of 18 and 18.9% of residents were 65 years of age or older. For every 100 females there were 78.6 males, and for every 100 females age 18 and over there were 73.0 males age 18 and over.

There were 1,509 households in Manchester, of which 29.0% had children under the age of 18 living in them. Of all households, 31.5% were married-couple households, 17.8% were households with a male householder and no spouse or partner present, and 44.7% were households with a female householder and no spouse or partner present. About 35.6% of all households were made up of individuals and 15.8% had someone living alone who was 65 years of age or older.

There were 1,728 housing units, of which 12.7% were vacant. The homeowner vacancy rate was 2.7% and the rental vacancy rate was 7.9%.

== Education ==
Residents in Meriwether County are in the Meriwether County School District.

Residents in Talbot County are in the Talbot County School District.

== Notable people ==
- Bill Mathis, former Clemson and Super Bowl-winning New York Jets football player
- Stuart Woods, novelist. Manchester, dubbed Delano, was the setting for his first best-seller, Chiefs, and most of his subsequent books have a character who comes from the city.
