= Henry H. Lowe =

American state legislator (1795–1854)

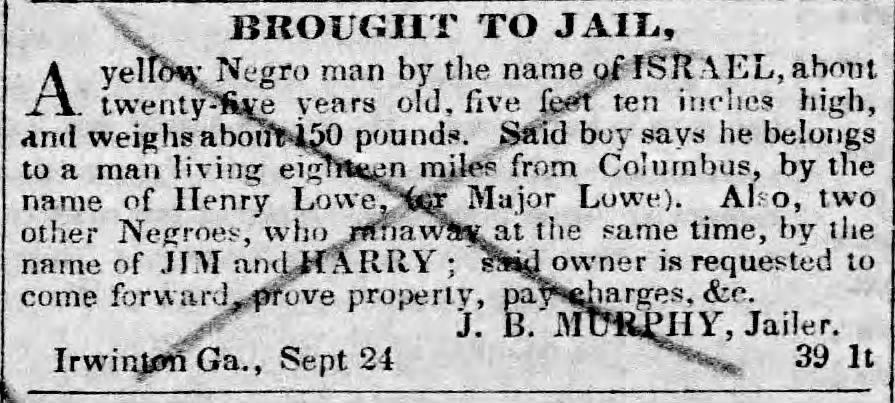
"Brought to Jail" Weekly Columbus Enquirer, September 23, 1850

Henry H. Lowe (August 4, 1795 – July 8, 1854) was a land and slave owner, state legislator, and state militia officer in Harris County, Georgia, United States.

Lowe represented Harris County in the Georgia House of Representatives in 1829 and 1832. In 1829 he was involved in establishing and marketing the town of Hamilton, Georgia on what had been Muscogee land until it was ceded in 1826. He lived at Ossahatchie, a plantation built in the 1830s by his slaves. The mansion, described as "luxurious," was located near Ossahatchie Creek close to today's Georgia State Route 85. In 1831 he was a cofounder of the Insurance Bank of Columbus, Georgia.

The governor of Georgia appointed him a brigadier general of state militia during the Creek War of 1836. In 1842 he sued the Chattahoochee Railway Company for a modest sum of money. Lowe was the chairman of the Democratic Party (Second Party System) of Harris County in 1845. Lowe resigned as a general officer of the Georgia militia in 1848.

Lowe hosted a banquet for James K. Polk at the house on March 14, 1849. At the time of the 1850 U.S. federal census, Lowe listed his occupation as farmer, and told the enumerator that he owned real estate valued at US$250,000 (equivalent to $9,675,000 in 2025). Lowe had two entries on the 1850 slave schedules, indicating he owned two physically distinct properties. All 34 slaves attached to one of the properties were male, according to the enumerator, and ranged in age from five to 70 years old. There were 65 people enslaved on to Lowe's second property. Elmore H. Simmons, a slave trader who was enumerated as part of Lowe's household, was listed as the legal owner of another 68 slaves.

== See also ==
- Title and rank in the antebellum U.S. South
