= Harris County School District =

School district in Georgia (U.S. state)

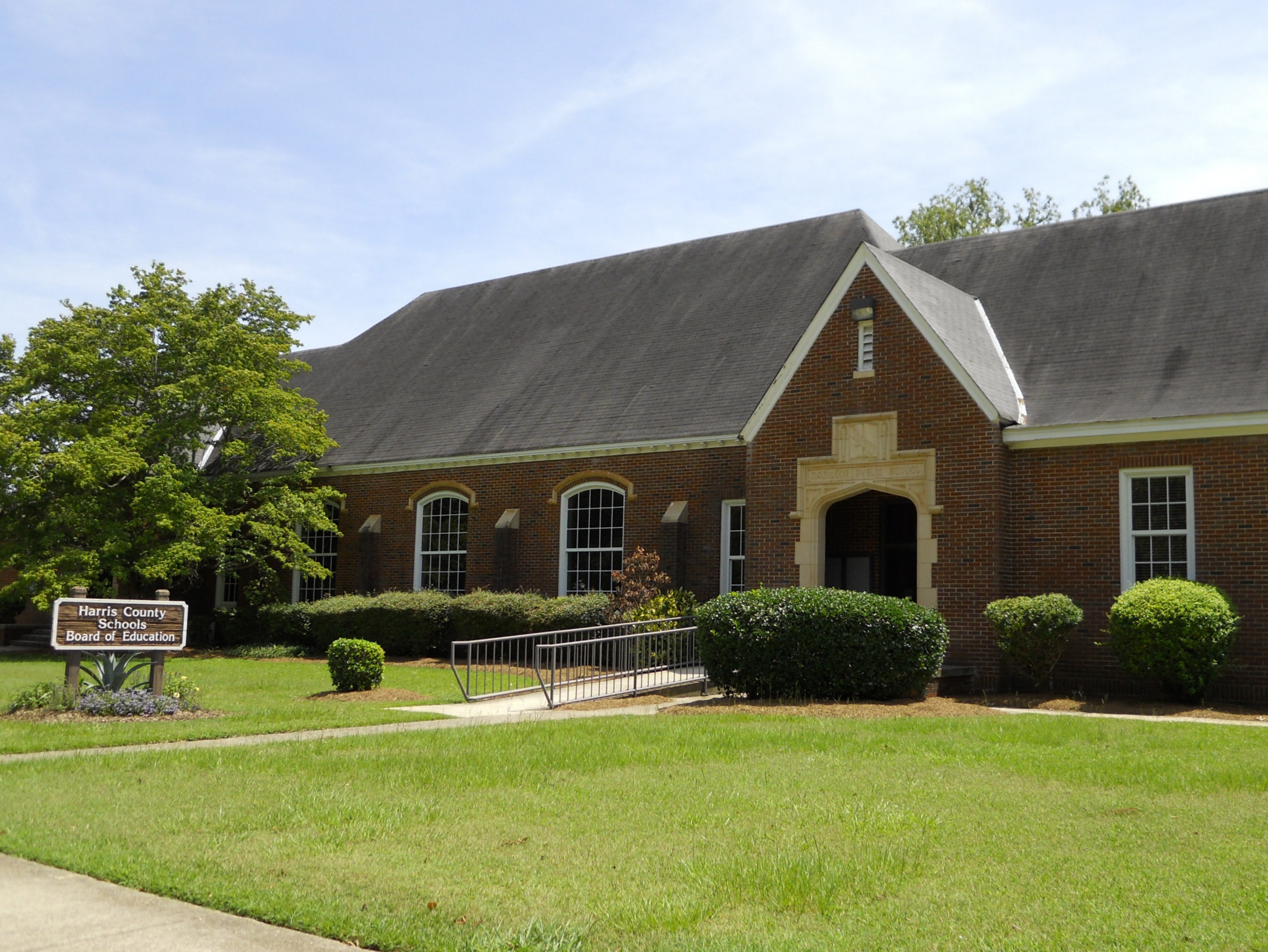

Address
- 132 Barnes Mill Road Hamilton, Georgia, 31811-5418; United States
- Coordinates: 32.758587°N 84.871252°W

District information
- Grades: Pre-school - 12
- Accreditation(s): Southern Association of Colleges and Schools; Georgia Accrediting Commission

Students and staff
- Enrollment: 5,400 (2018)
- Faculty: 274

Other information
- Telephone: (706) 628-4206
- Fax: (706) 628-5609
- Website: www.harris.k12.ga.us

The Harris County School District is a public school district in Harris County, Georgia, United States, based in Hamilton. It serves the communities of Cataula, Ellerslie, Fortson, Hamilton, Hopewell, Pine Mountain, Shiloh, Waverly Hall, and West Point.

== Schools ==
The Harris County School District has four elementary schools, one intermediate school, one middle school, and one high school.

=== Elementary schools ===
- Mulberry Creek Elementary School
- New Mountain Hill Elementary School
- Park Elementary School
- Pine Ridge Elementary School

=== Middle school ===
- Creekside Intermediate School (grades 5 and 6)
- Harris County Carver Middle School

=== High school ===
- Harris County High School
