= Derrius Brooks =

American gridiron football player (born 1988)

No. 2
- Position: Defensive back

Personal information
- Born: May 29, 1988 (age 38); Columbus, Georgia, U.S.
- Listed height: 5 ft 10 in (1.78 m)
- Listed weight: 191 lb (87 kg)

Career information
- High school: Harris County (Hamilton, Georgia)
- College: Western Kentucky
- NFL draft: 2012: undrafted

Career history
- Cincinnati Bengals (2012)*; Calgary Stampeders (2012–2013); New Orleans Saints (2014)*; Tampa Bay Buccaneers (2014)*; Saskatchewan Roughriders (2016)*; Hamilton Tiger-Cats (2016); Columbus Lions (2017)
- * Offseason or practice squad member only

Awards and highlights
- Second-team All-Sun Belt (2011)
- Stats at Pro Football Reference
- Stats at CFL.ca

Derrius Brooks (born May 29, 1988) is an American former professional football defensive back. He played college football at Western Kentucky University. He was also a member of the Cincinnati Bengals, Calgary Stampeders, New Orleans Saints, Tampa Bay Buccaneers, Saskatchewan Roughriders, Hamilton Tiger-Cats, and Columbus Lions.

== Early life ==
Brooks attended Harris County High School in Hamilton, Georgia.

== Professional career ==
Pre-draft measurables
Height	Weight	40-yard dash	10-yard split	20-yard split	20-yard shuttle	Three-cone drill	Vertical jump	Broad jump	Bench press
5 ft 9 in (1.75 m)	192 lb (87 kg)	4.35 s	1.46 s	2.38 s	4.17 s	6.61 s	38 in (0.97 m)	10 ft 5 in (3.18 m)	13 reps
All values from Western Kentucky Pro Day

=== Cincinnati Bengals ===
Brooks was signed by the Cincinnati Bengals of the National Football League (NFL) on May 2, 2012, after going undrafted in the 2012 NFL draft. He was released by the Bengals on May 11, 2012.

=== Calgary Stampeders ===
Brooks signed with the CFL's Calgary Stampeders on July 20, 2012. He played for the Stampeders during the 2012 and 2013 CFL seasons, making 20 appearances during those two seasons and contributing 50 tackles, 9 special teams tackles and 5 interceptions.

=== New Orleans Saints ===
Brooks was signed by the New Orleans Saints of the NFL on January 2, 2014. He was released by the Saints on August 30, 2014.

=== Tampa Bay Buccaneers ===
On September 1, 2014, Brooks was signed to the practice squad of the Tampa Bay Buccaneers of the NFL. His contract expired on January 5, 2015.

=== Saskatchewan Roughriders ===
The Saskatchewan Roughriders of the CFL announced the signing of Brooks on January 11, 2016. He was released by the Riders on October 3, 2016, having never played a snap for them.

=== Hamilton Tiger-Cats ===
On October 10, 2016, Brooks signed with the Hamilton Tiger-Cats of the CFL, and appeared in 3 games in the months of October and November 2016. Brooks was taken to the hospital after being taken off the field on a stretcher, however all the tests came back negative and he was released from the hospital later that night. He was released by the Tiger-Cats in the week leading up to their first playoff game.

=== Columbus Lions ===
In December 2016, Brooks signed with the Columbus Lions of the National Arena League. On May 18, 2017, Brooks was released.
