= Jordan Jenkins =

American football player (born 1994)

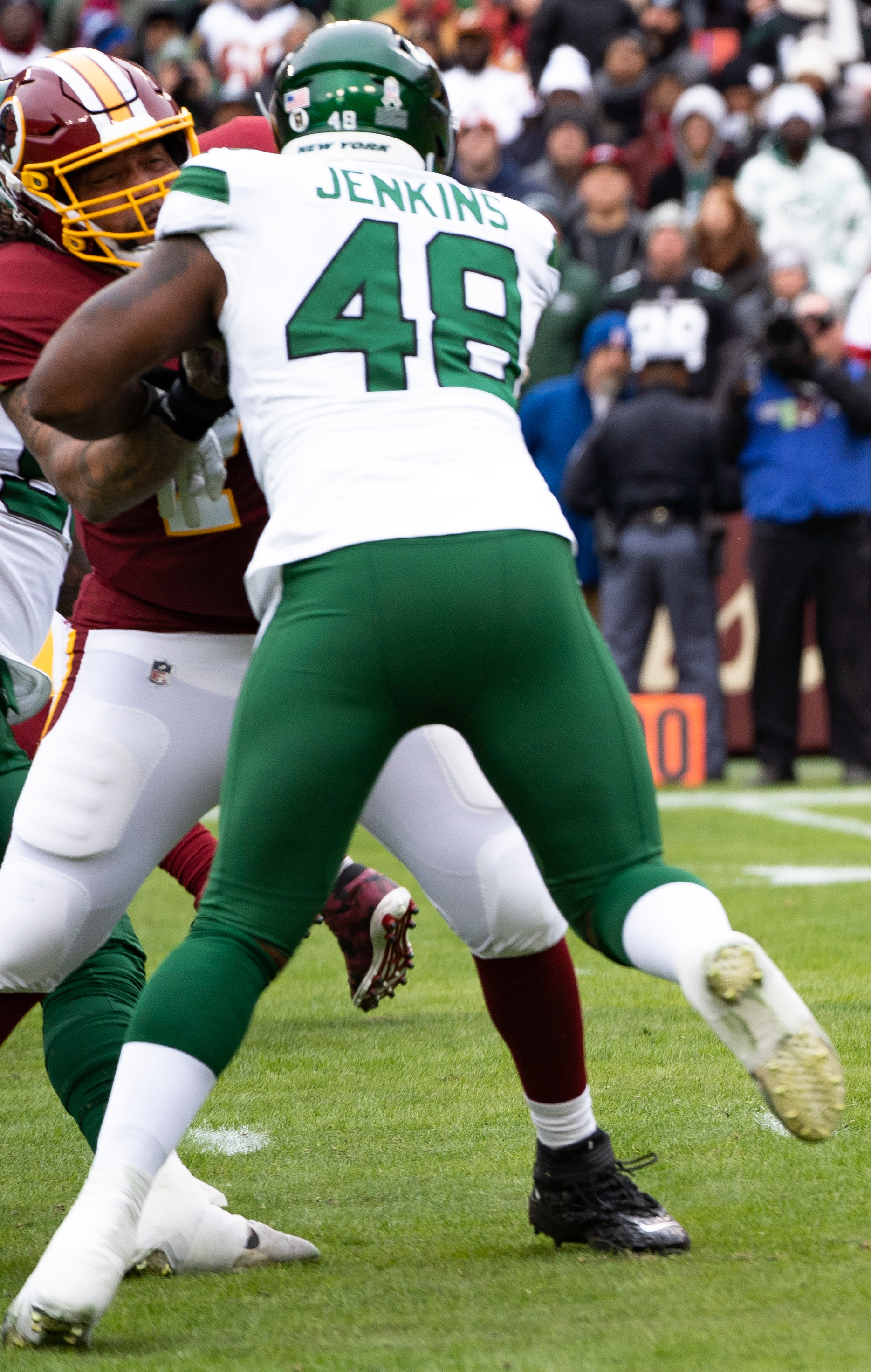
- Jenkins with the New York Jets in 2019

No. 48, 50
- Position: Defensive end

Personal information
- Born: July 1, 1994 (age 32); Houston, Texas, U.S.
- Listed height: 6 ft 3 in (1.91 m)
- Listed weight: 260 lb (118 kg)

Career information
- High school: Harris County (Hamilton, Georgia)
- College: Georgia
- NFL draft: 2016: 3rd round, 83rd overall pick

Career history
- New York Jets (2016–2020); Houston Texans (2021); Las Vegas Raiders (2022)

Awards and highlights
- Second-team All-SEC (2013)

Career NFL statistics
- Total tackles: 209
- Sacks: 25
- Forced fumbles: 7
- Fumble recoveries: 5
- Pass deflections: 8
- Stats at Pro Football Reference

Jordan Montae Jenkins (born July 1, 1994) is an American former professional football player who was a defensive end in the National Football League (NFL). He played college football for the Georgia Bulldogs and was selected by the New York Jets of the National Football League (NFL) in the third round of the 2016 NFL draft.

== Early life ==
Jenkins attended Harris County High School in Hamilton, Georgia. He was a four-star recruit by Rivals.com and was rated among the top defensive end recruits in his class. He committed to the University of Georgia to play college football.

== College career ==
As a true freshman at Georgia in 2012, Jenkins played in 14 games and made six starts at outside linebacker. He recorded 31 tackles and five sacks. As a 13-game starter his sophomore year in 2013, Jenkins had 45 tackles and five sacks. Jenkins again started all 13 games his junior year in 2014, recording 70 tackles and five sacks. After he considered entering the 2015 NFL draft, Jenkins announced that he would return for his senior year.

== Professional career ==
=== Pre-draft ===
Coming out of Georgia, Jenkins was considered one of the top linebacker prospects and received an invitation to the NFL Combine. He attended the combine and completed the majority of drills until he suffered a hamstring injury that made him unable to perform the short shuttle and three-cone drill. Coincidentally, teammate Leonard Floyd also injured his hamstring at the combine and was unable to perform the three-cone and short shuttle. On March 16, 2016, he opted to participate at Georgia's pro day, along with Floyd, Malcolm Mitchell, John Theus, Keith Marshall, Marshall Morgan, Sterling Bailey, Quayvon Hicks, and ten other players. Jenkins completed the short shuttle and three-cone drill, while also running positional drills and lowering his time in the 40-yard dash. He also elevated his vertical to 38" and increased his number of reps on the bench press to 19. He was projected to be a third round pick by the majority of NFL draft experts and scouts. After he completed the pre-draft process, Jenkins was ranked as the eighth best linebacker prospect in the draft by NFL analyst Mike Mayock, the ninth best outside linebacker by NFLDraftScout.com, the ninth best linebacker by ESPN, and was ranked the 11th best linebacker by Sports Illustrated.

Pre-draft measurables
Height	Weight	Arm length	Hand span	40-yard dash	10-yard split	20-yard split	20-yard shuttle	Three-cone drill	Vertical jump	Broad jump	Bench press
6 ft 2 5/8 in (1.90 m)	259 lb (117 kg)	34 1/4 in (0.87 m)	11 1/4 in (0.29 m)	4.80 s	1.58 s	2.71 s	4.32 s	7.39 s	38.0 in (0.97 m)	10 ft 3 in (3.12 m)	19 reps
All values from NFL Combine/Georgia's Pro Day

=== New York Jets ===
==== 2016 ====
Jenkins was selected by the New York Jets in the third round (83rd overall) in the 2016 NFL draft. Jenkins was the second linebacker drafted by the Jets in 2016 behind Darron Lee (first round, 20th overall) and was the ninth linebacker selected in the entire draft. Fellow Georgia linebacker and teammate, Leonard Floyd, was selected in the first round (ninth overall) by the Chicago Bears. He competed with Trevor Reilly, Lorenzo Mauldin, and Deion Barnes throughout training camp for one of the jobs as starting outside linebacker. Head coach Todd Bowles named him one of the starting outside linebackers to start the season, opposite Mauldin.

He suffered a calf injury in mid-August and was unable to play in the first two games of the season. On September 25, 2016, Jenkins made his professional regular season debut and first career start, recording five combined tackles in a 24–3 loss to the Kansas City Chiefs. During a Week 14 matchup against the San Francisco 49ers, he recorded four combined tackles and was credited with a half a sack on Colin Kaepernick in the Jets' 23–17 overtime victory. The next game, Jenkins collected five combined tackles and made his first career solo sack on Miami Dolphins quarterback Matt Moore, as the Jets lost 34–13. Jenkins finished the 2016 season with 41 combined tackles (23 solo), 2.5 sacks, a forced fumble and two passes defensed in 11 starts and 14 games.

==== 2017 ====
Jenkins returned as the de facto outside linebacker under Bowles to start the 2017 season. In the Jets' season-opener at the Buffalo Bills, Jenkins recorded a season-high four solo tackles in the Jets' 12–21 loss. On November 2, 2017, he earned two solo tackles, sacked Bills quarterback Tyrod Taylor twice, and forced the first fumble of his career, as the Jets won 34–21 on Thursday Night Football. He was named the American Football Conference Defensive Player of the Week for his performance in Week 9.

==== 2020 ====
On March 23, 2020, the Jets signed Jenkins to a one-year, $3.75 million contract that included $3.25 million guaranteed and a signing bonus of $1.75 million. On December 16, 2020, Jenkins was placed on injured reserve.

=== Houston Texans ===
On March 29, 2021, Jenkins signed a two-year, $6 million contract, which could be pushed up to $8 million, with the Houston Texans. Before this move, Jenkins was the last remaining Jets player from the 2016 Draft and the longest-tenured player on the team. He suffered a torn PCL in Week 11 and was placed on injured reserve on November 27, 2021. He was activated on December 18. He was released on August 15, 2022.

=== Las Vegas Raiders ===
On August 17, 2022, Jenkins signed with the Las Vegas Raiders. On August 21, 2022, Jenkins was placed on injured reserve with a torn ACL.
