= Antioch, Harris County, Georgia =

Antioch, Georgia
- Unincorporated community Census-designated place
- Location within Georgia Location within the United States
- Coordinates: 32°40′35″N 85°3′34″W
- Country: United States
- State: Georgia
- County: Harris

Area
  - Total: 2.69 sq mi (6.97 km^{2})
  - Land: 2.56 sq mi (6.63 km^{2})
  - Water: 0.14 sq mi (0.35 km^{2})
- Elevation: 597 ft (182 m)

Population (2020)
  - Total: 613
  - Density: 239.64/sq mi (92.53/km^{2})
- Time zone: UTC-5 (Eastern (EST))
  - Summer (DST): UTC-4 (EDT)
- ZIP Code: 31808 (Fortson); 31811 (Hamilton)
- Area codes: 706/762
- FIPS code: 13-02364
- GNIS feature ID: 2813337

Antioch is an unincorporated community and census-designated place (CDP) in southwestern Harris County, Georgia, United States. It is on Georgia State Route 219, 17 miles (27 km) north of Columbus and 26 miles (42 km) south of LaGrange. Per the 2020 U.S. census, its population was 613.

== Demographics ==
Historical population
Census	Pop.	Note	%±
2020	613		—
U.S. Decennial Census; 1850-1870 1870-1880; 1890-1910 1920-1930; 1940 1950 1960; 1970 1980 1990; 2000 2020

Antioch was first listed as a census designated place in the 2020 census.

=== 2020 census ===
Antioch CDP, Georgia – racial and ethnic composition Note: the US Census treats Hispanic/Latino as an ethnic category. This table excludes Latinos from the racial categories and assigns them to a separate category. Hispanics/Latinos may be of any race.
Race / ethnicity (NH = Non-Hispanic)	Pop 2020	% 2020
White alone (NH)	482	78.63%
Black or African American alone (NH)	44	7.18%
Native American or Alaska Native alone (NH)	0	0.00%
Asian alone (NH)	15	2.45%
Pacific Islander alone (NH)	0	0.00%
Other race alone (NH)	2	0.33%
Mixed-race or multiracial (NH)	29	4.73%
Hispanic or Latino (any race)	41	6.69%
Total	613	100.00%
