= Kings Gap (Georgia) =

Valley in Georgia, United States

Coordinates: 32°50′26.47″N 84°48′31.75″W

Kings Gap is a valley located in Harris County, Georgia, United States. The valley is found between the cities of Pine Mountain and Shiloh.

Kings Gap was named after a rural trader surnamed King who operated in the area.
