= Mulberry Creek (Chattahoochee River tributary) =

Stream in Harris and Talbot County, U.S.

Coordinates: 32°37′49″N 85°04′52″W

Mulberry Creek is a stream in the U.S. state of Georgia that flows through Harris and Talbot counties in the west central part of the state. It is a tributary to the Chattahoochee River.

== Name ==
The name of the creek is of Native American origin. "Cataula" is a name derived from the Muskogee language meaning "dead mulberry". Variant names have included "Cataula Creek", "Cataulee Creek", "Cautaulee Creek", "Ketale Creek", and "Ketalee Creek".

== Course ==
The creek begins as a tributary off of the Chattahoochee River south of Lake Harding in western Harris County. It begins flowing northeast, crossing Georgia State Route 219 south of Antioch. It continues northeast, crossing Mountain Hill Rd near New Mountain Hill Elementary School. Here, it turns to the north, and then to the east, where it crosses Interstate 185 between exits 19 and 25. From here it continues east, crossing more local roads before turning northeast again and crossing U.S. Route 27 south of Hamilton. It then begins to narrow as curves back to the east, crossing more local roads as well as U.S. Route 27 Alternate north of Waverly Hall before curving to the north and ending in a small lake just inside Talbot County.

== Crossings ==
The following major roads cross over the creek:

- Harris County:
  - Georgia State Route 219 near Antioch
  - Interstate 185 at MM 21
  - U.S. Route 27 south of Hamilton
  - U.S. Route 27 Alternate/Georgia State Route 85 north of Waverly Hall

== Tributaries ==
- Ossahatchie Creek
