= HCSD =

HCSD may refer to:

- Hall County School District (Georgia)
- Hamburg Community School District (Iowa)
- Hamilton City School District (Ohio)
- Harbor Creek School District (Pennsylvania)
- Harney County School District 3 (Oregon)
- Harris County School District (Georgia)
- Harrison Central School District (New York)
- Harrison County School District (Mississippi)
- Hillsborough City School District (California)
- Hudson City School District; Hudson, New York
- Hudson City School District; Hudson, Ohio (Ohio)
- Humboldt County School District (Nevada)
