= National Register of Historic Places listings in Harris County, Georgia =

This is a list of properties and districts in Harris County, Georgia, that are listed on the National Register of Historic Places (NRHP).

This National Park Service list is complete through NPS recent listings posted December 12, 2025.

== Current listings ==
	Name on the Register	Image	Date listed	Location	City or town	Description
1	Bethlehem Baptist Church Colored School	Bethlehem Baptist Church Colored School	December 30, 2008 (#08001246)	200 Bethlehem Dr. 32°48′19″N 84°46′55″W	Pine Mountain Valley	
2	Cason and Virginia Callaway House		July 5, 2002 (#02000713)	5929 State Route 116; 32°45′12″N 84°55′30″W	Hamilton	
3	Chipley-Pine Mountain Town Hall	Chipley-Pine Mountain Town Hall	April 17, 1986 (#86000796)	McDougal Ave. 32°51′59″N 84°51′15″W	Pine Mountain	
4	William and Ann Copeland Jr. House	William and Ann Copeland Jr. House	December 4, 2008 (#08000969)	19444 State Route 116; 32°47′40″N 84°44′14″W	Shiloh	
5	Welcome P. Duke Log House	Welcome P. Duke Log House	July 23, 1999 (#99000803)	312 Duke Rd. 32°45′12″N 84°50′53″W	Hamilton	The Welcome P. Duke Log House has since been dismantled.
6	Hamilton Baptist Church and Pastorium	Hamilton Baptist Church and Pastorium	August 19, 1982 (#82002448)	State Route 116 and Clay St. 32°45′26″N 84°52′35″W	Hamilton	
7	Harris County Courthouse	Harris County Courthouse	September 18, 1980 (#80001089)	Courthouse Sq. 32°45′31″N 84°52′29″W	Hamilton	
8	Langdale Historic District	Langdale Historic District	November 12, 1999 (#99001299)	Vicinity of Valley, Alabama; 32°48′48″N 85°10′00″W	Hopewell	Extends into Chambers County, Alabama
9	Mountain Hill District Consolidated School	Mountain Hill District Consolidated School	December 31, 1998 (#98001558)	47 Mountain Hill Rd., jct. with GA 219; 32°41′47″N 85°01′30″W	Hamilton	
10	Pine Mountain State Park	Pine Mountain State Park	September 25, 1997 (#97001273)	2790 Georgia Hwy. 190; 32°49′55″N 84°48′29″W	Pine Mountain	National Historic Landmark and a Georgia State Park
11	Riverview Historic District	Riverview Historic District	November 12, 1999 (#99001300)	Vicinity of Valley, Alabama; 32°47′33″N 85°08′32″W	Hopewell	Extends into Chambers County, Alabama
12	Story-Hadley House	Story-Hadley House	October 22, 2002 (#02001217)	2626 Hadley Rd. 32°49′32″N 84°58′04″W	Pine Mountain	Otherwise known as Sweet Home Plantation.
13	Sunnyside School-Midway Baptist Church and Midway Cemetery Historic District	Sunnyside School-Midway Baptist Church and Midway Cemetery Historic District	September 9, 1999 (#99001101)	2495 Hopewell Church Rd. at Sunnyside Church Rd. 32°49′09″N 84°59′05″W	Hamilton	
14	Thornton Plantation	Thornton Plantation	October 29, 2004 (#04001212)	702 Piedmont Lake Rd. and 404 Hopkins Farm Rd. 32°48′32″N 84°59′47″W	Pine Mountain	
15	White Hall	White Hall	August 19, 1974 (#74000689)	Off U.S. 29; 32°52′12″N 85°10′27″W	West Point	Greek Revival-style plantation home. Built in 1857.
16	Whitesville Methodist Episcopal Church, South, and Cemetery	Whitesville Methodist Episcopal Church, South, and Cemetery	February 22, 2002 (#02000077)	4731 Pine Lake Rd. 32°49′11″N 85°02′07″W	Whitesville	
