= Ossahatchie, Georgia =

Ossahatchie
- Unincorporated community
- Location within Georgia Location within the United States
- Coordinates: 32°39′14″N 84°46′36″W
- Country: United States
- State: Georgia
- County: Harris
- Elevation: 630 ft (192 m)
- Time zone: UTC-5 (Eastern (EST))
  - Summer (DST): UTC-4 (EDT)
- ZIP code: 31807
- Area code: 706
- GNIS feature ID: 356452

Ossahatchie is a placename in Harris County, Georgia, United States. Ossahatchie is derived from either the Muscogee language, meaning "pokeweed creek," or from the Mikasuki language, meaning "raccoon creek".

== History ==
In the 1880s, Ossahatchie was a local picnic destination known for "its beautiful groves, running stream of clear water" and a large, dedicated picnic "platform." Ossahatchie and Ossahatchie Spur were stops on a Southern Railway line between Columbus and McDonough. Ossahatchie was originally a plantation built in the 1830s by the slaves of state legislator and militia officer Henry H. Lowe. The mansion, described as "luxurious," was located near Ossahatchie Creek close to today's Georgia State Route 85. Lowe hosted a banquet for James K. Polk at the house on March 14, 1849. As of 1922, the "old Lowe property" was 330 acres and had a storehouse. The main house burned in 1945.

As of 1964 there was an Ossahatchie Motel.

== Geography ==
The community is located approximately halfway between Ellerslie and Waverly Hall along U.S. Route 27 Alternate and Georgia State Route 85 at its junction with Ossahatchie Creek Rd.

== See also ==
- E. H. Simmons
