= Ossahatchie Creek =

Creek in the state of Georgia, USA

Coordinates: 32°41′30.49″N 84°53′5.75″W

Ossahatchie Creek is a stream in the U.S. state of Georgia that runs through Harris and Talbot counties in the west central part of the state. It is a tributary to Mulberry Creek.

== Name ==
Ossahatchie is a name derived from the Muscogee language meaning "Pokeweed Creek".

Many variant names have been recorded, including:

- Osahatchee Creek
- Osahatchi Creek
- Osauhatchee Creek
- Osawhatchee Creek
- Osohatchee Creek
- Osouhatchee Creek
- Ossahatchee Creek
- Ossohatchee Creek
- Sawhatchee Creek
- Sowachee Creek
- Sowahachee Creek

== Crossings ==
The following roads cross the creek:

- Harris County:
  - U.S. Route 27 north of Cataula
  - Denney Rd northeast of Cataula
  - Harris Rd north of Ellerslie
  - U.S. Route 27 Alternate/Georgia State Route 85 between Ellerslie and Waverly Hall
  - Mount Airy Rd south of Waverly Hall
  - Ridgeway Rd south of Waverly Hall
