= Harris County Courthouse =

Harris County Courthouse may refer to:

- Harris County Courthouse (Georgia), Hamilton, Georgia
- Harris County Civil Courthouse, Houston, Texas
- Harris County Criminal Justice Center, Houston, Texas
- 1910 Harris County Courthouse, Houston, Texas
