= Harris County Courthouse (Georgia) =

- U.S. National Register of Historic Places
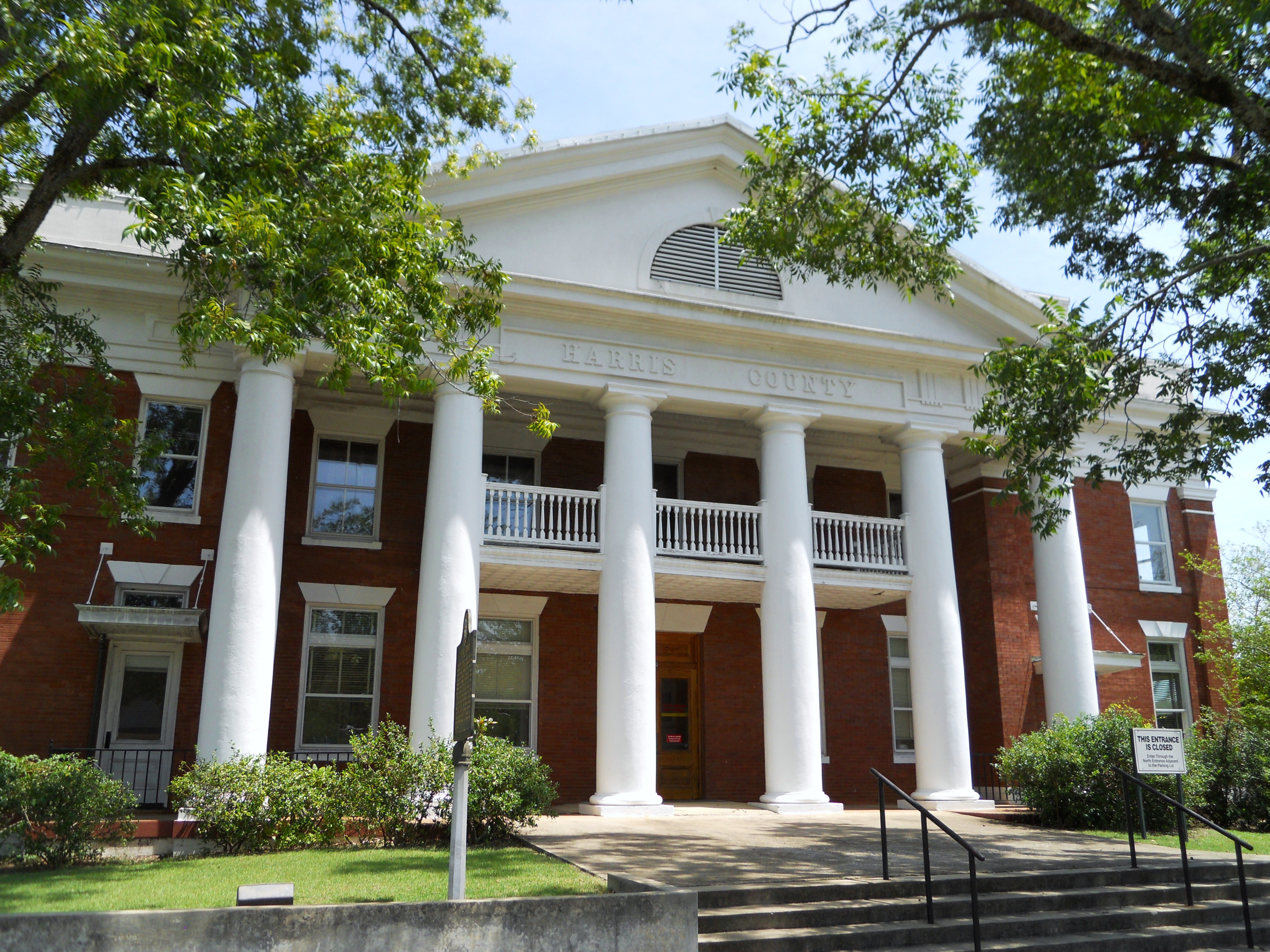
- Harris County Courthouse in 2011

- Location within Georgia Location within the United States
- Location: Hamilton, Georgia
- Coordinates: 32°45′31″N 84°52′29″W
- Built: 1908
- Architect: Edward Columbus Hosford; builder = Mutual Construction Company
- Architectural style: Classical Revival
- MPS: Georgia County Courthouses TR
- NRHP reference No.: 80001089
- Added to NRHP: September 18, 1980

The Harris County Courthouse is a historic courthouse building located in Hamilton, Georgia. Built in 1908, it was designed by Georgia-born American architect Edward Columbus Hosford. He is noted for his designs of courthouses and other buildings found in Florida, Georgia and Texas. Harris County's was the second courthouse he had ever designed.

On September 18, 1980, the building was added to the National Register of Historic Places.

== See also ==
- National Register of Historic Places listings in Harris County, Georgia
- Harris County Courthouse (disambiguation)
