= Mountain Hill, Georgia =

Unincorporated community in Georgia, U.S.

Coordinates: 32°43′23″N 85°01′22″W

Mountain Hill is an unincorporated community in Harris County, in the U.S. state of Georgia.

== History ==
A post office called Mountain Hill was established in 1853, and remained in operation until 1904. According to tradition, the community was so named because a first settler liked mountains. A variant name was "Talleytown".
