= Lake Harding =

- Bartlett's Ferry Lake
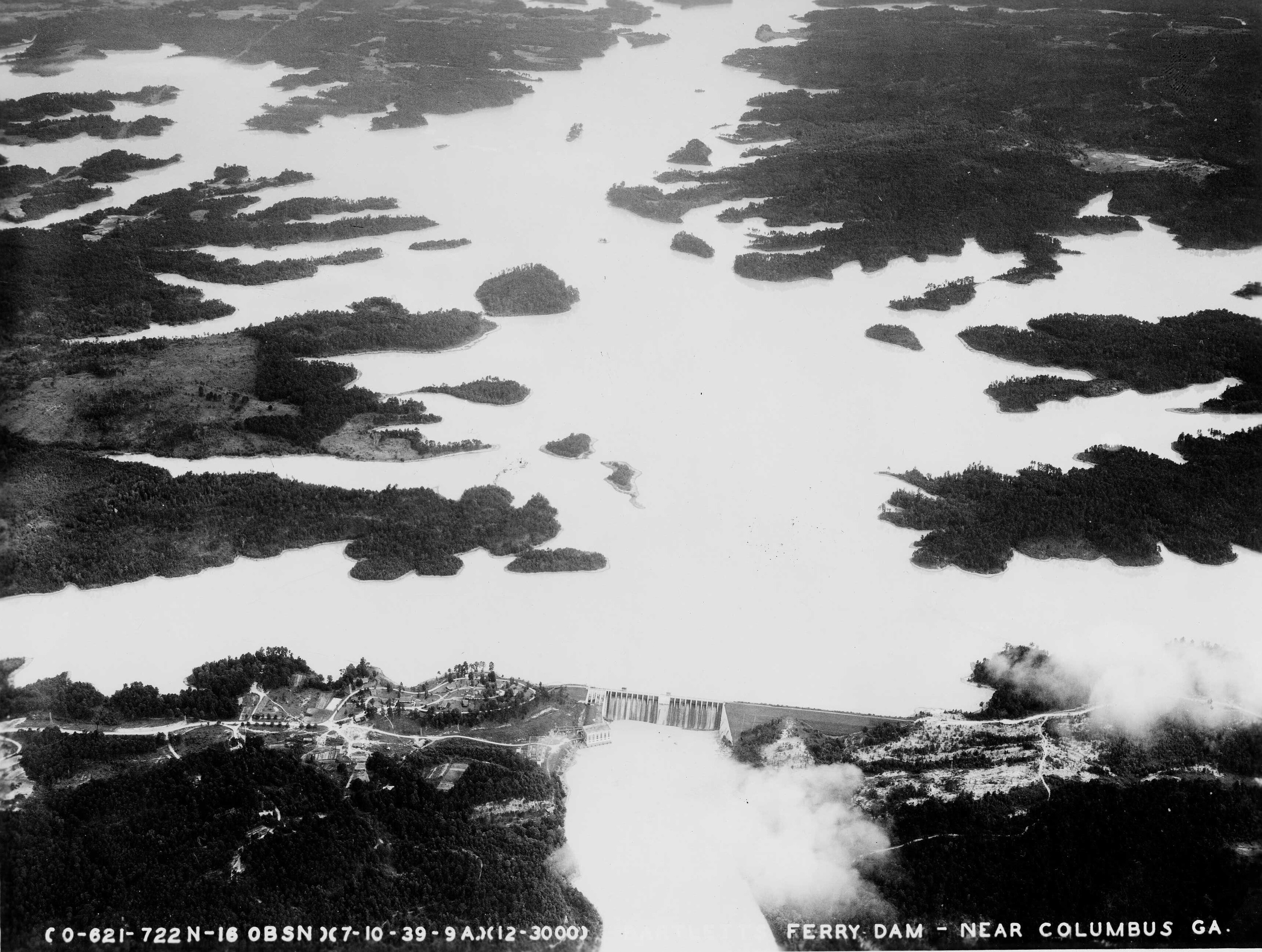
- Bartlett's Ferry Dam and Lake Harding

- Location within Alabama Location within Georgia Location within the United States
- Location: Harris County, Georgia / Lee County, Alabama, US
- Coordinates: 32.663°N 85.091°W
- Type: reservoir
- Primary inflows: Chattahoochee River
- Primary outflows: Chattahoochee River
- Basin countries: United States
- Surface area: 5,850 acres (23.7 km^{2})
- Average depth: 32 ft (9.8 m)
- Max. depth: 111 ft (34 m)
- Shore length^{1}: 156 mi (251 km)
- Surface elevation: 521 feet (159 m)
- Islands: several (Houston's Island)
- Website: https://lakehardingassociation.org
- ^{1} Shore length is not a well-defined measure.

Lake Harding, also known as Bartlett's Ferry Lake, is a 5,850-acre (23.7 km^{2}) reservoir on the Chattahoochee River. The lake is formed by Bartlett's Ferry Dam, and the border between Georgia and Alabama traverses the main channel along the western side of the lake. The Georgia side lies entirely within Harris County while the Alabama shoreline's entirety is in Lee County. Lake Harding is a deep lake with a depth of over 100 feet (30 m) at the dam itself.

The lake was originally built by the Columbus Power Company in 1926 to generate hydroelectric power. The lake was named after R.M. Harding, a power company official. The dam and lake were bought by Georgia Power in 1930.

Over the years, Lake Harding has become a popular recreational area with local residents from the Columbus metro area, many of whom have built lake homes along the well-developed shoreline on both the Alabama and Georgia sides of the lake.

Three major tributaries flow into the lake. On the Alabama side, Osanippa Creek rises near Cusseta in southern Chambers County and flows southeast into the northern end of the lake, while Halawakee Creek rises near Oak Bowery, also in southern Chambers County, and then flows east through northeastern Lee County and the northern fringes of Opelika before deepening and widening greatly prior to its junction with the lake. On the Georgia side, Mountain Oak Creek flows out of Piedmont Lake near Whitesville in Harris County southwestward into the lake, with its mouth nearly due east of the mouth of Osanippa Creek on the Alabama side.

Lake Harding features several islands. One of the most notable is Huston's Island, which contains the ruins of an old lake house.

Lake Harding is the practice site of the Auburn University Club Rowing Team. The team can frequently be seen practicing on early weekday mornings.
