= Sunnyside School–Midway Baptist Church and Midway Cemetery Historic District =

Historic church in Georgia, United States

- U.S. National Register of Historic Places
- U.S. Historic district
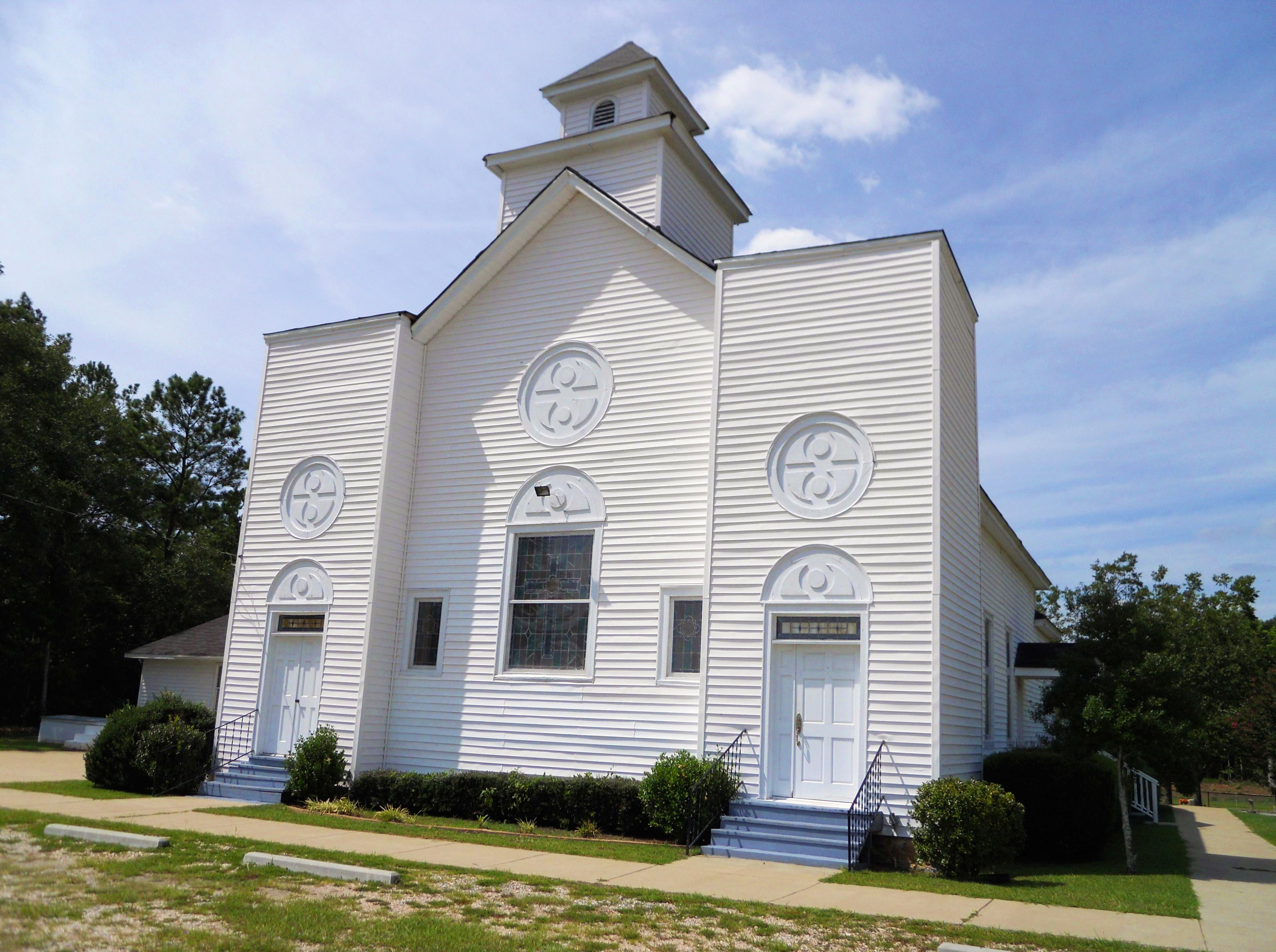
- Midway Baptist Church

- Location within Georgia Location within the United States
- Location: 2495 Hopewell Church Rd.
- Nearest city: Hamilton, Georgia
- Coordinates: 32°49′9″N 84°59′5″W
- Area: 8 acres (3.2 ha)
- Built: 1920-21, 1925
- Architectural style: Bungalow/craftsman (school)
- NRHP reference No.: 99001101
- Added to NRHP: September 9, 1999

Sunnyside School–Midway Baptist Church and Midway Cemetery Historic District is a historic district with a school and Baptist church building in Hamilton, Georgia. The school was built during 1920–1921, and the church was constructed in 1925. The school has aspects of Bungalow/craftsman style.

The district was added to the National Register of Historic Places in 1999.
