= List of Georgia (U.S. state) locations by per capita income =

Georgia is the thirty-third-richest (33rd) state in the United States of America, with a median household income of US$46,007 (2011).

== Georgia counties ranked by per capita income ==
Note: Data is from the 2015 United States Census Data and the 2006-2010 American Community Survey 5-Year Estimates.

Rank	County	Per capita income	Median household income	Median family income	Population	Number of households
1	Forsyth	$37,211	$96,709	$105,579	244,252	76,753
2	Fulton	$35,385	$87,605	$96,501	175,511	59,433
3	Fayette	$35,076	$82,216	$92,976	106,567	38,167
4	Oconee	$34,271	$74,352	$85,371	32,808	11,622
5	Cobb	$33,110	$65,522	$78,920	688,078	260,056
6	Harris	$31,073	$67,018	$74,457	32,024	11,823
7	Cherokee	$30,217	$66,320	$77,190	214,346	75,936
8	Columbia	$29,479	$66,333	$74,426	124,053	44,898
9	DeKalb	$28,412	$51,349	$60,718	691,893	271,809
10	Bryan	$28,365	$63,244	$72,118	30,233	10,738
11	Glynn	$28,040	$50,337	$62,445	79,626	31,774
12	Morgan	$27,732	$45,817	$57,724	17,868	6,660
	United States	$27,334	$51,914	$62,982	332,911,374	116,716,292
13	Gwinnett	$26,901	$63,219	$70,767	805,321	268,519
14	Coweta	$26,161	$61,550	$68,469	127,317	45,673
15	Pickens	$25,892	$49,945	$59,955	29,431	11,291
16	Henry	$25,773	$63,923	$70,972	203,922	70,255
17	Putnam	$25,576	$41,529	$49,814	21,218	8,601
18	Dawson	$25,557	$51,128	$60,236	22,330	8,433
19	Chatham	$25,397	$44,928	$54,933	265,128	103,038
20	Houston	$25,206	$55,098	$67,227	139,900	53,051
	Georgia	$25,134	$49,347	$58,790	9,687,653	3,585,584
21	Greene	$24,943	$38,513	$42,307	15,994	6,519
22	Douglas	$24,515	$55,852	$62,977	132,403	46,624
23	Rockdale	$24,367	$55,779	$63,167	85,215	30,027
24	Union	$24,182	$41,298	$50,772	21,356	9,116
25	Lee	$23,867	$59,811	$67,943	28,298	9,706
26	White	$23,680	$41,756	$50,981	27,144	10,646
27	Hall	$23,675	$50,876	$57,774	179,684	60,691
28	Monroe	$23,656	$48,297	$61,110	26,424	9,662
29	Effingham	$23,465	$56,903	$63,277	52,250	18,092
30	Paulding	$23,450	$62,348	$67,117	142,324	48,105
31	Catoosa	$22,563	$46,544	$54,796	63,942	24,475
32	Walton	$22,521	$51,721	$58,750	83,768	29,583
33	Muscogee	$22,514	$41,331	$50,771	189,885	74,081
34	Jackson	$22,473	$51,506	$58,239	60,485	21,343
35	Rabun	$22,471	$34,406	$50,410	16,276	6,780
36	Bartow	$22,241	$49,216	$56,281	100,157	35,782
37	Chattahoochee	$22,202	$51,089	$55,745	11,267	2,686
38	Camden	$22,022	$49,230	$57,366	50,513	18,047
39	Jones	$21,598	$50,717	$56,038	28,669	10,586
40	Newton	$21,583	$52,361	$56,519	99,958	34,390
41	Towns	$21,527	$39,540	$48,020	10,471	4,510
42	Bibb	$21,436	$38,798	$52,158	155,547	60,295
43	Thomas	$21,261	$35,797	$46,333	44,720	17,573
44	Fannin	$21,103	$34,145	$41,422	23,682	10,187
45	Pike	$21,051	$53,213	$57,458	17,869	6,187
46	McIntosh	$20,964	$39,075	$51,765	14,333	5,971
47	Butts	$20,963	$52,257	$59,511	23,655	7,881
48	Barrow	$20,882	$48,958	$55,415	69,367	23,971
49	Crawford	$20,692	$37,062	$48,623	12,630	4,822
50	Floyd	$20,640	$41,066	$49,310	96,317	35,930
51	Richmond	$20,604	$37,882	$45,220	200,549	76,924
52	Carroll	$20,523	$45,559	$53,703	110,527	39,187
53	Gilmer	$20,439	$36,741	$45,317	28,292	11,314
54	Brooks	$20,346	$41,309	$47,599	16,243	6,457
55	Jasper	$20,263	$42,081	$52,177	13,900	5,044
56	Dade	$20,168	$39,760	$48,881	16,633	6,291
57	Lumpkin	$20,088	$43,394	$50,318	29,966	10,989
58	Lowndes	$20,041	$39,096	$48,296	109,233	39,747
59	Miller	$19,895	$33,196	$40,685	6,125	2,426
60	Clarke	$19,839	$34,253	$51,687	116,714	45,414
61	Whitfield	$19,780	$42,345	$48,991	102,599	35,180
62	Troup	$19,699	$41,770	$50,625	67,044	24,828
63	Lincoln	$19,627	$36,399	$43,872	7,996	3,281
64	Spalding	$19,607	$41,100	$49,640	64,073	23,565
65	Banks	$19,497	$40,455	$48,606	18,395	6,700
66	Walker	$19,440	$38,723	$46,307	68,756	26,497
67	Laurens	$19,387	$38,280	$46,466	48,434	18,641
68	Habersham	$19,286	$40,192	$49,182	43,041	15,472
69	Franklin	$19,276	$36,739	$44,667	22,084	8,540
70	Seminole	$19,263	$32,666	$38,339	8,729	3,509
71	Dougherty	$19,210	$32,435	$39,951	94,565	36,508
72	Hart	$19,124	$36,109	$44,451	25,213	10,121
73	Evans	$19,072	$40,796	$45,938	11,000	4,033
74	Haralson	$19,033	$38,996	$45,339	28,780	10,757
75	Appling	$18,977	$36,155	$46,005	18,236	6,969
76	Madison	$18,975	$41,343	$49,713	28,120	10,508
77	Bleckley	$18,960	$35,661	$48,750	13,063	4,660
78	Clayton	$18,958	$43,311	$48,064	259,424	90,633
79	Brantley	$18,905	$37,343	$43,028	18,411	6,885
80	Peach	$18,681	$41,014	$53,708	27,695	9,958
81	Liberty	$18,662	$42,674	$46,818	63,453	22,155
82	Tift	$18,394	$36,847	$45,376	40,118	14,836
83	Wayne	$18,393	$37,340	$45,649	30,099	10,562
84	Worth	$18,348	$38,670	$46,791	21,679	8,214
85	Meriwether	$18,295	$37,845	$47,126	21,992	8,522
86	Ware	$18,295	$35,517	$47,609	36,312	13,654
87	Gordon	$18,285	$40,916	$47,964	55,186	19,715
88	Stephens	$18,285	$34,938	$41,768	26,175	10,289
89	Pierce	$18,283	$37,062	$47,157	18,758	7,083
90	Polk	$18,214	$38,646	$43,172	41,475	15,092
91	Heard	$18,077	$42,685	$47,591	11,834	4,400
92	Talbot	$18,007	$33,873	$43,694	6,865	2,832
93	Toombs	$17,974	$31,635	$44,266	27,223	10,375
94	Wilkinson	$17,929	$37,902	$49,138	9,563	3,666
95	Decatur	$17,833	$33,297	$44,322	27,842	10,390
96	Bulloch	$17,812	$34,327	$51,904	70,217	25,575
97	Grady	$17,785	$32,247	$39,159	25,011	9,418
98	Marion	$17,729	$31,581	$51,000	8,742	3,420
99	Lamar	$17,725	$37,536	$42,218	18,317	6,618
100	Randolph	$17,632	$26,194	$29,800	7,719	3,187
101	Jenkins	$17,629	$27,686	$35,876	8,340	3,192
102	Oglethorpe	$17,572	$39,319	$52,955	14,899	5,647
103	Baldwin	$17,488	$37,237	$47,714	45,720	16,788
104	Sumter	$17,436	$32,430	$41,371	32,819	12,123
105	Upson	$17,398	$34,509	$42,737	27,153	10,716
106	Colquitt	$17,362	$32,902	$39,086	45,498	16,317
107	McDuffie	$17,261	$35,414	$42,472	21,875	8,289
108	Crisp	$17,187	$29,960	$41,616	23,439	9,079
109	Montgomery	$17,168	$35,182	$45,989	9,123	3,287
110	Bacon	$17,110	$31,429	$45,442	11,096	4,214
111	Elbert	$17,100	$30,543	$35,550	20,166	8,063
112	Wilkes	$16,993	$28,022	$39,109	10,593	4,263
113	Murray	$16,925	$38,226	$45,420	39,628	14,080
114	Lanier	$16,894	$37,522	$43,162	10,078	3,608
115	Glascock	$16,844	$37,149	$46,283	3,082	1,162
116	Tattnall	$16,742	$38,522	$45,601	25,520	8,210
117	Treutlen	$16,710	$36,467	$48,110	6,885	2,543
118	Clinch	$16,709	$31,963	$45,350	6,798	2,572
119	Coffee	$16,664	$35,202	$39,880	42,356	14,817
120	Charlton	$16,652	$40,850	$45,913	12,171	3,927
121	Pulaski	$16,621	$36,262	$46,850	12,010	4,475
122	Irwin	$16,561	$38,376	$51,262	9,538	3,495
123	Cook	$16,528	$31,390	$37,352	17,212	6,339
124	Baker	$16,379	$27,462	$42,585	3,451	1,372
125	Early	$16,330	$26,928	$40,238	11,008	4,228
126	Mitchell	$16,322	$36,198	$43,930	23,498	8,055
127	Webster	$16,295	$25,708	$40,441	2,799	1,119
128	Dodge	$16,288	$33,580	$46,460	21,796	8,177
129	Screven	$16,189	$32,155	$44,244	14,593	5,596
130	Schley	$16,122	$35,096	$47,234	5,010	1,872
131	Emanuel	$16,076	$30,205	$36,402	22,598	8,430
132	Candler	$16,068	$35,828	$39,105	10,998	4,041
133	Berrien	$16,049	$32,202	$40,869	19,286	7,443
134	Warren	$15,987	$31,043	$36,925	5,834	2,315
135	Turner	$15,973	$30,763	$40,446	8,930	3,339
136	Burke	$15,934	$33,155	$41,659	23,316	8,533
137	Twiggs	$15,904	$26,521	$31,324	9,023	3,634
138	Jeff Davis	$15,730	$32,928	$40,313	15,068	5,689
139	Johnson	$15,659	$27,607	$35,750	9,980	3,347
140	Stewart	$15,612	$30,954	$41,673	6,058	1,862
141	Terrell	$15,553	$27,909	$35,663	9,315	3,519
142	Ben Hill	$15,529	$30,134	$35,868	17,634	6,794
143	Atkinson	$15,456	$33,834	$34,859	8,375	2,983
144	Jefferson	$15,165	$29,268	$36,980	16,930	6,241
145	Chattooga	$15,158	$32,419	$39,037	26,015	9,548
146	Long	$15,068	$41,186	$46,654	14,464	5,023
147	Washington	$15,033	$31,382	$41,055	21,187	7,547
148	Dooly	$14,871	$31,038	$39,622	14,918	5,286
149	Taylor	$14,693	$25,237	$35,819	8,906	3,522
150	Echols	$14,201	$32,390	$33,664	4,034	1,329
151	Taliaferro	$13,955	$22,188	$29,375	1,717	759
152	Quitman	$13,642	$28,912	$34,342	2,513	1,053
153	Telfair	$13,420	$23,876	$36,109	16,500	5,543
154	Clay	$13,353	$26,250	$31,354	3,183	1,331
155	Macon	$12,902	$27,950	$37,218	14,740	4,999
156	Wilcox	$12,692	$30,784	$40,552	9,255	2,891
157	Calhoun	$12,452	$30,522	$37,309	6,694	2,002
158	Hancock	$10,925	$22,283	$27,168	9,429	3,341
159	Wheeler	$10,043	$35,422	$45,042	7,421	2,152
