= Whitesville, Georgia =

Unincorporated community in Georgia, U.S.

Coordinates: 32°49′03″N 85°01′53″W

Whitesville is an unincorporated community in Harris County, Georgia, United States.

== History ==
A post office called Whitesville was established in 1837, and remained in operation until 1905. The community was named after the White family of first settlers.

The Georgia General Assembly incorporated Whitesville as a town in 1837. The town's municipal charter was repealed in 1995.

The Whitesville United Methodist Church and Cemetery was listed on the National Register of Historic Places in 2002.

== Geography ==
Whitesville is located in the northwestern part of Harris County in west central Georgia, and is served by I-185 and GA-219.
