= Shiloh, Georgia =

- City
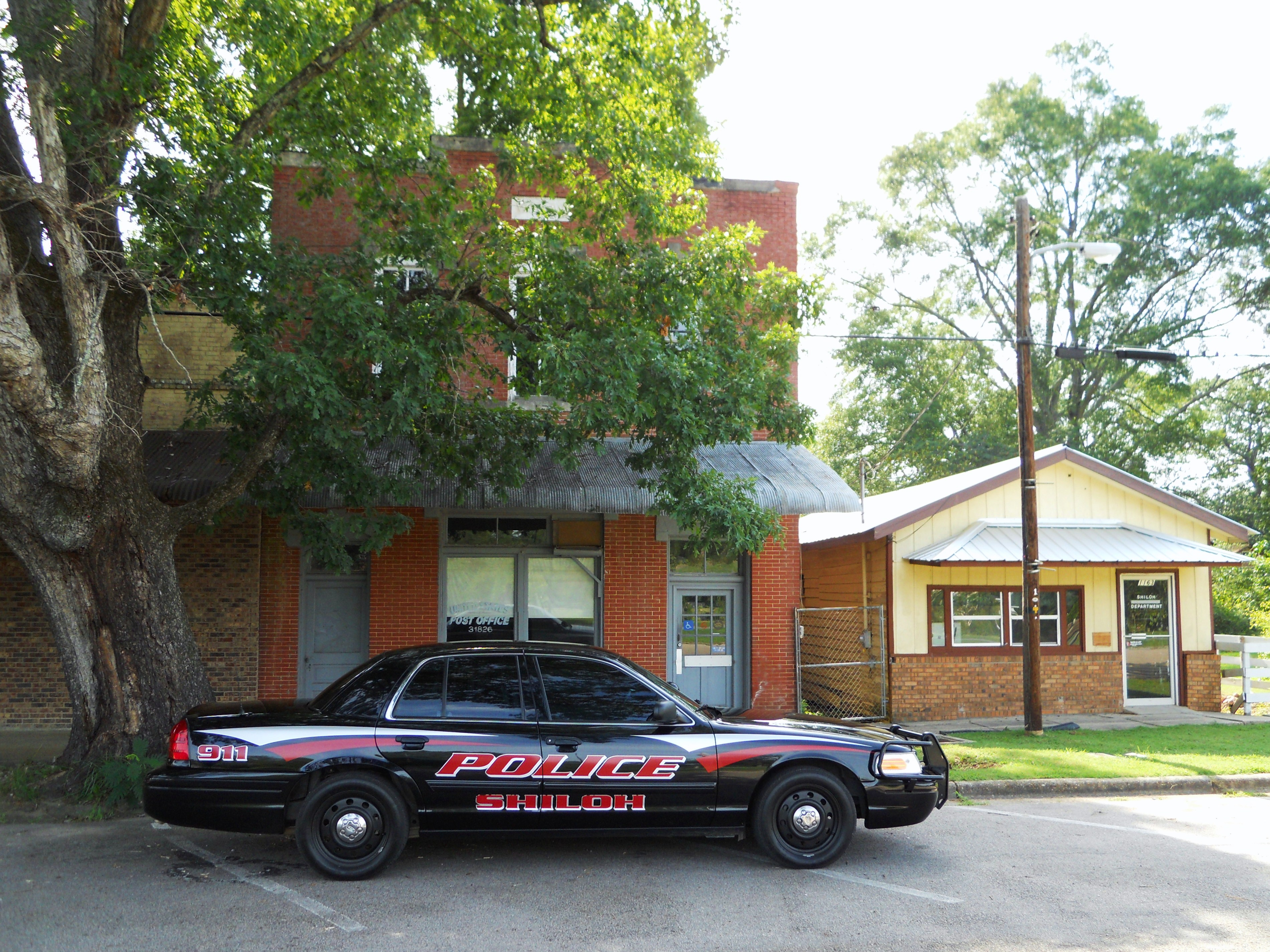
- Shiloh, Georgia

- Location in Harris County and the state of Georgia
- Coordinates: 32°48′36″N 84°41′45″W
- Country: United States
- State: Georgia
- Counties: Harris

Area
  - Total: 2.22 sq mi (5.74 km^{2})
  - Land: 2.19 sq mi (5.67 km^{2})
  - Water: 0.027 sq mi (0.07 km^{2})
- Elevation: 892 ft (272 m)

Population (2020)
  - Total: 402
  - Density: 184/sq mi (70.9/km^{2})
- ZIP Code: 31826
- Area code: 706
- FIPS code: 13-70428
- GNIS feature ID: 333034
- Website: https://www.cityofshiloh.org/

Shiloh is a city on the northeastern edge of Harris County, Georgia, United States. It is part of the Columbus, Georgia–Alabama metropolitan statistical area. As of the 2020 census, the population was 402.

== History ==
A post office called Shiloh was established in 1874. The community was named after the local Shiloh Baptist Church, which in turn took its name from Shiloh, a place mentioned in the Hebrew Bible.

The Georgia General Assembly incorporated Shiloh in 1961.

== Geography ==
Shiloh is located in the northeast corner of Harris County along Alternate U.S. Route 27, which leads southwest 33 miles (53 km) to Columbus and north 6 miles (10 km) to Warm Springs. Georgia State Route 85 runs east of the city, leading northeast 6 miles (10 km) to Manchester. Georgia State Route 116 intersects Alternate U.S. Route 27 in the city, leading east 10 miles (16 km) to Woodland and west 13 miles (21 km) to Hamilton. Atlanta is 78 miles (126 km) by road to the northeast. The city is located in the Piedmont region of the state.

According to the United States Census Bureau, Shiloh has a total area of 2.3 square miles (5.9 km^{2}), of which 0.03 square miles (0.07 km^{2}), or 1.19%, are water.

== Demographics ==
Historical population
Census	Pop.	Note	%±
1970	298		—
1980	392		31.5%
1990	329		−16.1%
2000	423		28.6%
2010	445		5.2%
2020	402		−9.7%
U.S. Decennial Census

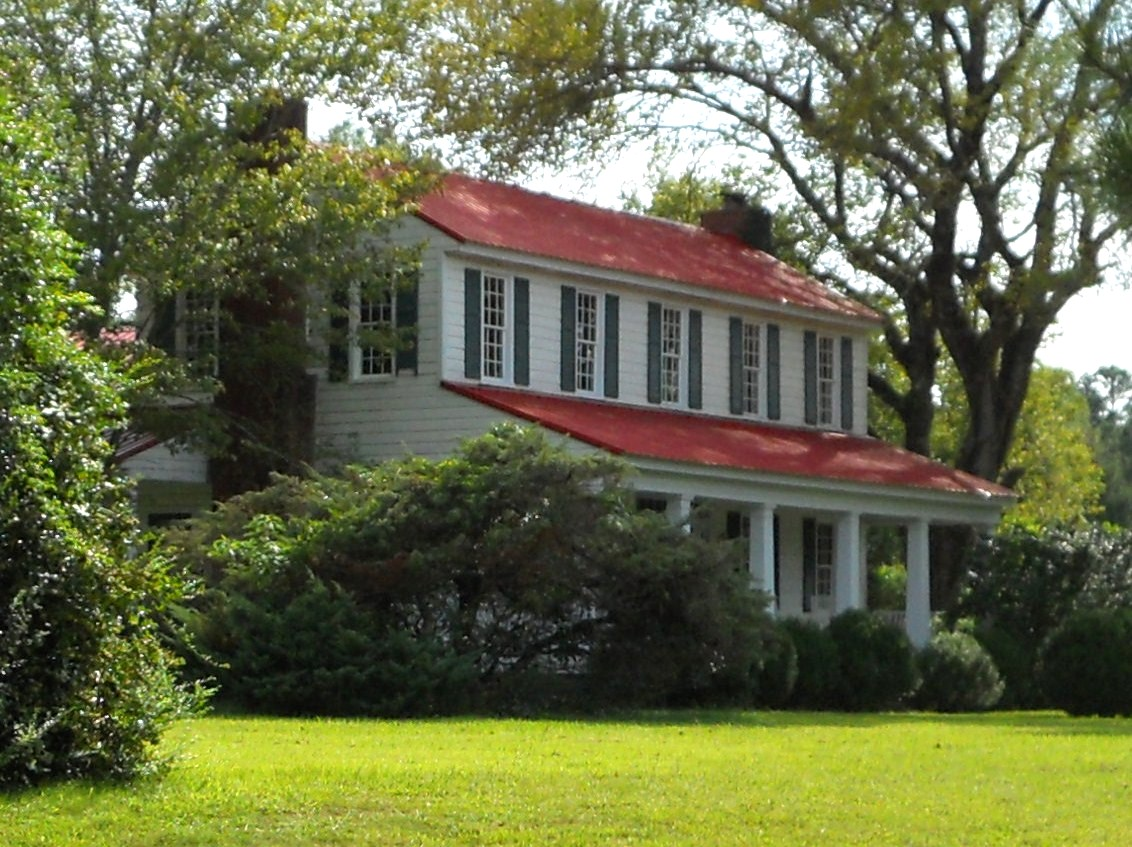
The William and Ann Copeland Jr. House is located near Shiloh. It was added to the National Register of Historic Places in 2008.

As of the census of 2000, there were 423 people, 158 households, and 127 families residing in the city. By the 2020 census, its population was 402.

== See also ==
- List of cities in Georgia (U.S. state)
- National Register of Historic Places listings in Harris County, Georgia
