= Harris County High School =

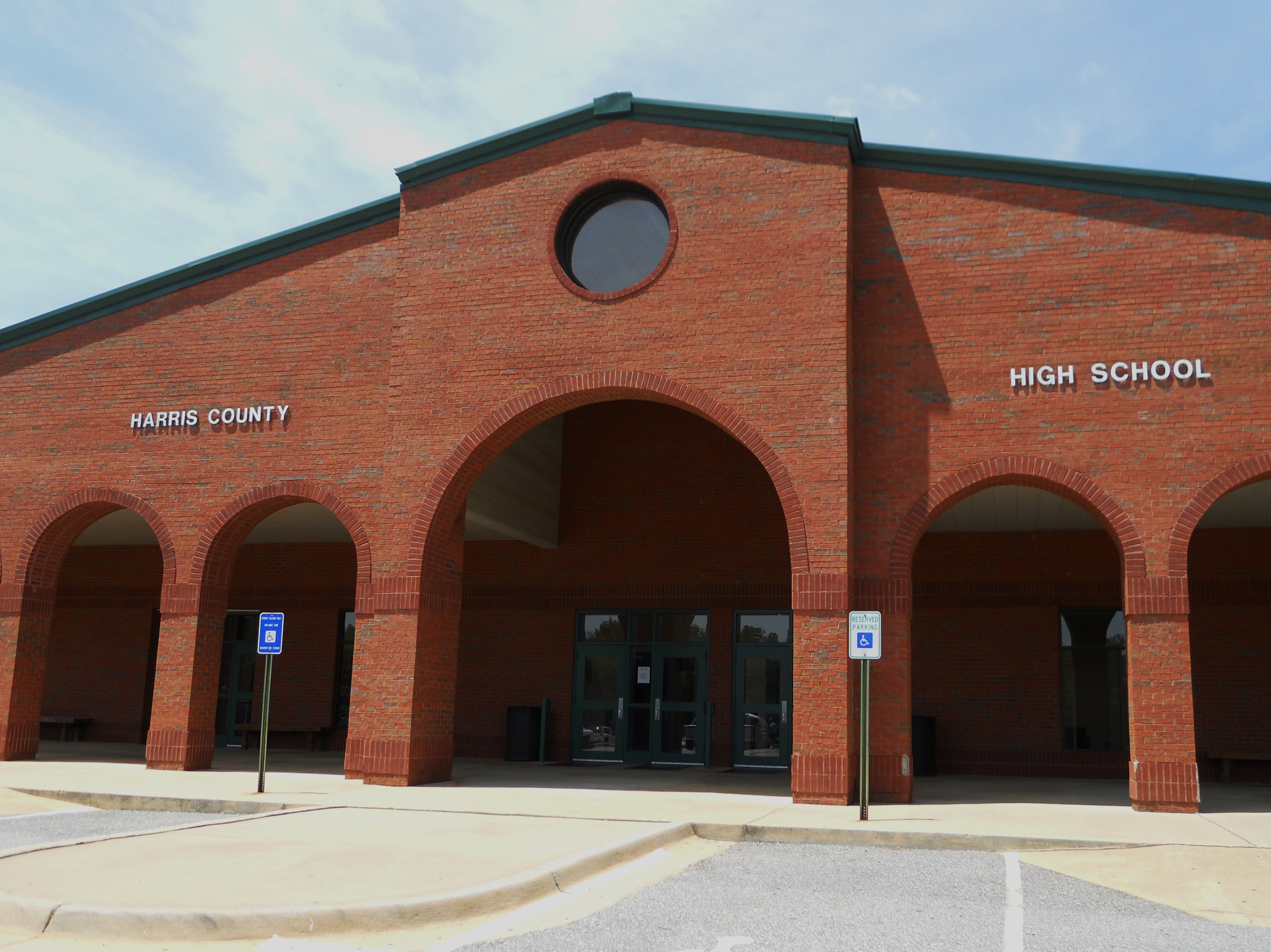

Location
- 8281 GA Highway 116; Hamilton, Georgia 31811; United States; 32°45′29″N 84°53′20″W

Information
- Type: Public
- Established: 1956
- School district: Harris County School District
- Principal: Lindie Snyder
- Teaching staff: 82.37 FTE
- Grades: 9–12
- Enrollment: 1,929 (2024–2025)
- Student to teacher ratio: 23.42
- Colors: Black and Gold
- Mascot: Tigers
- Telephone: (706) 689-6893
- Website: Harris County High School

Harris County High School is a public high school serving grades 9 through 12. The school is located in Hamilton, Georgia, United States, in Harris County. The school mascot is a tiger, called Tano, and the school colors are black and gold. The school was established in 1956.

== History ==
Harris County High School was founded in 1955, and was originally located on the current site of Harris County Carver Middle School until 1998. The new location of the school was built just west of town, where it stands today, and was completed in 1998.

The school was hit by an EF2 tornado in 2011, damaging the football field, gym, portions of the school roof, and numerous cars in the parking lot, as well as destroying the locker room adjacent to the football field. No injuries or fatalities occurred.

== Clubs and activities ==
The school offers numerous clubs and activities, such as:

- Academic Bowl
- Band: The Sound of the County
- Beta Club
- FBLA (Future Business Leaders of America)
- FCA (Fellowship of Christian Athletes)
- FFA (Future Farmers of America)
- HOSA
- Key Club
- Math Team
- NAHS (National Art Honor Society)
- NEHS (National English Honor Society)
- NHS (National Honor Society)
- S3 (Students Standing Strong)
- Science Olympiad
- SNHS (Science National Honor Society)
- Thespian Society
- TSA (Technology Student Association)
- CyberTeam

== Notable alumni ==
- Jordan Jenkins (2012), NFL player
- Tae Crowder (2015), NFL player
- TaQuon Marshall (2015), professional football player
- Jessika Carter (2018), WNBA player
- Cole Mathis (2021), baseball player in the Chicago Cubs organization
- Josh Pate (sports commentator) (2004), College Football Personality
