= Fortson, Georgia =

- Suburban community
- Location within Georgia Location within the United States
- Coordinates: 32°36′25.2″N 84°56′13.2″W
- Country: United States
- State: Georgia
- County: Harris, Muscogee
- Elevation: 515 ft (157 m)

Population (2022)
  - Total: 8,573
- Time zone: UTC-5 (Eastern (EST))
  - Summer (DST): UTC-4 (EDT)
- ZIP code: 31808
- Area code: 706
- GNIS feature ID: 355883

Fortson is a suburban community located in southern Harris County, Georgia, United States, with a small portion of the community extending into northern Muscogee County. The smaller portion of the community in Muscogee County is in the city of Columbus.

== Location ==
The community is located along the Harris-Muscogee County line north of the Bradley Park Drive area, and is generally bounded by Biggers Rd and Williams Rd to the south, the Alabama state line to the west, Mountain Hill Rd to the north in Harris County, and U.S. Route 27 to the east. Many upscale homes and neighborhoods are in this area, mainly off of Fortson, Wooldridge, and Whitesville Rds.

== Education ==
The community is home to one of the seven schools served by the Harris County School District, New Mountain Hill Elementary School.

== In popular culture ==
The community was used as a filming location for the MSNBC reality television series To Catch a Predator.
