= Quayvon Hicks =

American football player (born 1994)

Profile
- Position: Running back

Personal information
- Born: July 17, 1994 (age 32); Blackshear, Georgia, U.S.
- Listed height: 6 ft 1 in (1.85 m)
- Listed weight: 256 lb (116 kg)

Career information
- High school: Blackshear (GA) Pierce County
- College: Georgia
- NFL draft: 2016: undrafted

Career history
- Tampa Bay Buccaneers (2017)*; Columbus Lions (2018); Massachusetts Pirates (2019); Washington Valor (2019); Spokane Shock (2020–2021); Jacksonville Sharks (2022); Orlando Predators (2022–2023)
- * Offseason or practice squad member only
- Stats at Pro Football Reference

Quayvon Hicks (born July 17, 1994) is an American professional football running back. He played college football for the Georgia Bulldogs.

== Professional career ==
Hicks was signed by the Tampa Bay Buccaneers on January 10, 2017. He was waived on August 20, 2017. On October 10, 2017, Hicks signed with the Columbus Lions.

=== Massachusetts Pirates ===
Hicks signed with the Massachusetts Pirates of the National Arena League for the 2019 season. Hicks had 39 carries for 155 yards and 1 reception for 7 yards, while producing 6 touchdowns.
