= Cataula, Georgia =

- Unincorporated community Census-designated place
- Location within Georgia Location within the United States
- Coordinates: 32°39′19″N 84°52′6″W
- Country: United States
- State: Georgia
- County: Harris
- Elevation: 692 ft (211 m)

Population (2020)
  - Total: 1,433
- Time zone: UTC-5 (Eastern (EST))
  - Summer (DST): UTC-4 (EDT)
- ZIP code: 31804
- Area code: 706
- GNIS feature ID: 331344

Cataula /kəˈtɔːlə/ is an unincorporated community and census-designated place (CDP) in Harris County, Georgia, United States.

The 2020 census listed a population of 1,433.

== History ==
"Cataula" is derived from the Muscogee word kitali, meaning "withered mulberry". Cataula is located on Cataula Creek, which flows into nearby Mulberry Creek.

== Geography ==
Cataula is located at 32°45'52.81" North, 84°54'4.68" West (32.640602, -84.9013). It is located along U.S. Route 27, which runs north to south through the city, leading southwest 16 miles (26 km) to Columbus and north 33 miles (53 km) to LaGrange. Georgia State Route 315 meets U.S. Route 27 in the city limits for a very short concurrency. Atlanta is 93 miles (150 km) by road to the northeast. Cataula sits at an elevation of 692 feet (211 m) above sea level in the Piedmont region of the state.

== Demographics ==
Historical population
Census	Pop.	Note	%±
2020	1,433		—
U.S. Decennial Census; 1850-1870 1870-1880; 1890-1910 1920-1930; 1940 1950 1960; 1970 1980 1990; 2000 2010-2020

Cataula was first listed as a census designated place in the 2020 census.

=== 2020 census ===
As of the 2020 census, Cataula had a population of 1,433. The median age was 40.1 years. 25.1% of residents were under the age of 18 and 15.2% of residents were 65 years of age or older. For every 100 females there were 92.9 males, and for every 100 females age 18 and over there were 87.1 males age 18 and over.

0.0% of residents lived in urban areas, while 100.0% lived in rural areas.

There were 519 households in Cataula, of which 34.7% had children under the age of 18 living in them. Of all households, 61.8% were married-couple households, 17.5% were households with a male householder and no spouse or partner present, and 14.1% were households with a female householder and no spouse or partner present. About 12.0% of all households were made up of individuals and 6.8% had someone living alone who was 65 years of age or older.

There were 568 housing units, of which 8.6% were vacant. The homeowner vacancy rate was 1.5% and the rental vacancy rate was 0.0%.

Cataula CDP, Georgia – Racial and ethnic composition Note: the US Census treats Hispanic/Latino as an ethnic category. This table excludes Latinos from the racial categories and assigns them to a separate category. Hispanics/Latinos may be of any race.
Race / Ethnicity (NH = Non-Hispanic)	Pop 2020	% 2020
White alone (NH)	990	69.09%
Black or African American alone (NH)	257	17.93%
Native American or Alaska Native alone (NH)	3	0.21%
Asian alone (NH)	20	1.40%
Pacific Islander alone (NH)	1	0.07%
Some Other Race alone (NH)	5	0.35%
Mixed Race or Multi-Racial (NH)	66	4.61%
Hispanic or Latino (any race)	91	6.35%
Total	1,433	100.00%

== Education ==
The community is home to two of the seven schools in the county:

- Mulberry Creek Elementary School
- Creekside Intermediate School (grades 5–6)
