= Harris County, Georgia =

County in Georgia, United States

- County
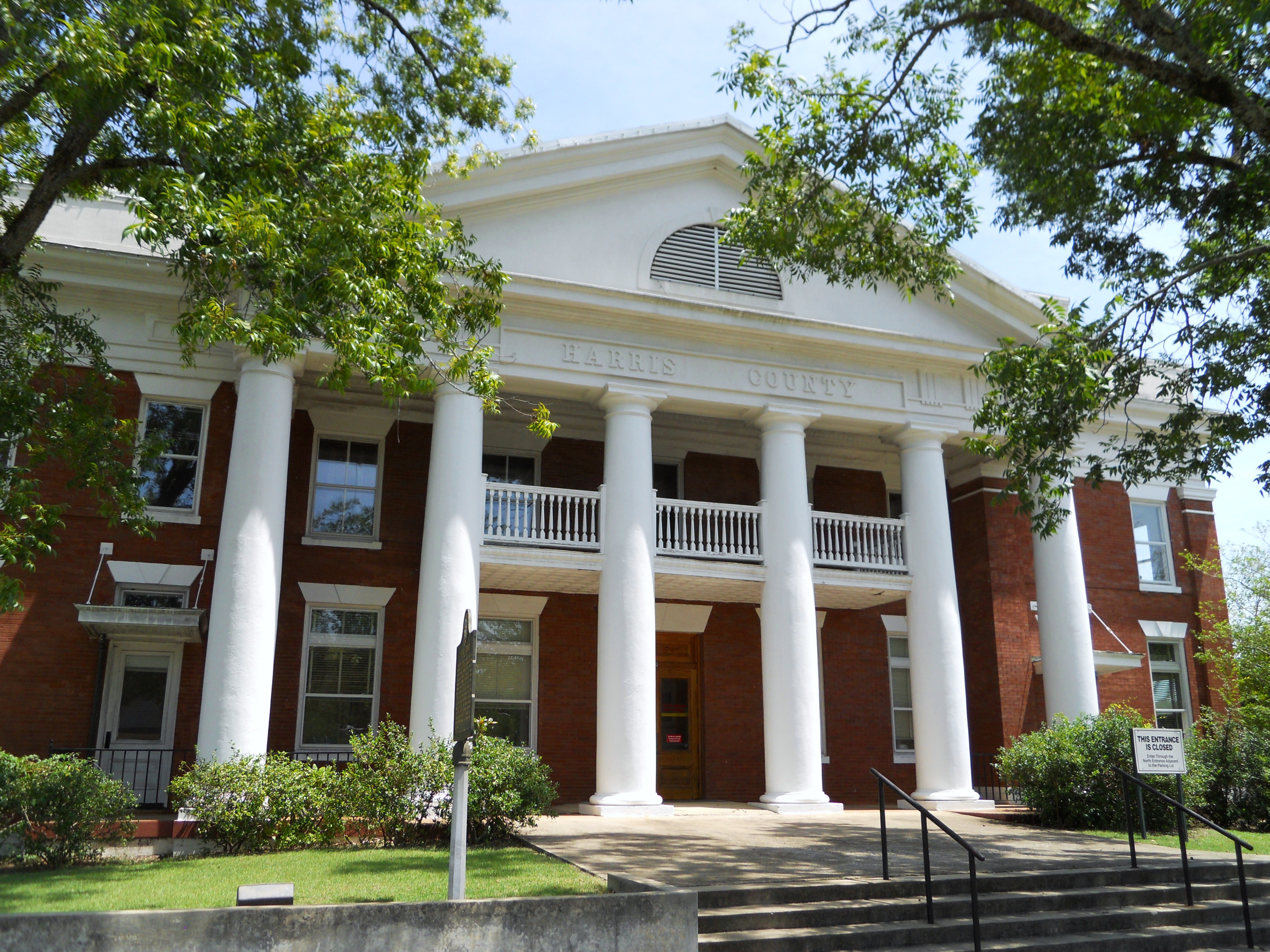
- County courthouse in Hamilton

- Location within the U.S. state of Georgia
- Coordinates: 32°44′N 84°55′W
- Country: United States
- State: Georgia
- Founded: December 14, 1827; 198 years ago
- Named for: Charles Harris
- Seat: Hamilton
- Largest city: Pine Mountain

Area
  - Total: 473 sq mi (1,230 km^{2})
  - Land: 464 sq mi (1,200 km^{2})
  - Water: 9.1 sq mi (24 km^{2}) 1.9%

Population (2020)
  - Total: 34,668
  - Estimate (2025): 37,280 ▲
  - Density: 74.7/sq mi (28.8/km^{2})
- Time zone: UTC−5 (Eastern)
  - Summer (DST): UTC−4 (EDT)
- Congressional district: 3rd
- Website: www.harriscountyga.gov

Harris County is a county located in the west-central portion of the U.S. state of Georgia; its western border with the state of Alabama is formed by the Chattahoochee River. As of the 2020 census, the population was 34,668. The county seat is Hamilton. The largest city in the county is Pine Mountain, a resort town that is home to the Franklin D. Roosevelt State Park (the largest state park in Georgia). Harris County was created on December 14, 1827, and named for Charles Harris, a Georgia judge and attorney. Harris County is part of the Columbus, GA-AL metropolitan area and has become a popular suburban and exurban destination of residence for families relocating from Columbus. Because of this, Harris has become the sixth-wealthiest county in Georgia in terms of per capita income and the third-wealthiest in the state outside of Metro Atlanta.

== History ==
The county was settled by European Americans largely after the federal government had removed the indigenous Creek people (Muscogee) in the 1830s, under treaties by which they ceded most of their homelands to the United States. They were relocated to Indian Territory west of the Mississippi River.

In the antebellum era, parts of the county were developed for cotton plantations, the premier commodity crop. Planters acquired numerous enslaved African Americans as laborers from the Upper South through the domestic slave trade.

The County Courthouse was designed by Edward Columbus Hosford of Georgia and completed in 1906.

Moonshiners were active in the mountain areas of the county in the late 19th and early 20th centuries. Both whites and blacks took part in this, and were common drinking patrons.

=== Lynchings ===
On January 22, 1912, a black woman and three black men were lynched in Hamilton, the county seat, for the alleged murder of young local white landowner Norman Hadley. He was described by journalist Karen Branan in her 2016 book about these events as a white, "near penniless plowboy-playboy" and "notorious predator of black women."

Of this group, Dusky Crutchfield was the first woman lynched in Georgia. The lynching case attracted attention of national northern newspapers. Also murdered by the lynch mob were Eugene Harrington, Burrell Hardaway, and Johnie Moore. (Note: There was confusion about the names of victims at the time, and variations in spelling have been published.)

The four had been taken in for questioning about Hadley's murder by Sheriff Marion Madison "Buddie" Hadley, but never arrested. Lynched as scapegoats by a white mob of 100 men, they were later shown to have been utterly innocent. As an example of the complex relationships in the town and county, Johnie Moore was a mixed-race cousin of the sheriff; and Norman Hadley was the sheriff's nephew.

In 1947, prosperous farmer Henry "Peg" Gilbert, a married African-American man who owned and farmed 100 acres in Troup County, was arrested by officials from neighboring Harris County and charged with harboring a fugitive. The 47-year-old father was accused in the case of Gus Davidson, an African-American man accused of fatally shooting a white man in Harris County and who had disappeared. Four days later Gilbert was dead, shot while held in jail by the Harris County Sheriff, who said it was self-defense. No charges were filed against him.

In 2016 the Civil Rights and Restorative Justice Project of Northeastern University reported on Gilbert's death in custody. They had found that Henry Gilbert had been beaten severely before his death, and shot five times. They asserted he had been detained and killed because whites resented his success as a farmer. Economic issues and competition were often at the bottom of lynchings. A white man took over Gilbert's land, cheating his family out of everything he had built.

== Geography ==
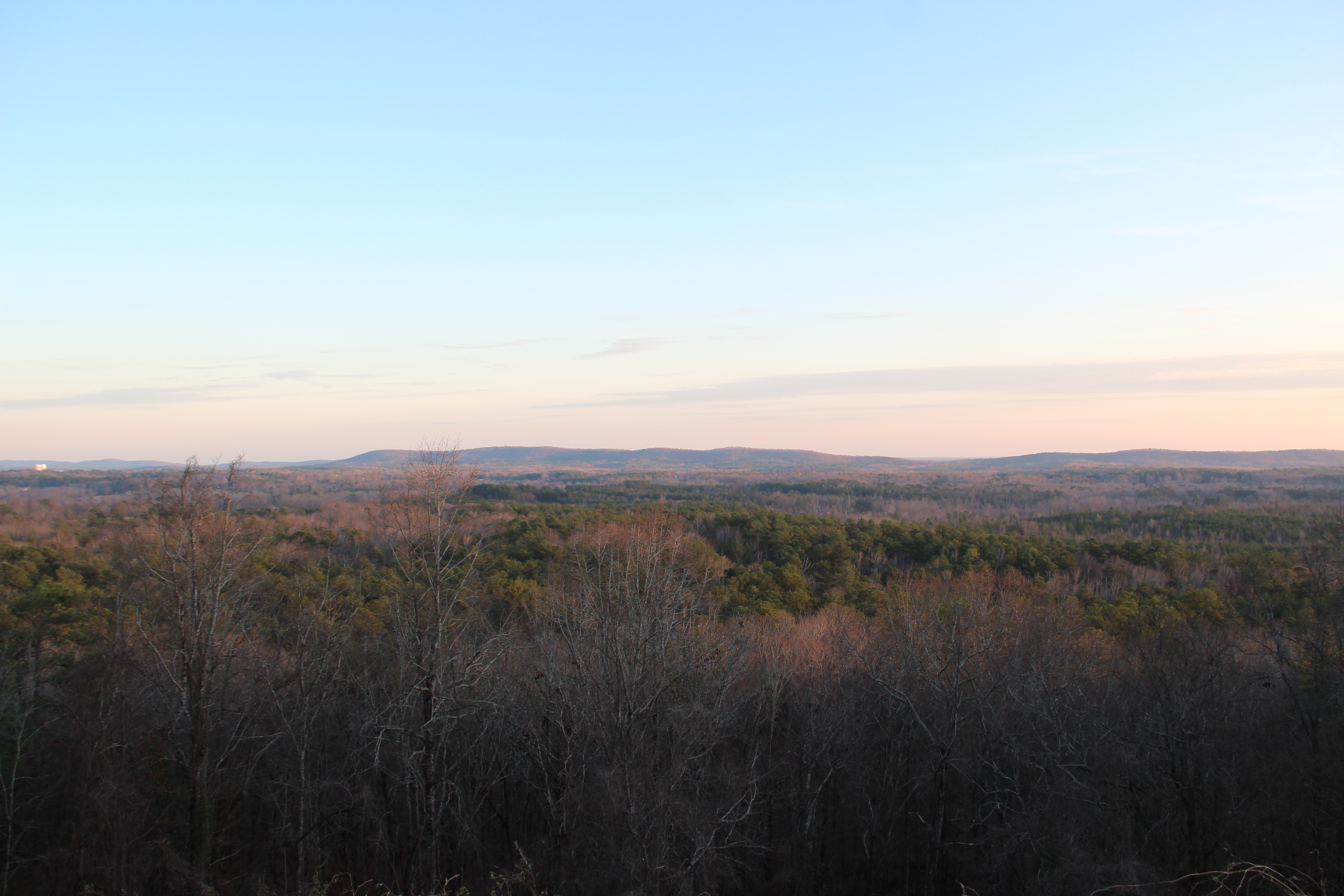
View of Harris County on Pine Mountain

According to the U.S. Census Bureau, the county has a total area of 473 square miles (1,230 km^{2}), of which 464 square miles (1,200 km^{2}) are land and 9.1 square miles (24 km^{2}) (1.9%) are covered by water.

The county is located in the Piedmont region of the state, with forests, farmland, and rolling hills covering much of the county. The Pine Mountain Range begins in the county, and runs across the northernmost parts of the county, with the highest point on the range found at Dowdell's Knob near the Meriwether County line.

The majority of Harris County is located in the middle Chattahoochee River–Lake Harding subbasin of the ACF River Basin (Apalachicola–Chattahoochee–Flint River Basin), with the exception of the county's southeastern border area, south of Ellerslie, which is located in the middle Chattahoochee River–Walter F. George Lake subbasin of the same ACF River Basin as that part of the county is drained by Bull Creek, which flows into Upatoi Creek south of Columbus.

Lake Harding and Goat Rock Lake both form much of the county's western border along the Chattahoochee, and both are very popular recreational destinations, especially for metro Columbus residents.

=== Major highways ===
- Interstate 85 / State Route 403 (unsigned)
- Interstate 185 / State Route 411 (unsigned)
- U.S. Route 27 / State Route 1
  - U.S. Route 27 Alternate
- State Route 18
- State Route 36
- State Route 85
  - State Route 85 Alternate
- State Route 103
- State Route 116
- State Route 190
- State Route 208
- State Route 219
- State Route 315
- State Route 354

=== Adjacent counties ===
- Troup County (north)
- Meriwether County (northeast)
- Talbot County (east)
- Muscogee County (south)
- Lee County, Alabama (southwest/CST border)
- Chambers County, Alabama (northwest/CST border except Lanett and Valley as the cities are jointed by the Columbus metropolitan area)

== Communities ==
=== Cities ===
- Hamilton (county seat)
- Shiloh
- West Point (part, most of city is in Troup County)

=== Towns ===
- Pine Mountain
- Waverly Hall

=== Census-designated places ===
- Antioch
- Cataula
- Ellerslie
- Piney Grove

=== Unincorporated communities ===
- Fortson (part, mostly in Muscogee County)
- Midland (part, mostly in Muscogee County)
- Mountain Hill
- Ossahatchie
- Pine Mountain Valley
- Ridgeway
- Whitesville

== Demographics ==
Historical population
Census	Pop.	Note	%±
1830	5,105		—
1840	13,933		172.9%
1850	14,721		5.7%
1860	13,736		−6.7%
1870	13,284		−3.3%
1880	15,758		18.6%
1890	16,797		6.6%
1900	18,009		7.2%
1910	17,886		−0.7%
1920	15,775		−11.8%
1930	11,140		−29.4%
1940	11,428		2.6%
1950	11,265		−1.4%
1960	11,167		−0.9%
1970	11,520		3.2%
1980	15,464		34.2%
1990	17,788		15.0%
2000	23,695		33.2%
2010	32,024		35.2%
2020	34,668		8.3%
2025 (est.)	37,280	▲	7.5%
U.S. Decennial Census; 1790-1880 1890-1910; 1920-1930 1930-1940; 1940-1950 1960-1980; 1980-2000 2010

=== Racial and ethnic composition ===
Harris County, Georgia – Racial and ethnic composition Note: the US Census treats Hispanic/Latino as an ethnic category. This table excludes Latinos from the racial categories and assigns them to a separate category. Hispanics/Latinos may be of any race.
Race / Ethnicity (NH = Non-Hispanic)	Pop 1980	Pop 1990	Pop 2000	Pop 2010	Pop 2020	% 1980	% 1990	% 2000	% 2010	% 2020
White alone (NH)	10,010	13,041	18,444	24,848	25,925	64.73%	73.31%	77.84%	77.59%	74.78%
Black or African American alone (NH)	5,215	4,559	4,597	5,457	5,170	33.72%	25.63%	19.40%	17.04%	14.91%
Native American or Alaska Native alone (NH)	26	52	82	100	101	0.17%	0.29%	0.35%	0.31%	0.29%
Asian alone (NH)	33	39	118	280	388	0.21%	0.22%	0.50%	0.87%	1.12%
Native Hawaiian or Pacific Islander alone (NH)	x	x	4	17	21	x	x	0.02%	0.05%	0.06%
Other race alone (NH)	8	0	5	45	138	0.05%	0.00%	0.02%	0.14%	0.40%
Mixed race or Multiracial (NH)	x	x	185	405	1,508	x	x	0.78%	1.26%	4.35%
Hispanic or Latino (any race)	172	97	260	872	1,417	1.11%	0.55%	1.10%	2.72%	4.09%
Total	15,464	17,788	23,695	32,024	34,668	100.00%	100.00%	100.00%	100.00%	100.00%

=== 2020 census ===
As of the 2020 census, the county had a population of 34,668 and 9,581 families residing in the county.

The median age was 43.7 years, 22.7% of residents were under the age of 18, and 18.7% of residents were 65 years of age or older. For every 100 females there were 99.6 males, and for every 100 females age 18 and over there were 97.2 males age 18 and over. 2.8% of residents lived in urban areas, while 97.2% lived in rural areas.

The racial makeup of the county was 76.0% White, 15.1% Black or African American, 0.4% American Indian and Alaska Native, 1.1% Asian, 0.1% Native Hawaiian and Pacific Islander, 1.4% from some other race, and 5.9% from two or more races. Hispanic or Latino residents of any race comprised 4.1% of the population.

There were 12,770 households in the county, of which 33.2% had children under the age of 18 living with them and 19.0% had a female householder with no spouse or partner present. About 19.1% of all households were made up of individuals and 9.4% had someone living alone who was 65 years of age or older.

There were 14,212 housing units, of which 10.1% were vacant. Among occupied housing units, 87.2% were owner-occupied and 12.8% were renter-occupied. The homeowner vacancy rate was 1.1% and the rental vacancy rate was 9.2%.

== Politics ==
As of the 2020s, Harris County is a strongly Republican voting county, voting 72% for Donald Trump in 2024. Like all of Georgia except the Unionist Fannin, Towns, Pickens and Gilmer counties, which were in the upland region and could not support plantations, Harris County was historically dominated by a majority of conservative white voters after the Civil War. They belonged to the Democratic Party. From the end of Reconstruction to 1980, they supported Republican presidential candidates only twice, in 1964 (when Barry Goldwater carried the state in a landslide) and 1972 (during Richard Nixon's national landslide).

But the passage of civil rights legislation by the national Democratic Party and social and cultural disruption of the era resulted in white conservatives beginning to support the Republican Party. In 1984, the county swung from having given a 16.4 percent victory to the 'favorite son' of Georgia, Jimmy Carter, in 1976, to a nearly 20-point victory for Ronald Reagan in his second term. In this, it was part of the realignment of white conservatives across the South. Since then, these voters in Harris County have voted for Republican presidential candidates. 1984 is the last time that a Democrat gained more than 40 percent of the vote. This trend has been attributed to the effect of Columbus's suburbs extending into the county, but it is part of the broader realignment among conservatives in the region.

For elections to the United States House of Representatives, Harris County is part of Georgia's 3rd congressional district, currently represented by Brian Jack. For elections to the Georgia State Senate, Harris County is part of District 29. For elections to the Georgia House of Representatives, Harris County is part of district 138 and 139.

United States presidential election results for Harris County, Georgia
Year	Republican		Democratic		Third party(ies)	
Year	No.	%	No.	%	No.	%
1912	28	4.54%	585	94.81%	4	0.65%
1916	31	5.13%	550	91.06%	23	3.81%
1920	9	2.21%	398	97.79%	0	0.00%
1924	20	3.87%	457	88.39%	40	7.74%
1928	144	20.72%	551	79.28%	0	0.00%
1932	21	2.40%	851	97.26%	3	0.34%
1936	54	5.36%	953	94.54%	1	0.10%
1940	71	7.15%	914	92.04%	8	0.81%
1944	79	8.13%	893	91.87%	0	0.00%
1948	138	12.14%	759	66.75%	240	21.11%
1952	544	28.36%	1,374	71.64%	0	0.00%
1956	563	29.79%	1,327	70.21%	0	0.00%
1960	735	35.05%	1,362	64.95%	0	0.00%
1964	2,166	69.74%	940	30.26%	0	0.00%
1968	1,021	25.89%	1,072	27.18%	1,851	46.93%
1972	2,617	78.87%	701	21.13%	0	0.00%
1976	1,544	35.05%	2,861	64.95%	0	0.00%
1980	2,001	40.49%	2,807	56.80%	134	2.71%
1984	3,138	59.95%	2,096	40.05%	0	0.00%
1988	3,414	63.94%	1,905	35.68%	20	0.37%
1992	3,316	47.64%	2,679	38.49%	965	13.86%
1996	3,829	53.70%	2,779	38.97%	523	7.33%
2000	5,554	64.87%	2,912	34.01%	96	1.12%
2004	8,878	71.82%	3,400	27.50%	84	0.68%
2008	10,648	71.25%	4,184	28.00%	113	0.76%
2012	11,197	72.14%	4,145	26.71%	179	1.15%
2016	11,936	72.33%	4,086	24.76%	480	2.91%
2020	14,319	71.59%	5,457	27.28%	226	1.13%
2024	16,283	72.84%	5,976	26.73%	94	0.42%

United States Senate election results for Harris County, Georgia2
Year	Republican		Democratic		Third party(ies)	
Year	No.	%	No.	%	No.	%
2020	14,279	71.85%	5,192	26.13%	402	2.02%
2020	13,297	89.20%	1,610	10.80%	0	0.00%

United States Senate election results for Harris County, Georgia3
Year	Republican		Democratic		Third party(ies)	
Year	No.	%	No.	%	No.	%
2020	7,090	35.90%	3,776	19.12%	8,884	44.98%
2020	13,258	72.48%	5,034	27.52%	0	0.00%
2022	12,072	71.20%	4,546	26.81%	338	1.99%
2022	11,141	71.72%	4,393	28.28%	0	0.00%

Georgia Gubernatorial election results for Harris County
Year	Republican		Democratic		Third party(ies)	
Year	No.	%	No.	%	No.	%
2022	12,924	75.85%	4,008	23.52%	107	0.63%

== Education ==
The Harris County School District holds preschool to grade 12 and consists of four elementary schools, an intermediate school, a middle school, and a high school. The district headquarters is located in Hamilton, and has 274 full-time teachers and over 4,411 students spread out over seven schools.

- Mulberry Creek Elementary School (Cataula)
- New Mountain Hill Elementary School (Fortson)
- Park Elementary School (Hamilton)
- Pine Ridge Elementary School (Ellerslie)
- Creekside Intermediate School (grades 5–6) (Cataula)
- Harris County Carver Middle School (Hamilton)
- Harris County High School (Hamilton)

== Notable people ==
- Reuben J. Crews, father of C.C. Crews and a colonel in the Georgia Militia
- Josh Pate, college football podcast host with 247Sports
- Benjamin Franklin White, clerk of the Inferior Court of Harris County, mayor of Whitesville, and compiler of the shape note songbook known as The Sacred Harp

== See also ==
- National Register of Historic Places listings in Harris County, Georgia
- List of counties in Georgia
- USNS Harris County (T-LST-822)
