= Hamilton, Georgia =

- City
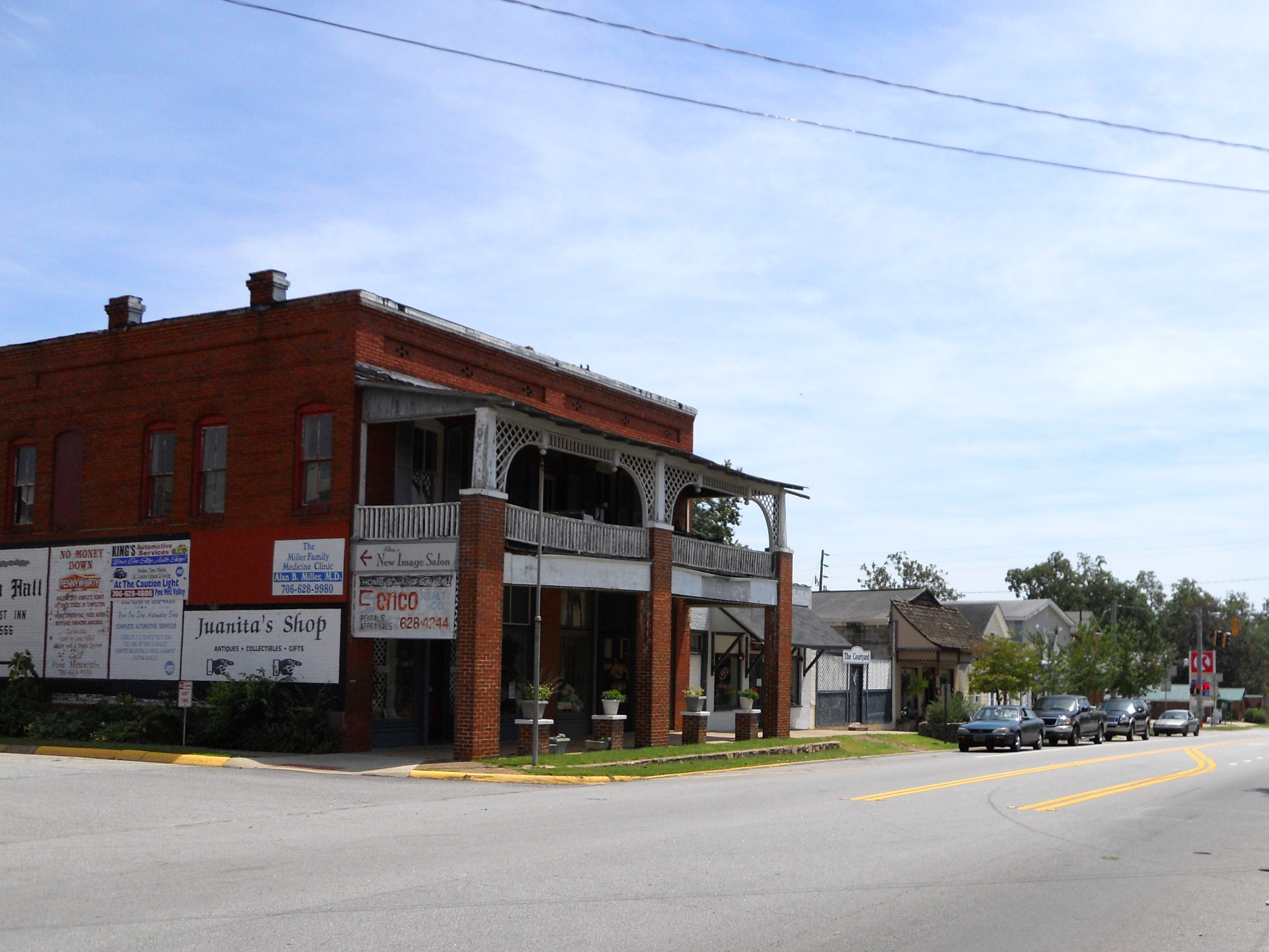
- Hamilton, Georgia
- Motto: "The heart of Harris County"
- Location in Harris County and the state of Georgia
- Coordinates: 32°45′53″N 84°52′23″W
- Country: United States
- State: Georgia
- County: Harris
- Named for: Paul Hamilton

Area
  - Total: 3.41 sq mi (8.84 km^{2})
  - Land: 3.41 sq mi (8.84 km^{2})
  - Water: 0 sq mi (0.00 km^{2})
- Elevation: 771 ft (235 m)

Population (2020)
  - Total: 1,680
  - Density: 492.1/sq mi (190.02/km^{2})
- Time zone: UTC-5 (Eastern (EST))
  - Summer (DST): UTC-4 (EDT)
- ZIP code: 31811
- Area code: 706
- FIPS code: 13-36220
- GNIS feature ID: 0315055
- Website: hamiltoncityhall.net

Hamilton is a city in, and the county seat of Harris County, Georgia, United States. It is part of the Columbus, Georgia metropolitan area. The population was 1,680 at the 2020 census, up from 307 at the 2000 census.

== History ==
Hamilton was founded in 1827 as seat of the newly formed Harris County. It was incorporated as a town in 1828 and as a city in 1903.

The city was named for U.S. Secretary of the Navy and governor of South Carolina Paul Hamilton (1762–1816).

In 1912, a black woman and three black men in Hamilton were lynched while being held for questioning in the murder of a white landowner. Coverage by local newspapers at the time suggested the four were guilty.

== Geography ==
Hamilton is located slightly northeast of the center of Harris County, at the southern base of the Pine Mountain Range in the Piedmont region of the state.

According to the United States Census Bureau, the city has a total area of 3.3 square miles (8.6 km^{2}), all land.

== Demographics ==
Historical population
Census	Pop.	Note	%±
1870	359		—
1880	493		37.3%
1900	418		—
1910	403		−3.6%
1920	437		8.4%
1930	438		0.2%
1940	473		8.0%
1950	449		−5.1%
1960	396		−11.8%
1970	357		−9.8%
1980	495		38.7%
1990	454		−8.3%
2000	307		−32.4%
2010	1,016		230.9%
2020	1,680		65.4%
U.S. Decennial Census

=== 2020 census ===
As of the 2020 census, Hamilton had a population of 1,680. The median age was 32.2 years. 31.3% of residents were under the age of 18, and 8.1% were 65 years of age or older. For every 100 females there were 115.1 males, and for every 100 females age 18 and over there were 116.9 males age 18 and over.

0.0% of residents lived in urban areas, while 100.0% lived in rural areas.

There were 464 households in Hamilton, of which 57.3% had children under the age of 18 living in them. Of all households, 61.6% were married-couple households, 12.1% were households with a male householder and no spouse or partner present, and 22.4% were households with a female householder and no spouse or partner present. About 12.5% of all households were made up of individuals, and 6.1% had someone living alone who was 65 years of age or older.

There were 498 housing units, of which 6.8% were vacant. The homeowner vacancy rate was 2.0%, and the rental vacancy rate was 2.9%.

Racial composition as of the 2020 census
Race	Number	Percent
White	1,000	59.5%
Black or African American	482	28.7%
American Indian and Alaska Native	1	0.1%
Asian	14	0.8%
Native Hawaiian and Other Pacific Islander	0	0.0%
Some other race	47	2.8%
Two or more races	136	8.1%
Hispanic or Latino (of any race)	83	4.9%

=== 2010 census ===
As of the 2010 census, there were 1,016 people, 339 households, and 179 families residing in the city.

== Education ==
The city is home to three of the seven schools in the county:

- Park Elementary School
- Harris County Carver Middle School
- Harris County High School

== Infrastructure ==
Highways in Hamilton include U.S. Route 27 and Georgia State Route 116.

== See also ==
- National Register of Historic Places listings in Harris County, Georgia
