= Georgia State Route 127 =

State highway in Georgia, United States

State Route 127
- SR 127 highlighted in red

Route information
- Maintained by GDOT
- Length: 65.6 mi (105.6 km)
- Existed: 1934–present

Major junctions
- West end: SR 41 north of Buena Vista
- SR 128 in northwestern Macon County; US 19 / SR 3 in Rupert; US 41 / SR 7 in Perry; I-75 in Perry; US 41 / US 341 / SR 7 / SR 11 in Perry
- East end: US 129 / SR 247 in Kathleen

Location
- Country: United States
- State: Georgia
- Counties: Marion, Taylor, Macon, Houston

Highway system
- Georgia State Highway System; Interstate; US; State; Special
← SR 126	→ SR 128

State Route 127 (SR 127) is a 65.6-mile-long (105.6 km) state highway that runs west-to-east through portions of Marion, Taylor, Macon, and Houston counties in the west-central and central parts of the U.S. state of Georgia. It connects the north-central part of Marion County with the Perry–Warner Robins area.

== Route description ==
SR 49 and SR 127 in the East Main Street Residential Historic District of Marshallville

SR 127 begins at an intersection with SR 41, about halfway between Buena Vista and Juniper, in Marion County. It heads east to an intersection with SR 240 (Ronnie Road). About one mile (1.6 km) later is the northern terminus of SR 240 Connector. It heads north into Taylor County, and meets SR 90 in Mauk. The two routes head concurrent to the southeast. In Charing. There, SR 137 joins the concurrency for a short while. SR 90/SR 127 continue to the east-southeast until they meet U.S. Route 19 (US 19) and SR 3, southwest of Rupert. From this point, the four routes travel concurrently into the town. In the southern part of the town, SR 127 splits off to the east-northeast and has another intersection with SR 90 before leaving Rupert.

The highway crosses into Macon County, thereafter it shares a brief concurrency with SR 128. Then, it meets SR 49 and runs concurrent with it to Marshallville. A few miles to the east, it briefly runs along the Macon–Houston county line. It enters Houston County proper for a very short stretch, runs along the Houston–Peach county line very briefly, and re-enters Houston County proper. Southwest of Perry, SR 127 meets and runs concurrent with SR 224 into the city. In Perry, it intersects US 41/SR 7, which join the concurrency. Almost immediately, they meet an interchange with Interstate 75 (I-75). A short distance later, SR 224 splits off to the southeast, while US 41/SR 7/SR 127 head northeast into the main part of the city on Courtney Hodges Boulevard and Commerce Street. At Ball Street is SR 341/SR 11 Business. At this intersection, SR 7 turns onto US 341 north, while SR 11 Business joins the concurrency. The road continues along Commerce Street and turns north onto Macon Road. At Swift Street, SR 127 departs to the east, while US 41/SR 11 Business continues to the north-northeast SR 127 continues to the northeast, through urban areas of the county, until it meets its eastern terminus, an intersection with US 129/SR 247 in Kathleen.

There are only two parts of SR 127 that are part of the National Highway System, a system of roadways important to the nation's economy, defense, and mobility. They are the following:

- In Perry
  - From the intersection of US 41/SR 7/SR 127 and SR 224 in the southwestern part of the city to the intersection of US 41/SR 11 Business and SR 127 in the central part of the city
- Perry–Warner Robins
  - From the intersection with Perry Parkway in the northeastern part of Perry to the intersection with South Houston Lake Road in the south-central part of Warner Robins

== History ==
=== Georgia's last river ferry ===
SR 127's crossing over the Flint River was the site of Georgia's last river ferry. The ferry across the Flint River was operated between the 1850s to 1988; however, the Georgia Highway Department assumed control of the ferry in the 1920s and made passage across the river free, though SR 127 would not be established until late 1934 and it was not until 1942 that the ferry would become designated as part of SR 127.

=== Creation and expansion ===
SR 127 first appears on the January 1935 Georgia Highway Department map roughly along present-day SR 96 between Jeffersonville and Irwinton. It was extended southwest through Perry to SR 49 in Marshallville in early 1937, though the river crossing over the Ocmulgee River would become impassable in late 1939. It would next be extended to SR 90 using the Flint River ferry to Ideal in 1942. In the following year, it was extended further west to meet SR 137 northeast of Tazewell. In 1945 SR 127 was extended further west to end at SR 103 just short of crossing into Muscogee County. With a total length of about 120 miles (190 km) this would be the greatest extent of the route.

=== Route reduction ===
Fort Benning was expanded to the east between 1949 and 1950 and SR 127 was shortened to terminate at its current western terminus at SR 41. In the mid-1950s SR 96 had a bridge built across the Ocmulgee River not too far north of where SR 127's crossing had been up until 1939. Following the completion of the bridge on SR 96, the section of SR 127 from Tarversville to Irwinton was redesignated as SR 96 and the section of SR 127 between the river and US 129/SR 247 at Kathleen was decommissioned. Since the 1950s, only minor adjustments have been made to the highway's routing.

== Major intersections ==
County	Location	mi	km	Destinations	Notes
Marion		0.0	0.0	SR 41 – Buena Vista, Geneva	Western terminus
Marion		5.8	9.3	SR 240 (Ronnie Road) – Tazewell, Geneva	
Marion		7.0	11.3	SR 240 Conn. south	Northern terminus of SR 240 Conn.
Taylor	Mauk	10.0	16.1	SR 90 west – Junction City	Western end of SR 90 concurrency
Taylor	Charing	14.7	23.7	SR 137 north – Butler	Western end of SR 137 concurrency
Taylor		16.4	26.4	SR 137 south – Tazewell	Eastern end of SR 137 concurrency
Taylor		21.4	34.4	US 19 south / SR 3 south	Western end of US 19/SR 3 concurrency
Taylor		22.4	36.0	US 19 north / SR 3 north / SR 90 east	Eastern end of US 19/SR 3 and SR 90 concurrencies
Taylor		23.8	38.3	SR 90 – Ideal	
Taylor		27.9	44.9	Crossroad School Road	Former SR 195 north
Macon		29.6	47.6	Marvis Chapman Road	Former SR 195 south
Macon		35.0	56.3	SR 128 north – Reynolds	Western end of SR 128 concurrency
Macon		35.5	57.1	SR 128 south – Oglethorpe	Eastern end of SR 128 concurrency
Macon		39.7	63.9	SR 49 south – Montezuma	Western end of SR 128 concurrency
Macon	Marshallville	43.8	70.5	SR 49 north – Fort Valley	Eastern end of SR 128 concurrency
Houston		53.0	85.3	SR 224 west – Montezuma	Western end of SR 224 concurrency
Houston	Perry	55.1	88.7	US 41 south / SR 7 south	Western end of US 41/SR 7 concurrency
Houston	Perry	55.1	88.7	I-75 (SR 401) – Valdosta, Macon	I-75 exit 135
Houston	Perry	55.4	89.2	SR 224 east (Golden Isles Parkway) – Clinchfield	Eastern end of SR 224 concurrency
Houston	Perry	56.8	91.4	US 341 / SR 7 north / SR 11 Bus. south (Ball Street)	Eastern end of SR 7 concurrency; western end of SR 11 Bus. concurrency
Houston	Perry	57.0	91.7	US 41 north / SR 11 Bus. north (Macon Road)	Eastern end of US 41 and SR 11 Bus. concurrencies
Houston	Perry	58.8	94.6	US 341 Byp. / SR 11 (Perry Parkway)	
Houston	Kathleen	65.6	105.6	US 129 / SR 247	Eastern terminus
1.000 mi = 1.609 km; 1.000 km = 0.621 mi: Concurrency terminus
