= Georgia State Route 90 =

State highway in Georgia, United States

State Route 90
- SR 90 highlighted in red

Route information
- Maintained by GDOT
- Length: 155 mi (249 km)

Major junctions
- South end: US 82 / SR 520 in Willacoochee
- US 129 / SR 11 from Ocilla to Fitzgerald; US 319 / SR 32 / SR 35 in Ocilla; US 280 / SR 30 in Cordele; I-75 / I-75 BL in Cordele; US 41 / SR 7 from Cordele to Vienna; US 19 / SR 3 in Rupert; SR 96 / SR 540 in Junction City
- West end: US 80 / SR 22 / SR 41 / SR 208 in Talbotton

Location
- Country: United States
- State: Georgia
- Counties: Atkinson, Coffee, Irwin, Ben Hill, Turner, Wilcox, Crisp, Dooly, Macon, Taylor, Talbot

Highway system
- Georgia State Highway System; Interstate; US; State; Special
← SR 89	→ SR 91

State Route 90 (SR 90) is a 155-mile-long (249 km) state highway that travels southeast-to-northwest through portions of Atkinson, Coffee, Irwin, Ben Hill, Turner, Wilcox, Crisp, Dooly, Macon, Taylor, and Talbot counties in the south-central and west-central parts of the U.S. state of Georgia. The highway connects Willacoochee and Talbotton, via Ocilla, Fitzgerald, Cordele, Vienna and Oglethorpe.

The portion of the highway in Junction City, that is concurrent with SR 96, is part of the Fall Line Freeway, a divided highway that spans the state from Columbus to Augusta, and is also signed as SR 540. The Fall Line Freeway is planned to be incorporated into the proposed eastern extension of Interstate 14 (I-14), a freeway that is currently entirely within Central Texas and may be extended to Augusta.

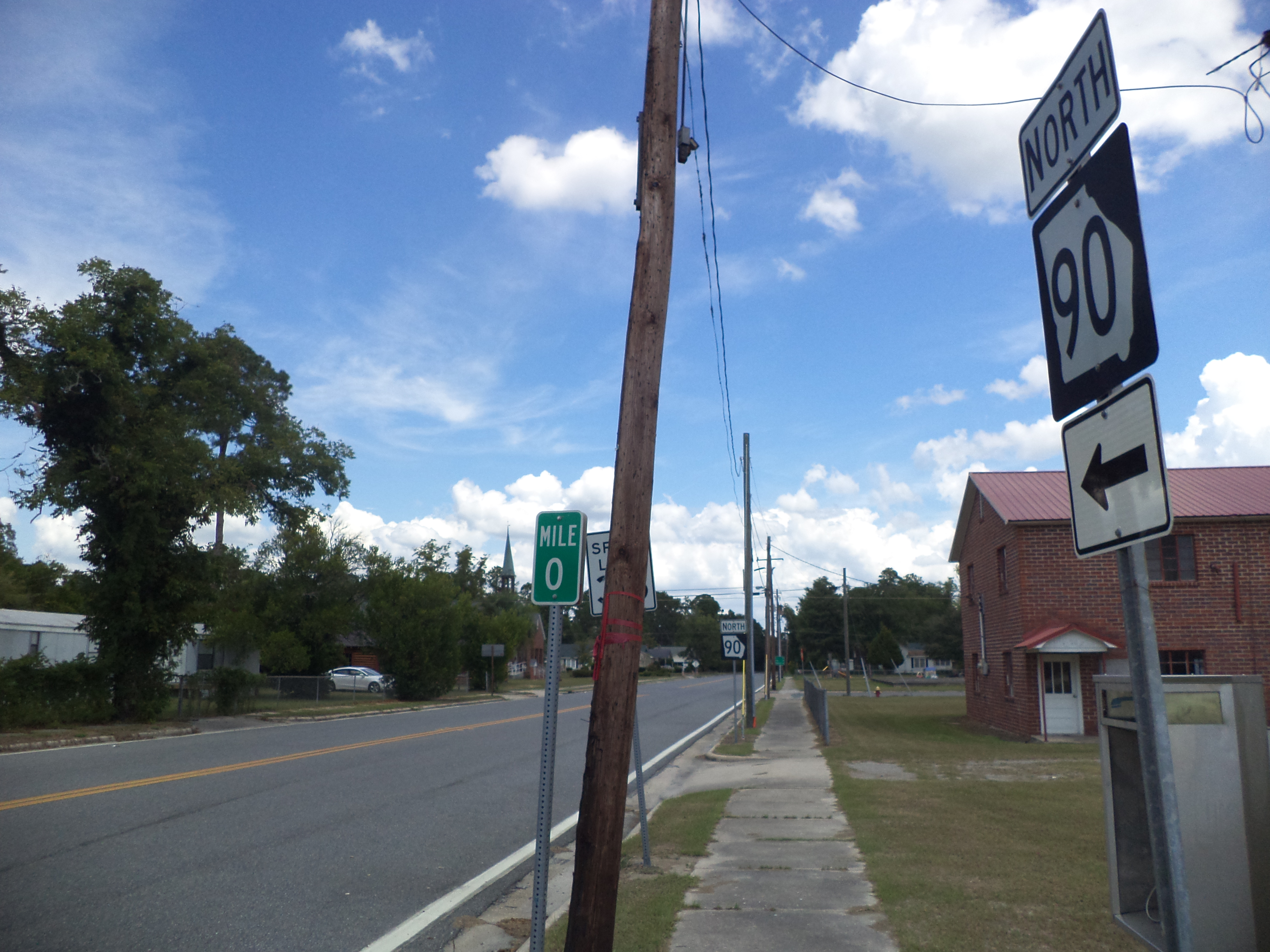
The southern terminus of SR 90 in Willacoochee, Atkinson County

== Route description ==
SR 90 begins at an intersection with US 82/SR 520 (Main Street) in Willacoochee, within Atkinson County. It heads north-northeast on North Vickers Street and curves to the northwest. Just outside the town's limits, it meets the southern terminus of SR 149. It continues to the northwest and crosses into Coffee County. The highway doesn't intersect with any major highways in Coffee County, except for SR 158 on the Coffee–Irwin county line. In Irwin County, the highway passes through rural areas of the county and enters the southern part of Ocilla. There, it intersects US 129/SR 11 (South Irwin Avenue). The three routes head concurrent to the north, past Cumbee Park to an intersection with US 319/SR 32/SR 35 (4th Street). At this intersection, US 319 joins the concurrency, while SR 35 meets its northern terminus. They pass Irwin County Hospital and Ocilla Country Club. They also enters Ben Hill County just before passing Lake Beatrice. In the southern part of Fitzgerald, they meet SR 107 (Benjamin H. Hill Drive), which acts as a partial bypass of the city. At Central Avenue, US 319 departs to the east, concurrent with SR 107. At Sultana Drive, SR 90 splits off to the west. Then, at Dewey McGlamry Road, it turns to the north. The highway heads to the north-northwest and meets the southern terminus of SR 215, which takes on the "Dewey McGlamry Road" name, while SR 90 heads west on Salem Church Road. The route intersects the southern terminus of SR 233 (Sundew Road) and curves to the southwest and crosses into Turner County before entering Rebecca. In town, it meets SR 112 (Ashley Street West). They run concurrent through town until SR 112 departs to the north on Sylvester Road, while SR 90 heads to the northwest on North Railroad Street. West-northwest of town is a concurrency with SR 159. This concurrency ends at the Turner–Wilcox county line. SR 90 heads west along the county line and briefly enters Wilcox County proper. After that, it enters Crisp County. On the southeastern edge of Cordele, it intersects the eastern terminus of SR 33 Connector (Rockhouse Road East). Approximately 1 mile (1.6 km) later is the northern terminus of SR 300 (Georgia–Florida Parkway). Another mile later is US 280/SR 30 (16th Avenue East). The three highways head concurrent to the west, into the main part of town. Almost immediately is an interchange with Interstate 75 (I-75). In downtown is an intersection with US 41/SR 7 (7th Street South). Here, SR 90 turns north. The three routes enter Dooly County before entering Vienna. In town, it intersects SR 27 (Union Street). The two highways head concurrent to the west and split apart just before leaving town. SR 90 passes through Lilly before entering Byromville. In town, it meets SR 230 (Church Avenue). The two routes run concurrent through town, until SR 230 departs to the south on Davis Avenue. Farther to the northwest, the road crosses into Macon County. The road intersects SR 26/SR 224 (Spaulding Road). The two routes have a rief concurrency, until the Flint River Community Hospital, where SR 90 curves to the north-northeast, to an intersection with SR 49 (North Dooly Street). SR 49/SR 90 run concurrent over the Flint River, into Oglethorpe. They intersect SR 128. At this intersection, SR 49/SR 128 head south on Chatham Street, while SR 90/SR 128 head north on Sumter Street. Just before leaving town is the northern terminus of SR 128 Bypass (West Bypass). A little ways north of town, SR 90 departs to the northwest to the town of Ideal. Northwest of town, it enters Taylor County. It meets SR 127 just before entering Rupert. There, it begins a brief concurrency with US 19/SR 3. Less than 1 mile (1.6 km) later, SR 127 joins the concurrency. The four routes run concurrent for just over 1 mile. Then, SR 90/SR 127 split off to the west-northwest. They have a concurrency with SR 137. In the town of Mauk, SR 127 splits off to the south. To the north-northwest, the road crosses into Talbot County. In Junction City, it meets SR 96/SR 540 (Fall Line Freeway), and they travel concurrently to a point just west of town. Northwest of town, in Talbotton, it meets SR 208 (Old Wire Road). The two roads begin a concurrency to the west. Then, they pass the Oak Hill Cemetery, before they meet an intersection with US 80/SR 22/SR 41 (Washington Avenue). At this intersection, SR 90 meets its western terminus, and SR 208 begins a concurrency with US 80/SR 22/SR 41 to the north.

The following portions of SR 90 are part of the National Highway System, a system of routes determined to be the most important for the nation's economy, mobility, and defense:

- From the southern end of the US 280/SR 30 concurrency, in the southeastern part of Cordele, to a point on US 41/SR 7 north of the city, just south of the Crisp–Dooly county line.
- The entire length of the SR 26 concurrency in Montezuma
- The entire length of the US 19/SR 3 concurrency in the Rupert area
- The entire length of the SR 96/SR 540 concurrency in Junction City

== Major intersections ==
County	Location	mi	km	Destinations	Notes
Atkinson	Willacoochee	0.0	0.0	US 82 / SR 520 (Main Street) – Alapaha, Pearson	Southern terminus
Atkinson		1.1	1.8	Bridgetown Road north – Palmetto Pines Plantation	Former southern terminus of SR 149
Coffee	No major junctions				
Coffee–Irwin county line		10.9	17.5	SR 158 (Waterby Road) to US 129 – Douglas	
Irwin	Ocilla	22.6	36.4	US 129 south / SR 11 south (Irwin Avenue) / Five Bridge Road south – Alapaha	Southern end of US 129/SR 11 concurrency; northern terminus of Five Bridge Road
Irwin	Ocilla	23.1	37.2	US 319 south / SR 32 / SR 35 south (Fourth Street) – Tifton, Douglas	Southern end of US 319 concurrency; northern terminus of SR 35
Ben Hill	Fitzgerald	30.2	48.6	US 319 north / SR 107 (Central Avenue) to I-75 – McRae	Northern end of US 319 concurrency; SR 107 west provides access to Phoebe Dorminy Medical Center
Ben Hill	Fitzgerald	32.5	52.3	US 129 north / SR 11 north (Sherman Street) / Sultana Drive east	Northern end of US 129/SR 11 concurrency; northbound lanes of US 129/SR 11/SR 90 on one-way pair; Sultana Drive continues past intersection.
Ben Hill	Fitzgerald	32.6	52.5	US 129 south (Grant Street / SR 11 south) – Ocilla	Southbound lanes of US 129/SR 11/SR 90 on one-way pair; provides access to Phoebe Dorminy Medical Center
Ben Hill		41.3	66.5	SR 215 north (Dewey McGlamry Road) / Salem Church Road east – Rochelle	Southern terminus of SR 215; western terminus of Salem Church Road
Ben Hill		48.5	78.1	SR 233 north (Sundew Road) – Rochelle	Southern terminus of SR 233
Turner	Rebecca	52.5	84.5	SR 112 south (West Ashley Street west) – Ashburn	Southern end of SR 112 concurrency
Turner	Rebecca	52.8	85.0	SR 112 north (Sylvester Road) – Rochelle, Hawkinsville	Northern end of SR 112 concurrency
Turner		57.3	92.2	SR 159 south (North Street) – Ashburn	Southern end of SR 159 concurrency
Turner–Wilcox county line		59.4	95.6	SR 159 north – Pitts	Northern end of SR 159 concurrency
Wilcox	No major junctions				
Crisp	Cordele	72.6	116.8	To I-75 / SR 300	
Crisp	Cordele	73.9	118.9	US 280 east / SR 30 east (16th Avenue East) / Midway Road north – Abbeville	Southern end of US 280/SR 30 concurrency; southern terminus of Midway Road
Crisp	Cordele	74.2– 74.2	119.4– 119.4	I-75 (SR 401) to SR 300 – Albany, Macon	Southern end of I-75 Bus. concurrency; southern terminus of I-75 Bus.; I-75 exit 101
Crisp	Cordele	76.1	122.5	US 41 south (South 7th Street south / SR 7 south) / US 280 west / SR 30 west (16th Avenue West west) – Ashburn, Americus, Andersonville Nat'l. Hist. Site, Jimmy Carter Nat'l. Hist. Site, The Andersonville Trial, Excursion Train	Northern end of US 280/SR 30 concurrency; southern end of US 41/SR 7 concurrency
Crisp		79.2	127.5	Farmers Market Road east (I-75 Bus. north) to I-75	Northern end of I-75 Bus. concurrency
Dooly	Vienna	85.4	137.4	US 41 north / SR 7 north (3rd Street) / SR 27 east (Union Street) to I-75 – Unadilla, Hawkinsville	Northern end of US 41/SR 7 concurrency; southern end of SR 27 concurrency
Dooly	Vienna	86.4	139.0	SR 27 west / Ford Street north – Americus, Andersonville Nat'l. Hist. Site, Jimmy Carter Nat'l. Hist. Site	Northern end of SR 27 concurrency; southern terminus of Ford Street
Dooly	Sandy Mount Creek	88.2– 88.3	141.9– 142.1	Allen B. Fulford Memorial Bridge	
Dooly	Little Pennahatchee Creek	89.9– 89.9	144.7– 144.7	Toombs Taylor Morgan Memorial Bridge	
Dooly		96.0	154.5	SR 230 Conn. north (Church Avenue)	Southern terminus of SR 230 Conn.
Dooly	Byromville	96.4	155.1	SR 230 east (Main Street) – Unadilla	Southern end of SR 230 concurrency
Dooly	Byromville	96.6	155.5	SR 230 west (Davis Avenue) – Americus	Northern end of SR 230 concurrency
Hogcrawl Creek		100.8– 100.8	162.2– 162.2	Herbert A. Saliba Bridge	
Macon	Montezuma	105.5	169.8	SR 26 east / SR 224 east (Spaulding Road) – Perry, Hawkinsville	Southern end of SR 26 concurrency; western terminus of SR 224
Macon	Montezuma	106.2	170.9	SR 26 west (Walnut Street) / Dooly Street south – Ellaville, Flint River Nursery	Northern end of SR 26 concurrency
Macon	Montezuma	106.7	171.7	SR 49 north (North Dooly Street north) / East Railroad Street east – Marshallville	Southern end of SR 49 concurrency; western terminus of East Railroad Street
Macon	Flint River and Buck Creek	107.5– 107.8	173.0– 173.5	T.L. Coogle Memorial Bridge	
Macon	Oglethorpe	108.7	174.9	SR 49 south / SR 128 south (Andersonville Trail) / Clifton Bradley Drive south – Americus	Northern end of SR 49 concurrency; southern end of SR 128 concurrency; northern terminus of Clifton Bradley Drive
Macon	Oglethorpe	109.6	176.4	SR 128 Byp. south (SR 49 Truck south) – Americus	Northern end of SR 49 Truck concurrency; northern terminus of SR 128 Byp.
Macon		110.7	178.2	SR 49 Truck north / SR 128 north – Reynolds	Northern end of SR 49 Truck and SR 128 concurrencies
Macon	Ideal	118.8	191.2	Cemetery Road	Former SR 195
Macon	Cedar Creek	119.6– 119.6	192.5– 192.5	J.L. Turner Bridge	
Macon		119.7	192.6	Raiload Street	Former SR 195
Taylor		125.3	201.7	SR 127 – Mauk, Marshallville	
Taylor	Rupert	126.7	203.9	US 19 north / SR 3 north / J. Ram Cooper Road west – Butler	Southern end of US 19/SR 3 concurrency; eastern terminus of J. Ram Cooper Road
Taylor	Unnamed creek and railroad tracks of CSX	126.8– 126.8	204.1– 204.1	Sgt. William Morgan Callahan Memorial Bridge	
Taylor		127.2	204.7	SR 127 east – Ellaville	Southern end of SR 127 concurrency
Taylor		128.2	206.3	US 19 south / SR 3 south – Ellaville, Americus	Northern end of US 19/SR 3 concurrency
Taylor		133.2	214.4	SR 137 south – Buena Vista	Southern end of SR 137 concurrency
Taylor		134.9	217.1	SR 137 north – Butler	Northern end of SR 137 concurrency
Taylor	Mauk	139.6	224.7	SR 127 south – Tazewell	Northern end of SR 127 concurrency
Talbot	Junction City	146.6	235.9	SR 96 east / SR 540 east (Fall Line Freeway) / Buckner Road north – Butler, Junction City	Southern end of SR 96/SR 540 concurrency; southern terminus of Buckner Road
Talbot		148.2	238.5	Old SR 96 east – Junction City	Western terminus of Old SR 96; former SR 96 east
Talbot		148.6	239.1	SR 96 west / SR 540 west (Fall Line Freeway) – Geneva, Columbus	Northern end of SR 96/SR 540 concurrency
Talbot	Talbotton	154.4	248.5	SR 208 east (Old Wire Road) – Roberta	Southern end of SR 208 concurrency
Talbot	Talbotton	155.0	249.4	US 80 / SR 41 / SR 208 west (South Washington Avenue / SR 22) – Geneva, Manchester, Waverly Hall, Roberta, FDR's Little White House	Northern end of SR 208 concurrency; northern terminus
1.000 mi = 1.609 km; 1.000 km = 0.621 mi: Concurrency terminus
