= Georgia State Route 49 =

State highway in Georgia, United States

State Route 49
- Georgia State Route 49 highlighted in red

Route information
- Maintained by GDOT
- Length: 122.8 mi (197.6 km)

Major junctions
- Southwest end: SR 45 north of Dawson
- US 19 / SR 3 / SR 30 in Americus; I-75 / SR 540 in Byron; US 41 / SR 11 northeast of Byron; US 80 / SR 22 in Macon; US 80 / US 129 / SR 11 in Macon; US 23 / US 129 / SR 11 / SR 87 in Macon; I-16 / SR 540 in Macon; US 23 / SR 19 in Macon
- Northeast end: SR 22 / SR 24 in Milledgeville

Location
- Country: United States
- State: Georgia
- Counties: Terrell, Sumter, Macon, Peach, Houston, Bibb, Jones, Baldwin

Highway system
- Georgia State Highway System; Interstate; US; State; Special
← SR 48	→ SR 50

State Route 49 (SR 49) is a 122.8-mile-long (197.6 km) state highway that travels southwest-to-northeast through portions of Terrell, Sumter, Macon, Peach, Houston, Bibb, Jones, and Baldwin counties, mainly in the central part of the U.S. state of Georgia. The highway connects SR 45 north of Dawson to SR 22/SR 24 in Milledgeville.

== Route description ==
SR 49 begins at an intersection with SR 45 (Plains Highway) at a point about 5.6 miles (9.0 km) north of Dawson, in Terrell County. It heads to the northeast and crosses over Kinchafoonee Creek into Sumter County. The highway continues to the northeast. It passes through rural areas of the county and crosses an intersection with SR 308, called Croxton Crossroads. It curves to the north past Koinonia Community Lake. The route then curves back to the north-northeast and intersects US 280/SR 27 southwest of Americus. The three highways run concurrently to the northeast. Approximately 4,000 feet (1,200 m) later, US 19/SR 3 (South Martin Luther King Boulevard) join the concurrency. Immediately, the five routes enter Americus. About 3,000 feet (910 m) later, US 19/SR 3 split off to the northeast on North Martin Luther King Boulevard, while US 280/SR 27/SR 49 turn to the east on West Lamar Street. On the east side of town, SR 49 departs to the north on Tripp Street and meets the westbound lanes of US 280/SR 27/SR 49 (Forsyth Street), before heading northeast again. It passes Argo Lake and the Jimmy Carter Regional Airport on its way out of town. Before leaving the county, the highway passes John James Lake, Tharpe Lake, and Charles Reeves Lake. Then, it curves to the north and meets the northern terminus of SR 195 (Bailey Avenue). About 2,000 feet (610 m) farther to the north, it begins to run along the Sumter–Macon county line and passes through the western part of Andersonville National Historic Site and east of the town of Andersonville. Then, it crosses into Macon County proper and resumes its northeastern routing, passing through the extreme northern part of the historic site. The route passes through Clearview, before approaching Oglethorpe. Just southwest of town, is an intersection with SR 26 and SR 49 Truck/SR 128. At this intersection, SR 49/SR 49 Truck/SR 128 head northeast into town concurrently. They meet the southern terminus of SR 128 Bypass (West Bypass) and pass Oglethorpe Cemetery. At Sumter Street, they intersect SR 90; SR 90/SR 128 head to the northwest, and SR 49/SR 90 curve to the east. They cross over the Flint River and enter Montezuma. At Dooly Street, the two routes divide, with SR 90 heading south-southwest and SR 49 heading to the north-northeast. SR 49 passes through rural areas of the county and has a concurrency with SR 127 that ends in Marshallville. A little farther to the north-northeast, the highway runs along the Macon–Peach county line before entering Peach County proper. It continues to the northeast, toward Fort Valley. Just before entering town, it meets the western terminus of University Boulevard, which leads to Fort Valley State University and serves as a southern bypass route of town. In Fort Valley, the highway passes Oak Lawn Cemetery, before entering the main part of town. There, it intersects US 341/SR 7/SR 96 (Oakland Heights Parkway). In the northeastern part of town, SR 49 passes Peach Regional Medical Center, before it leaves town. Then, it meets the eastern terminus of SR 49 Connector and SR 540 (Buddy Reddick Memorial Parkway / Fall Line Freeway). Here, SR 540 joins SR 49 in a concurrency. From this intersection, the next 9.8 miles (15.8 km) of road is part of the Fall Line Freeway, an expressway that connects Columbus and Augusta. Northeast of Fort Valley, SR 49/SR 540 passes the Pine Needles Country Club. In Powersville, the two highways meet the western terminus of SR 247 Connector (Centerville Road). In Byron, it meets the eastern terminus of SR 42, before having an interchange with Interstate 75 (I-75), where SR 540 and the Fall Line Freeway depart to the north. The highway continues to the northeast and travels along the Peach–Houston county line. Almost immediately after its county line section, it intersects US 41/SR 11. The three highways head concurrently to the northeast on Industrial Highway. Then, they enter Houston County, where they pass Vinsons Lake. Slightly to the northeast, they cross over Echeconnee Creek into Bibb County. The concurrent routes pass northwest of Middle Georgia Regional Airport, before curving to the north. Approximately 1.5 miles (2.4 km) south of Macon, US 129/SR 247 (Hawkinsville Road) join the concurrency. The five highways cross over the Tobesofkee and Rocky creeks and enter Macon. Just over 1,000 feet (300 m) into the city, is a major intersection. US 41/SR 247 (Pio Nono Avenue) head northwest to the left, Houston Avenue heads north straight ahead, and US 129/SR 11/SR 49 (Broadway) head north-northeast to the right, concurrent with US 41 Business. The four highways continue to an intersection with US 80/SR 22 (Eisenhower Parkway), which join the concurrency. They head northeast into the main part of the city. At Walnut Street, US 41 Business/SR 22/SR 49 head northwest, while US 80/US 129/SR 11 continue to the northeast. At 2nd Street, SR 22 splits off to the northeast, while US 41 Business/SR 49 continue to the northwest and intersect SR 19. Here, US 41 Business travels to the southwest and west concurrent with SR 19, while SR 19/SR 49 head northeast. Two blocks later, they intersect US 23/US 129/SR 11/SR 87. At this intersection, US 23/US 129/SR 11/SR 19/SR 49 head northeast and cross over the Ocmulgee River. On the northern side of the river is an interchange with I-16/SR 540 (Fall Line Freeway). Immediately afterward, US 23/SR 19 split off to the east onto Emery Highway, while US 129/SR 11/SR 49 continue to the northeast. Approximately 1,000 feet (300 m) later, SR 22 rejoins the concurrency. The four highways continue northeast until SR 49 departs to the east on Shurling Drive. It cuts across a corner of Jones County before re-entering Bibb County. The highway passes Bowden Golf Course and enters Jones County again. It passes through rural areas of the county and crosses an intersection with SR 18, called Greenberry Crossroads. The highway continues to the northeast and enters Baldwin County. It runs along the Milledgeville–Hardwick line, where it intersects US 441/SR 29 (West Bypass Road). Then, the highway curves to the northwest, crossing over Fishing Creek into Milledgeville city proper. SR 49 passes Central City Park and then intersects US 441 Business/SR 29 Bus. (Clark Street) on the southwestern corner of Georgia College & State University. A few blocks farther to the east-northeast, it meets its northern terminus, an intersection with SR 22/SR 24 (North Elbert Street/East Hancock Street). This intersection also marks the former northern terminus of SR 112, which used South Elbert Street.

The following portions of SR 49 are part of the National Highway System, a system of routes determined to be the most important for the nation's economy, mobility, and defense:

- The entire length of the US 280/SR 27 concurrency in the Americus area
- From the eastern terminus of SR 49 Conn. at the southwestern city limits of Fort Valley, to I-75 in Byron
- From the southern end of the US 129/SR 247 concurrency south of Rutland to the intersection with US 41 Bus./SR 247 in the southern part of Macon
- From the northern end of the US 80 and SR 11 concurrencies in the northeastern part of Macon to its northern terminus

== Major intersections ==
County	Location	mi	km	Destinations	Notes
Terrell		0.0	0.0	SR 45 (Plains Highway) – Plains, Dawson	Southern terminus
Kinchafoonee Creek		4.3	6.9	Wayne T. Goode Bridge	
Sumter		9.3	15.0	SR 308 (Bonds Trail Road) – Plains, Smithville	
Sumter		17.6	28.3	US 280 west / SR 27 west – Plains	Southern end of US 280/SR 27 concurrency
Sumter		18.6	29.9	US 19 south / SR 3 south / Spring Street – Albany	Southern end of US 19/SR 3 concurrency
Sumter	Americus	19.5	31.4	US 19 north / SR 3 north / SR 30 west (South MLK Boulevard) – Ellaville, Buena Vista	Northern end of US 19/SR 3 concurrency; southern end of SR 30 concurrency
Sumter	Americus	20.2	32.5	SR 377 south (Lee Street)	Northern terminus of SR 377
Sumter	Americus	21.2	34.1	US 280 east / SR 27 east / SR 30 east (East Lamar Street) – Vienna, Cordele	Northern end of US 280/SR 30 and SR 27 concurrencies
Sumter	Americus	21.2	34.1	US 280 east / SR 27 east / SR 30 east (Forsyth Street)	Northern end of US 280/SR 30 and SR 27 concurrencies (westbound lanes on one-way pair)
Sumter		30.6	49.2	SR 195 south – Leslie	Northern terminus of SR 195
Sumter–Macon county line	Andersonville	31.6	50.9	SR 228 west (Ellaville Street) – Andersonville	Eastern terminus of SR 228; former SR 195
Macon		38.1	61.3	SR 26 – Montezuma	Southern end of SR 128 concurrency
Macon		39.2	63.1	SR 128 Byp. north (West Bypass) – Reynolds, Ideal	Southern terminus of SR 128 Byp.
Macon	Oglethorpe	40.2	64.7	SR 90 west / SR 128 north (Sumter Street) – Ideal, Reynolds	Northern end of SR 128 concurrency; southern end of SR 90 concurrency
Macon	Montezuma	42.1	67.8	SR 90 east (South Dooly Street) – Byromville	Northern end of SR 90 concurrency
Macon		51.8	83.4	SR 127 west – Reynolds	Southern end of SR 127 concurrency
Macon	Marshallville	55.9	90.0	SR 127 east (Main Street) – Perry	Northern end of SR 127 concurrency
Peach	Fort Valley	64.1	103.2	US 341 / SR 7 / SR 96 (Commercial Heights / Vineville Street) – Roberta, Reynolds, Perry	
Peach		65.7	105.7	SR 49 Conn. west / SR 540 west (Fall Line Freeway) to US 341 north / SR 96 west – Butler	Southern end of SR 540 concurrency; eastern terminus of SR 49 Conn.
Peach		70.6	113.6	SR 247 Conn. east (Centerville Road) to I-75 south – Warner Robins, Robins AFB	Western terminus of SR 247 Conn.
Peach	Byron	74.3	119.6	SR 42 north – Knoxville, Roberta	Southern terminus of SR 42
Peach	Byron	75.4	121.3	I-75 (SR 401) / SR 540 east – Macon, Valdosta	Northern end of SR 540 concurrency; I-75 exit 149
Peach		77.8	125.2	US 41 south / SR 11 south	Southern end of US 41 and SR 11 concurrencies
Bibb		83.4	134.2	US 129 south / SR 247 south – Warner Robins	Southern end of US 129 and SR 247 concurrencies; interchange
Bibb				Houston Road	Interchange; no northbound exit
Bibb	Macon	86.4	139.0	US 41 north / SR 247 north (Pio NoNo Avenue) to I-75 / Houston Avenue – Forsyth	Northern end of US 41 and SR 247 concurrencies; southern terminus of US 41 Bus.; southern end of US 41 Bus. concurrency
Bibb	Macon	89.7	144.4	US 80 west / SR 22 west (Eisenhower Parkway) to I-75 – Roberta	Southern end of US 80/SR 22 concurrency
Bibb	Macon	91.6	147.4	US 80 east / US 129 north / SR 11 north (Martin Luther King Jr. Boulevard)	Northern end of US 80, US 129, and SR 11 concurrencies
Bibb	Macon	92.0	148.1	SR 22 east (Second Street)	Northern end of SR 22 concurrency
Bibb	Macon	92.3	148.5	US 41 Bus. north / SR 19 north (Spring Street)	Northern end of US 41 Bus. concurrency; southern end of SR 19 concurrency
Bibb	Macon	92.4	148.7	US 23 north / US 129 south / SR 11 south / SR 87 (Riverside Drive)	Southern end of US 23 and US 129/SR 11 concurrencies
Bibb	Macon	92.6	149.0	Spring Street Bridge over the Ocmulgee River	
Bibb	Macon	92.7	149.2	I-16 (SR 404) / SR 540 (Fall Line Freeway) to I-75 – Atlanta, Dublin, Savannah	I-16 east exit 1A; no access from SR 49 south to I-16 east
Bibb	Macon	92.8	149.3	US 23 south / SR 19 south	Northern end of US 23 and SR 19 concurrencies; no left turn southbound
Bibb	Macon	93.2	150.0	US 129 Alt. south / SR 22 west (Second Street) to I-16	Northern terminus of US 129 Alt.; southern end of SR 22 concurrency
Bibb	Macon	93.9	151.1	US 129 north / SR 11 north / SR 22 east (Gray Highway) – Gray, alternate route to Milledgeville	Northern end of US 129/SR 11 and SR 22 concurrencies
Jones		106.2	170.9	SR 18 – Gray, Gordon	
Baldwin	Milledgeville	121.0	194.7	US 441 / SR 29 – Eatonton, Irwinton, Central Georgia Technical College, Georgia Veterans Memorial Cemetery	
Baldwin	Milledgeville	122.3	196.8	US 441 Bus. / SR 29 Bus. (Clark Street) to US 441 / SR 22 east / SR 24 north – Eatonton, Irwinton, Dublin	
Baldwin	Milledgeville	122.8	197.6	SR 22 / SR 24 (North Elbert Street / East Hancock Street) – Georgia Veterans Memorial Cemetery, Central State Hospital, Oconee River Greenway and Riverwalk	Northern terminus; former SR 22 Conn./SR 24 Conn.; South Elbert Street is the former northern terminus of SR 112.
1.000 mi = 1.609 km; 1.000 km = 0.621 mi: Concurrency terminus

== Special routes ==
=== Fort Valley bypass route ===
State Route 49 Bypass
- Location: Northeast of Fort Valley

State Route 49 Bypass (SR 49 Bypass) is a proposed bypass route that is planned to exist completely within the southwestern part of Peach County, in the central part of the U.S. state of Georgia

The road is planned to connect SR 49 Connector (Buddy Reddick Memorial Parkway), at an intersection with the SR 49 mainline (Peach Parkway) northeast of Fort Valley to an intersection with SR 96 (Miami Valley Road), east of the town. There is a possibility that it and SR 49 Connector will be included as part of a bypass on all four sides of the town.

=== Fort Valley connector route ===
State Route 49 Connector
- Location: Northwest of Fort Valley
- Length: 4.7 mi (7.6 km)

State Route 49 Connector (SR 49 Connector) is a 4.7-mile-long (7.6 km) connector route that exists completely within the southwestern part of Peach County, in the central part of the U.S. state of Georgia. The road functions more like a bypass route around the northwest parts of Fort Valley. It connects SR 96/SR 540 west of the city with the SR 49 mainline and SR 540 northeast of the town. The entire length of this highway, like the mainline, is also concurrent with SR 540 and part of the Fall Line Freeway.

SR 49 Connector begins at an intersection with SR 96/SR 540 (Troutman Avenue), west of Fort Valley. It and SR 540 head northeast to an intersection with US 341/SR 7 (Hartley Road), northwest of the city. The highways curve to a due-east routing and curve to the southeast just before they meet SR 49 Conn.'s eastern terminus, an intersection with the SR 49 mainline (North Camellia Boulevard), northeast of the city. Here, SR 540 begins a concurrency with SR 49.

All of SR 49 Connector, from US 341/SR 7/SR 42 to the SR 49 mainline and SR 540, is included as part of the National Highway System, a system of roadways important to the nation's economy, defense, and mobility.

The entire route is in Peach County.

Location	mi	km	Destinations	Notes
	0.0	0.0	SR 96 / SR 540 west (Troutman Avenue) – Reynolds, Fort Valley	Western end of SR 540 concurrency; western terminus
	2.3	3.7	US 341 / SR 7 (Hartley Road)	
	4.7	7.6	SR 49 / SR 540 east (North Camellia Boulevard) – Fort Valley, Byron	Eastern end of SR 540 concurrency; eastern terminus
1.000 mi = 1.609 km; 1.000 km = 0.621 mi: Concurrency terminus

=== Oglethorpe truck route ===
State Route 49 Truck
- Location: Oglethorpe

State Route 49 Truck (SR 49 Truck) is a truck route that exists completely within the south-central part of Macon County.
