= Georgia State Route 128 =

State highway in Georgia, United States

State Route 128
- Georgia State Route 128 highlighted in red

Route information
- Maintained by GDOT
- Length: 35.1 mi (56.5 km)

Major junctions
- South end: SR 26 / SR 49 southwest of Oglethorpe
- SR 49 / SR 90 in Oglethorpe; SR 127 in northwestern Macon County; SR 96 / SR 540 in Reynolds
- North end: US 341 / SR 7 in Roberta

Location
- Country: United States
- State: Georgia
- Counties: Macon, Taylor, Crawford

Highway system
- Georgia State Highway System; Interstate; US; State; Special
| ← SR 127 | → US 129 |

State Route 128 (SR 128) is a 35.1-mile-long (56.5 km) state highway that runs south-to-north (with two diagonal sections) through portions of Macon, Taylor, and Crawford counties in the west-central part of the U.S. state of Georgia.

== Route description ==
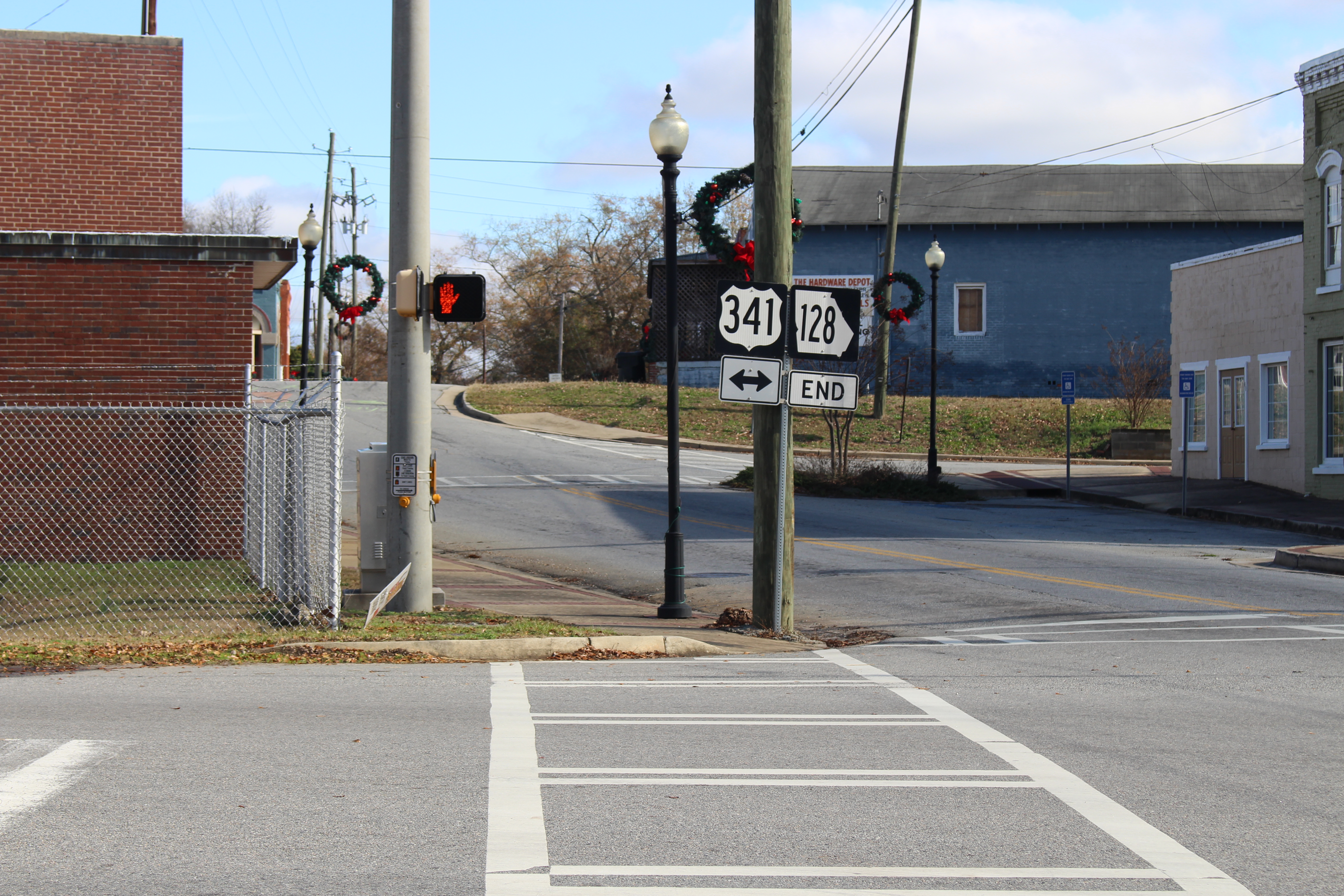
Northern terminus in Roberta

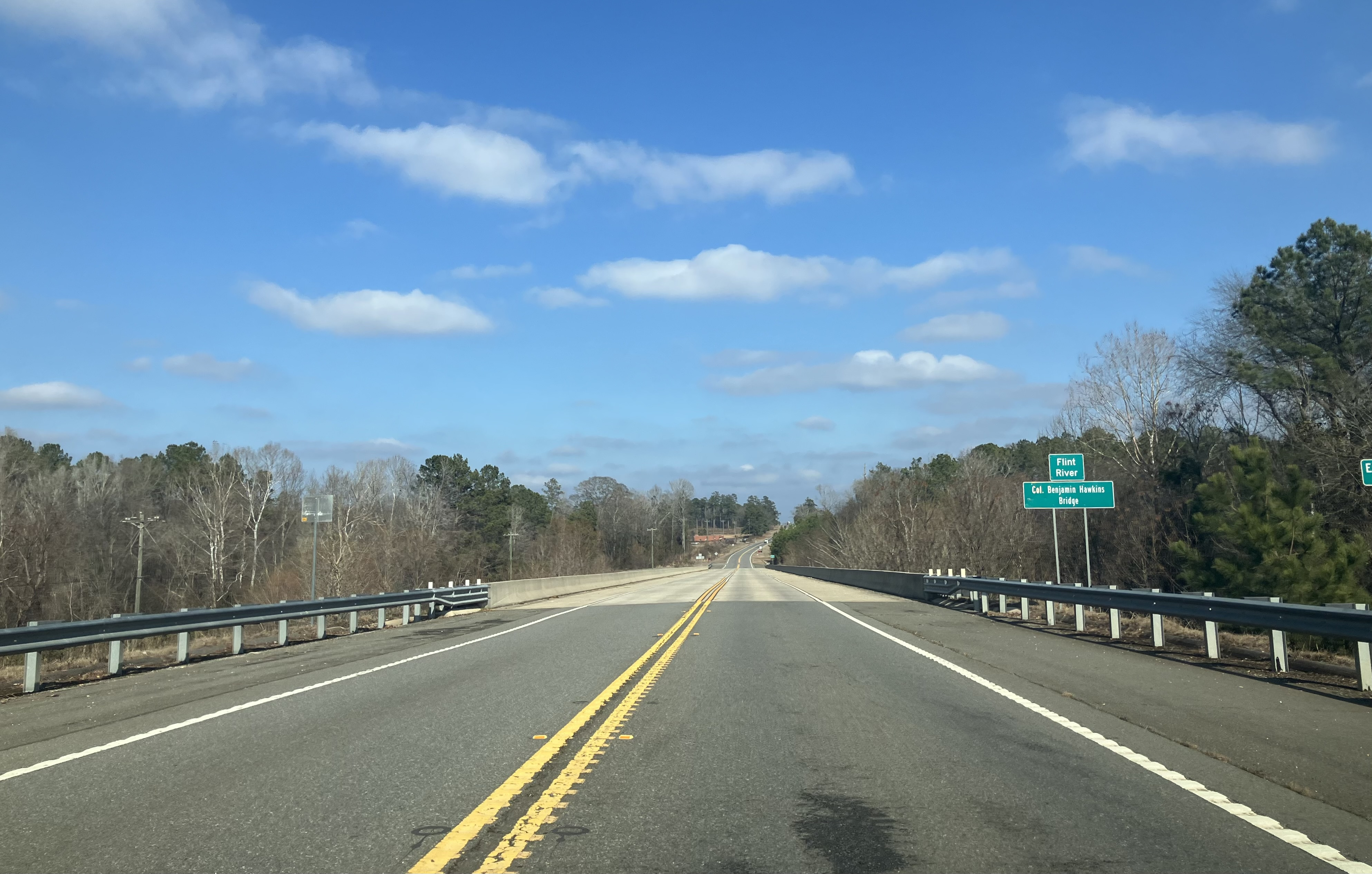
The Colonel Benjamin Hawkins Bridge carries SR 128 over the Flint River and across the Taylor–Crawford county line near Roberta.

SR 128 begins at an intersection with SR 26/SR 49/SR 49 Truck, southwest of Oglethorpe, in Macon County. SR 49/SR 128 head concurrently to the northeast, intersecting SR 128 Bypass, past Oglethorpe Cemetery, and to an intersection with SR 90. At this intersection, SR 49 north turns onto SR 90 east (Chatham Street), while SR 90 west/SR 128 north turn northwest. Just prior to leaving town is a second intersection with SR 128 Bypass. A little ways north of town, the two highways split, and SR 128 passes through part of Whitewater State Park. The road passes through rural areas of the county, and has a short concurrency with SR 127. Then, it crosses into Taylor County, and passes through Reynolds. In town is an intersection with SR 96/SR 540 (Marion Street). Just before leaving the county, it meets the eastern terminus of SR 137. Shortly to the northeast is the Benjamin Hawkins Bridge over the Flint River, which marks the Taylor–Crawford county line. SR 128 heads northeast into Roberta, where it meets its northern terminus, an intersection with US 341/SR 7 (South Dugger Avenue).

SR 128 is not part of the National Highway System, a system of roadways important to the nation's economy, defense, and mobility.

== Major intersections ==
| County | Location | mi | km | Destinations | Notes |
|---|---|---|---|---|---|
| Macon | | 0.0 | 0.0 | SR 26 / SR 49 south / SR 49 Truck north | Southern terminus of SR 49 Truck & SR 128; southern end of SR 49 concurrency |
| Macon | | 1.1 | 1.8 | SR 128 Byp. north (West Bypass) | Southern terminus of SR 128 Bypass |
| Macon | Oglethorpe | 2.1 | 3.4 | SR 49 north / SR 90 east (Chatham Street) | Northern end of SR 49 concurrency; southern end of SR 90 concurrency |
| Macon | Oglethorpe | 3.0 | 4.8 | SR 128 Byp. south (West Bypass) | Northern terminus of SR 128 Bypsss |
| Macon | | 3.8 | 6.1 | SR 90 west – Ideal | Northern end of SR 90 concurrency |
| Macon | | 11.9 | 19.2 | SR 127 east | Southern end of SR 127 concurrency |
| Macon | | 12.4 | 20.0 | SR 127 west – Rupert | Northern end of SR 127 concurrency |
| Taylor | Reynolds | 18.4 | 29.6 | Tommy Purvis Jr. Road | Former northern terminus of SR 195 |
| Taylor | Reynolds | 20.9 | 33.6 | SR 96 (Marion Street) / SR 540 – Butler, Fort Valley, Columbus | |
| Taylor | | 28.6 | 46.0 | SR 137 west – Butler | Eastern terminus of SR 137 |
| Flint River | | 28.9 | 46.5 | Benjamin Hawkins Bridge over the Flint River, marking the Taylor–Crawford county line | |
| Crawford | Roberta | 35.1 | 56.5 | US 341 (SR 7 / South Dugger Avenue) – Fort Valley, Barnesville | Northern terminus |
1.000 mi = 1.609 km; 1.000 km = 0.621 mi: Concurrency terminus

== Bannered route ==
State Route 128 Bypass
- Location: Bypass around Oglethorpe
- Length: 1.9 mi (3.1 km)

State Route 128 Bypass (SR 128 Byp.) is a 1.9-mile-long (3.1 km) bypass route that exists entirely within the south central part of Macon County, along the western edge of Oglethorpe.

It begins just southwest of Oglethorpe, at an intersection with the SR 128 mainline (Chatham Street). It briefly passes through a corner of the town, and curves to the northwest, meeting Jake Smith Road/West Cuyler Street. The road continues to curve to the northeast and re-enters the town. SR 128 Byp. continues to the northeast to Coogle Road/Reynolds Street. It intersects Smith Road and Tookes Drive, before it meets its northern terminus, a second intersection with the SR 128 mainline (North Randolph Street). At its southern end, it is signed as "SR 128 Truck Bypass"; while at its northern end, it is signed as "SR 128 Truck Route".

SR 128 Bypass is not part of the National Highway System, a system of roadways important to the nation's economy, defense, and mobility.

The entire route is in Macon County.

| Location | mi | km | Destinations | Notes |
|---|---|---|---|---|
| | 0.0 | 0.0 | SR 128 (Chatham Street) – Oglethorpe | Southern terminus |
| Oglethorpe | 1.9 | 3.1 | SR 90 / SR 128 (North Randolph Street) | Northern terminus |
1.000 mi = 1.609 km; 1.000 km = 0.621 mi
