= Georgia State Route 7 =

State highway in Georgia

State Route 7

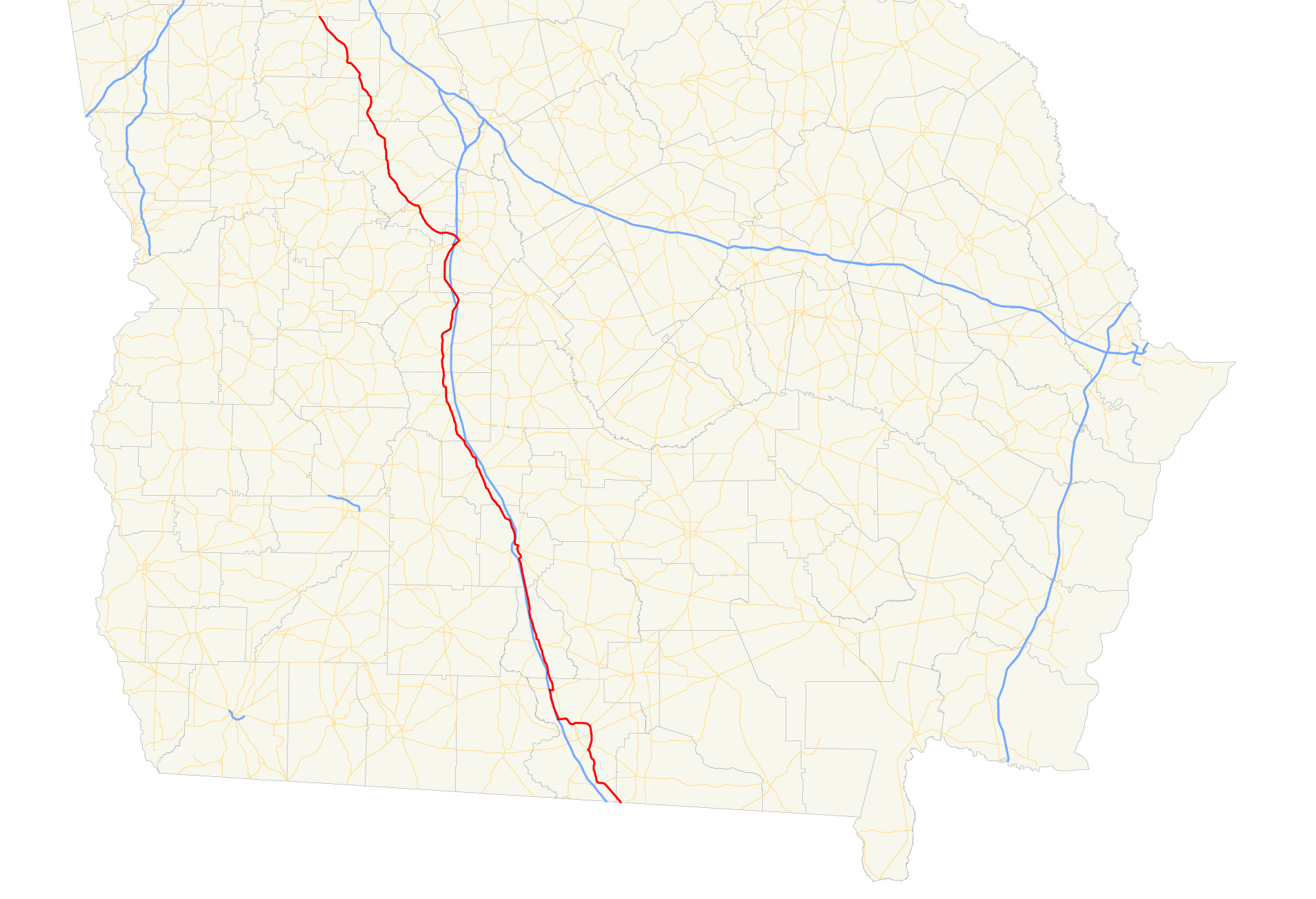

Route information
- Maintained by GDOT
- Length: 216.0 mi (347.6 km)
- Existed: 1919–present

Major junctions
- South end: US 41 / SR 25 at the Florida state line southeast of Lake Park
- US 84 / US 221 / SR 31 / SR 38 in Valdosta; I-75 (in Various Locations); SR 122 in Hahira; US 82 / US 319 / SR 520 in Tifton; SR 230 in Unadilla; SR 127 / SR 224 in Perry; US 41 / US 341 / SR 127 in Perry; US 41 / US 341 / SR 18 southeast of Barnesville
- North end: US 19 / US 41 / SR 3 / US 19 Bus. / US 41 Bus. / SR 155 south of Griffin

Location
- Country: United States
- State: Georgia
- Counties: Echols, Lowndes, Cook, Tift, Turner, Crisp, Dooly, Houston, Peach, Crawford, Monroe, Lamar, Pike, Spalding

Highway system
- Georgia State Highway System; Interstate; US; State; Special
← SR 6	→ SR 7W

State Route 7 (SR 7) is a 216.0-mile-long (347.6 km) state highway that travels in a southeast-to-northwest orientation through portions of Lowndes, Cook, Tift, Turner, Crisp, Dooly, Houston, Peach, Crawford, Monroe, Lamar, Pike, and Spalding counties in the southern and central parts of the U.S. state of Georgia. The highway connects the Florida state line southeast of Lake Park to the Griffin area, via Valdosta, Tifton, Cordele, Perry, and Barnesville. The highway is concurrent with either US 41 or US 341 for nearly its entire length, and closely parallels I-75 for much of its length.

SR 7 was established at least as early as 1919 along nearly the same path it travels today. US 41/SR 7 was designated on a concurrency with I-75 northwest of Valdosta to Hahira in 1982. US 41/SR 7 were re-routed onto an eastern bypass of Valdosta in 2006.

== Route description ==
=== Echols and Lowndes counties ===
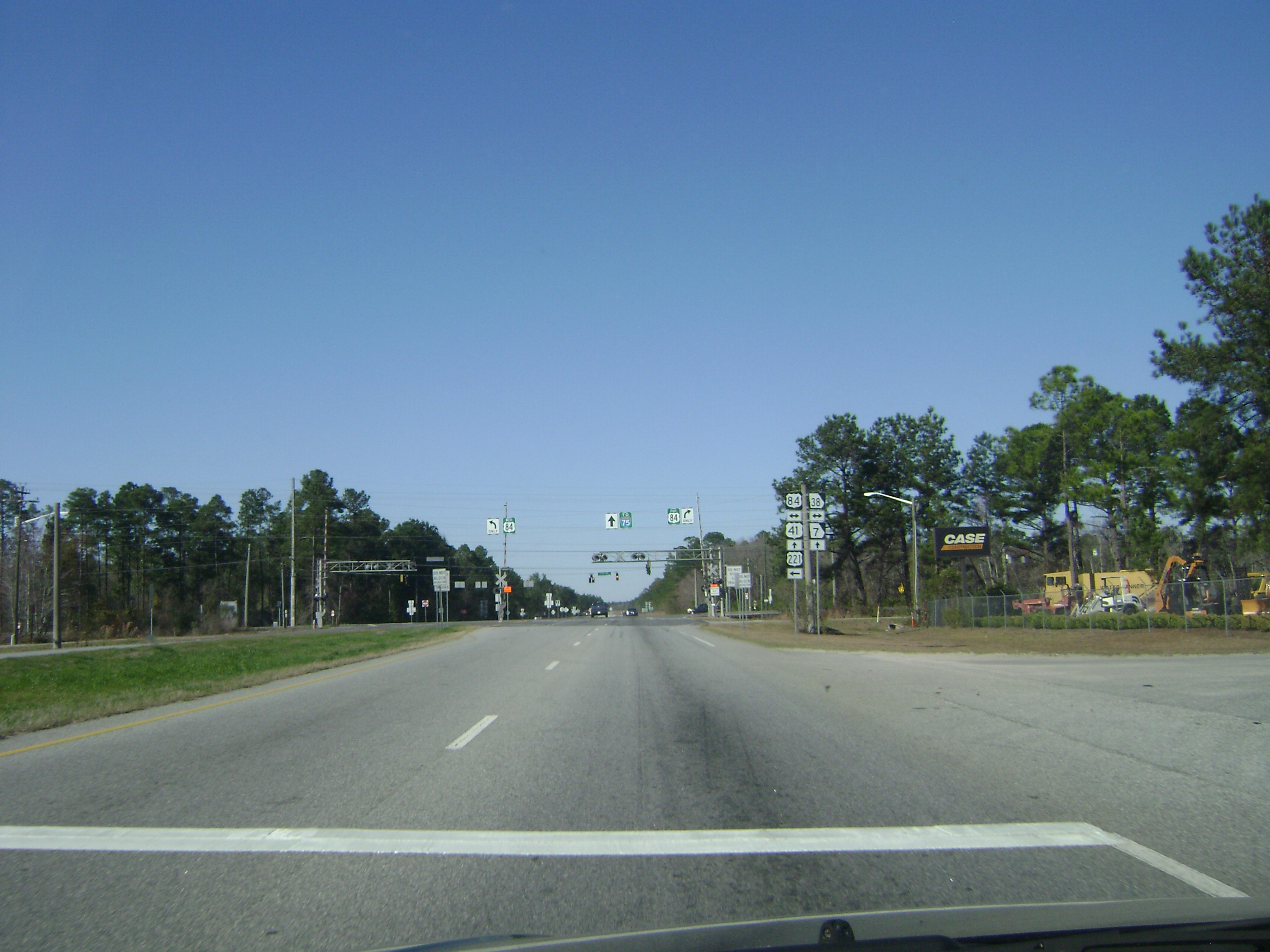
Intersection of US 41/US 221/SR 7/SR 31 with US 84/SR 38 on the east side of Valdosta.

SR 7 begins at the Florida state line, southeast of Lake Park. Here, the roadway continues as US 41/State Road 25 (Plum Street). US 41/SR 7 travels to the northwest, within Echols County, paralleling a Norfolk Southern Railway. Less than 1 mile (1.6 km) later, they enter Lowndes County. The two highways enter Lake Park, where they have a concurrency with SR 376. During the concurrency, the three highways travel north of Clayton Lake and the Francis Lake Golf Course. After the concurrency ends, US 41/SR 7 travels northeast of Horselot Lake and to the east of the Twin Lakes. After traveling through Dasher, they have an intersection with the southern terminus of US 41 Bus./SR 7 Bus. (South Patterson Street). This intersection also marks the southern end of a concurrency with SR 31. US 41/SR 7/SR 31 travels to the north-northeast on Inner Perimeter Road on what is essentially a bypass of the main part of Valdosta. They intersect SR 94 (New Statenville Highway). They curve to a northerly direction and enter the eastern part of the city. After curving to the north-northwest, they intersect US 84/US 221/SR 38 (East Hill Avenue). Here, US 221 joins the concurrency. The four highways travel to the north-northwest and curve to the northwest just before reaching East Park Avenue. Here, US 221/SR 31 departs the concurrency. US 41/SR 7 curves to the west and intersects SR 125 (Bemiss Road). Just northwest of Five Points Shopping Center, they intersect the northern terminus of US 41 Bus./SR 7 Bus. (North Ashley Street). The two highways travel between Valdosta Country Club and Langdale Park. On the northern edge of the park, they cross over the Withlacoochee River. They curve to the west-southwest to an interchange with Interstate 75 (I-75), with which they begin a concurrency to the north-northwest. I-75/US 41/SR 7 passes by Stone Creek Golf Club. The three highways enter Hahira, where they have an interchange with SR 122. At this interchange, US 41/SR 7 departs from I-75 and travel concurrent with SR 122 into the main part of town and depart by turning north-northwest onto Church Street. Then, the concurrency enters Cook County.

=== Cook, Tift, and Turner counties ===
US 41/SR 7 travels through the town of Cecil and then enters Adel. There, they intersect SR 37/SR 76 (4th Street). Immediately after leaving the city, they travel through Sparks. After Lenox, the two highways enter Tift County. On the southwestern edge of Henry Tift Myers Airport, they begin a concurrency with SR 125. The three highways travel along the southeastern edge of Unionville, before entering Unionville proper for less than 1,500 feet (460 m). When they leave Unionville, they immediately enter Tifton. In the main part of town, they intersect US 82/US 319/SR 35/SR 520 (5th Street). Just to the west-northwest of Fulwood Park, SR 125 splits off to the east-southeast, while US 41/SR 7 continues to the west-northwest and curve to the north-northwest to an interchange with I-75. After traveling through Chula, and passing southwest of the Golf Club of South Georgia, they enter Turner County. In Sycamore, they intersect SR 32 (Jefferson Davis Highway), which joins the concurrency. The three highways pass Turner County Airport to its west and enter Ashburn. In the main part of town, they intersect SR 112. At this intersection, SR 32 departs the concurrency to the southwest. About three blocks later, US 41/SR 7 intersects the southern terminus of SR 159 (North Street). After traveling through rural areas of the county, they enter Crisp County.

=== Crisp, Dooly, and Houston counties ===
After traveling through Arabi, US 41/SR 7 continues toward Cordele. They intersect SR 33 Conn. (Rockhouse Road East). After intersecting the northern terminus of SR 33, they intersect SR 300 (Georgia–Florida Parkway). The two highways then enter Cordele, where they intersect US 280/SR 30/SR 90 (16th Avenue). At this intersection, SR 90 joins the concurrency. After traveling on the west side of both Crisp Regional Hospital and the Crisp County-Cordele Airport, the three highways leave the city to the north and enter Dooly County. They enter Vienna, where they intersect SR 27 (Union Street). At this intersection, SR 90 departs the concurrency to the west-northwest, while US 41/SR 7 continues to the north. Just before leaving the city, they pass Vienna City Cemetery. They travel through Pinehurst and enter Unadilla. There, they have another interchange with I-75 in the southwestern part of the city. In downtown, they have a one-block concurrency with SR 230. Then, they enter Houston County. Approximately 0.5 miles (0.80 km) northwest of the county line, the two highways cross under, but don't have an interchange with, I-75. In Henderson, they intersect SR 26. After traveling on the west side of the Flat Creek Public Fishing Area, they enter Perry. In the city, they intersect Perry Parkway. Then, they curve along the western side of I-75 for approximately 1,000 feet (300 m), where they curve slightly to the northwest and intersect SR 127/SR 224 (Marshallville Road). The four highways travel to the east and immediately have an interchange with I-75. They curve to the southeast on Golden Isles Parkway, before US 41/SR 7/SR 127 departs to the northeast on General Courtney Hodges Boulevard. This is at an intersection with the northern terminus of SR 7 Spur, which is a former section of US 41/SR 7. The three highways travel to the southeast of Creekwood Park and just north of Evergreen Cemetery. After rounding a slight curve, they intersect SR 11 Bus. At this intersection, SR 7 departs to the north-northwest, while US 41/SR 11 Bus./SR 127 continues to the east-northeast. SR 7 gradually takes more of a northwesterly routing and has an interchange with I-75, it then curves to the west-northwest to intersect US 341/SR 11 Conn. (Perry Parkway). US 341 joins SR 7 at Perry Parkway and continue west to depart Perry, approximately 1 mile (1.6 km) later, they enter Peach County.

=== Peach, Crawford, and Monroe counties ===
US 341/SR 7 travels to the northwest through rural parts of the county and enter Fort Valley. In the main part of the city, they turn to the northeast and intersect the western terminus of SR 7 Conn. (East Church Street). They curve to a due-north routing and intersect SR 96, which joins the concurrency. Approximately 500 feet (150 m) later, they begin a curve to the west and intersect SR 49 (North Camellia Boulevard). Immediately afterward, US 341/SR 7 turns back to the north, while SR 96 travels to the west. The concurrent routes curve to the north-northwest, then to the west, and to the northwest before intersecting SR 49 Conn./SR 540 (Fall Line Freeway). Approximately 1 mile (1.6 km) later, they enter Crawford County. After traveling through rural portions of the county, the concurrency curves to a nearly due-north routing and enters Roberta. In town, they intersect the northern terminus of SR 128 (West Agency Street). Two blocks later, they intersect US 80/SR 22/SR 42 (Crusselle Street). At this intersection, SR 42 joins the concurrency. The three highways curve to the northwest into Musella, where SR 42 departs the concurrency. US 341/SR 7 continues on a nearly northwestern routing and enters Monroe County. They cut through the northeastern corner of Culloden. Just north-northeast of town, they curve to the north-northeast and intersect SR 74. Southwest of Strouds, they intersect the southern terminus of SR 83. The two highways curve back to the northwest and enter Lamar County.

=== Lamar, Pike, and Spalding counties ===
US 341/SR 7 travels along the western edge of Deer Trail Country Club and continue to the north-northwest. Just southeast of Barnesville, they intersect with US 41/SR 18 (Martin Luther King Jr. Parkway). At this intersection, US 341 reaches its northern terminus, and US 41/SR 7/SR 18 travels concurrent to the northwest. Almost immediately, they enter the city limits of Barnesville. At Thomaston Street, SR 36 joins the concurrency. The four highways cross over a Norfolk Southern Railway line and curve to the north-northeast. SR 18 departs the concurrency on Burnette Road. The concurrency crosses over another Norfolk Southern Railway line and curve to the north-northwest. They have an incomplete interchange with Aldora, Zebulon, and Elm Streets. The exit is only available for the southbound lanes and is only marked as leading to Aldora. Just northwest of Barnesville, SR 36 departs the concurrency. US 41/SR 7 curves to the northwest and crosses over a Norfolk Southern Railway before crossing the northeastern corner of Pike County. Approximately 3,000 feet (910 m) after entering Spalding County, they intersect US 19/SR 3 south of Griffin. This intersection is the northern terminus of SR 7; it also marks the southern terminus of US 19 Bus./US 41 Bus./SR 155 (Zebulon Road).

=== National Highway System ===
The following portions of SR 7 are part of the National Highway System, a system of roadways important to the nation's economy, defense, and mobility:

- From the southern end of the SR 31 concurrency, southeast of Valdosta, to the northern end of the I-75 concurrency, in Hahira
- The entire length of the SR 125 concurrency, from southeast of Unionville to Tifton.
- The entire length of the SR 32 concurrency, from Sycamore to Ashburn
- From the interchange with SR 300, south of Cordele, to an indeterminate point north-northwest of the city.
- From the northern end of the SR 224 concurrency (on US 41/SR 127) to the second I-75 interchange (on US 341) in Perry
- A brief portion in Fort Valley

== History ==
=== 1920s ===
SR 7 was established at least as early as 1919 on what is essentially its current path from the Florida state line southwest of Statenville to Griffin. Between the end of 1921 and the end of 1926, US 41 was designated on SR 7 between the Florida state line and Perry; it was also designated on the Barnesville–Griffin segment. Five segments of SR 7 had a "completed hard surface": north-northwest of Valdosta, north-northwest of Adel, from the Cook–Tift county line to a point south-southeast of Tifton, north-northwest of Tifton, and the Barnesville–Griffin segment. Three segments had a "completed semi hard surface": from Florida to Valdosta, from north-northwest of Valdosta to Adel, and the Crisp County portion of the Cordele–Vienna segment. Two segments had a "sand clay or top soil" surface: from the Crisp–Dooly county line to the approximate location of Pinehurst and the entire Monroe County portion. Two segments were under construction: a portion in the south-southeast part of Tifton and from the approximate location of Arabi to Cordele. By the end of 1929, two segments had a completed hard surface: from Florida to Perry and a portion in the southeast part of Fort Valley. A very small portion from just south of the Crawford–Monroe county line had a sand clay or top soil surface.

=== 1930s ===
In the second half of 1930, two segments had a sand clay or top soil surface: from Fort Valley to northwest of the Peach–Crawford county line and from just south of the Crawford–Monroe county line to the Monroe–Lamar county line. Two segments were under construction: from the Florida state line to just northwest of the Echols–Lowndes county line and the Peach County portion of the Perry–Fort Valley segment. By the end of 1931, all of the highway from the Florida state line to just northwest of the Peach–Crawford county line, as well as the entire Monroe County segment had a completed hard surface. In February 1932, the entire Crawford County portion had a sand clay or top soil surface. By the middle of 1933, both the Crawford and Lamar county portions of the Roberta–Barnesville segment were under construction. In May, the Lamar county portion had completed grading, but was not surfaced. By the end of 1935, nearly the entire Crawford County portion had a completed hard surface. In the first half of 1936, the Roberta–Griffin segment was also completed. In the second quarter of 1937, the entire highway was completed. By October, US 41's path from Perry to Barnesville, via Macon, was shifted west onto SR 7. By the end of the year, US 41 was reverted to its former path. Between February 1948 and April 1949, US 341 was designated on the Perry–Barnesville segment of SR 7.

=== 1960s to 2000s ===
Between June 1963 and the end of 1965, SR 333 was proposed to be extended on a path that functioned like a bypass. This extension was planned to extend south from the western part of Griffin, then south and southeast to US 41/SR 7 at Milner, then south-southeast and south-southwest to Aldora, and finally east-southeast to just south of Barnesville. In 1967, US 341/SR 7 in the Barnesville area was shifted southwest onto the southern part of this planned extension's path, along with SR 333. The former path of SR 7 northwest of Barnesville, on US 41, was redesignated as SR 7 Conn., while the rest of it was under construction. The next year, SR 333 was extended on its planned path through Milner to US 19/SR 3 south-southwest of Griffin. In 1969, SR 333 was extended on US 19/US 41 to the southern part of Griffin. SR 7 was extended northwest to US 19/US 41/SR 3/SR 333, at the southern terminus of US 19 Bus./US 41 Bus. In 1970, SR 333 was truncated out of the Griffin area. SR 7 was extended on US 19/US 41 from south-southwest of Griffin to northwest of Lovejoy. In 1981, SR 7 between a point north-northwest of Valdosta to Hahira was shifted west onto I-75 and SR 122, replacing SR 7 Conn. The next year, US 41 was also shifted westward on this same path. In 1986, the northern terminus was reverted to its current point. In 2006, US 41/SR 7 was shifted out of downtown Valdosta, onto Inner Perimeter Road. The former path was redesignated as US 41 Bus./SR 7 Bus. The next year, US 41/SR 18 in the eastern part of Barnesville was rerouted on an eastern bypass of the city, which truncated US 341/SR 7 to the current northern terminus.

== Major intersections ==
County	Location	mi	km	Destinations	Notes
Florida state line		0.0	0.0	Southern terminus; southern end of US 41 concurrency; roadway continues as US 41 south/SR 25 south – Jennings.	
Echols	No major junctions				
Lowndes	Lake Park	5.5	8.9	SR 376 east (North East Street) – Statenville	Southern end of SR 376 concurrency
Lowndes	Lake Park	6.8	10.9	SR 376 west (Lakes Boulevard) – Clyattville	Northern end of SR 376 concurrency
Lowndes		15.1	24.3	US 41 Bus. north / SR 7 Bus. north (South Patterson Street)	Southern terminus of US 41 Bus./SR 7 Bus.
Lowndes		15.2	24.5	SR 31 south (Inner Perimeter Road) – Clyattville	Southern end of SR 31 concurrency
Lowndes		16.4	26.4	SR 94 (New Statenville Highway) – Valdosta, Statenville	
Lowndes	Valdosta	19.1	30.7	US 84 / US 221 south / SR 38 (East Hill Avenue)	Southern end of US 221 concurrency
Lowndes	Valdosta	21.0	33.8	US 221 north / SR 31 north (East Park Avenue)	Northern end of US 221 and SR 31 concurrencies
Lowndes	Valdosta	23.3	37.5	SR 125 (Bemiss Road) – Ray City	
Lowndes	Valdosta	24.8	39.9	US 41 Bus. south / SR 7 Bus. south (North Valdosta Road)	Northern terminus of US 41 Bus./SR 7 Bus.
Lowndes		29.0	46.7	I-75 south (SR 401) – Lake City	I-75 exit 22; southern end of I-75 concurrency
Lowndes	Hahira	35.6	57.3	I-75 north (SR 401) – Macon	I-75 exit 29; northern end of I-75 concurrency
Lowndes	Hahira	35.8	57.6	SR 122 west – Barney	Southern end of SR 122 concurrency
Lowndes	Hahira	36.7	59.1	SR 122 east (East Main Street) – Lakeland	Northern end of SR 122 concurrency
Cook	Adel	47.4	76.3	SR 37 / SR 76 (East 4th Street) – Moultrie, Barney, Ray City, Nashville	
Tift		68.2	109.8	SR 125 south – Nashville	Southern end of SR 125 concurrency
Tift	Tifton	70.2	113.0	US 82 / US 319 / SR 35 / SR 520 (East 5th Street) – Sylvester, Moultrie, Willacoochee, Ocilla	
Tift	Tifton	71.1	114.4	SR 125 north (East 12th Street) – Fitzgerald	Northern end of SR 125 concurrency
Tift	Tifton	72.6	116.8	I-75 (SR 401) – Valdosta, Macon	I-75 exit 64
Turner	Sycamore	87.8	141.3	SR 32 Conn. east to SR 32	Western terminus of SR 32 Conn.
Turner	Sycamore	87.9	141.5	SR 32 east (Jefferson Davis Highway) – Ocilla	Southern end of SR 32 concurrency
Turner	Ashburn	90.9	146.3	SR 32 west / SR 112 (Washington Avenue) – Leesburg, Sylvester, Rebecca	Northern end of SR 32 concurrency
Turner	Ashburn	91.1	146.6	SR 159 north (North Street) – Pitts	Southern terminus of SR 159
Crisp		107	172	SR 33 Conn. (Rockhouse Road East)	
Crisp		107.4	172.8	SR 33 south – Sylvester	Northern terminus of SR 33
Crisp		108.3	174.3	SR 300 (Georgia–Florida Parkway) – Albany	
Crisp	Cordele	111.3	179.1	US 280 / SR 30 / SR 90 east (16th Avenue) – Americus, Abbeville, Rebecca	Southern end of SR 90 concurrency
Dooly	Vienna	120.6	194.1	SR 27 / SR 90 west (Union Street) – Americus, Oglethorpe, Hawkinsville	Northern end of SR 90 concurrency
Dooly	Unadilla	132.7	213.6	I-75 (SR 401) – Valdosta, Macon	I-75 exit 121
Dooly	Unadilla	133.7	215.2	SR 230 west (2nd Street) – Byromville	Southern end of SR 230 concurrency
Dooly	Unadilla	133.8	215.3	SR 230 east (Borum Street) – Hawkinsville	Northern end of SR 230 concurrency
Houston	Henderson	140.3	225.8	SR 26 – Oglethorpe, Hawkinsville	
Houston	Perry	148.1	238.3	SR 127 west (Marshallville Road) / SR 224 west – Marshallville, Montezuma	Southern end of SR 127 and SR 224 concurrencies
Houston	Perry	148.4	238.8	SR 224 east (Golden Isles Parkway) / SR 7 Spur south (General Courtney Hodges Boulevard) – Hawkinsville, Georgia National Fairgrounds and Agricenter	Northern end of SR 224 concurrency; northern terminus of SR 7 Spur
Houston	Perry	149.8	241.1	US 41 north / SR 11 Bus. north / SR 127 east (Commerce Street) – Warner Robins, Kathleen, Hawkinsville, Unadilla	Northern end of US 41 and SR 127 concurrencies; southern terminus of SR 11 Bus.
Houston	Perry	150.8	242.7	I-75 (SR 401) – Valdosta, Macon	I-75 exit 136
Houston	Perry	152.6	245.6	US 341 south / SR 11 Conn. south	Southern end of US 341 concurrency; northern terminus SR 11 Conn.
Peach	Fort Valley	161.7	260.2	SR 7 Conn. east (East Church Street)	Western terminus of SR 7 Conn.
Peach	Fort Valley	161.9	260.6	SR 96 east – Warner Robins	Southern end of SR 96 concurrency
Peach	Fort Valley	162.0	260.7	SR 49 (North Camellia Boulevard) – Marshallville, Byron	
Peach	Fort Valley	162.0	260.7	SR 96 west (Vineville Street) – Reynolds	Northern end of SR 96 concurrency
Peach		164.2	264.3	SR 49 Conn. / SR 540 (Fall Line Freeway) – Reynolds, Byron, Butler	
Crawford	Roberta	176.4	283.9	SR 128 south (West Agency Street) – Reynolds	Northern terminus of SR 128
Crawford	Roberta	176.6	284.2	US 80 / SR 22 / SR 42 south (Cursselle Street) – Talbotton, Macon, Byron	Southern end of SR 42 concurrency
Crawford	Musella	182.2	293.2	SR 42 north – Forsyth	Northern end of SR 42 concurrency
Monroe		189.1	304.3	SR 74 – Thomaston, Macon	
Monroe		191.2	307.7	SR 83 north – Forsyth	Southern terminus of SR 82
Lamar		201.1	323.6	US 41 south / SR 18 east (Martin Luther King Jr. Parkway) / US 341 south	Northern terminus of US 341; northern end of US 341 concurrency; southern end of US 41 and SR 18 concurrencies
Lamar	Barnesville	202.4	325.7	SR 36 south – Thomaston	Southern end of SR 36 concurrency
Lamar	Barnesville	203.1	326.9	SR 18 west (Rose Avenue) – Aldora, Zebulon	Northern end of SR 18 concurrency
Lamar	Barnesville	203.9	328.1	Aldora Street / Zebulon Street / Elm Street	Interchange; southbound exit and northbound entrance
Pike	No major junctions				
Spalding		216.0	347.6	US 19 / US 41 north / SR 3 (Zebulon Road / Martin Luther King Jr. Parkway) / US 19 Bus. north / US 41 Bus. north / SR 155 north (Zebulon Road) – Zebulon, Griffin	Northern terminus of SR 7; southern terminus of US 19 Bus./US 41 Bus./SR 155; northern end of US 41 concurrency
1.000 mi = 1.609 km; 1.000 km = 0.621 mi: Concurrency terminus; Incomplete access

== Special routes ==
=== Valdosta business loop ===
State Route 7 Business
- Location: Valdosta
- Length: 7.0 mi (11.3 km)
- Existed: 2006–present

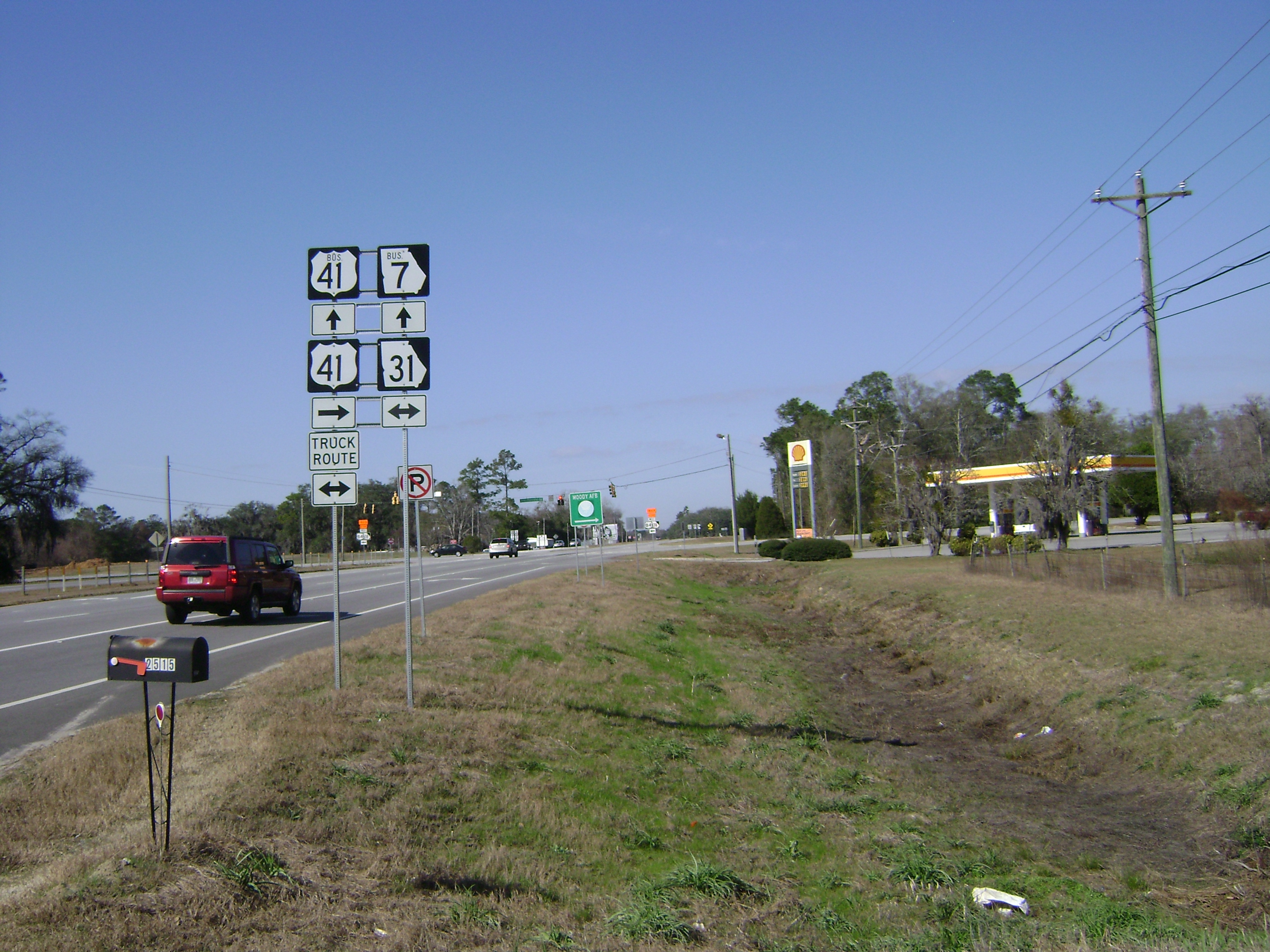
Southern terminus of US 41 Bus./SR 7 Bus. southeast of Valdosta

State Route 7 Business (SR 7 Bus.) is a 7.0-mile-long (11.3 km) business route of SR 7 that exists entirely within the west-central part of Lowndes County. Nearly the entire route travels within the city limits of Valdosta. It travels concurrent with US 41 Bus. for its entire length.

US 41 Bus./SR 7 Bus. begins just southeast of Valdosta's city limits, at an intersection with US 41/SR 7/SR 31 (Inner Perimeter Road). The business routes travel to the northwest on South Patterson Street and pass just to the southwest of Payton Park. A short distance later, they intersect the western terminus of SR 94 (Griffin Avenue). Just north of Olympic Park, the southbound and northbound lanes split onto one-way pairs. The southbound lanes continue on Patterson Street, and the northbound lanes travel on Ashley Street. They intersect US 84/US 221/SR 38, which also travel on one-way pairs. The southbound lanes intersect the southern terminus of SR 7 Alt. (North Patterson Street). At West Magnolia Street, the two directions travel together again. US 41 Bus./SR 7 Bus. travel nearly due north, just to the east of Valdosta State University, between Drexel Park and Vallotton Park. Just past East Park Avenue, they curve to the north-northwest and intersect the southern terminus of SR 125 (Bemiss Road). Slightly more than 400 feet (120 m) later, the two highways pass by South Georgia Medical Center and then Billy Grant Baseball Field. Next to the Five Points Shopping Center, they intersect the northern terminus of SR 7 Alt. (North Patterson Street). Then, they curve to the west-northwest and meet their northern terminus, another intersection with the US 41/SR 7 mainline.

All of SR 7 Bus. is included as part of the National Highway System, a system of roadways important to the nation's economy, defense, and mobility.

In 2006, US 41/SR 7 was shifted out of downtown Valdosta onto Inner Perimeter Road. Their former path was redesignated as US 41 Bus./SR 7 Bus.

The entire route is in Lowndes County.

Location	mi	km	Destinations	Notes
	0.0	0.0	US 41 / SR 7 / SR 31 (Inner Perimeter Road) / US 41 Bus. begins – Lake Park	Southern terminus of US 41 Bus./SR 7 Bus.; south end of US 41 Bus. concurrency
Valdosta	2.5	4.0	SR 94 (Griffin Avenue) – Statenville	Western terminus of SR 94
Valdosta	3.3	5.3	US 84 east / US 221 north / SR 38 east (Hill Avenue) – Stockton	Eastbound lanes of US 84/US 221/SR 38 on one-way pairs
Valdosta	3.4	5.5	US 84 west / US 221 south / SR 38 west (Central Avenue) – Quitman	Westbound lanes of US 84/US 221/SR 38 on one-way pairs
Valdosta	3.6	5.8	SR 7 Alt. north (North Patterson Street)	Southern terminus of SR 7 Alt.; no access from northbound US 41 Bus./SR 7 Bus. to SR 7 Alt. or vice versa
Valdosta	5.2	8.4	SR 125 north (Bemiss Road) – Moody Air Force Base	Southern terminus of SR 125
Valdosta	6.6	10.6	SR 7 Alt. south (North Patterson Street)	Northern terminus of SR 7 Alt.; no access from northbound US 41 Bus./SR 7 Bus. to SR 7 Alt. or vice versa
Valdosta	7.0	11.3	US 41 / SR 7 (Inner Perimeter Road/North Valdosta Road) / US 41 Bus. ends – Lake Park	Northern terminus of US 41 Bus./SR 7 Bus.; north end of US 41 Bus. concurrency
1.000 mi = 1.609 km; 1.000 km = 0.621 mi: Concurrency terminus; Incomplete access

=== Valdosta alternate route ===
State Route 7 Alternate
- Location: Valdosta
- Length: 2.8 mi (4.5 km)
- Existed: 1982–present

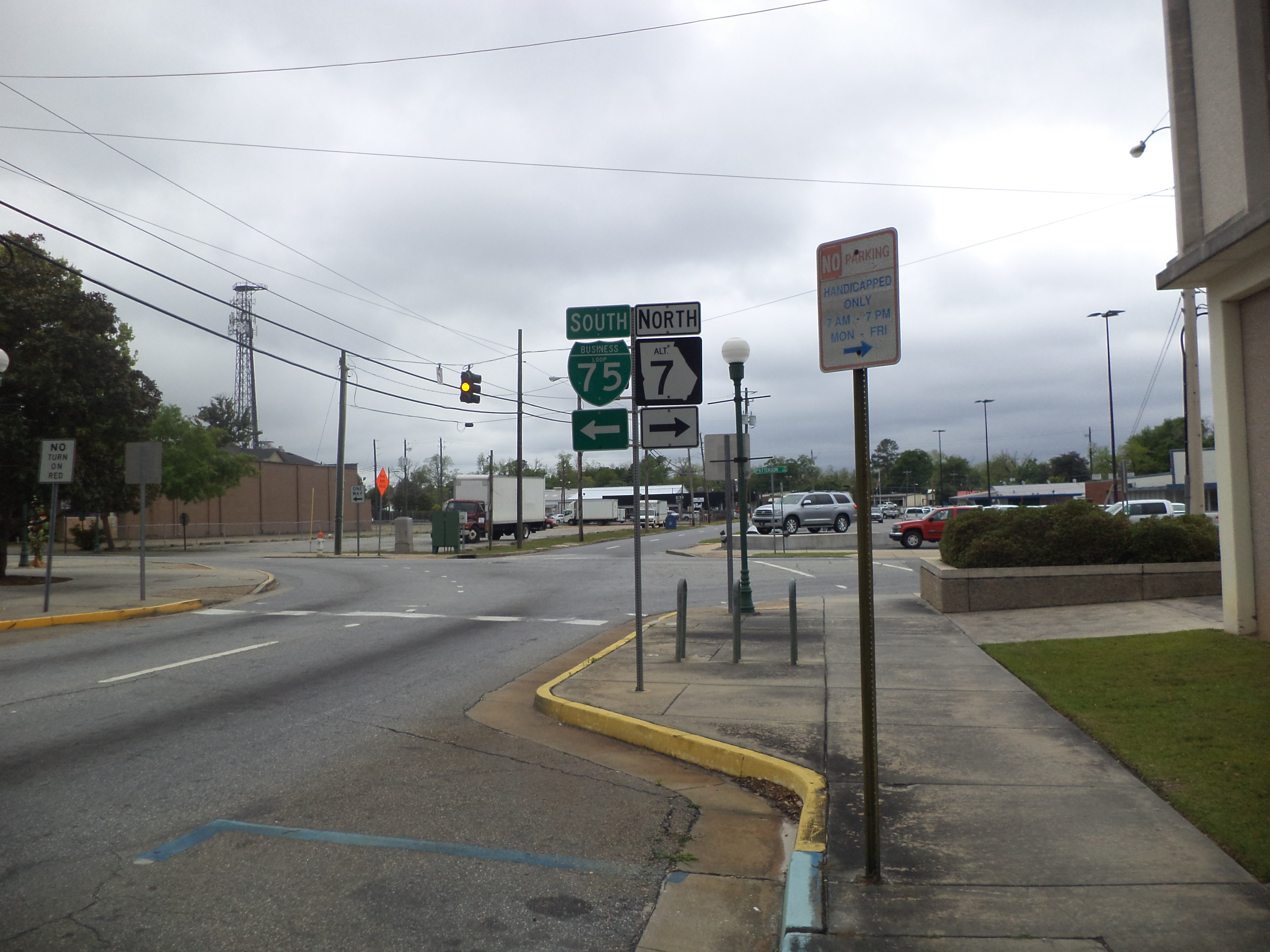
Southern terminus of SR 7 Alt. at North Patterson Street and West Magnolia Street

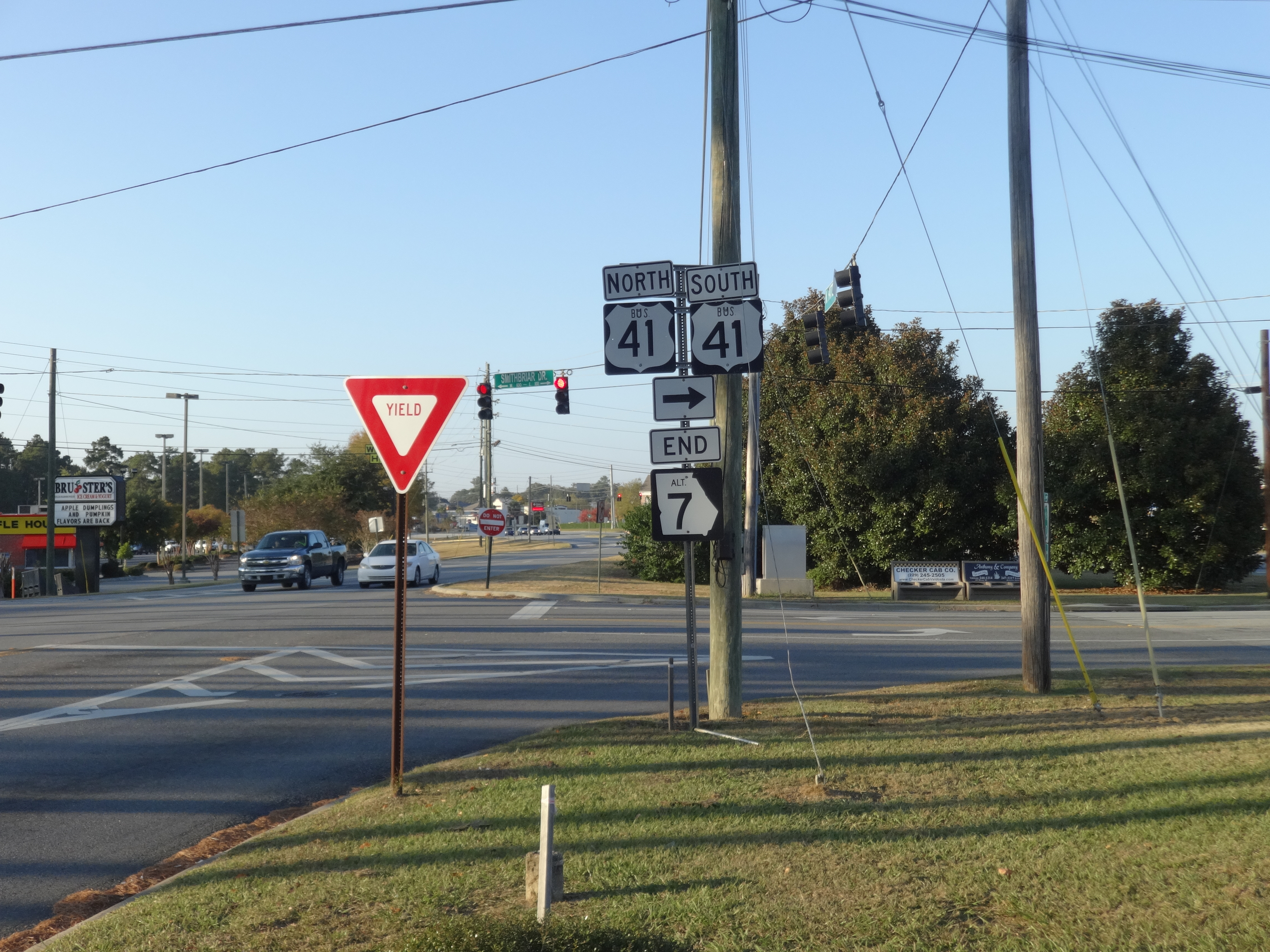
Northern terminus of SR 7 Alt. at North Patterson Street and Smithbriar Drive

State Route 7 Alternate (SR 7 Alt.) is a 2.8-mile-long (4.5 km) alternate route of SR 7 that exists entirely within the west-central part of Lowndes County and travels completely within the city limits of Valdosta.

SR 7 Alt. begins at an intersection with the southbound lanes of I-75 Bus./US 41 Bus./SR 7 Bus. in downtown Valdosta. It travels to the north-northwest and enters Valdosta State University. Within the university, the highway curves to a more due-north orientation and passes just to the west of Drexel Park. At East Park Avenue, the highway begins to travel due north. It then passes west of the South Georgia Medical Center. It curves to the north-northwest and travels to the east of McKey Park and Valdosta Middle School. Next to the Five Points Shopping Center, it meets its northern terminus, a second intersection with the southbound lanes of US 41 Bus./SR 7 Bus. There is an "end" sign at the corner of North Patterson Street and Smithbriar Drive (due to the roadway north of there being southbound only). Traffic on SR 7 Alt. heading to US 41 Bus./SR 7 Bus. is required to turn right onto Smithbriar Drive for one block.

The roadway that would eventually become SR 7 Alt, was established between the beginning of 1945 and November 1946 as SR 7 Spur. At this time, it extended from what is now US 41 Bus./SR 7 Bus. south of its current southern terminus along its current alignment. Between June 1960 and June 1963, SR 7 Spur was redesignated as SR 7 Loop. In 1982, SR 7 Loop was redesignated as SR 7 Alt.

The entire route is in Valdosta, Lowndes County.

mi	km	Destinations	Notes
0.0	0.0	I-75 BL south / US 41 Bus. south / SR 7 Bus. south (North Patterson Street/East Magnolia Street)	Southern terminus; no access to northbound US 41 Bus./SR 7 Bus. from SR 7 Alt. or vice versa
2.8	4.5	US 41 Bus. south / SR 7 Bus. south	Northern terminus; no access to northbound US 41 Bus./SR 7 Bus. from SR 7 Alt. or vice versa; traffic must turn right onto Smithbriar Drive (one block farther south) to access northbound US 41 Bus./SR 7 Bus.
1.000 mi = 1.609 km; 1.000 km = 0.621 mi: Incomplete access

=== Lowndes County connector route ===
State Route 7 Connector
- Location: Northwest of Valdosta
- Length: 1.3 mi (2.1 km)
- Existed: 1963–1981

State Route 7 Connector (SR 7 Conn.) was a 1.3-mile-long (2.1 km) connector route that existed entirely within the west-central part of Lowndes County and traveled northwest of Valdosta. It was established in between June 1960 and June 1963 from US 41/SR 7 north-northwest of Valdosta to Interstate 75 (I-75) northwest of the city. In 1981, SR 7 between Valdosta and Hahira was shifted westward onto I-75 and SR 122. This replaced SR 7 Conn. The next year, US 41 was also shifted onto this path.

The entire route is in Lowndes County.

Location	mi	km	Destinations	Notes
	0.0	0.0	US 41 / SR 7 – Valdosta, Hahira	Southern terminus
	1.3	2.1	I-75 (SR 401) – Lake City, Macon	Northern terminus
1.000 mi = 1.609 km; 1.000 km = 0.621 mi

=== Perry spur route ===
State Route 7 Spur
- Location: Perry
- Length: 0.3 mi (480 m)
- Existed: 1965–present

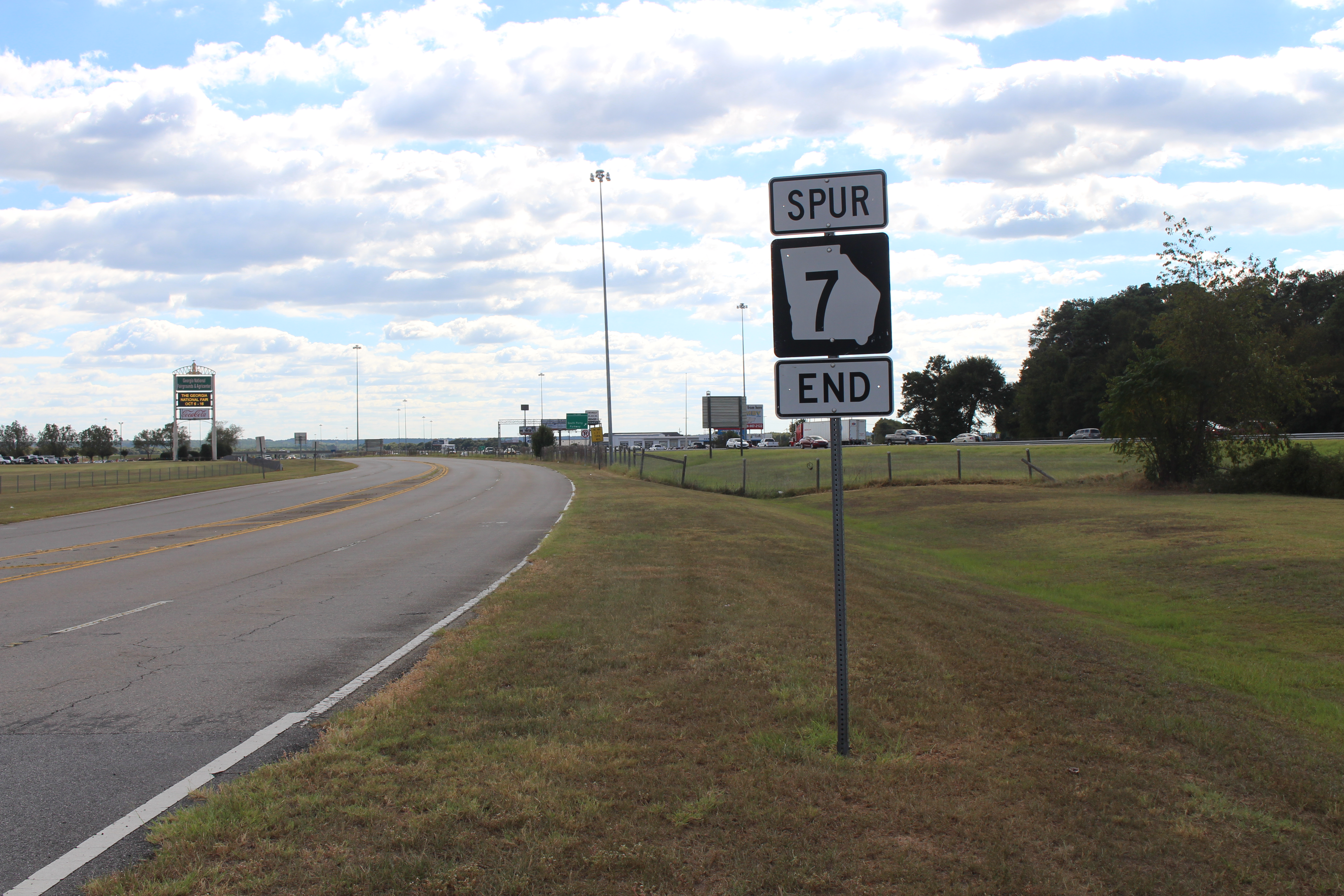
Southern terminus of SR 7 Spur in Perry

State Route 7 Spur (SR 7 Spur) is a 0.3-mile-long (0.48 km) spur route that exists entirely within the west-central part of Houston County and travels completely within the city limits of Perry. It is known locally as General Courtney Hodges Boulevard, after Courtney Hodges, the United States Army general that was born in Perry. It was formerly part of the routing of US 41/SR 7 before they were realigned through the city.

SR 7 Spur begins at a point of General Courtney Hodges Boulevard near where US 41/SR 7 formerly crossed over Interstate 75 (I-75) in the southern part of Perry. It travels to the northeast, passing the Perry Area Chamber of Commerce and the Perry Welcome Center, and meets its northern terminus, an intersection with US 41/SR 7/SR 127/SR 224 in the main part of the city.

Between June 1963 and the end of 1965, US 41/SR 7 in the southwestern part of Perry was shifted westward, presumably to give them an interchange with I-75. Part of the former path north-northeast of the Interstate was redesignated as SR 7 Spur. In 1966, US 341/SR 11 in the main part of the city was shifted slightly to the southwest. Their former path on Washington Avenue was redesignated as a northern segment of SR 7 Spur. It traveled from US 341/SR 11 (Spring Street) to US 41/US 341/SR 7/SR 11 (Carroll Street). In 1970, the southern segment was redesignated as SR 7 Conn. Between the beginning of 1975 and the beginning of 1983, SR 11's path through Perry was shifted slightly to the east, replacing what was the northern segment of SR 7 Spur. In 1989, SR 7 Conn. was reverted being designated as SR 7 Spur.

The entire route is in Perry, Houston County.

mi	km	Destinations	Notes
0.0	0.0	General Courtney Hodges Boulevard – Georgia National Fairgrounds and Agricenter	Southern terminus
0.3	0.48	US 41 / SR 7 / SR 127 (Golden Isles Parkway/General Courtney Hodges Boulevard) / SR 224 (Golden Isles Parkway) to I-75 – Warner Robins, Marshallville, Hawkinsville	Northern terminus
1.000 mi = 1.609 km; 1.000 km = 0.621 mi

=== Fort Valley connector route ===
State Route 7 Connector
- Location: Fort Valley
- Length: 0.2 mi (320 m)
- Existed: 1970–present

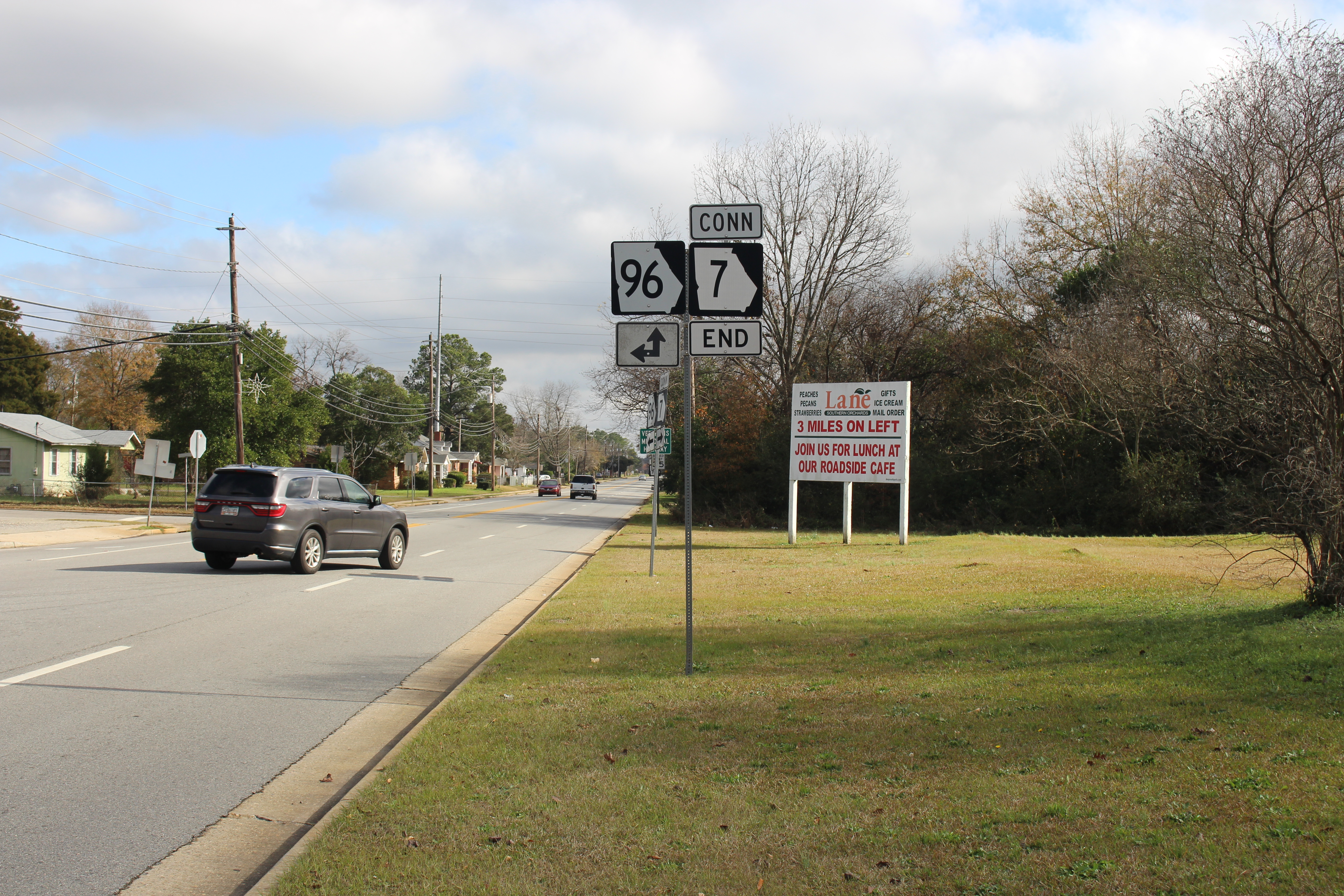
Eastern terminus of SR 7 Connector in Fort Valley

State Route 7 Connector (SR 7 Conn.) is a 0.2-mile-long (0.32 km) connector route of SR 7 that exists entirely within the west-central part of Peach County and travels completely within the city limits of Fort Valley. It is known locally as East Church Street.

SR 7 Conn. begins at an intersection with US 341/SR 7 (Oakland Heights Parkway) in the central part of Fort Valley. It travels due east to meet its eastern terminus, an intersection with SR 96 in the eastern part of the city.

In 1970, SR 7 Conn. was designated from US 341/SR 7 east of the city to SR 49 northeast of the city. In 1986, SR 96 was shifted eastward, truncating the easternmost part of the connector.

The entire route is in Fort Valley, Peach County.

mi	km	Destinations	Notes
0.0	0.0	US 341 / SR 7 (Oakland Heights Parkway) – Perry, Roberta	Western terminus
0.2	0.32	SR 96 – Reynolds, Warner Robins	Eastern terminus
1.000 mi = 1.609 km; 1.000 km = 0.621 mi

=== Barnesville connector route ===
State Route 7 Connector
- Location: Barnesville
- Existed: 1967–1985

State Route 7 Connector (SR 7 Conn.) was a connector route of SR 7 that existed in the northwestern part of Barnesville. Between June 1963 and the end of 1965, SR 333 was proposed to be extended on a path that functioned like a bypass. This extension was planned to extend south from the western part of Griffin, then south and southeast to US 41/SR 7 at Milner, then south-southeast and south-southwest to Aldora, and finally east-southeast to just south of Barnesville. In 1967, US 341/SR 7 in the Barnesville area was shifted southwest onto the southern part of this planned extension's path, along with SR 333. The former path of SR 7 northwest of Barnesville, on US 41, was redesignated as SR 7 Conn., while the rest of it was under construction. In 1985, SR 18 in the Barnesville area was rerouted to the northwest, replacing all of SR 7 Conn.

== See also ==
- Georgia State Route 7W
- Georgia State Route 7E
