= WFVS =

WFVS may refer to:

- WFVS-FM, a radio station (96.9 FM) licensed to serve Reynolds, Georgia, United States
- WFVS-LP, a defunct low-power radio station (104.3 FM) formerly licensed to serve Fort Valley, Georgia
