= Georgia State Route 159 =

State highway in Georgia, United States

State Route 159
- North Railroad Street, North Street
- SR 159 highlighted in red

Route information
- Maintained by GDOT
- Length: 18.9 mi (30.4 km)

Major junctions
- North end: US 280 / SR 30 in Pitts
- I-75 in Ashburn
- South end: US 41 / SR 7 in Ashburn

Location
- Country: United States
- State: Georgia
- Counties: Turner, Wilcox

Highway system
- Georgia State Highway System; Interstate; US; State; Special
← SR 158	→ SR 160

State Route 159 (SR 159) is a south–north state highway in the south-central part of the U.S. state of Georgia. Its routing is in portions of Turner and Wilcox counties.

== Route description ==
SR 164 begins at an intersection with US 41/SR 7 in Ashburn It has an interchange with Interstate 75 (I-75) just before leaving town. It heads northeast until it meets a concurrency with SR 90. It heads north to the town of Pitts, where it meets its northern terminus, an intersection with US 280/SR 30.

== Major intersections ==
County	Location	mi	km	Destinations	Notes
Turner	Ashburn	0.0	0.0	US 41 / SR 7	Southern terminus
Turner	Ashburn	1.8	2.9	I-75 (SR 401) – Valdosta, Macon	I-75 exit 84
Turner		10.1	16.3	SR 90 east (North Railroad Street) – Rebecca	Southern end of SR 90 concurrency
Turner–Wilcox county line		12.2	19.6	SR 90 west – Cordele	Northern end of SR 90 concurrency
Wilcox	Pitts	18.9	30.4	US 280 / SR 30 (7th Avenue West)	Northern terminus
1.000 mi = 1.609 km; 1.000 km = 0.621 mi: Concurrency terminus
