= Charing, Georgia =

Unincorporated community in Georgia, U.S.

Coordinates: 32°27′42″N 84°21′42″W

Charing is an unincorporated community in Taylor County, in the U.S. state of Georgia.

== History ==
A post office called Charing was established in 1909, and remained in operation until 1975. The Georgia General Assembly incorporated the place as the "Town of Charing" in 1912. The town's charter was officially dissolved in 1915.
