= Junction City, Georgia =

- Town
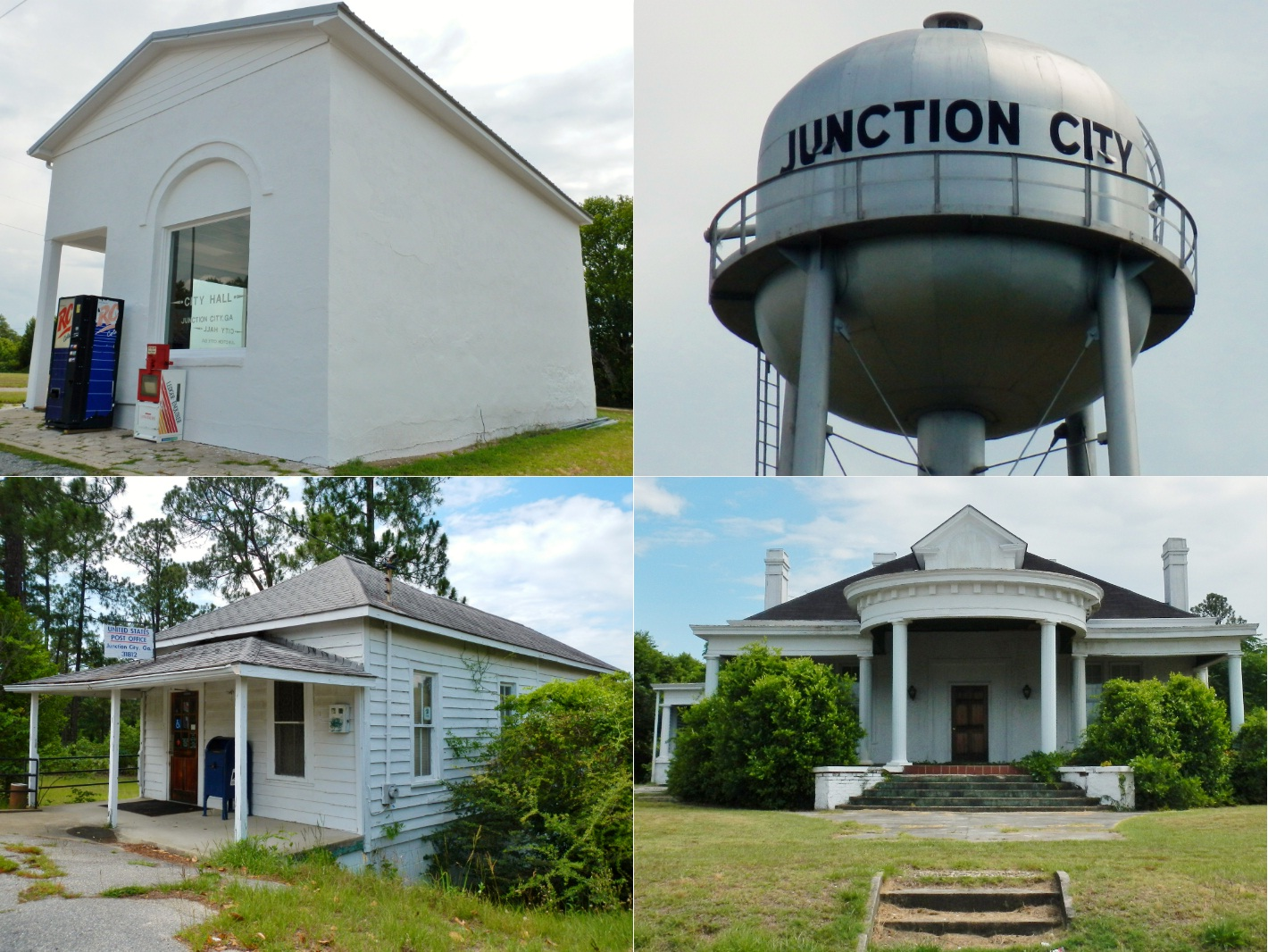
- Junction City (in 2012)

- Location in Talbot County and the state of Georgia
- Coordinates: 32°36′11″N 84°27′29″W
- Country: United States
- State: Georgia
- County: Talbot

Government
  - Type: Mayor-council government
  - Mayor: Chemia Henderson
  - Junction City Town Council: Members: Tyronne Bunkley; Darla Coulter; Celena Jones; Patricia Smith; Stephanie Smith

Area
  - Total: 2.48 sq mi (6.42 km^{2})
  - Land: 2.35 sq mi (6.09 km^{2})
  - Water: 0.13 sq mi (0.33 km^{2})
- Elevation: 689 ft (210 m)

Population (2020)
  - Total: 138
  - Density: 58.7/sq mi (22.67/km^{2})
- Time zone: UTC-5 (Eastern (EST))
  - Summer (DST): UTC-4 (EDT)
- ZIP code: 31812
- Area code: 706
- FIPS code: 13-42800
- GNIS feature ID: 316309

Junction City is a town in Talbot County, Georgia, United States. The population was 138 at the 2020 census.

== History ==
Junction City was platted at the site of a railway junction, hence the name. The Georgia General Assembly incorporated Junction City as a town in 1906.

== Geography ==
Junction City is located at 32°36′11″N 84°27′29″W (32.603083, -84.458190).

The city is located along the Fall Line Freeway (GA state routes 96 and 540), which runs west to east through the town, leading east 15 mi (24 km) to Butler and west 39 mi (63 km) to Columbus. Georgia State Route 90 also runs through the town, leading northwest 8 mi (13 km) to Talbotton, the county seat, and southeast 8 mi (13 km) to Mauk.

According to the United States Census Bureau, the town has a total area of 2.5 square miles (6.5 km^{2}), of which 2.5 square miles (6.5 km^{2}) is land and 0.1 square miles (0.26 km^{2}) (2.35%) is water.

== Demographics ==
Historical population
Census	Pop.	Note	%±
1910	225		—
1920	323		43.6%
1930	341		5.6%
1940	326		−4.4%
1950	259		−20.6%
1960	226		−12.7%
1970	269		19.0%
1980	254		−5.6%
1990	182		−28.3%
2000	179		−1.6%
2010	177		−1.1%
2020	138		−22.0%
U.S. Decennial Census; 1850-1870 1880; 1890-1910 1920-1930; 1930-1940 1940-1950; 1960-1980 1980-2000

Junction City first appeared in the 1910 U.S. census, with a population of 225.

=== Racial and ethnic composition ===
Junction City town, Georgia – Racial and ethnic composition Note: the US Census treats Hispanic/Latino as an ethnic category. This table excludes Latinos from the racial categories and assigns them to a separate category. Hispanics/Latinos may be of any race.
Race / Ethnicity (NH = Non-Hispanic)	Pop 2000	Pop 2010	Pop 2020	% 2000	% 2010	% 2020
White alone (NH)	68	35	38	37.99%	19.77%	27.54%
Black or African American alone (NH)	108	135	98	60.34%	76.27%	71.01%
Native American or Alaska Native alone (NH)	2	0	0	1.12%	0.00%	0.00%
Asian alone (NH)	0	0	0	0.00%	0.00%	0.00%
Native Hawaiian or Pacific Islander alone (NH)	0	0	0	0.00%	0.00%	0.00%
Other race alone (NH)	0	0	0	0.00%	0.00%	0.00%
Mixed race or Multiracial (NH)	0	1	2	0.00%	0.56%	1.45%
Hispanic or Latino (any race)	1	6	0	0.56%	3.39%	0.00%
Total	179	177	138	100.00%	100.00%	100.00%

=== 2020 census ===
As of the 2020 census, its population was 138.
