= Hogcrawl Creek =

Stream in Georgia, United States

Coordinates: 32.3803°N 83.8690°W

Hogcrawl Creek is a stream in the U.S. state of Georgia.

A "hog crawl" is an archaic term for a hog enclosure or corral.
