= Atrium Health Navicent Peach =

- Atrium Health
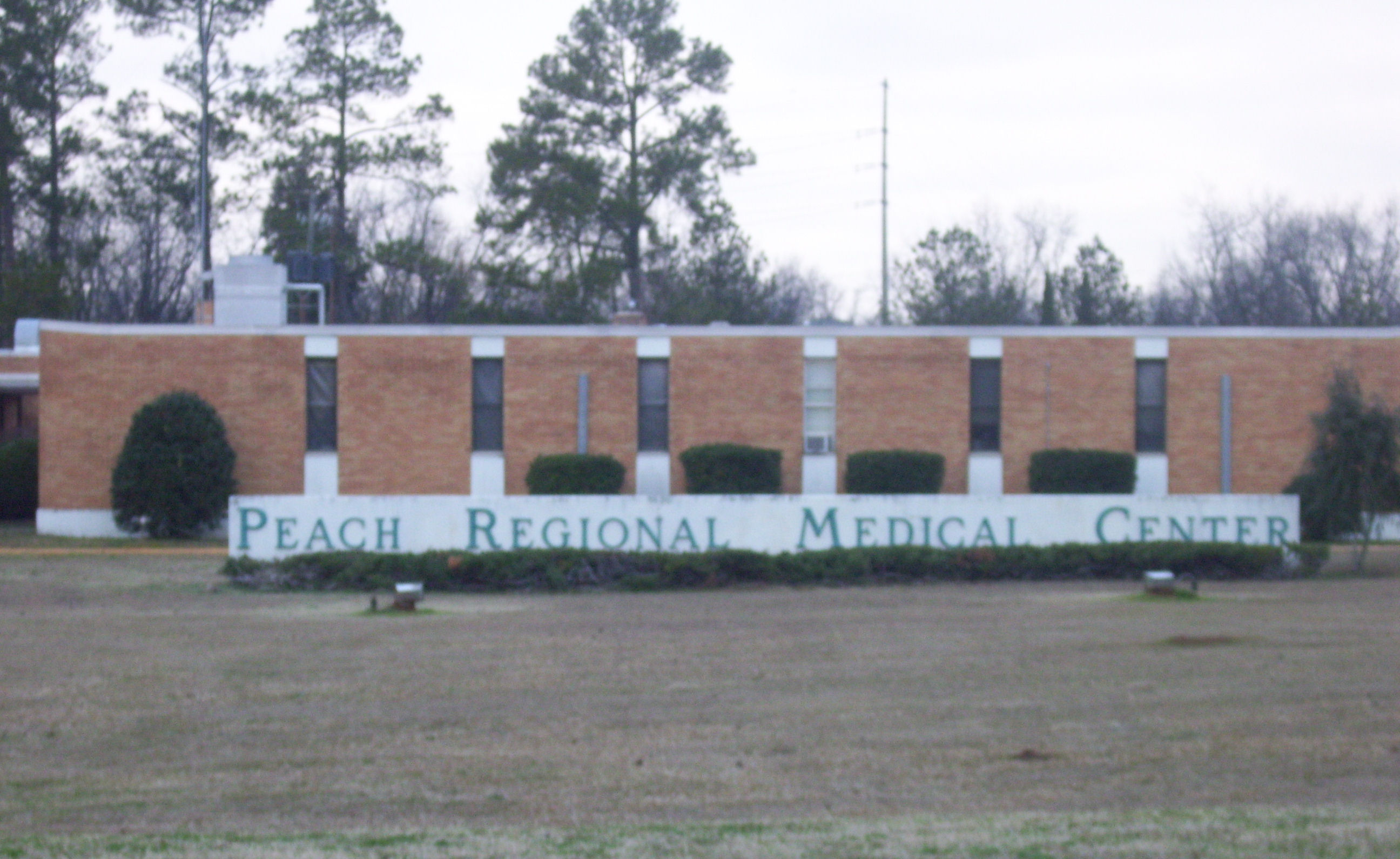

Geography
- Location: 1960 Georgia 247 Connector, Byron, Georgia, United States
- Coordinates: 32°36′17″N 83°45′33″W

Services
- Beds: 25

Helipads
- Helipad: Yes

History
- Former names: Peach Regional Medical Center; Peach County Hospital
- Founded: 1953

Links
- Website: https://www.navicenthealth.org/service-center/medical-center-of-peach-county
- Lists: Hospitals in Georgia

Atrium Health Navicent Peach, formally known as the Peach Regional Medical Center, is a critical access hospital located in Byron, Georgia.

== History ==
Opening in September 1953 as a non-profit acute-care hospital, Peach County Hospital's original building was funded through a grant from the Hill–Burton Program. Peach County Hospital became Peach Regional Medical Center in 1997.

Previously located in Fort Valley, Georgia, work on a new facility in Byron started in 2012.
