= Ideal, Georgia =

- City
- Location in Macon County and the state of Georgia
- Coordinates: 32°22′23″N 84°11′20″W
- Country: United States
- State: Georgia
- County: Macon

Area
  - Total: 1.15 sq mi (2.99 km^{2})
  - Land: 1.14 sq mi (2.96 km^{2})
  - Water: 0.012 sq mi (0.03 km^{2})
- Elevation: 482 ft (147 m)

Population (2020)
  - Total: 407
  - Density: 355.7/sq mi (137.34/km^{2})
- Time zone: UTC-5 (Eastern (EST))
  - Summer (DST): UTC-4 (EDT)
- ZIP code: 31041
- Area code: 478
- FIPS code: 13-40812
- GNIS feature ID: 0356328

Ideal is a city in Macon County, Georgia, United States. The population was 407 at the 2020 census, down from 499 in 2010.

== History ==
The community center of Ideal is the city's former railway station on the Atlanta, Birmingham and Atlantic Railway.

The town was originally named "Joetown", but when two railroad executives stopped in the town, one proclaimed it an "ideal" place for a railroad station, and the other declared he had just named it.

The Georgia General Assembly incorporated Ideal as a town in 1906.

== Geography ==
Ideal is located in western Macon County at 32°22′23″N 84°11′20″W (32.372918, -84.188822). Georgia State Route 90 passes through the center of town, leading southeast 10 miles (16 km) to Oglethorpe, the county seat, and northwest 8 miles (13 km) to Rupert. Ideal is located on the former Atlanta, Birmingham and Atlantic Railway, the former company's tracks are now utilized by CSX Transportation as the Fitzgerald Subdivison and pass through the city along its northern edge.

According to the United States Census Bureau, the city has a total area of 1.16 square miles (3.0 km^{2}), of which 0.01 square miles (0.03 km^{2}), or 0.95%, are water. It resides at the confluence of Whitewater and Cedar creeks, two spring-fed tributaries of the Flint River.

== Demographics ==
Historical population
Census	Pop.	Note	%±
1910	186		—
1920	304		63.4%
1930	285		−6.2%
1940	238		−16.5%
1950	318		33.6%
1960	432		35.8%
1970	543		25.7%
1980	619		14.0%
1990	554		−10.5%
2000	518		−6.5%
2010	499		−3.7%
2020	407		−18.4%
U.S. Decennial Census; 1850-1870 1880; 1890-1910 1920-1930; 1930-1940 1940-1950; 1960-1980 1990

=== Racial and ethnic composition ===
Ideal, Georgia – Racial and ethnic composition Note: the US Census treats Hispanic/Latino as an ethnic category. This table excludes Latinos from the racial categories and assigns them to a separate category. Hispanics/Latinos may be of any race.
Race / Ethnicity (NH = Non-Hispanic)	Pop 2000	Pop 2010	Pop 2020	% 2000	% 2010	% 2020
White alone (NH)	167	147	113	32.24%	29.46%	27.76%
Black or African American alone (NH)	343	330	270	66.22%	66.13%	66.34%
Native American or Alaska Native alone (NH)	1	1	0	0.19%	0.20%	0.00%
Asian alone (NH)	0	3	1	0.00%	0.60%	0.25%
Native Hawaiian or Pacific Islander alone (NH)	0	0	0	0.00%	0.00%	0.00%
Other race alone (NH)	0	2	0	0.00%	0.40%	0.00%
Mixed race or Multiracial (NH)	5	11	21	0.97%	2.20%	5.16%
Hispanic or Latino (any race)	2	5	2	0.39%	1.00%	0.49%
Total	518	499	407	100.00%	100.00%	100.00%

=== 2000 census ===
As of the 2020 United States census, there were 407 people, 124 households, and 64 families residing in the city.
