= Oglethorpe, Georgia =

- City
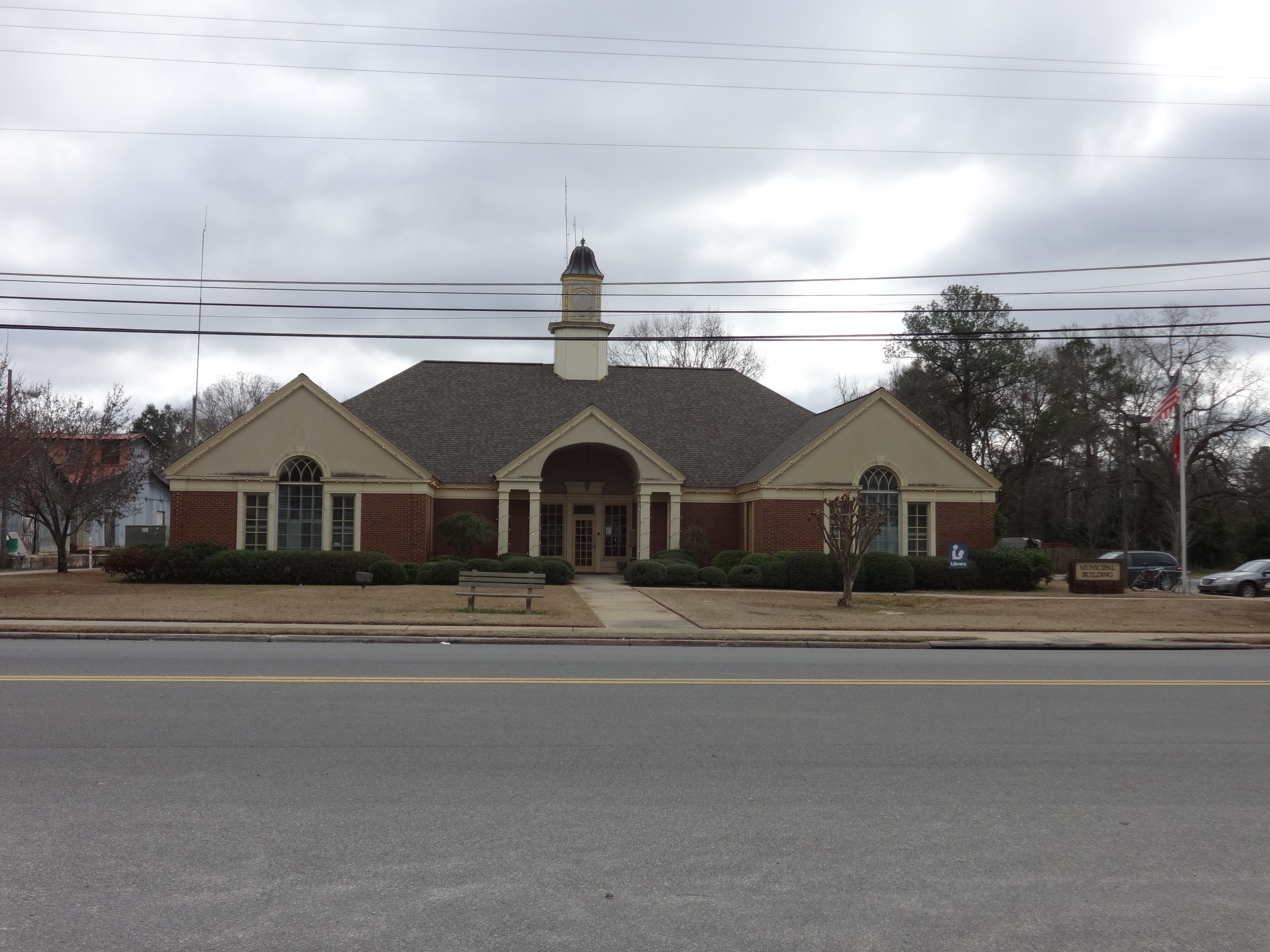
- Oglethorpe municipal building in Oglethorpe

- Location in Macon County and the state of Georgia
- Coordinates: 32°17′36″N 84°3′45″W
- Country: United States
- State: Georgia
- County: Macon

Area
  - Total: 2.05 sq mi (5.32 km^{2})
  - Land: 2.01 sq mi (5.20 km^{2})
  - Water: 0.046 sq mi (0.12 km^{2})
- Elevation: 341 ft (104 m)

Population (2020)
  - Total: 995
  - Density: 496.0/sq mi (191.49/km^{2})
- Time zone: UTC-5 (EST)
  - Summer (DST): UTC-4 (EDT)
- ZIP code: 31068
- Area code: 478
- FIPS code: 13-57736
- GNIS feature ID: 0332561
- Website: www.cityofoglethorpe.com

Oglethorpe is a city in Macon County, Georgia, United States. The population was 995 at the 2020 census, down from 1,328 in 2010. The city is the county seat of Macon County. It was named for Georgia's founder, James Oglethorpe.

== History ==
Oglethorpe was founded in 1838. It was located in the Black Belt of Georgia, where slaves outnumbered whites and cultivated cotton as a commodity crop. Oglethorpe was incorporated as a town in 1849 and as a city in 1852. In 1857, the seat of Macon County was transferred to Oglethorpe from Lanier.

Oglethorpe was once one of the largest cities in southwestern Georgia. Epidemics of malaria and smallpox caused high fatalities in the early 1860s; the remaining residents in Oglethorpe fled south to Americus to escape more disease.

== Geography ==
Oglethorpe is located in south-central Macon County at 32°17′36″N 84°3′45″W (32.293328, -84.062616). It sits on high ground west of the Flint River, which forms the boundary between Oglethorpe and the larger city of Montezuma.

Georgia State Route 49 passes through the center of town as Chatham Street. It leads east into Montezuma and northeast 15 miles (24 km) to Marshallville, while to the southwest it leads 20 miles (32 km) to Americus. State Route 90 enters from the north on North Randolph Street and Sumter Street and leaves to the east on Chatham Street. It connects Oglethorpe with Rupert 18 miles (29 km) to the northwest and with Vienna 23 miles (37 km) to the southeast. State Route 128 leaves Oglethorpe to the north with SR 90 but leads 19 miles (31 km) to Reynolds. State Route 26 (Riverview Drive) passes through the south side of Oglethorpe, leading east through Montezuma 36 miles (58 km) to Hawkinsville and west 17 miles (27 km) to Ellaville.

According to the U.S. Census Bureau, Oglethorpe has a total area of 2.1 square miles (5.4 km^{2}), of which 0.05 square miles (0.13 km^{2}), or 2.34%, are water.

== Demographics ==
Historical population
Census	Pop.	Note	%±
1850	113		—
1860	454		301.8%
1870	400		−11.9%
1880	442		10.5%
1890	486		10.0%
1900	545		12.1%
1910	924		69.5%
1920	871		−5.7%
1930	953		9.4%
1940	1,048		10.0%
1950	1,204		14.9%
1960	1,169		−2.9%
1970	1,286		10.0%
1980	1,305		1.5%
1990	1,302		−0.2%
2000	1,200		−7.8%
2010	1,328		10.7%
2020	995		−25.1%
U.S. Decennial Census; 1850–1870 1870–1880; 1890–1910 1920–1930; 1940 1950 1960; 1970 1980 1990; 2000 2010

Oglethorpe first appeared in the 1850 U.S. census.

=== Racial and ethnic composition ===
Oglethorpe city, Georgia – racial and ethnic composition Note: the US census treats Hispanic/Latino as an ethnic category. This table excludes Latinos from the racial categories and assigns them to a separate category. Hispanics/Latinos may be of any race.
Race / ethnicity (NH = non-Hispanic)	Pop 2000	Pop 2010	Pop 2020	% 2000	% 2010	% 2020
White alone (NH)	328	376	222	27.33%	28.31%	22.31%
Black or African American alone (NH)	842	893	685	70.17%	67.24%	68.84%
Native American or Alaska Native alone (NH)	3	1	2	0.25%	0.08%	0.20%
Asian alone (NH)	9	11	9	0.75%	0.83%	0.90%
Native Hawaiian or Pacific Islander alone (NH)	0	1	1	0.00%	0.08%	0.10%
Other race alone (NH)	4	0	2	0.33%	0.00%	0.20%
Mixed race or multiracial (NH)	4	4	21	0.33%	0.30%	2.11%
Hispanic or Latino (any race)	10	42	53	0.83%	3.16%	5.33%
Total	1,200	1,328	995	100.00%	100.00%	100.00%

=== 2020 census ===
As of the 2020 United States census, there were 995 people, 561 households, and 351 families residing in the city.

== Education ==
=== Macon County School District ===
The Macon County School District holds pre-school to grade twelve, and consists of one elementary school, a middle school, and a high school. The district has 129 full-time teachers and over 2,200 students.

- Macon County Elementary School
- Macon County Middle School
- Macon County High School
