= Reynolds, Georgia =

- City
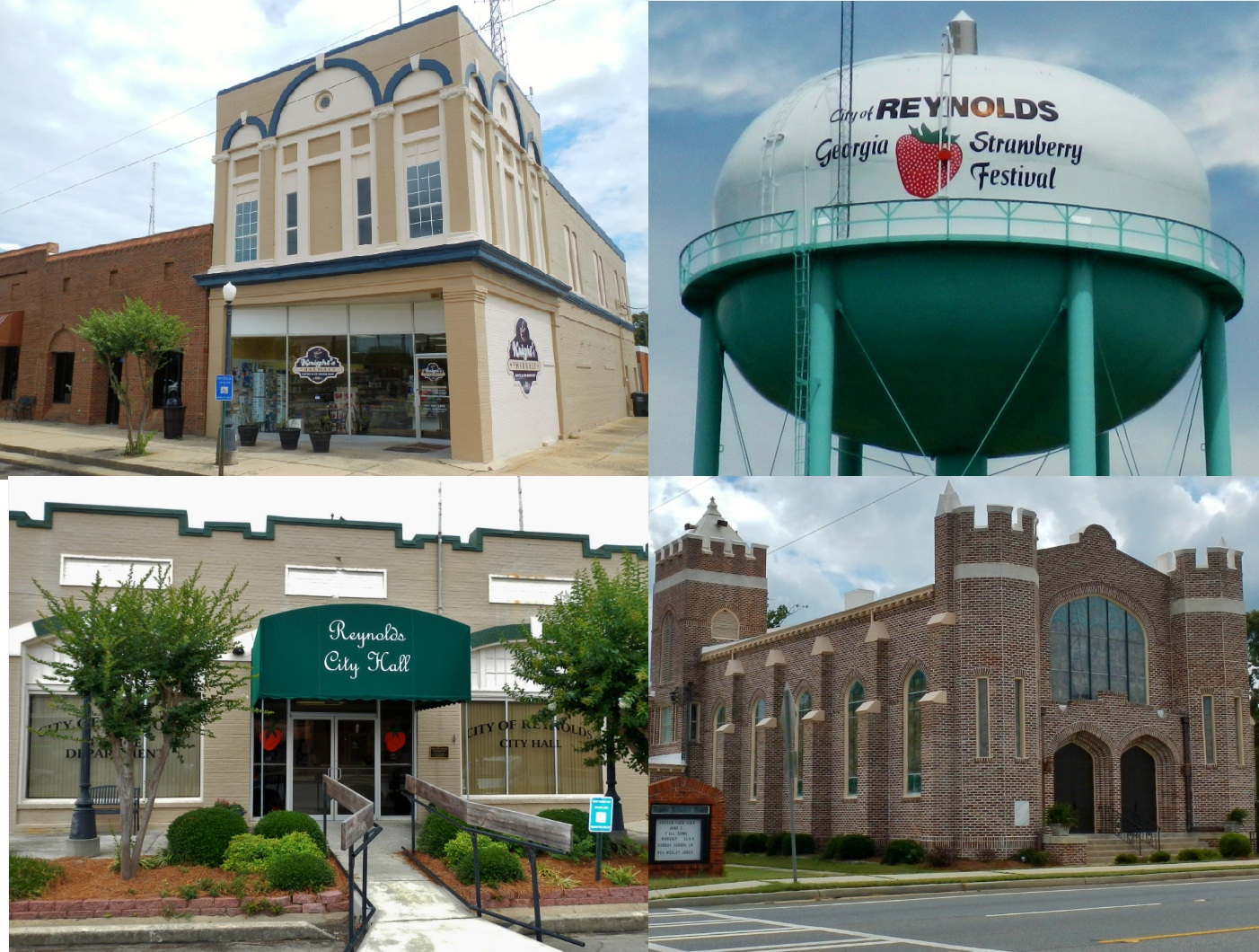
- A composite of Reynolds in 2012.

- Location in Taylor County and the state of Georgia
- Coordinates: 32°33′33″N 84°5′44″W
- Country: United States
- State: Georgia
- County: Taylor

Area
  - Total: 2.00 sq mi (5.18 km^{2})
  - Land: 1.99 sq mi (5.15 km^{2})
  - Water: 0.012 sq mi (0.03 km^{2})
- Elevation: 440 ft (134 m)

Population (2020)
  - Total: 926
  - Density: 465.3/sq mi (179.67/km^{2})
- Time zone: UTC-5 (Eastern (EST))
  - Summer (DST): UTC-4 (EDT)
- ZIP code: 31076
- Area code: 478
- FIPS code: 13-64876
- GNIS feature ID: 0321535
- Website: reynoldsga.com

Reynolds is a city in Taylor County, Georgia, United States. The population was 926 in 2020.

== History ==
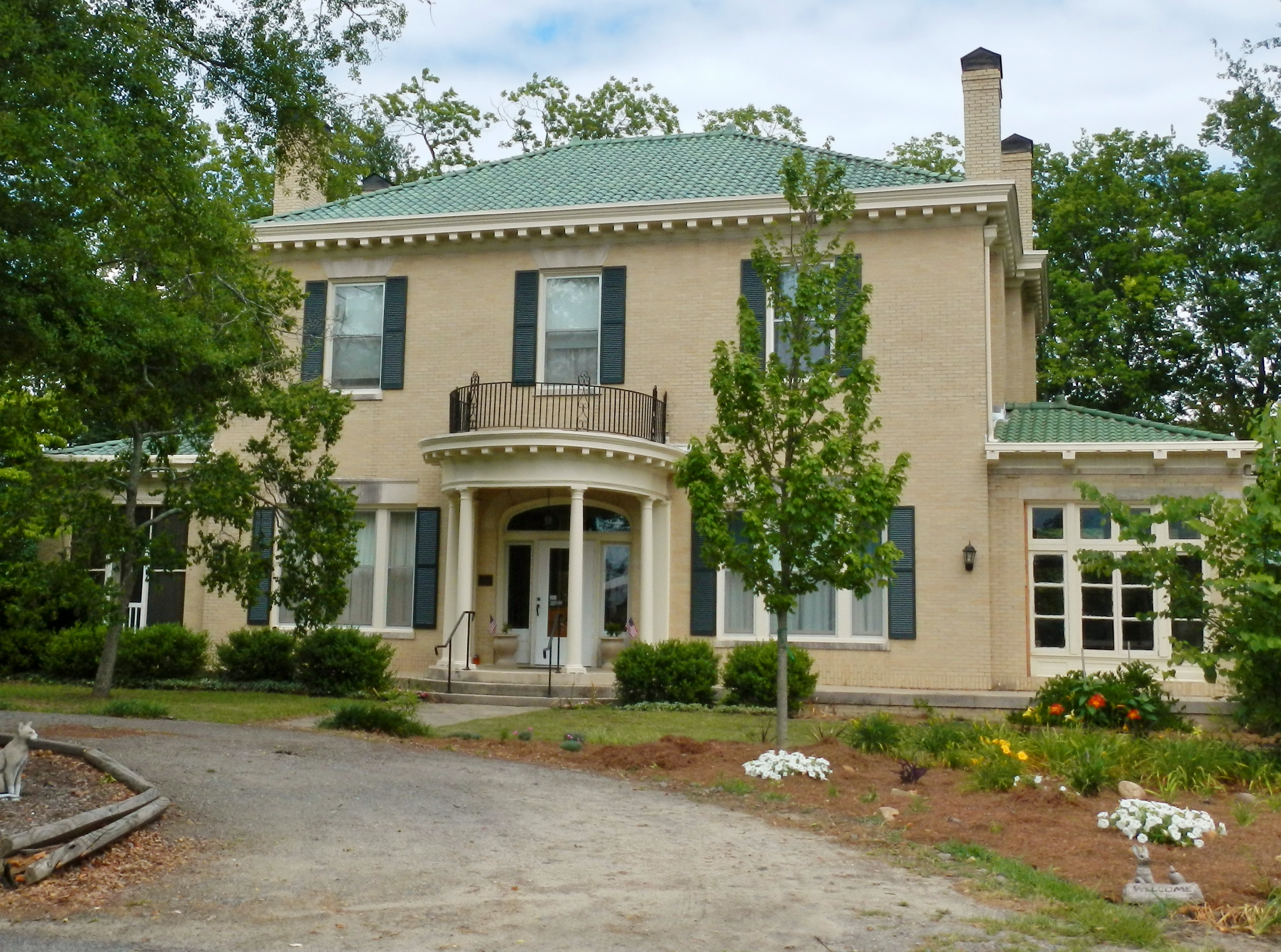
The Ferdinand Augustus Ricks House was built c. 1905 and was listed on the National Register of Historic Places on June 17, 1982.

The Georgia General Assembly incorporated Reynolds in 1865. The community was named after L. C. Reynolds, a railroad official.

== Geography ==
Reynolds is located in eastern Taylor County at 32.559167 N, -84.095556 W (32° 33′ 33″ N, 84° 5′ 44″ W).

The city is located in the eastern part of Taylor County along the Fall Line Freeway and Georgia State Route 96, which run from west to east through the center of the city. Via GA-540 and GA-96, Fort Valley is 13 mi (21 km) east, and Butler, the Taylor County seat, is 10 mi (16 km) west. Georgia State Route 128 also runs through the city, leading northeast 14 mi (23 km) to Roberta and south 19 mi (31 km) to Oglethorpe.

According to the United States Census Bureau, the city has a total area of 1.3 square miles (3.4 km^{2}), of which 1.3 square miles (3.4 km^{2}) is land and 0.75% is water.

== Demographics ==
Historical population
Census	Pop.	Note	%±
1880	278		—
1890	283		1.8%
1900	436		54.1%
1910	521		19.5%
1920	926		77.7%
1930	880		−5.0%
1940	871		−1.0%
1950	906		4.0%
1960	1,087		20.0%
1970	1,253		15.3%
1980	1,298		3.6%
1990	1,166		−10.2%
2000	1,036		−11.1%
2010	1,086		4.8%
2020	926		−14.7%
U.S. Decennial Census; 1850-1870 1870-1880; 1890-1910 1920-1930; 1940 1950 1960; 1970 1980 1990; 2000 2010

Reynolds racial composition as of 2020
Race	Num.	Perc.
White (non-Hispanic)	471	50.86%
Black or African American (non-Hispanic)	408	44.06%
Native American	16	1.73%
Other/Mixed	20	2.16%
Hispanic or Latino	11	1.19%

As of the 2020 United States census, there were 926 people, 486 households, and 229 families residing in the city.

== Notable people ==
- Earl Little Sr., the father of Malcolm X, was born in Reynolds on July 29, 1890.
- Samuel Little (June 7, 1940 – December 30, 2020) was born in Reynolds. Little may have been the most prolific serial killer in American history.
