= Rupert, Georgia =

- Unincorporated community
- Location within Georgia
- Coordinates: 32°26′26″N 84°16′48″W
- Country: United States
- State: Georgia
- County: Taylor
- Elevation: 440 ft (130 m)
- Time zone: UTC-5 (Eastern (EST))
  - Summer (DST): UTC-4 (EDT)
- ZIP code: 31081
- Area code: 478
- GNIS feature ID: 332942

Rupert is an unincorporated community in Taylor County, Georgia, United States. The community is located along U.S. Route 19, 8.4 miles (13.5 km) south-southwest of Butler. Rupert has a post office with ZIP code 31081.
