= Columbus–Auburn–Opelika combined statistical area =

Coordinates: 32°28′N 84°59′W

Greater Columbus, Georgia
- Combined Statistical Area
- Columbus–Auburn–Opelika, GA–AL; Combined Statistical Area
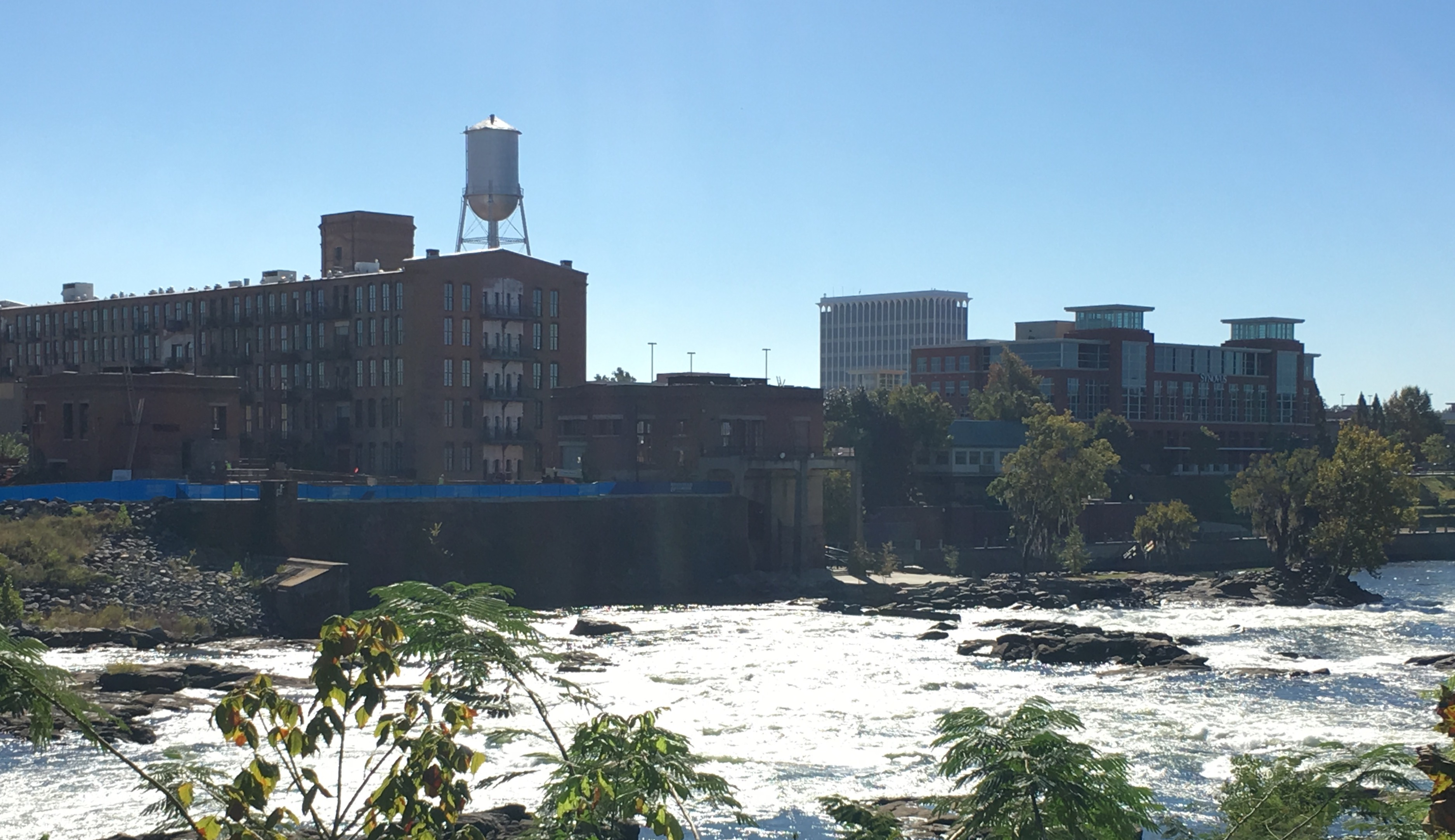
- Skyline of Columbus, Georgia
Columbus–Auburn–Opelika, GA–AL CSA
City of Columbus
Fort Benning
Columbus, GA–AL MSA
Auburn–Opelika, AL MSA
Alexander City, AL μSA
- Country: United States
- State: Georgia; Alabama
- Primary cities: Columbus, GA; Auburn, AL
- Other Anchor Cities: Phenix City, AL; Opelika, AL; Tuskegee, AL; Alexander City, AL

Area
  - Land: 3,392 sq mi (8,790 km^{2})

Population (2023 est.)
  - CSA: 566,030 (84th)
- Time zones: UTC−5 (EST)
  - Summer (DST): UTC−4 (EDT)
- UTC−6 (CST)
  - Summer (DST): UTC−5 (CDT)
- Area codes: 706, 762, 334

The Columbus–Auburn–Opelika, GA–AL Combined Statistical Area is a trading and marketing area made up of six counties in Georgia and three in Alabama. The statistical area includes two metropolitan areas: the Columbus metropolitan area and the Auburn–Opelika metropolitan area. As of 2023, the CSA had a population of 566,030.

The Combined Statistical Area consists of the:

- Columbus metropolitan area, population 323,768.
- Auburn–Opelika metropolitan area, population 201,585.
- Alexander City Micropolitan area, population 40,677

== Counties ==
=== In Georgia ===
- Chattahoochee County pop. 9,565
- Harris County pop. 34,668
- Marion County pop. 7,498
- Muscogee County pop. 206,922
- Stewart County pop. 5,314
- Talbot County pop. 5,733

=== In Alabama ===
- Lee County pop. 163,461
- Russell County pop. 57,938
- Tallapoosa County pop. 40,677

== Communities ==
The communities (both incorporated and unincorporated) in the combined statistical area are as follows. Bold name indicates the principal cities in the CSA:

In Alabama

- **Auburn** pop. 80,006
- Beauregard pop. 5,234
- Bee Hive pop. unknown
- Beulah pop. 6,173
- Fort Mitchell pop. 3,11
- Glenville pop. unknown
- Gold Hill pop. unknown
- Holy Trinity pop. unknown
- Hurtsboro pop. 592
- Ladonia pop. 1,943
- Loachapoka pop. 165
- Marvyn pop. 5,235
- Notasulga pop. 916 (in Lee county only)
- Opelika pop. 26,477
- Phenix City pop. 38,816
- Roxana pop. 1,942
- Salem pop. 6,428
- Seale pop. 2,382
- Smiths Station pop. 21,756
- The Bottle pop. unknown
- Waverly pop. 180 (in Lee county only)

In Georgia

- Buena Vista pop. 1,664
- Cataula pop. 3,784
- **Columbus** pop. 206,922
- Cusseta pop. 1,196
- Ellerslie pop. 3,292
- Fort Benning South pop. 11,737
- Hamilton pop. 307
- Hopewell pop. unknown
- Juniper pop. 2,830
- Mountain Hill pop. unknown
- Mulberry Grove pop. unknown
- Pine Mountain pop. 1,141
- Rehobeth pop. unknown
- Ridgeway pop. unknown
- Shiloh pop. 423
- Waverly Hall pop. 790
- West Point pop. 3,487
- Whitesville pop. 150

== Education institutes ==
=== Higher education ===
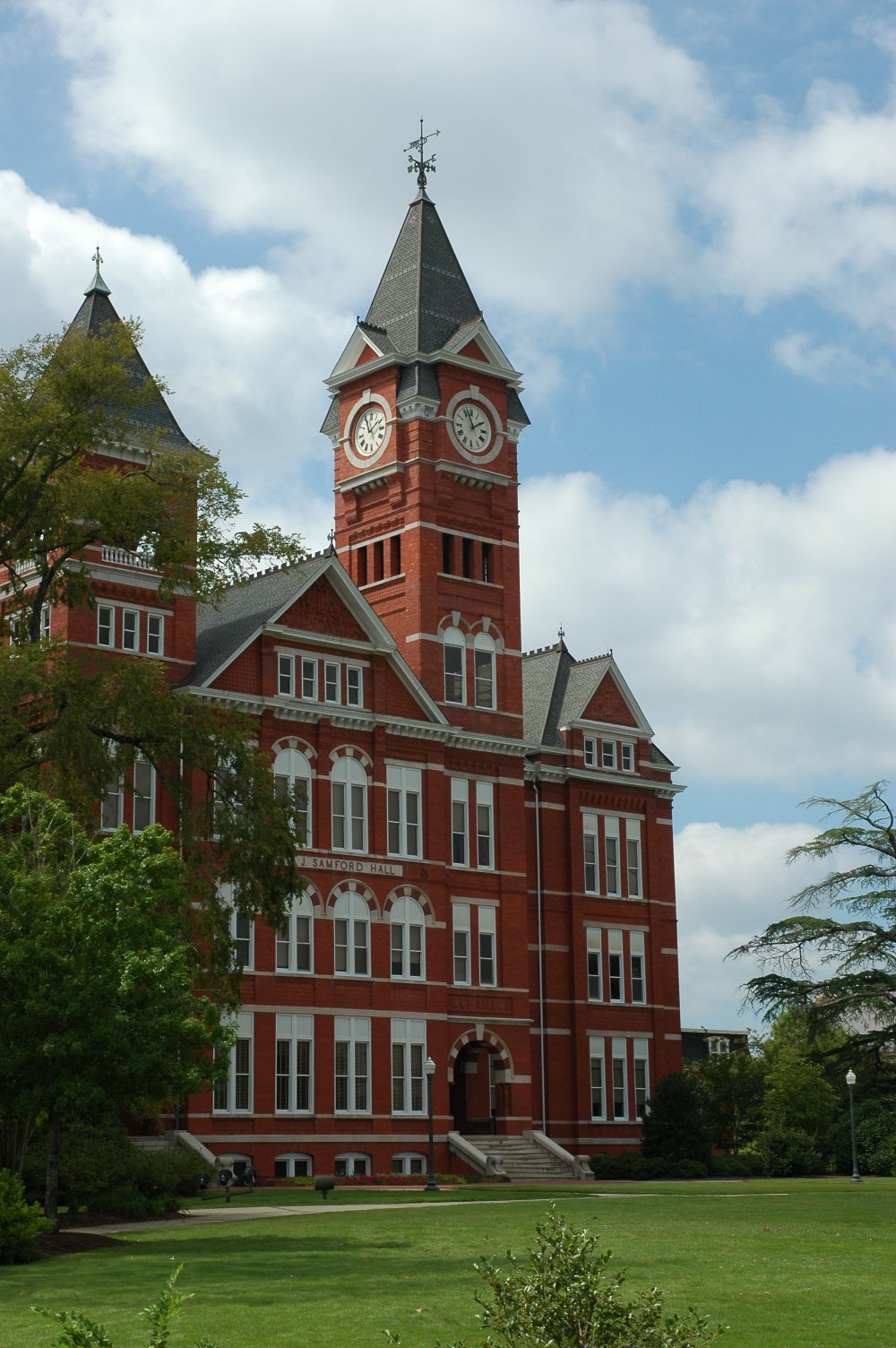
Samford Hall at Auburn University. Auburn is the largest university in the Greater Columbus area.

==== Public ====
- Auburn University
- Columbus State University
- Columbus Technical College
- Chattahoochee Valley Community College (Phenix City)
- Georgia Military College - main campus in Milledgeville, Georgia
- Southern Union State Community College (Opelika)
- Troy University - campuses in Columbus, Fort Benning, and Phenix City, main campus in Troy, Alabama

==== Private, for profit ====
- Christian Life School of Theology (Columbus)
- Miller-Motte Technical College - main campus in Wilmington, North Carolina
- Rivertown School of Beauty (Columbus)
- Southeastern Beauty School (Columbus)
- Strayer University - main campus in Baltimore, Maryland

== Transportation ==
=== Airports ===
Below is a list of the airports in the greater area, followed by their number of enplanements (commercial passenger boardings) that occurred at the airport in calendar year 2008.

==== Public ====
- Auburn-Opelika Robert G. Pitts Airport (IATA: AUO, ICAO: KAUO, FAA LID: AUO), 68
- Columbus Airport (IATA: CSG, ICAO: KCSG, FAA LID: CSG), 51,288

==== Private ====
- Harris County Airport (IATA: PIM, ICAO: KPIM, FAA LID: PIM), 116
- Jones Light Aviation Airport (FAA LID: AL56), n/a
- Lawson Army Airfield (IATA: LSF, ICAO: KLSF, FAA LID: LSF), 13,702
- Marion County Airport (FAA LID: 82A), n/a

=== Interstates ===
- Interstate 85
- Interstate 185

=== Principal Highways ===
- U.S. Route 27
- U.S. Route 29
- U.S. Route 80
- U.S. Route 280
- U.S. Route 431

=== State Highways ===
- Alabama State Route 14
- Alabama State Route 26
- Alabama State Route 51
- Alabama State Route 147
- Alabama State Route 165
- Alabama State Route 169
- Alabama State Route 267
- Georgia State Route 18
- Georgia State Route 22
- Georgia State Route 26
- Georgia State Route 27
- Georgia State Route 30
- Georgia State Route 36
- Georgia State Route 39
- Georgia State Route 41
- Georgia State Route 85
- Georgia State Route 90
- Georgia State Route 96
- Georgia State Route 103
- Georgia State Route 116
- Georgia State Route 127
- Georgia State Route 137
- Georgia State Route 190
- Georgia State Route 208
- Georgia State Route 219
- Georgia State Route 240
- Georgia State Route 315
- Georgia State Route 352
- Georgia State Route 354
- Georgia State Route 355
- Georgia State Route 520
- Georgia State Route 540

== Sports ==
Club	League
Auburn Tigers	NCAA Division I (Southeastern Conference)
Columbus River Dragons	Federal Prospects Hockey League
Columbus Lions	National Arena League
Columbus State University Cougars	NCAA Division II (Peach Belt Conference)

== Shopping ==
Below are some notable shopping centers in the area:

- Columbus Park Crossing (Columbus)
- Peachtree Mall (Columbus)
- The Landings (Columbus)
- The Shoppes at Bradley Park (Columbus)
- TigerTown (Opelika)
- Auburn Mall (Auburn)
