= Georgia State Route 26 =

State highway in Georgia

State Route 26
- SR 26 highlighted in red

Route information
- Maintained by GDOT
- Length: 272.2 mi (438.1 km)

Major junctions
- West end: US 27 / US 280 / SR 1 / SR 520 in Cusseta (inside Fort Benning)
- US 19 / SR 3 / SR 153 in Ellaville; US 41 / SR 7 in Henderson; I-75 near Henderson; I-16 southeast of Montrose; US 80 / SR 19 west of Dudley; US 1 / SR 4 / SR 57 near Swainsboro; I-95 in Pooler; I-516 / SR 21 / SR 25 in Garden City; I-16 / US 17 in Savannah; I-516 / US 17 / SR 21 / SR 25 in Savannah
- East end: US 80 at Butler Avenue/Tybrisa Street/Inlet Avenue in Tybee Island

Location
- Country: United States
- State: Georgia
- Counties: Chattahoochee, Marion, Schley, Macon, Houston, Pulaski, Bleckley, Laurens, Johnson, Emanuel, Bulloch, Bryan, Effingham, Chatham

Highway system
- Georgia State Highway System; Interstate; US; State; Special
← SR 25	→ SR 26E

State Route 26 (SR 26) is a 272.2-mile-long (438.1 km) state highway that travels west-to-east through portions of Chattahoochee, Marion, Schley, Macon, Houston, Pulaski, Bleckley, Laurens, Johnson, Emanuel, Bulloch, Bryan, Effingham, and Chatham counties through the central part of the U.S. state of Georgia. It crosses nearly the entire width of the state, connecting Cusseta, on the southeastern edge of Fort Benning, near Columbus to Tybee Island on the Atlantic coast near Savannah, via Buena Vista, Ellaville, Oglethorpe, Hawkinsville, Cochran, Dublin, Swainsboro, Statesboro, and Savannah.

== Route description ==
=== Chattahoochee to Houston counties ===
SR 26 begins at an intersection with US 27/US 280/SR 1/SR 520 (South Georgia Parkway) in Cusseta, in the southeastern part of Fort Benning, in Chattahoochee County. Just over 1,000 feet (300 m) later, it exits the base's border and crosses over a Norfolk Southern Railway line. It proceeds to the east on Clarke Duncan Highway and travels to the north of Chattahoochee County High School. SR 26 crosses over a Norfolk Southern Railway line once again and re-enters Fort Benning for just over 1 mile (1.6 km). At that point, the highway exits Fort Benning, Cusseta, and Chattahoochee County, and enters Marion County. South of Glen Alta, SR 26 intersects the southern terminus of SR 355 (Hatcher Road). Farther to the east, in Buena Vista, is an intersection with the southern terminus of SR 41 Conn. (Baker Street). One block later, SR 26 intersects the SR 41 mainline (Broad Street). Just past the Short Street intersection, the roadway begins paralleling a Norfolk Southern Railway line to the southeast. The highway then enters Schley County. Around the northwestern city limits of Ellaville, SR 26 and the Norfolk Southern Railway line take different paths to get to downtown. In downtown is an intersection with the northern terminus of SR 153. The highway curves to the east-northeast direction. Just before leaving the city limits of Ellaville, SR 26 intersects US 19/SR 3. After leaving town, it continues traveling to the east-northeast and enters Macon County. SR 26 travels through rural areas of the county. Southwest of Oglethorpe, it intersects SR 49. This intersection also marks the beginning of a concurrency with SR 49 Truck. The two highways travel to the northeast on the Oglethorpe–Montezuma Bypass, which crosses over a Norfolk Southern Railway line. Just after enter the city limits of Oglethorpe, the bypass ends, and SR 26/SR 49 Truck curves to the east-northeast. They cross over the Flint River and enter Montezuma. At South Dooly Street, southwest of the Flint River Community Hospital, SR 49 Truck departs to the north-northwest, concurrent with SR 90, which joins SR 26 to the east. This intersection is on the northeastern edge of Macon County High School. At Vienna Road, SR 90 departs to the southeast, and SR 224 begins, concurrent with SR 26. They cross over some railroad tracks of CSX on the John T. McKenzie Bridge. Just to the east of the entrance to Dr. C. P. Savage, Sr. Airport, SR 224 departs to the north. A little over 5 miles (8.0 km) farther to the east is the western terminus of SR 329. SR 26 travels to the northeast and curves back to the east just before entering Houston County.

=== Houston to Laurens counties ===
SR 26 travels nearly due east and enters Henderson, where it intersects US 41/SR 7. East-southeast of there is an interchange with Interstate 75 (I-75) at exit 127. The highway travels south-southwest of Elko. It travels to the east and curves to the southeast. After a very brief segment along the Houston–Pulaski county line, it enters Pulaski County proper. SR 26 travels through rural areas of the county as Columbus Highway until it enters Hawkinsville. In the northwestern part of town, it intersects US 129/US 341/SR 11. SR 26 travels to the east-southeast on Commerce Street, until it intersects US 129 Bus./US 341 Bus./SR 11 Bus. (Progress Avenue). All four highways travel concurrently to the southeast, and then to the east-northeast, on Commerce Street. At Jackson Street, US 129 Bus./SR 11 Bus. leaves the concurrency, and SR 112 joins. Two blocks later, US 129 Alt., which travels along a southbound-only section of Commerce Street that meet the east–west part that US 341 Bus./SR 26/SR 112 travels on. The four highways travel to the south-southeast, skirting along the western edge of Veterans Memorial Park, until they intersect US 341/SR 27/SR 230/SR 257 (Broad Street). At this intersection, US 129 Alt.'s southbound lanes and US 341 Bus. both meet their southern terminus, and US 341/SR 27/SR 230/SR 257 joins the concurrency. The seven-highway concurrency travels to the east-southeast and crosses over the Ocmulgee River on the Roger H. Lawson Memorial Bridge. Approximately 0.5 miles (0.80 km) later, in Hartford, SR 230 departs to the south-southeast on Lower River Road, US 341/SR 27 travels to the southeast on Eastman Highway, and US 129 Alt./SR 26/SR 112/SR 257 travels nearly due north on Cochran Highway. About 100 feet (30 m) later, they begin to curve to the northeast and pass northwest of the Hawkinsville–Pulaski County Airport. The concurrency begins a curve to a more north-northeast routing, and SR 257 departs the concurrency on Chicken Road. A few miles later, the concurrency enters Bleckley County. After US 129 Alt./SR 26/SR 112 enters Cochran, they intersect US 23 Bus./SR 87 Bus. (2nd Street). At this intersection, US 129 Alt./SR 112 turns left onto the business routes, while SR 26 continues into downtown. Just past Cedar Hill Cemetery is an intersection with the western terminus of SR 126 (Chester Road). Approximately 2,000 feet (610 m) later, the highway intersects US 23/SR 87. SR 26 then travels northwest of Bleckley County Elementary School and Uchee Trail Country Club. The highway travels through rural areas of the county and enters Laurens County.

=== Laurens to Bryan counties ===
Approximately 2.5 miles (4.0 km) after entering the county, SR 26 has an interchange with I-16 at exit 39. The highway then enters Bender, where it intersects US 80/SR 19. The three highways travel concurrently to the east. US 80 and SR 26 are concurrent for the rest of their length. In Dudley, the concurrency intersects SR 338 (2nd Street). The three highways travel south of the W. H. 'Bud' Barron Airport and enter Dublin just before they intersect US 441 Byp./SR 117. In the main part of the city, they intersect US 441/SR 29. At this intersection, SR 19 departs the concurrency to the south, while SR 29 joins. The concurrent highways circle around the Laurens County Superior Court. At Washington Street, US 319/SR 31 also joins the concurrency. The five highways cross over the Oconee River on the Herschel Lovett Bridge and enter East Dublin. US 319/SR 31 departs the concurrency to the northeast on Wrightsville Avenue. Almost immediately after that, SR 29 departs the concurrency to the southeast on Soperton Avenue. US 80/SR 26 crosses over a Norfolk Southern Railway line and travel through rural areas of the county before entering Johnson County. US 80/SR 26 travels through Scott and then enters Adrian. Just east of Kelly Street, they enter Emanuel County. In the main part of town, they intersect SR 15/SR 78 (Poplar Street). Immediately afterward, the concurrency crosses back into Johnson County. They curve to a north-northeast direction and cross over the Ohoopee River on the William H. Brantley Jr. Bridge and re-enter Emanuel County. The concurrent highways curve to the east-southeast and make a gradual curve to the northeast. They intersect US 221/SR 171 before crossing over the Little Ohoopee River. Just prior to entering the city limits of Swainsboro, they intersect US 1/SR 4/SR 57. Immediately to the east of the intersection, they enter Swainsboro and are known locally as West Main Street. At Tyson Street, SR 56 joins the concurrency through the city. Approximately 0.8 miles (1.3 km) later, they intersect US 1 Bus./SR 4 Bus. (Main Street). After crossing over a Norfolk Southern Railway line, SR 56 departs the concurrency. US 80/SR 26 curves to the east-southeast and enters Twin City. There, they have intersections with SR 192 (5th Avenue) and SR 23 (North Railroad Avenue). They travel through George L. Smith State Park and intersect SR 121 just before entering Bulloch County. After traveling through Portal, US 80/SR 26 intersects US 25/SR 67 in Hopeulikit. The four highways travel concurrently to the southeast, toward Statesboro. Just before entering the city limits, they intersect the northern terminus of US 25 Byp./SR 67 Byp. (Veterans Memorial Parkway), a partial bypass of the city. In the main part of Statesboro, they intersect US 301/SR 73 (North Main Street). At this intersection, US 25/SR 67 departs the US 80/SR 26 concurrency. The two highways curve to the southeast and pass Eastside Cemetery just before intersecting the southern terminus of SR 24 (East Main Street). Approximately 3,000 feet (910 m) before leaving the city limits, they intersect US 301 Byp./SR 73 Byp. (another segment of the Veterans Memorial Parkway). US 80/SR 26 travels through Brooklet, to the east of Southeast Bulloch High School. In Stilson, they intersect the northern terminus of SR 119 Conn. They travel to the southeast and have a brief concurrency with SR 119 just before entering Bryan County.

=== Bryan to Chatham counties ===
US 80/SR 26 enters Blitchton, where they intersect US 280/SR 30. At this intersection, US 280 meets its eastern terminus, while SR 30 joins the concurrency. The three highways cross over the Ogeechee River into Effingham County. After traveling through Eden, they cross over the Little Ogeechee River. Just before entering Chatham County, they intersect SR 17. At this intersection, SR 30 departs the concurrency, and SR 17 joins it. US 80/SR 17/SR 26 enters Bloomingdale. There, they have an intersection with the Jimmy DeLoach Parkway where SR 17 departs. In Pooler, the concurrent highways have an interchange with Pooler Parkway and then the eastbound and westbound lanes split into one-way streets. The lanes come back together just before the interchange with I-95 at exit 102. Along the Pooler–Garden City city line is an intersection with SR 307 (Dean Forest Road). After crossing over some Norfolk Southern and CSX railroad lines, they intersect the southern terminus of SR 26 Conn (Burnsed Boulevard). US 80/SR 26 curves to the southeast and enter Savannah, paralleling I-516/SR 21/SR 25 (W.F. Lynes Parkway). Farther to the southeast, they intersect SR 25 Conn. (West Bay Street). US 80/SR 25 Conn./SR 26 travels south-southwest on Collins Street, then turn left onto Augusta Avenue, to travel southeast to a partial interchange with I-516/SR 21/SR 25. Here, SR 25 Conn. meets its southern terminus. A short distance later, I-516/US 80/SR 21/SR 25/SR 26 crosses over various railroad tracks and have an incomplete interchange with West Gwinnett Street. Almost immediately is an interchange with I-16/US 17 (Jim Gillis Historic Savannah Parkway). At this point, US 17 joins the concurrency. A short distance later, the concurrency crosses over some railroad tracks of CSX and have an incomplete interchange with Tremont Road. At Ogeechee Road, US 17/SR 25 departs the concurrency to the southwest, while US 80/SR 26 departs to the northeast. The two highways cross over some railroad tracks of CSX and have an incomplete interchange with Stiles Avenue. They turn right onto Victory Drive. At Abercorn Street, they intersect the former SR 204. They skirt along the northeastern edge of Daffin Park. They meet the Harry S. Truman Parkway at an interchange. Then, they leave Savannah and travel through Thunderbolt, crossing over the Wilmington River and the Intracoastal Waterway. They cross over Gray Creek and then intersect the western terminus of Johnny Mercer Boulevard, the path of former SR 367. US 80/SR 26 also meets Islands Expressway, part of their former routing in the area. They have an intersection with the eastern terminus of Johnny Mercer Boulevard. Then, they cross over the Bull River and enter the property of the Fort Pulaski National Monument. US 80/SR 26 curves to the southeast and passes the entrance to the fort. The concurrency enters Tybee Island and meet their eastern terminus, an intersection with Butler Avenue (which continues after the terminus), Tybrisa Street, and Inlet Avenue.

=== National Highway System ===
The following portions of SR 26 are part of the National Highway System, a system of routes determined to be the most important for the nation's economy, mobility, and defense:

- From its western terminus in Cusseta to the interchange with I-16 southeast of Montrose
- The portion between US 441 Byp./SR 117 and US 441/SR 29 in Dublin
- From the western end of the US 25/SR 67 concurrency in Hopeulikit to the US 301 Byp./SR 73 Byp. intersection in Statesboro
- From the I-95 interchange in Pooler to an indeterminate point in Tybee Island

== History ==
=== 1920s ===
SR 26 was established at least as early as 1919 from SR 1 in Cusseta through Buena Vista, Ellaville, Oglethorpe, Montezuma, Unadilla, Hawkinsville, Cochran, Dublin, Adrian, Swainsboro, Metter, and Statesboro, and ended in Savannah. By the end of 1921, SR 23 was extended onto the Graymont–Metter segment. SR 46 was established on a more northern path between Graymont and Statesboro. By the end of 1926, US 80 was designated on SR 26 from a point west-southwest of Dublin to Graymont and from Statesboro and Savannah, as well as on SR 46 between Graymont and Statesboro. The entire Chatham County portion had a "completed hard surface". The entire Bryan County portion had a "completed semi hard surface". Five segments had a "sand clay or top soil" surface: from Oglethorpe to Montezuma; a segment southwest of the Bleckley–Laurens county line; from the west end of the US 80 and SR 19 concurrencies to Dublin; the Graymont–Metter segment; and from Statesboro to the Bulloch–Bryan county line. The entire Effingham County portion was indicated to be under construction. By the end of 1929, a portion east of Swainsboro had a completed hard surface. Four segments had a sand clay or top soil surface: nearly the entire Marion County portion of the Cusseta–Buena Vista segment; a small portion on the Marion–Schley county line; a portion west-northwest of Graymont; and from just southwest of Statesboro to the approximate location of Stilson. Three segments of SR 26 were indicated to be under construction: from Dublin to just east of the Johnson–Emanuel county line; a portion east-southeast of Graymont; and nearly the entire Metter–Statesboro segment. A portion of US 80/SR 46 east-southeast of Graymont was also under construction, while nearly the entire Bulloch County portion of its path between Graymont and Hopeulikit had a sand clay or top soil surface.

=== 1930s ===
By the middle of 1930, an unnumbered road was built from Savannah to the northeastern part of Tybee Island. The Oglethorpe–Montezuma segment of SR 26 had a completed hard surface. Three segments of the highway had a sand clay or top soil surface: the entire Marion County portion of the Cusseta–Buena Vista segment; a portion just west of the Marion–Schley county line; and from the Candler–Bulloch county line to Statesboro. From Graymont to the Candler–Bulloch county line, the highway was under construction. By the end of the year, from Dublin to just west of the Laurens–Johnson county line, it had a completed hard surface. From Graymont to the Effingham–Chatham county line, it had a sand clay or top soil surface. From just east of the Emanuel–Bulloch county line to Statesboro, it was indicated to be under construction. Also, the Savannah–Tybee Island road was under construction. By the end of 1931, US 80's eastern terminus was truncated to Blitchton. Its old path on SR 26 was redesignated as part of US 280. Three segments had a completed hard surface: from Swainsboro to Graymont; from Statesboro to the approximate location of Stilson; and from the Bulloch–Bryan county line to Savannah, as well as the Graymont to Statesboro segment of US 80/SR 46 and the Savannah–Tybee Island road. Three segments were indicated to be under construction: a segment northeast of Hawkinsville; a segment west-southwest of Dublin; and from the approximate location of Stilson to the Bulloch–Bryan county line. In January 1932, SR 26 was shifted north onto the Graymont–Statesboro segment of US 80. SR 46 was shifted onto the Metter–Statesboro segment. The Statesboro–Blitchton segment had a completed hard surface. In March, a portion west of Hawkinsville was under construction. The next month, a portion northwest of Buena Vista had a sand clay or top soil surface. By the end of July, a portion of the highway northeast of Hawkinsville also had this type of surface. In August, the Emanuel County portion of the Dublin–Adrian segment was under construction. The next month, two segments were under construction: a portion east-northeast of Ellaville and nearly the entire Henderson–Hawkinsville segment. In October, from the west end of the US 80 and SR 19 concurrencies to Dublin, the highway had a completed hard surface. Nearly the entire Pulaski County portion of the Henderson–Hawkinsville segment had completed grading, but no surface course. A portion east-southeast of Buena Vista was under construction. By the end of April 1933, the entire Johnson County portion had a completed hard surface. The Schley County portion of the Ellaville–Oglethorpe segment had a sand clay or top soil surface. The Marion County portion of the Buena Vista–Ellaville segment had completed grading, but was not surfaced. Two segments were indicated to be under construction: the Houston County portion of the Henderson–Hawkinsville segment and a portion west-southwest of Swainsboro. In May, a small portion east of the Schley–Macon county line was under construction. In September, the Emanuel County portion of the Dublin–Swainsboro segment had completed grading, but was not surfaced. The next month, nearly the entire Macon County portion of the Ellaville–Oglethorpe segment also had this type of treatment. In March 1934, the Emanuel County portion of the Dublin–Swainsboro segment had a sand clay or top soil surface. A segment of the highway southeast of Buena Vista to west of Ellaville was under construction. Later that year, SR 26 was extended from Savannah to Tybee Island. Two segments had a completed hard surface: the Marion County portion of the Buena Vista–Ellaville segment and from east of Adrian to Swainsboro. The Pulaski County portion of the Henderson–Hawkinsville segment had a sand clay or top soil surface. The portion of the highway from the Johnson–Emanuel county line to a point east of Adrian was under construction. Before the year ended, two segments had a completed hard surface: nearly the entire Marion County portion of the Cusseta–Buena Vista segment and the Emanuel County portion of the Dublin–Swainsboro segment. Also, the Pulaski County portion of the Henderson–Hawkinsville segment had a completed semi hard surface. In the first quarter of 1935, nearly the entire Chattahoochee County portion of the Cusseta–Buena Vista segment had completed grading, but was not surfaced. By the middle of the year, nearly the entire Pulaski County portion of the Henderson–Hawkinsville segment had a completed hard surface. A portion east of Montezuma had completed grading, but was not surfaced. The central part of the Macon County portion of the Montezuma–Henderson segment was under construction. By October, two segments were indicated to be under construction: the Schley County portion of the Ellaville–Oglethorpe segment and a portion northeast of Hawkinsville. By the end of the year, SR 26 was shifted to a more direct path between Cusseta and Buena Vista. The eastern part of the former path was redesignated as an extended SR 103. From Cusseta to the new SR 103 intersection had completed grading, but was not surfaced. The segment from Ellaville to Oglethorpe had a completed hard surface. Late in 1936, two segments had a completed hard surface: from Buena Vista to Ellaville and from Henderson to Hawkinsville. From Cusseta to the SR 103 intersection, the highway had a sand clay or top soil surface. Two segments were under construction: a portion northeast of Cochran and a small portion in Chatham County (east-southeast of the Effingham–Chatham county line). About a year later, nearly the entire Macon County portion of the Montezuma–Henderson segment had a completed hard surface. By the end of the year, US 80 was extended from Blitchton to Tybee Island. US 80/US 280/SR 26 was indicated to enter the western part of Savannah on Louisville Road. US 280 ended at US 17/SR 25 (Montgomery Street). US 80/SR 26 turned right onto US 17/SR 25. They turned left onto 37th Street, right onto Bull Street, and left onto Victory Street. By the middle of 1939, the Bleckley County portion of the Hawkinsville–Cochran segment had completed grading, but was not surfaced.

=== 1940s to 1960s ===
In early 1940, the Hawkinsville–Cochran segment had a completed hard surface. By the end of the next year, US 280's eastern terminus was truncated to Blitchton. In 1942, the Laurens County portion of the Cochran–Dublin segment was under construction. The next year, a small portion at the western terminus had a completed hard surface. Also, the Laurens County portion of the Cochran–Dublin segment had completed grading, but was not surfaced. By the end of 1946, US 17/US 80/SR 25/SR 26 was indicated to enter Savannah on Bay Street. They turned right onto Montgomery Street. US 17/SR 25 and US 80/SR 26 split at the 37th Street intersection. US 80/SR 26 then continued as before. By the middle of 1950, the Cochran–Dublin segment was hard surfaced. In 1953, the Cusseta–Buena Vista segment was also hard surfaced. By June 1954, SR 17 was extended onto US 80/SR 26 to Tybee Island (then called Savannah Beach). By June 1955, US 17/US 80/SR 17/SR 25/SR 26 was split onto one-way streets. US 17 north/US 80 west/SR 17 north/SR 25 north/SR 26 west used Montgomery Street, while US 17 south/US 80 east/SR 17 south/SR 25 south/SR 26 east used West Broad Street. US 80 east/SR 17 south/SR 26 east turned left onto 37th Street and resumed their previous path. Between June 1960 and June 1963, US 80/SR 17/SR 26 no longer turned onto 37th Street and Bull Street. They turned directly onto Victory Street. By the end of 1965, SR 17 was truncated to a point west of Savannah. In 1967, US 80 Toll was established on Bay Street, President Street Extension, and Islands Expressway from US 17/US 80/SR 25/SR 26 to US 80/SR 26 in Whitemarsh Island.

=== 1980s to 2010s ===
In 1982, US 80 Toll was decommissioned. In 1985, I-516 was designated on SR 21 from the west end of the freeway to just west of Montgomery Street. US 17/SR 25 was designated on SR 21 from the west end of the freeway to Ogeechee Road. US 80/SR 26 was designated on SR 21 from Bay Street to Ogeechee Road. Upon departing I-516/SR 21, US 80/SR 26 traveled on US 17S to Abercorn Street, where US 17S ended. The next year, US 17S was decommissioned. In 1995, US 17 was shifted off of I-516/US 80/SR 21/SR 25/SR 26 north of I-16 and onto I-16 and SR 404 Spur. In 2017, it was planned to extended Jimmy DeLoach Parkway from its current southern terminus at US 80/SR 17/SR 26, partially along the path of Bloomingdale Road (from SR 17's current southern terminus at I-16 to just south of its intersection with the northern terminus of Pine Barren Road). Construction on the extension began in 2018.

== Future ==
The at-grade intersection at Jimmy DeLoach Parkway's current southern terminus is to be converted into a full diamond interchange. The extension of the parkway is planned to be designated as SR 1251 until it is opened. The former alignment of SR 17 is planned to be redesignated as SR 17 Conn. Also, the eastern end of Osteen Road, which lies on the right-of-way of the extension, is to be shifted to the west.

== Major intersections ==
County	Location	mi	km	Exit	Destinations	Notes
Chattahoochee	Cusseta	0.0	0.0		US 27 / US 280 / SR 1 / SR 520 (South Georgia Parkway) – Richland, Lumpkin, Columbus	Western terminus
Marion		8.6	13.8		SR 355 north (Hatcher Road) – Geneva	Southern terminus of SR 355
Marion	Buena Vista	16.7	26.9		SR 41 Conn. north (Baker Street) – Geneva	Southern terminus of SR 41 Conn.
Marion	Buena Vista	16.8	27.0		SR 41 (Broad Street) – Preston, Talbotton	
Schley	Ellaville	31.3	50.4		SR 153 south (South Broad Street) – Preston	Northern terminus of SR 153
Schley	Ellaville	32.0	51.5		US 19 / SR 3 – Butler, Americus	
Macon	Fountainville	41.3	66.5		SR 240 west (Fountainville Road)	Eastern terminus of SR 240; former SR 195
Macon		41.9	67.4		Coogle Road east to SR 128 / SR 90 – Oglethorpe, Reynolds	Western terminus of Coogle Road, former SR 214 east
Macon		46.1	74.2		SR 49 / SR 49 Truck north – Andersonville, Americus, Oglethorpe	Western end of SR 49 Truck concurrency
Macon	Montezuma	49.7	80.0		SR 49 Truck south / SR 90 north (South Dooly Street) – Oglethorpe, Marshallville	Eastern end of SR 49 Truck concurrency; western end of SR 90 concurrency
Macon	Montezuma	50.4	81.1		SR 90 south (Vienna Road) / SR 224 begins – Byromville	Eastern end of SR 90 concurrency; western end of SR 224 concurrency; western terminus of SR 224
Macon	Montezuma	51.0	82.1	John T. McKenzie Bridge over CSX railroad tracks		
Macon		51.3	82.6		SR 224 east – Perry	Eastern end of SR 224 concurrency
Macon		56.5	90.9		SR 329 east – Unadilla	Western terminus of SR 329
Houston	Henderson	65.2	104.9		US 41 / SR 7 – Perry, Unadilla	
Houston		66.5	107.0		I-75 (SR 401) – Valdosta, Macon	I-75/SR 401 exit 127
Pulaski	Hawkinsville	84.1	135.3		US 129 / US 341 / SR 11 – Perry, Eastman	
Pulaski	Hawkinsville	84.3	135.7		US 129 Bus. north / US 341 Bus. north / SR 11 Bus. north (Progress Avenue) – Perry, Warner Robins	Western end of US 129 Bus./SR 11 Bus. and US 341 Bus. concurrencies
Pulaski	Hawkinsville	84.4	135.8		US 129 Bus. south / SR 11 Bus. south (Jackson Street) / SR 112 south / US 129 Alt. north – Abbeville	Eastern end of US 129 Bus./SR 11 Bus. concurrency; western end of SR 112 concurrency; southern terminus of US 129 Alt.
Pulaski	Hawkinsville	84.8	136.5		US 129 Alt. north (Commerce Street)	Western end of US 129 Alt. concurrency; both roadways are on one-way streets that meet.
Pulaski	Hawkinsville	85.0	136.8		US 341 north / SR 27 west / SR 230 west / SR 257 south (Broad Street) / US 341 Bus. north	Eastern end of US 341 Bus. concurrency; western end of US 341/SR 27, SR 230, and SR 257 concurrencies
Pulaski	Hawkinsville	85.1	137.0	Roger H. Lawson Memorial Bridge over the Ocmulgee River		
Pulaski	Hartford	85.8	138.1		US 341 south / SR 27 east / SR 230 east (Eastman Highway) – Eastman, Rhine	Eastern end of US 341/SR 27 and SR 230 concurrencies
Pulaski		87.1	140.2		SR 257 east (Chicken Road)	Eastern end of SR 257 concurrency
Bleckley	Cochran	95.2	153.2		US 23 Bus. / US 129 Alt. north / SR 87 Bus. / SR 112 north (2nd Street) – Macon, Eastman	Eastern end of US 129 Alt. and SR 112 concurrencies
Bleckley	Cochran	96.3	155.0		SR 126 east (Chester Road) – Chester, Cadwell, Airport	Western terminus of SR 126
Bleckley	Cochran	96.7	155.6		US 23 / SR 87 – Macon, Eastman	
Bleckley		101.2	162.9		SR 278 north (Montrose Road) – Montrose	Southern terminus of SR 278
Laurens		112.3	180.7		I-16 (Jim L. Gillis Historic Savannah Parkway / SR 404) – Macon, Savannah	I-16/SR 404 exit 39
Laurens	Bender	113.5	182.7		US 80 west / SR 19 north	Western end of US 80 and SR 19 concurrencies
Laurens	Dudley	116.2	187.0		SR 338 – Irwinton, Dexter	
Laurens		121.8	196.0		US 441 Byp. / SR 117	
Laurens	Dublin	126.3	203.3		US 441 / SR 19 north / SR 29 south – Irwinton, Glenwood	Eastern end of SR 19 concurrency; western end of SR 29 concurrency
Laurens	Dublin	126.5	203.6		US 319 / SR 31 south to I-16 (SR 404)	Western end of US 319/SR 31 concurrency
Laurens	Oconee River	127.1	204.5			
Laurens	East Dublin	128.4	206.6		US 319 north / SR 31 (Wrightsville Avenue) – Wrightsville	Eastern end of US 319/SR 31 concurrency
Laurens	East Dublin	128.5	206.8		SR 29 south (Soperton Avenue) – Soperton	Eastern end of SR 29 concurrency
Emanuel–Johnson county line	Adrian	145.9	234.8		SR 15 – Soperton, Wrightsville	
Emanuel		152.7	245.7		US 221 / SR 171 – Soperton, Kite	
Emanuel		160.0	257.5		US 1 / SR 4 / SR 57 – Wadley, Oak Park, Stillmore, Lyons	
Emanuel	Swainsboro	161.3	259.6		SR 56 south (Tyson Street) / Kite Road north – Soperton, Stillmore, Wrightsville, Southeastern Technical College, Airport	Western end of SR 56 concurrency; former SR 57 west (Kite Road)
Emanuel	Swainsboro	162.1	260.9		US 1 Bus. / SR 4 Bus. (North Main Street) – Wadley, Oak Park, Lyons, Augusta	Former SR 57 east (South Main Street) to US 1
Emanuel	Swainsboro	162.6	261.7		SR 56 north – Midville, Waynesboro	Eastern end of SR 56 concurrency
Emanuel	Twin City	172.2	277.1		SR 192 (5th Avenue) – Summertown, Stillmore	
Emanuel	Twin City	173.0	278.4		SR 23 (Railroad Street) – Millen, Metter	
Emanuel		180.2	290.0		SR 121 – Millen, Metter	
Bulloch	Hopeulikit	191.7	308.5		US 25 north / SR 67 north – Millen, Magnolia Springs State Park	Western end of US 25/SR 67 concurrency
Bulloch	Westchester	196.1	315.6		US 25 Byp. south / SR 67 Byp. south (Veterans Memorial Parkway) – Claxton	Northern terminus of US 25 Byp./SR 67 Byp.
Bulloch	Statesboro	198.2	319.0		US 25 south / US 301 / SR 67 south / SR 73 (North Main Street) – Sylvania, Claxton, Fort Stewart	Eastern end of US 25/SR 67 concurrency
Bulloch	Statesboro	199.1	320.4		SR 24 (East Main Street) – Oliver	
Bulloch	Statesboro	200.5	322.7		US 301 Byp. (Veterans Memorial Parkway / SR 73 Byp.) – Claxton, Sylvania, Airport	
Bulloch	Stilson	215.6	347.0		SR 119 Conn. south – Stilson, Springfield	Northern terminus of SR 119 Conn.
Bryan	Ellabell	223.2	359.2		SR 119 north – Guyton, Springfield	Western end of SR 119 concurrency
Bryan	Ellabell	223.4	359.5		SR 119 south to I-16 (SR 404) – Metter, Pembroke	Eastern end of SR 119 concurrency
Bryan	Blitchton	228.0	366.9		US 280 west / SR 30 west to I-16 (SR 404) – Pembroke	Western end of SR 30 concurrency; eastern terminus of US 280; former western end of US 280 concurrency
Effingham		234.9	378.0		SR 17 north / SR 30 east – Guyton	Eastern end of SR 30 concurrency, western end of SR 17 concurrency
Chatham	Bloomingdale	236.9	381.3		SR 17 Conn. south / SR 17 south (Jimmy DeLoach Parkway east) to I-95 (SR 405)	Eastern end of SR 17 concurrency; current western terminus of Jimmy DeLoach Parkway; northern terminus of SR 17 Conn.; diamond interchange
Chatham	Bloomingdale	237.5	382.2		Cherry Street south	Former eastern end of SR 17 concurrency
Chatham	Pooler	239.5	385.4		Pooler Parkway to I-16 (SR 404) / I-95 (SR 405)	Interchange
Chatham	Pooler	241.4	388.5		I-95 (SR 405) – Florence, Brunswick	I-95/SR 405 exit 102
Chatham	Garden City	244.3	393.2		SR 307 (Dean Forest Road) to I-16 (SR 404) – Port Wentworth	
Chatham	Garden City	246.6	396.9		Chatham Parkway south / Heidt Street north – Chatham County Administrative Complex	Northern terminus of Chatham Parkway; southern terminus of Heidt Street; former SR 167 south
Chatham	Garden City	247.7	398.6		SR 26 Conn. north (Bypass Road) to SR 21 north	Southern terminus of SR 26 Conn.; erroneously signed as "To SR 25 Conn." as well
Chatham	Garden City	247.9	399.0		Main Street north	Former US 17 north / SR 25 north
Chatham	Savannah	248.7	400.2		SR 25 Conn. north (Bay Street) – Downtown	Western end of SR 25 Conn. concurrency; former US 17/SR 21/SR 25 south/US 80/SR 26 east
Chatham	Savannah	248.9	400.6		SR 25 Conn. ends / I-516 west / SR 21 north / SR 25 north / Augusta Avenue east	Eastern end of SR 25 Conn. concurrency; western end of I-516/SR 21/SR 25 concurrency; eastern terminus of SR 25 Conn.; no eastbound access to I-516 west; I-516/SR 21/SR 421 exit 7A
Chatham	Savannah	249.7	401.9	6	Gwinnett Street – Amtrak station	Westbound exit and eastbound entrance; exit numbers follow I-516/SR 21/SR 421.
Chatham	Savannah	249.9	402.2	5	I-16 (SR 404) / US 17 north – Macon	Western end of US 17 concurrency; I-16/SR 21/SR 421 exits 164A-B
Chatham	Savannah	250.7	403.5	4	Tremont Road	Westbound exit and eastbound entrance
Chatham	Savannah	251.3	404.4		I-516 east / SR 21 south (W.F. Lynes Parkway east) / US 17 south (SR 25 south / Ogeechee Road west) – Brunswick, Savannah Tech, Hunter Army Air Field	Eastern end of I-516/SR 21/SR 25 and US 17 concurrencies; I-516/SR 21/SR 421 exit 3
Chatham	Savannah	252.5	406.4		Stiles Avenue	No westbound exit; interchange; former US 17 Alt. north/SR 25A north
Chatham	Savannah	253.6	408.1		Martin Luther King Jr. Boulevard	Former US 17S
Chatham	Savannah	253.7	408.3		Montgomery Street	Former US 17N
Chatham	Savannah	254.1	408.9		Abercorn Street	Former SR 204
Chatham	Savannah	255.9	411.8		Harry S.Truman Parkway	Interchange
Chatham	Whitemarsh Island	259.0	416.8		Johnny Mercer Boulevard east / Shipwatch Road north	Western terminus of Johnny Mercer Boulevard; southern terminus of Shipwatch Road; former US 80 east / SR 367 east
Chatham	Whitemarsh Island	260.1	418.6		Islands Expressway west	Partial interchange; western end of Islands Expressway portion
Chatham	Turner Creek	261.3	420.5	Bridge; eastern end of Islands Expressway		
Chatham	Talahi Island	262.7	422.8		Johnny Mercer Boulevard	Former US 80 west / SR 367 west
Chatham	Tybee Island	272.2	438.1		US 80 ends / Butler Avenue south / Tybrisa Street / Inlet Avenue south	Eastern end of US 80 concurrency; eastern terminus of US 80 and SR 26; eastern end of Butler Avenue portion; northern terminus of Inlet Avenue
1.000 mi = 1.609 km; 1.000 km = 0.621 mi: Concurrency terminus

== Special routes ==
=== Hawkinsville spur route ===
State Route 26 Spur
- Location: Hawkinsville
- Existed: 1965–1991

State Route 26 Spur (SR 26 Spur) was a spur route of SR 26 that existed in the central part of Hawkinsville. It was entirely in the central part of Pulaski County. Between June 1963 and the end of 1965, it was established and paved from US 129 north/US 341 south/SR 27/SR 230/SR 257 (Broad Street) to US 129 south/US 341 north/SR 26 (Commerce Street). Between the beginning of 1984 and the beginning of 1992, SR 26 Spur was decommissioned and redesignated as US 341 Truck/SR 230 Truck.

The entire route was in Hawkinsville, Pulaski County.

mi	km	Destinations	Notes
		US 129 north / US 341 south / SR 27 / SR 230 / SR 257 (Broad Street)	Southern terminus
		US 129 south / US 341 north / SR 26 (Commerce Street)	Northern terminus
1.000 mi = 1.609 km; 1.000 km = 0.621 mi

=== Hartford connector route ===
State Route 26 Connector
- Location: Hartford
- Existed: 1965–1991

State Route 26 Connector (SR 26 Conn.) was a connecting route of SR 26 that existed in Hartford in the central part of Pulaski County. Between June 1963 and the end of 1965, it was established from US 129/US 341 north/SR 26/SR 27 south/SR 257 to US 341/SR 27. It was entirely concurrent with US 341 north/SR 27. Between the beginning of 1984 and the beginning of 1992, it was decommissioned.

The entire route was in Hartford, Pulaski County.

mi	km	Destinations	Notes
		US 129 / US 341 north / SR 26 / SR 27 south / SR 257	Western terminus; west end of US 341/SR 27 concurrency
		US 341 / SR 27	Eastern terminus; east end of US 341/SR 27 concurrency
1.000 mi = 1.609 km; 1.000 km = 0.621 mi

=== Garden City connector route ===
State Route 26 Connector
- Location: Garden City
- Length: 0.2 mi (320 m)
- Existed: 1985–present

State Route 26 Connector (SR 26 Conn.) is a 0.2-mile-long (0.32 km) connector route that exists entirely within the north-central part of Chatham County. The entire route is in the northeastern part of Garden City. It is known as Burnsed Boulevard for its entire length.

It begins at an intersection with US 80/SR 26. The highway curves to the north-northeast until it meets its northern terminus, an interchange with I-516/SR 21/SR 25.

The entire length of SR 6 Conn. is part of the National Highway System, a system of routes determined to be the most important for the nation's economy, mobility, and defense.

Between the beginning of 1977 and the end of 1985, SR 26 Conn. was established on its current path.

The entire route is in Garden City, Chatham County.

mi	km	Destinations	Notes
0.0	0.0	US 80 / SR 26 – Pooler	Southern terminus
0.1– 0.2	0.16– 0.32	I-516 east (SR 421 east / W.F. Lynes Parkway) / SR 21 south / SR 25 south to I-16 SR 21 north (Augusta Road) / SR 25 north (Burnsed Boulevard north)	No access from I-516 westbound to SR 26 Conn.; northern terminus; I-516/SR 21/SR 25 exit 8; SR 25 takes on the Burnsed Boulevard name.
1.000 mi = 1.609 km; 1.000 km = 0.621 mi: Incomplete access

=== Savannah loop route ===
State Route 26 Loop
- Location: Savannah
- Length: 8.5 mi (13.7 km)
- Existed: 1963–1978

State Route 26 Loop (SR 26 Loop) was a loop route that existed entirely within the central part of Chatham County. Most of it was in the city limits of Savannah. All of its routing was later used for the route of I-516.

Between June 1960 and June 1963, SR 26 Loop was established and paved on DeRenne Avenue from Montgomery Street to southeast of Savannah. It was proposed to be built from US 17/US 80/SR 17/SR 25/SR 26 on the northwestern edge of Savannah south-southwest to just south of US 17/SR 25 and then east-southeast to Montgomery Street. By the end of 1965, it was proposed to be extended from DeRenne Avenue/La Roche Avenue north-northeast to US 80/SR 26 west-northwest of Thunderbolt. In 1966, the loop was under construction from Augusta Avenue to Liberty Parkway. It was completed from Liberty Parkway to Montgomery Street. The next year, the segment from Liberty Parkway to I-16 was indicated to "open spring '68". In 1968, SR 26 Loop was open from I-16 to Liberty Parkway. In 1970, the loop was open from Augusta Avenue to I-16. It was proposed to be extended to US 17/US 80/SR 25/SR 26 southeast of Fair Street. In 1977, this extension was open. In 1978, it was redesignated as part of an eastern extension of SR 21.

=== Savannah connector route ===
State Route 26 Connector
- Location: Savannah
- Existed: 1969–1985

State Route 26 Connector (SR 26 Conn.) was a connecting route of SR 26 that existed in the central part of Chatham County. It was in the western part of Savannah. Between the beginning of 1945 and the end of 1946, US 17/SR 25 entered Savannah from the southwest on Ogeechee Street. They turned right onto 37th Street and left onto US 80/SR 26 (Montgomery Street). In 1953, US 17/SR 25's northbound and southbound lanes split. Their northbound lanes traveled on Mills B. Lane Boulevard, 52nd Street, and curved left onto Montgomery Street. Between June 1963 and the end of 1965, SR 25 Spur was designated on US 17's northbound lanes. SR 25 only traveled on US 17's southbound lanes. In 1969, it was redesignated as SR 26 Conn. In 1985, the connector was decommissioned.

=== Whitemarsh Island–Wilmington Island loop route ===
State Route 26 Loop
- Location: Whitemarsh Island–Wilmington Island
- Existed: 1965–1969

State Route 26 Loop (SR 26 Loop) was an east–west loop route of SR 26 that was located in the east-central part of the state. It was completely within Chatham County in the Savannah metropolitan area. Between June 1963 and the end of 1965, it was established from US 80/SR 26 in Whitemarsh Island, then southeast over Turner Creek, then northeast and north-northeast to US 80/SR 26 in Wilmington Island. Its entire length was hard surfaced. In 1969, it was redesignated as SR 367.

=== Savannah Beach spur route ===
State Route 26 Spur
- Location: Savannah Beach
- Existed: 1965–1969

State Route 26 Spur (SR 26 Spur) was a spur route of SR 26 that existed in two parts in Savannah Beach, what Tybee Island was known as at the time. Between June 1963 and the end of 1965, the western segment of SR 26 Spur was established between two intersections with US 80/SR 26 in the northern part of the city. It traveled on North Campbell Avenue, Van Horne Avenue, Taylor Street, Meddin Drive, Cedarwood Avenue, another segment of Van Horne Avenue, and 2nd Avenue. An eastern segment was established from US 80/SR 26 east-southeast to SR 26 Loop in the southern part of the city. In 1969, both segments of the spur route were decommissioned.

The entire route was in Savannah Beach, Chatham County.

mi	km	Destinations	Notes
		US 80 / SR 26	Western terminus
		US 80 / SR 26	Eastern terminus
Gap in route
		US 80 / SR 26	Western terminus
		SR 26 Loop	Eastern terminus
1.000 mi = 1.609 km; 1.000 km = 0.621 mi

=== Savannah Beach loop route ===
State Route 26 Loop
- Location: Savannah Beach
- Existed: 1965–1969

State Route 26 Loop (SR 26 Loop) was a loop route of SR 26 that existed in the eastern part of Chatham County, in Savannah Beach, which is what Tybee Island was known at the time. Between June 1963 and the end of 1965, it was established between two intersections with US 80/SR 26 in the southern part of the city. In 1969, it was redesignated as SR 26E.

The entire route was in Savannah Beach, Chatham County.

mi	km	Destinations	Notes
		US 80 / SR 26	Western terminus
		US 80 / SR 26	Eastern terminus
1.000 mi = 1.609 km; 1.000 km = 0.621 mi
