= Georgia State Route 103 =

State highway in Georgia, United States

State Route 103
- SR 103 highlighted in red

Route information
- Maintained by GDOT
- Length: 13.94 mi (22.43 km)
- Existed: 1932–present

Major junctions
- South end: SR 116 / SR 219 northwest of Mulberry Grove
- North end: SR 18 in West Point

Location
- Country: United States
- State: Georgia
- Counties: Harris, Troup

Highway system
- Georgia State Highway System; Interstate; US; State; Special
← SR 102	→ SR 104

State Route 103 (SR 103) is a 13.94-mile-long (22.43 km) state highway in the west-central part of the U.S. state of Georgia. The highway travels from a point northwest of Mulberry Grove northwest to West Point. The highway used to travel through Muscogee, Chattahoochee, and Marion counties, but was truncated through Fort Benning. Its former path was redesignated as parts of SR 137 Spur, SR 357 and SR 219.

== Route description ==
SR 103 begins at an intersection with SR 219 northwest of Mulberry Grove, in Harris County. Past this intersection, the roadway continues as SR 116. SR 103 travels to the west-southwest, and then curves to the north. Just before an intersection with the southern terminus of Pine Lake Road, it begins to curve to the northwest. The highway continues to the north-northwest and enters Troup County and the city limits of West Point, where it meets its northern terminus, an intersection with SR 18.

SR 103 is not part of the National Highway System, a system of roadways important to the nation's economy, defense, and mobility.

== History ==
=== 1930s ===
The roadway that would eventually become SR 103 was built in April 1932 as an unnumbered road from Columbus east and southeast to SR 26 northwest of Buena Vista. Later that year, SR 103 was designated on this road. The Muscogee County portion had a "completed hard surface". At the end of 1934, the Chattahoochee County portion of the highway was under construction. A year later the southern terminus had a "sand clay or top soil" surface. By the middle of 1936, the Chattahoochee County portion had completed grading, but was not surfaced. Later that year, this portion had a sand clay or top soil surface. The next year, the portion from the southern terminus to the Chattahoochee–Muscogee county line had a completed hard surface. Later that year, its northern terminus was extended north-northwest to SR 18 in West Point. At the end of the year, the Muscogee County portion of this extension had a completed hard surface, and the southern part of the Harris County portion was under construction. By the middle of 1939, the southern part of the Harris County portion had completed grading, but was not surfaced.

=== 1940s and 1950s ===
Between November 1946 and February 1948, the portion from Mountain Hill to West Point had a "sand clay, top soil, or stabilized earth" surface. By April 1949, the southern part of Harris County portion was hard surfaced. By August 1950, the portion of SR 26 between Cusseta and Buena Vista was shifted southward, with SR 103 extended on the old path of SR 26 to SR 41 in Buena Vista. The southern half of the Harris County portion was hard surfaced. In 1953, SR 26 between Cusseta and Buena Vista was moved back to its previous routing, truncating SR 103 to its previous southern terminus. Between June 1955 and July 1957, the northern half of the Harris County segment had a "topsoil or gravel, unpaved" surface. The Troup County portion was hard surfaced.

=== 1960s to 1980s ===
By June 1960, the northern half of the Harris County portion was paved. By June 1963, SR 103 was truncated to the western edge of Fort Benning. Part of the old path in Marion County was redesignated as SR 137 Spur. By the end of 1966, the highway was truncated again, to the intersection of Buena Vista Road and Brennan Road. Its old path on Buena Vista Road was redesignated as part of SR 357. In 1983, the southern terminus was truncated to its current point. Its former path north of US 27/US 80/SR 1 was redesignated as a southern extension of SR 219.

== Major intersections ==
County	Location	mi	km	Destinations	Notes
Harris		0.000	0.000	SR 116 east / SR 219 to I-185	Southern terminus of SR 103; western terminus of SR 116
Troup	West Point	13.939	22.433	SR 18 to I-85 – Pine Mountain	Northern terminus
1.000 mi = 1.609 km; 1.000 km = 0.621 mi

== Columbus spur route ==
State Route 103 Spur
- Location: Columbus
- Length: 2.59 mi (4.17 km)
- Existed: 1965–1983

State Route 103 Spur (SR 103 Spur) was a spur route of SR 103 that existed entirely within Muscogee County and the city limits of Columbus, when the SR 103 mainline formerly traveled through the Columbus area. Between June 1963 and the end of 1965, SR 103 Spur was established on Cusseta Road and Brown Avenue, between intersections with SR 357 (Fort Benning Road/Brennan Road) and SR 103 (Buena Vista Road). In 1983, the spur route was decommissioned.

The entire route was in Columbus, Muscogee County.

mi	km	Destinations	Notes
0.000	0.000	SR 357 (Fort Benning Road / Brennan Road)	Southern terminus
2.591	4.170	SR 103 (Buena Vista Road)	Northern terminus
1.000 mi = 1.609 km; 1.000 km = 0.621 mi
