= Georgia State Route 41 =

State highway in Georgia, United States

State Route 41
- SR 41 highlighted in red

Route information
- Maintained by GDOT
- Length: 134.5 mi (216.5 km)
- Existed: 1920–present

Major junctions
- South end: SR 45 north of Morgan
- US 82 / SR 50 in Shellman; SR 520 in Weston; US 280 / SR 27 in Preston; US 80 / SR 22 / SR 540 southwest of Geneva; US 80 / SR 22 / SR 90 / SR 208 / SR 540 in Talbotton; US 27 Alt. / SR 85 Alt. south of Manchester
- North end: US 27 Alt. / US 29 / SR 14 in Moreland

Location
- Country: United States
- State: Georgia
- Counties: Calhoun, Randolph, Terrell, Webster, Marion, Talbot, Meriwether, Coweta

Highway system
- Georgia State Highway System; Interstate; US; State; Special
← US 41	→ SR 42

State Route 41 (SR 41) is a 134.5-mile-long (216.5 km) state highway that runs south-to-north through portions of Calhoun, Randolph, Terrell, Webster, Marion, Talbot, Meriwether, and Coweta counties in the southwestern and west-central parts of the U.S. state of Georgia. The route connects the Morgan area to Moreland, via Buena Vista, Manchester, Warm Springs, and Greenville.

== Route description ==
SR 41 begins at an intersection with SR 45 (North Bermuda Street) just north of Morgan, in Calhoun County. The route travels through rural areas of the county before it very briefly runs along the Calhoun–Randolph county line. Then, it enters Randolph County proper. It continues to the north and enters Shellman. On the far northeastern edge of town, it begins a brief concurrency with US 82/SR 50. At the end of the concurrency, the three highways reach the Randolph–Terrell county line. When SR 41 splits off, it runs along the county line for about 1.5 miles (2.4 km). Then, it travels to the northwest and curves to the north-northeast before entering Webster County. In Weston, it intersects SR 520. Northeast, in Preston, is a one-block concurrency with US 280/SR 27 (Hamilton Street). Just before leaving town, it meets the southern terminus of SR 153. The road heads north-northwest, traveling very briefly along the Webster–Marion county line. Then, it curves to the north-northeast and meets the western terminus of SR 30 before it curves back to the north-northwest. Just before entering Buena Vista, it passes by Marion County Airport. In town, the highway intersects SR 26 (6th Avenue). Three blocks later, it intersects SR 137 (3rd Avenue). The two routes run concurrent to the west. One block later, at Baker Street, SR 41/SR 137 turn to the north after meeting the northern terminus of SR 41 Connector. Just over 1,000 feet (300 m) later, the two routes head to the west-northwest and curve to the northwest. Just outside town, the two highways diverge, with SR 41 gradually curve more to the north and meets the southern terminus of SR 352 along the way. It heads due north, passing Melton Lake. Then, it begins a gradual curve to the northwest, meeting the western terminus of SR 127 and the southern terminus of SR 267 along the way. After that, it curves to the due north and crosses over Juniper Creek into Talbot County. SR 41 joins US 80/SR 22/SR 540 in a concurrency to Geneva. At the meeting point of the western terminus of SR 96, US 80/SR 22/SR 41 turn to the left. The concurrency continues into Talbotton. They intersect SR 90/SR 208 (Clark Street). The latter route joins the concurrency until Monroe Street. Just over four blocks later, SR 41 departs to the north on Washington Avenue and then crosses over Lazer Creek. Farther to the north, in Greens Mill, SR 36 begins a concurrency to the north-northeast. The two routes enter Woodland, where SR 36 splits off onto 1st Street. SR 41 curves to the west-northwest and meets the eastern terminus of SR 116 before traveling to the northwest. Just before entering Manchester, US 27 Alternate/SR 85 begin a concurrency with it. US 27 Alternate and SR 41 are concurrent for the remainder of SR 41's length. Then, they cross into Meriwether County. At 2nd Street, US 27 Alternate/SR 41 turn to the left, while SR 85 continues to the northeast. Then, at 5th Avenue, the two routes turn right. The concurrency curves to the northwest and meet the western terminus of SR 85 Spur (Perry Street). On the northwestern edge of town, they meet the southern terminus of SR 173 (Raleigh Road). They continue to the northwest and enter Warm Springs, where they intersect SR 85 Alternate (Whitehouse Highway). Just before leaving town, they pass Warm Springs Medical Center. Right after passing the Roosevelt Memorial Golf Course, they meet the eastern terminus of SR 194 (Durand Highway). They head north and pass Brae-Tam Lake and Roosevelt Memorial Airport. In Harris City, the two highways pass Phillips Lake and intersect SR 18, which joins the concurrency. In Greenville, they intersect SR 109, which joins the concurrency around the town square. Here, SR 18 splits off to the east. US 27 Alternate/SR 41 continue to the north-northwest and pass through rural areas of the county and enter Luthersville. In town, they meet the southern terminus of SR 54 Spur (Park Street). Less than 500 feet (150 m) later, they intersect SR 54 (Oak Street). Just under 1 mile (1.6 km) after leaving town, they enter Coweta County. The two routes pass through rural areas of the county and intersect US 29/SR 14 on the southeastern edge of Moreland. At this intersection, SR 41 meets its northern terminus, while the other three routes continue to the north-northwest into Newnan.

The following portions of SR 41 are part of the National Highway System, a system of routes determined to be the most important for the nation's economy, mobility, and defense

- The entire length of the concurrency with US 82/SR 50 from the far northern part of Shellman to a point northeast of the city
- The entire length of the US 280/SR 27 concurrency in Preston

== History ==
=== 1920s ===
SR 41 is one of the original state highways and was part of the system as early as 1920, when the highway ran from Moreland to Talbotton. By 1921, the state had extended the highway's southern terminus to Buena Vista. Throughout the 1920s, the highway was listed as entirely dirt/gravel.

=== 1930s ===
On the 1930 highway map, SR 41 was paved from Moreland to Manchester. The section south of Manchester to Buena Vista was listed as "unimproved, but maintained," with a small section around Geneva being rated as sand/clay topsoil road. The last available highway map of the 1930s dates to May 1932, which indicates the same road paving/unpaving conditions as the 1930 map.

=== 1940s ===
By 1940, SR 41's southern terminus had been extended to Preston and onto Cuthbert. The road was hard paved from Manchester to Talbotton. The section from Talbotton to south of Geneva was listed as "graded, but unsurfaced," before paving started again approximately 10 miles north of Buena Vista. The section from south of Buena Vista to Cuthbert was listed as unimproved but maintained. The last available highway map dates to January 1942 and shows the southern terminus extended to Morgan with the same road surface as 1940.

=== 1950s ===
The 1950s saw changes to the highway both in terms of paving and also routing. SR 41 was shifted further eastward from Preston to Morgan. In the 1940s, the road routed travelers from Preston to Cuthbert and then onto Morgan. By 1950, the road was realigned away from Cuthbert and ran from Preston to Weston and then directly to Morgan.

The 1950 map also reveals that SR 41 from Moreland to Geneva was listed as a primary state highway, while the route south of Geneva was a secondary state highway system. The route was entirely paved from Moreland to Buena Vista. The section from Buena Vista to Preston was unpaved, with the section between Preston and Weston paved. The road was unpaved from Weston to Morgan. By 1957, the entire route was paved and listed as a primary state route for its entirety. The route has remained largely unchanged since the late 1950s.

== Major intersections ==
County	Location	mi	km	Destinations	Notes
Calhoun		0.0	0.0	SR 45 (North Bermuda Street) – Morgan, Dawson	Southern terminus
Calhoun–Randolph	No major junctions				
Randolph	Shellman	15.4	24.8	US 82 west / SR 50 west (Broad Street/Pearl Street)	Southern end of US 82/SR 50 concurrency
Randolph–Terrell county line		16.3	26.2	US 82 east / SR 50 east (Graves Highway)	Northern end of US 82/SR 50 concurrency
Randolph	No major junctions				
Webster	Weston	32.0	51.5	SR 520 – Parrott, Richland	
Webster	Preston	40.1	64.5	US 280 west / SR 27 west (Hamilton Street)	Southern end of US 280/SR 27 concurrency
Webster	Preston	40.2	64.7	US 280 east / SR 27 east (Hamilton Street)	Northern end of US 280/SR 27 concurrency
Webster	Preston	40.8	65.7	SR 153 north – Ellaville	Southern terminus of SR 153
Webster–Marion	No major junctions				
Marion		52.7	84.8	SR 30 east – Americus	Western terminus of SR 30
Marion	Buena Vista	59.4	95.6	SR 26 (6th Avenue) – Cusseta, Ellaville	
Marion	Buena Vista	59.6	95.9	SR 137 north (3rd Avenue) – Butler	Southern end of SR 137 concurrency
Marion	Buena Vista	59.7	96.1	SR 41 Conn. south (Baker Street)	Northern terminus of SR 41 Connector
Marion		60.7	97.7	SR 137 south	Northern end of SR 137 concurrency
Marion		63.3	101.9	SR 352 north	Southern terminus of SR 352
Marion		68.7	110.6	SR 127 east	Western terminus of SR 127
Marion		72.3	116.4	SR 267 north (Dr. Brooks Drive)	Southern terminus of SR 267
Juniper Creek		74.9	120.5	Unnamed bridge; crossing over Juniper Creek, marking the Marion–Talbot county line	
Talbot		78.1	125.7	US 80 west / SR 22 west / SR 540 west – Columbus	Southern end of US 80/SR 22 and SR 540 concurrencies
Talbot	Geneva	78.9	127.0	SR 96 east / SR 540 east – Junction City	Northern end of SR 540 concurrency; western terminus of SR 96
Talbot	Talbotton	86.2	138.7	SR 90 east / SR 208 east (Clark Street) – Junction City	Southern end of SR 208 concurrency; western terminus of SR 90
Talbot	Talbotton	86.4	139.0	SR 208 west (Monroe Street) – Waverly Hall	Northern end of SR 208 concurrency
Talbot	Talbotton	86.6	139.4	US 80 east / SR 22 east (George W. Towns Avenue)	Northern end of US 80/SR 22 concurrency
Talbot	Greens Mill	92.6	149.0	SR 36 west – Waverly Hall	Southern end of SR 36 concurrency
Talbot	Woodland	94.4	151.9	SR 36 east (1st Street) – Thomaston	Northern end of SR 36 concurrency
Talbot		96.2	154.8	SR 116 west	Eastern terminus of SR 116
Talbot		99.9	160.8	US 27 Alt. south / SR 85 south	Southern end of US 27 Alternate & SR 85 concurrencies
Meriwether	Manchester	100.3	161.4	SR 190 west (Pine Mountain Highway) – Little White House	Eastern terminus of SR 190
Meriwether	Manchester	100.8	162.2	SR 85 north (Broad Street) – Woodbury	Northern end of SR 85 concurrency
Meriwether	Manchester	101.7	163.7	SR 85 Spur east (Perry Street)	Western terminus of SR 85 Spur
Meriwether	Manchester	102.8	165.4	SR 173 north (Raleigh Road)	Southern terminus of SR 173
Meriwether	Warm Springs	106.1	170.8	SR 85 Alt. (Whitehouse Parkway) – Shiloh, Woodbury	
Meriwether		106.8	171.9	SR 194 west (Durand Highway) – Durand	Eastern terminus of SR 194
Meriwether	Harris City	112.3	180.7	SR 18 west (Chipley Highway) – Durand	Southern end of SR 18 concurrency
Meriwether	Greenville	116.5	187.5	SR 109 west – LaGrange	Southern end of SR 109 concurrency around the city square
Meriwether	Greenville	116.5	187.5	SR 109 east – Woodbury	Northern end of SR 109 concurrency around the city square
Meriwether	Greenville	116.5	187.5	SR 109 west – LaGrange	Southern end of SR 109 concurrency around the city square
Meriwether		118.4	190.5	SR 362 north (Callaway Road) – Williamson	Southern terminus of SR 362
Meriwether	Luthersville	129.4	208.2	SR 54 Spur north (Park Street)	Southern terminus of SR 54 Spur
Meriwether	Luthersville	129.6	208.6	SR 54 (Oak Street) – Hogansville, Sharpsburg	
Coweta	Moreland	134.5	216.5	US 27 Alt. north / US 29 / SR 14	Northern terminus; northern end of US 27 Alternate concurrency
1.000 mi = 1.609 km; 1.000 km = 0.621 mi: Concurrency terminus

== Buena Vista connector route ==
State Route 41 Connector
- Location: Buena Vista
- Length: 0.2 mi (320 m)

State Route 41 Connector (SR 41 Connector) is a 0.2-mile-long (0.32 km) connector route that exists entirely within the central part of Marion County. Its routing is completely within the city limits of Buena Vista.

It begins at an intersection with SR 26, one block west of the SR 41 mainline. The highway heads nearly due north until it meets its northern terminus, an intersection with SR 41/SR 137.

SR 41 Connector is not part of the National Highway System, a system of roadways important to the nation's economy, defense, and mobility.

The entire route is in Buena Vista, Marion County.

mi	km	Destinations	Notes
0.0	0.0	SR 26 (6th Avenue/Broad Street) – Cusseta, Ellaville	Southern terminus
0.2	0.32	SR 41 / SR 137 (Baker Street/3rd Avenue) – Geneva, Butler, Preston	Northern terminus
1.000 mi = 1.609 km; 1.000 km = 0.621 mi
