= Georgia State Route 194 =

State highway in Georgia, United States

State Route 194
- Durand Highway
- SR 194 highlighted in red

Route information
- Maintained by GDOT
- Length: 5.33 mi (8.58 km)

Major junctions
- West end: SR 18 in Durand
- East end: US 27 Alt. / SR 41 west of Warm Springs

Location
- Country: United States
- State: Georgia
- Counties: Meriwether

Highway system
- Georgia State Highway System; Interstate; US; State; Special
← SR 193	→ SR 195

State Route 194 (SR 194) is a short 5.33-mile (8.58 km) state highway in the west-central part of the U.S. state of Georgia. It runs west-to-east entirely within Meriwether County.

== Route description ==
The route begins at an intersection with SR 18 in the community of Durand. It curves to the southeast until it meets its eastern terminus, an intersection with US 27 Alternate/SR 41 west of Warm Springs.

== Major intersections ==
The entire route is in Meriwether County.

Location	mi	km	Destinations	Notes
Durand	0.00	0.00	SR 18 (Chipley Highway) – Pine Mountain, Greenville	Western terminus
	5.33	8.58	US 27 Alt. / SR 41 (Roosevelt Highway) – Warm Springs, Greenville	Eastern terminus
1.000 mi = 1.609 km; 1.000 km = 0.621 mi
