= Georgia State Route 137 =

State highway in Georgia, United States

State Route 137
- Georgia State Route 137 highlighted in red

Route information
- Maintained by GDOT
- Length: 48.1 mi (77.4 km)

Major junctions
- Southwest end: SR 355 near Buena Vista
- SR 96 / SR 540 in Butler; US 19 / SR 3 in Butler
- Northeast end: SR 128 southwest of Roberta

Location
- Country: United States
- State: Georgia
- Counties: Marion, Taylor

Highway system
- Georgia State Highway System; Interstate; US; State; Special
← SR 136	→ SR 138

State Route 137 (SR 137) is a 55.5-mile-long (89.3 km) southwest-to-northeast state highway in the west-central part of the U.S. state of Georgia. The highway travels from an SR 355 in an unincorporated part of Marion County to the west of Buena Vista to Butler. It begins near the southeastern portion of Fort Benning. Its routing exists within portions Marion and Taylor counties.

== Route description ==
SR 137 begins within Marion County, at an intersection with SR 355. Just short of two miles from its origin, the route passes SR 137 Spur. Just northwest of Buena Vista is an intersection with SR 41. The two routes head southeast into town and split, with SR 41 heading south and SR 137 heading east and then northeast. SR 137 travels through rural areas of the county and has a very brief concurrency with SR 240 in Tazewell. In the northeast, it enters Taylor County and crosses just northwest of the Taylor–Schley county line. Less than 2 miles (3.2 km) later is SR 90/SR 127. The three highways have a brief concurrency to the north, until SR 137 splits off to the northeast. Just southwest of Butler the route meets SR 96/SR 540 at a reduced conflict intersection where through traffic on SR 137 must briefly travel on the divided highway before turning around to and exiting the highway to the right. Within the city of Butler, it passes just south of Butler Municipal Airport and then meets US 19/SR 3. After exiting the city, SR 137 continues to the northeast until it reaches its eastern terminus, an intersection with SR 128, just south of the Flint River.

SR 137 is not part of the National Highway System, a system of roadways important to the nation's economy, defense, and mobility.

== Major intersections ==
County	Location	mi	km	Destinations	Notes
Marion		0	0.0	SR 355 – Juniper, Cusseta	Western terminus
Marion		1.8	2.9	SR 137 Spur north (Old Columbus Road)	Southern terminus of SR 137 Spur
Marion		8.1	13.0	SR 41 north – Geneva	Western end of SR 41 concurrency
Marion	Buena Vista	9.2	14.8	SR 41 south (Baker Street) – Preston	Eastern end of SR 41 concurrency
Marion	Tazewell	15.9	25.6	SR 240 north (Ronnie Road) – Geneva	Western end of SR 240 concurrency
Marion	Tazewell	15.9	25.6	SR 240 south	Eastern end of SR 240 concurrency
Taylor		22.2	35.7	SR 90 east / SR 127 east	Western end of SR 90/SR 127 concurrency
Taylor		23.9	38.5	SR 90 west / SR 127 west	Eastern end of SR 90/SR 127 concurrency
Taylor		32.3	52.0	SR 96 / SR 540 – Junction City, Reynolds, Macon, Columbus	Reduced conflict intersection
Taylor	Butler	33.8	54.4	US 19 south / SR 3 south (Poplar Street)	Southbound lanes of a one-way pair
Taylor	Butler	33.8	54.4	US 19 north / SR 3 north (Broad Street)	Northbound lanes of a one-way pair
Taylor		42.7	68.7	SR 208 west (East Old Wire Road) – Talbotton	Eastern terminus of SR 208
Taylor		48.1	77.4	SR 128 – Reynolds, Roberta	Eastern terminus
1.000 mi = 1.609 km; 1.000 km = 0.621 mi: Concurrency terminus

== Marion County spur route ==
State Route 137 Spur
- Location: Marion County
- Length: 1.6 mi (2.6 km)
- Existed: 1963–present

State Route 137 Spur (SR 137 Spur) is a 1.6-mile-long (2.6 km) spur route that exists entirely within the southwestern part of Marion County.

It begins at an intersection with the SR 137 mainline and heads northwest until it meets its northern terminus, an intersection with SR 355 mainline, southeast of Fort Benning.

SR 137 Spur is not part of the National Highway System, a system of roadways important to the nation's economy, defense, and mobility.

The roadway that would eventually become SR 137 Spur was established in April 1932 as an unnumbered road from Columbus to Buena Vista. Later that year, SR 103 was designated on this road. In 1937, the current path of SR 137 Spur had a "completed hard surface". Between June 1960 and June 1963, SR 103 was truncated west of Fort Benning. Part of its former path through Marion County was redesignated as SR 137 Spur.

The entire route is in Marion County.

Location	mi	km	Destinations	Notes
	0.0	0.0	SR 137 – Cusseta, Buena Vista	Southern terminus
	1.6	2.6	SR 355 – Juniper	Northern terminus
1.000 mi = 1.609 km; 1.000 km = 0.621 mi
