= U.S. Route 80 in Georgia =

Highway in Georgia

U.S. Highway 80
- US 80 highlighted in red

Route information
- Maintained by GDOT
- Length: 296.47 mi (477.12 km)

Major junctions
- West end: US 80 / SR 8 / SR 22 / SR 540 at the Alabama state line in Columbus
- I-185 in Columbus; US 27 / SR 1 in Columbus; I-475 in Macon; I-75 / SR 540 in Macon; US 23 / US 41 / US 129 / SR 540 in Macon; US 319 / US 441 / SR 29 / SR 31 in Dublin; US 1 / SR 4 / SR 57 near Swainsboro; US 25 / US 301 / SR 67 / SR 73 in Statesboro; I-95 in Pooler; I-16 / US 17 in Savannah
- East end: SR 26/ Tybrisa Street/Butler Avenue/Inlet Avenue in Tybee Island

Location
- Country: United States
- State: Georgia
- Counties: Muscogee, Talbot, Taylor, Upson, Crawford, Bibb, Twiggs, Wilkinson, Laurens, Johnson, Emanuel, Bulloch, Bryan, Effingham, Chatham

Highway system
- United States Numbered Highway System; List; Special; Divided; Georgia State Highway System; Interstate; US; State; Special
← SR 79	→ SR 80

U.S. Route 80 (US 80) is a 296.47-mile-long (477.12 km) U.S. Highway in the U.S. state of Georgia. It travels west-to-east from the Alabama state line in Columbus across the central portion of the state through cities such as Macon, Dublin, Statesboro, and Savannah to connect to its eastern terminus at an intersection with Tybrisa Street and Inlet Avenue in Tybee Island, near the Atlantic Ocean. Here, the roadway continues as Butler Avenue. US-80 is the main east-west non-Interstate route through Georgia.

In Georgia, all U.S. Highways have at least one state highway that travel concurrently along its route. The main ones that US 80 use are SR 540 from the Alabama state line to Geneva and in the eastern part of the Macon metropolitan area; SR 22 from the Alabama state line to Macon; SR 19 from Macon to a point southeast of Montrose; and SR 26 from that point to Tybee Island. From Macon to its Savannah, US 80 roughly parallels I-16, taking a more circuitous route to pass through the center several small towns that I-16 bypasses.

== Route description ==
The highway crosses the Chattahoochee River from Alabama into Columbus where it proceeds along J. R. Allen Parkway through the northern section of the city as a limited-access freeway. Past Columbus, the road meanders through rural Georgia for roughly 50 miles (80 km) en route to Macon where it becomes the Eisenhower Parkway, so named in 1969 after the death of Dwight Eisenhower, and crosses Interstate 475 (I-475) and then I-75 before traveling through downtown Macon and merging with US 129/US 41 Bus. in a concurrency. The concurrency with US 41 Bus. ends at Walnut Street, and the one with US 129 ends at Riverside Drive. After crossing the Otis Redding Memorial Bridge over the Ocmulgee River, it has another interchange, this time with I-16. The highway joins southbound US 23/US 129 Alt. and parallels the northern boundary of Ocmulgee Mounds National Historical Park just east of the city.

Beyond Macon, the highway turns southeastward, traveling through the cities of Dublin, where it encircles the Laurens County Courthouse. Before the highway leaves Dublin, it is joined by US 319/SR 31, where all four highways cross the Herschel Lovett Bridge over the Oconee River, entering East Dublin, where US 319/SR 31 leaves to the northeast. Later it enters Swainsboro, where it is concurrent with SR 56, and Statesboro where it is concurrent with US 25, and traveling roughly parallel to I-16. On the outskirts of Savannah, the highway crosses I-95 and follows Louisville Road into the city's downtown area. After briefly merging with I-516, US 80 continues eastward along Victory Drive, just south of Savannah's historic district. At the community of Thunderbolt, where Victory Drive ends, US 80 crosses the Wilmington River and proceeds across the islands and marshes along the Atlantic Coast east of Savannah. There it crosses Lazaretto Creek onto Tybee Island. The final stretch of US 80 follows Butler Avenue across Tybee Island. A small monument at the intersection of Butler and Tybrisa Street marks the end of the highway.

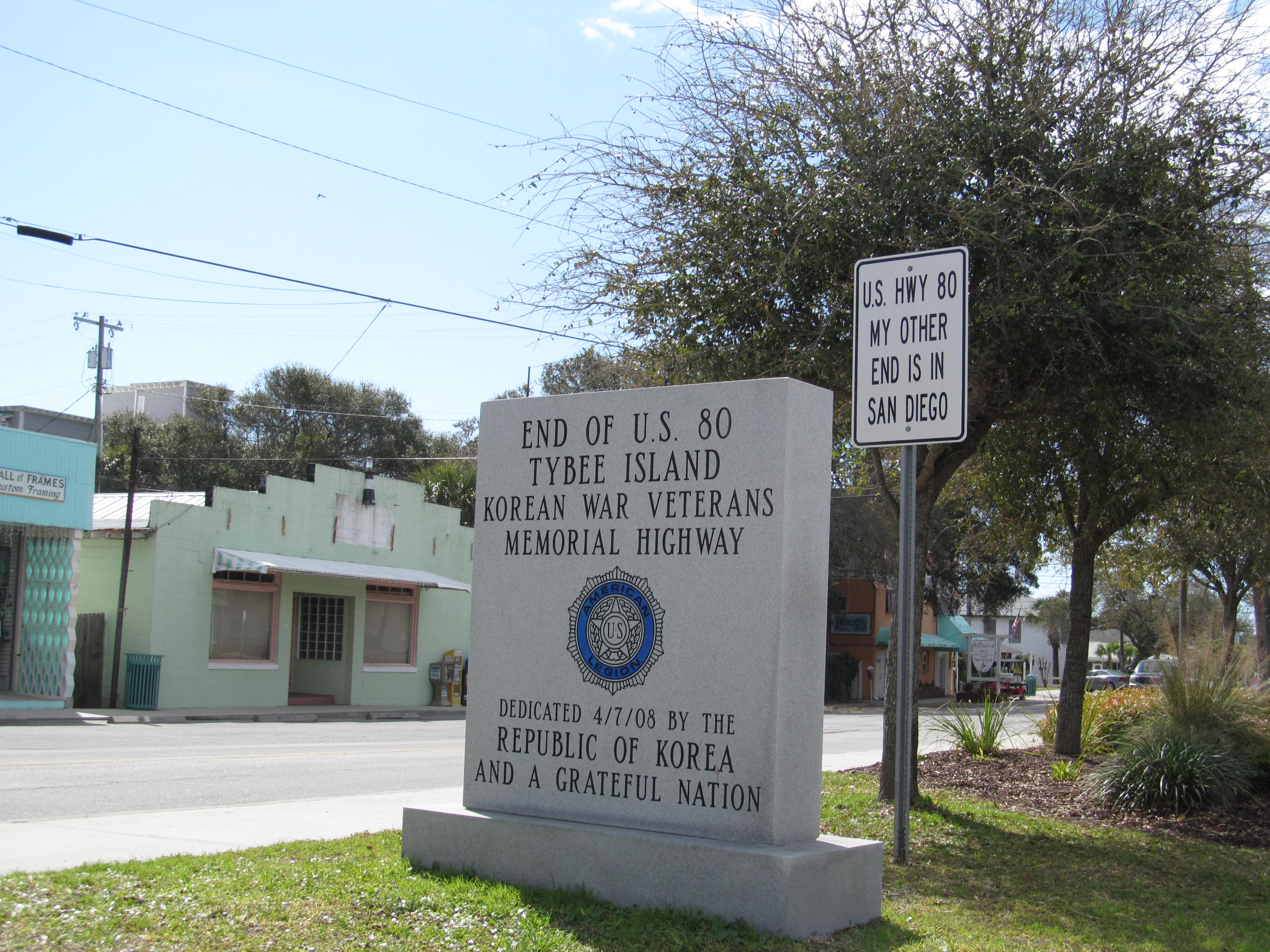
Monument at the eastern terminus of US 80 on Tybee Island. The sign on the right references the highway's former western terminus in San Diego, CA.

The following portions of US 80 in Georgia are part of the National Highway System, a system of routes determined to be the most important for the nation's economy, mobility, and defense:

- From the Alabama state line to the SR 96 intersection in Geneva
- From the I-475 interchange to the southern end of the US 129 concurrency in Macon
- From the northern end of the US 129 concurrency in Macon to the SR 57 intersection in East Macon
- The portion between US 441 Byp./SR 117 and US 441/SR 29 in Dublin
- From the western end of the US 25/SR 67 concurrency in Hopeulikit to the US 301 Byp./SR 73 Byp. intersection in Statesboro
- From the I-95 interchange in Pooler to an indeterminate point in Tybee Island.

== History ==
In 2017, it was planned to extended Jimmy DeLoach Parkway from its then southern terminus at US 80/SR 17/SR 26, partially along the path of Bloomingdale Road (from SR 17's current southern terminus at I-16 to just south of its intersection with the northern terminus of Pine Barren Road). Construction on the extension began in 2018. The at-grade intersection at the former southern terminus of the Jimmy DeLoach Parkway was converted into a full diamond interchange. The extension of the parkway was planned to be designated as SR 1251 until it is opened. The former alignment of SR 17 was also planned to be redesignated as SR 17 Conn. Also, the eastern end of Osteen Road, which lies on the right-of-way of the extension, was to be shifted to the west. After initially being expected to completed October 2021, the extension was officially opened on August 30, 2022.

== Future ==
Part of US 80 from the Alabama state line to Geneva, Georgia is part of the Fall Line Freeway, a highway that connects Columbus and Augusta. This portion may eventually be incorporated into the proposed eastern extension of Interstate 14 (I-14), which is currently entirely within Central Texas and may be extended into Augusta.

== Major intersections ==
County	Location	mi	km	Exit	Destinations	Notes
Chattahoochee River		0.000	0.000		US 80 west (SR 8 west) / SR 22 begins / SR 540 begins – Phenix City, Montgomery	Continuation into Alabama; western end of SR 22 and SR 540 concurrencies; western terminus of SR 22 and SR 540
Muscogee	Columbus	0.613	0.987	1	SR 22 Conn. to SR 85 – Downtown Columbus	Northern terminus of SR 22 Conn.
Muscogee	Columbus	1.310	2.108	2	SR 219 (River Road)	
Muscogee	Columbus	2.488	4.004	3	Bradley Park Drive	Diverging diamond interchange
Muscogee	Columbus	3.780	6.083	4	I-185 (SR 411) / US 27 / SR 1 (Veterans Parkway) – Fort Benning, Atlanta	I-185 exit 10
Muscogee	Columbus	5.885	9.471	5	Moon Road	Eastbound exit is combined with exit 4; also has exit for US 27/SR 1 (Veterans Parkway)
Muscogee	Columbus	7.124	11.465	6	Schomburg Road / Blackmon Road	
Muscogee	Midland	9.452	15.212		Flat Rock Road	At-grade intersection; eastern end of freeway
Muscogee	Midland	9.812	15.791		US 27 Alt. / SR 85 – Manchester, Columbus	Interchange
Muscogee	Midland	11.367	18.293		SR 22 Spur west (Macon Road)	Eastern terminus of SR 22 Spur
Talbot	Box Springs	26.161	42.102		SR 355 south – Buena Vista, Cusseta	Northern terminus of SR 355
Talbot	Geneva	28.881	46.479		SR 41 south – Buena Vista, Oakland	Western end of SR 41 concurrency
Talbot	Geneva	29.691	47.783		SR 96 begins / SR 540 east (Fall Line Freeway) to SR 240 east – Junction City	Western terminus of SR 96; eastern end of SR 540 concurrency
Talbot	Talbotton	36.926	59.427		SR 90 begins / SR 208 east (Clark Street) – Junction City	Western end of SR 208 concurrency; western terminus of SR 90
Talbot	Talbotton	37.129	59.753		SR 208 west (Monroe Street) – Waverly Hall	Eastern end of SR 208 concurrency
Talbot	Talbotton	37.358	60.122		SR 41 north (North Washington Avenue) – Manchester, Warm Springs, Woodland	Eastern end of SR 41 concurrency
Taylor		56.102	90.287		US 19 south / SR 3 south – Butler, Americus	Western end of US 19/SR 3 concurrency
Flint River		56.759	91.345	Garland T. Byrd Bridge		
Upson	Salem	58.177	93.627		US 19 north / SR 3 north – Thomaston	Eastern end of US 19/SR 3 concurrency
Crawford	Roberta	71.480	115.036		US 341 / SR 7 / SR 42 north – Barnesville, Fort Valley	Western end of SR 42 concurrency
Crawford	Knoxville	72.467	116.624		SR 42 south – Byron	Eastern end of SR 42 concurrency
Bibb		88.897	143.066		Fulton Mill Road – Central State Prison, Ed DeFore Sports Complex	Former SR 361
Bibb	Macon	90.654	145.893		I-475 (SR 408) – Atlanta, Valdosta	I-475 exit 3
Bibb	Macon	94.436	151.980		US 41 / SR 247 (Pio Nono Avenue) – Forsyth, Warner Robins	
Bibb	Macon	94.841	152.632		I-75 (SR 401) / SR 540 (Fall Line Freeway) – Atlanta, Valdosta, Columbus	I-75 exit 162
Bibb	Macon	95.762	154.114		US 41 Bus. south / US 129 south / SR 11 south / SR 49 south (Broadway)	Western end of US 41 Bus./SR 49 and US 129/SR 11 concurrencies
Bibb	Macon	97.719	157.263		US 41 Bus. north / SR 22 east / SR 49 north (Walnut Street) – Gray, Milledgeville	Eastern end of US 41 Bus./SR 49 and SR 22 concurrencies
Bibb	Macon	97.827	157.437		US 129 north / SR 11 north / SR 87 north (Riverside Drive)	Eastern end of US 129/SR 11 concurrency; western end of SR 87 concurrency
Bibb	Macon	97.910	157.571	Otis Redding Memorial Bridge over the Ocmulgee River		
Bibb	Macon	97.991	157.701		I-16 (SR 404) / SR 540 west (Fall Line Freeway) – Atlanta, Savannah, Columbus	I-16 exit 2; western end of SR 540 concurrency
Bibb	Macon	98.607	158.693		US 23 / US 129 Alt. / SR 19 north (Emery Highway west)	Western end of US 23/US 129 Alt./SR 19 concurrency
Bibb	East Macon	100.887	162.362		US 129 Alt. south (US 23 / SR 87 south) – Cochran	Eastern end of US 23/US 129 Alt. concurrency; no westbound access to US 23/US 129 Alt./SR 87 south
Bibb	East Macon	101.211	162.883		SR 87 Conn. south (Ocmulgee E. Boulevard) – Cochran	Northern terminus of SR 87 Conn.
Bibb	East Macon	102.516	164.984		SR 57 east / SR 540 east (Fall Line Freeway) – Eulonia, Augusta	Western terminus of SR 57; eastern end of SR 540 concurrency
Twiggs	Jeffersonville	120.310	193.620		SR 96 west / SR 18 west – Geneva, West Point	Western end of SR 96 concurrency; eastern terminus of SR 18
Twiggs	Jeffersonville	120.498	193.923		SR 96 east – Irwinton	Eastern end of SR 96 concurrency
Twiggs		127.697	205.508		SR 358 west – Bonaire, Fort Valley	Eastern terminus of SR 358
Wilkinson	Allentown	130.552	210.103		SR 112 – Irwinton, Cochran	
Laurens	Montrose	134.861	217.038		SR 278 west – Cochran	Eastern terminus of SR 278
Laurens	Bender	137.762	221.706		SR 26 west – Cochran	Western end of SR 26 concurrency
Laurens	Dudley	140.524	226.151		SR 338 – Irwinton, Dexter	
Laurens		146.071	235.078		US 441 Byp. / SR 117	
Laurens	Dublin	150.633	242.420		US 441 / SR 19 south / SR 29 north	Eastern end of SR 19 concurrency; western end of SR 29 concurrency
Laurens	Dublin	150.818	242.718		US 319 south / SR 31 south – Thomasville	Western end of US 319/SR 31 concurrency
Laurens	Dublin–East Dublin line	151.356	243.584	Herschel Lovett Bridge over the Oconee River		
Laurens	East Dublin	152.699	245.745		US 319 north / SR 31 north (Wrightsville Avenue) – Wadley	Eastern end of US 319/SR 31 concurrency
Laurens	East Dublin	152.787	245.887		SR 29 south (Soperton Avenue) – Soperton	Eastern end of SR 29 concurrency
Emanuel–Johnson county line	Adrian	170.254	273.997		SR 15 / SR 78 (Poplar Street) – Wrightsville, Soperton	
Emanuel		176.958	284.786		US 221 / SR 171 – Soperton, Kite	
Emanuel		184.343	296.671		US 1 / SR 4 / SR 57 – Folkston, Augusta	
Emanuel	Swainsboro	185.635	298.751		SR 56 south – Stillmore, Wrightsville, Swainsboro Technical College, Airport	Western end of SR 56 concurrency; former SR 57 west (Kite Road)
Emanuel	Swainsboro	186.387	299.961		SR 4 Bus. (North Main Street) / US 1 Bus. – Folkston, Augusta	Former SR 57 east (South Main Street) to US 1
Emanuel	Swainsboro	186.918	300.815		SR 56 north – Augusta	Eastern end of SR 56 concurrency
Emanuel	Twin City	196.547	316.312		SR 192 (5th Avenue) – Oak Park, Summertown	
Emanuel	Twin City	197.328	317.569		SR 23 (Railroad Street) – Folkston, Augusta	
Emanuel		204.472	329.066		SR 121 – Folkston, Augusta	
Bulloch	Hopeulikit	216.008	347.631		US 25 north / SR 67 north – Millen, Magnolia Springs State Park	Western end of US 25/SR 67 concurrency
Bulloch	Westchester	220.407	354.711		US 25 Byp. south / SR 67 Byp. south (Veterans Memorial Parkway) – Claxton, Paulson Stadium	Northern terminus of US 25 Byp./SR 67 Byp.
Bulloch	Statesboro	222.533	358.132		US 25 south / SR 67 south / US 301 / SR 73 – Sylvania, Claxton	Eastern end of US 25/SR 67 concurrency
Bulloch	Statesboro	223.425	359.568		SR 24 east (East Main Street) – Oliver, Newington	Western terminus of SR 24
Bulloch	Statesboro	224.830	361.829		US 301 Byp. (Veterans Memorial Parkway / SR 73 Byp.) – Airport, MC Anderson Sports Complex	
Bulloch	Stilson	239.851	386.003		SR 119 Conn. south – Stilson	Western terminus of SR 119 Conn.
Bryan	Ellabell	247.471	398.266		SR 119 north – Springfield	Western end of SR 119 concurrency
Bryan	Ellabell	247.657	398.565		SR 119 south – Riceboro	Eastern end of SR 119 concurrency
Bryan	Blitchton	252.244	405.947		US 280 / SR 30 to I-16 – Pembroke	Eastern terminus of US 280, western end of SR 30 concurrency; former western end of US 280 concurrency
Effingham		259.133	417.034		SR 17 north / SR 30 east – Statesboro	Eastern end of SR 30 concurrency, western end of SR 17 concurrency
Chatham	Bloomingdale	261.162	420.299		SR 17 Conn. south / SR 17 south (Jimmy DeLoach Parkway) to I-16 / I-95	Eastern end of SR 17 concurrency; northern terminus of SR 17 Conn.; interchange
Chatham	Pooler	263.770	424.497		Pooler Parkway to I-16 / I-95	Interchange
Chatham	Pooler	265.664	427.545		I-95 (SR 405) – Florence, Brunswick	I-95 exit 102
Chatham	Garden City	268.537	432.168		SR 307 (Dean Forest Road) to I-16 – Port Wentworth	
Chatham	Garden City	270.808	435.823		Chatham Parkway south / Heidt Street north – Chatham County Administrative Complex	Northern terminus of Chatham Parkway; southern terminus of Heidt Street; former SR 167 south
Chatham	Garden City	271.972	437.697		SR 26 Conn. north (Bypass Road) to SR 21 north	Southern terminus of SR 26 Conn.; erroneously signed as "To SR 25 Conn." as well
Chatham	Garden City	272.129	437.949		Main Street north	Former US 17 north / SR 25 north
Chatham	Savannah	272.961	439.288		SR 25 Conn. north (Bay Street) – Downtown	Western end of SR 25 Conn. concurrency; former US 17/SR 21/SR 25 south/US 80/SR 26 east
Chatham	Savannah	273.169	439.623		SR 25 Conn. ends / I-516 west / SR 21 north / SR 25 north / Augusta Avenue east	Eastern end of SR 25 Conn. concurrency; western end of I-516/SR 21/SR 25 concurrency; eastern terminus of SR 25 Conn.; no eastbound access to I-516 west; I-516 exit 7A
Chatham	Savannah	273.849	440.717	6	Gwinnett Street – Amtrak station	Westbound exit and eastbound entrance; exit numbers follow I-516
Chatham	Savannah	274.448	441.681	5	I-16 (SR 404) / US 17 north – Macon	Western end of US 17 concurrency; I-16 exits 164A-B
Chatham	Savannah	274.820	442.280	4	Tremont Road	Westbound exit and eastbound entrance
Chatham	Savannah	275.726	443.738		I-516 east / SR 21 south (W.F. Lynes Parkway east) / US 17 south (SR 25 south / Ogeechee Road west) – Brunswick, Savannah Tech, Hunter Army Air Field	Eastern end of I-516/SR 21/SR 25 and US 17 concurrencies; I-516 exit 3
Chatham	Savannah	276.751	445.388		Stiles Avenue	Interchange; no westbound exit; former US 17 Alt./SR 25A north
Chatham	Savannah	277.809	447.090		Martin Luther King Jr. Boulevard	Former US 17S
Chatham	Savannah	277.875	447.196		Montgomery Street	Former US 17N
Chatham	Savannah	278.275	447.840		Abercorn Street	Former SR 204
Chatham	Savannah	280.124	450.816		Harry Truman Parkway	Interchange
Chatham	Whitemarsh Island	283.188	455.747		Johnny Mercer Boulevard east	Former US 80 east / SR 367 east
Chatham	Whitemarsh Island	284.310	457.553		Islands Expressway west	Partial interchange; western end of Islands Expressway
Chatham	Whitemarsh Island–Talahi Island line	285.499	459.466	Al St. Lawrence Memorial Bridge over Turner Creek; eastern end of Islands Expressway		
Chatham	Talahi Island	286.875	461.681		Johnny Mercer Boulevard west	Former US 80 west / SR 367 west
Chatham	Tybee Island	296.474	477.129		SR 26 ends / Tybrisa Street / Inlet Avenue	Eastern terminus of US 80 and SR 26; eastern end of SR 26 concurrency; road continues south as Butler Avenue
1.000 mi = 1.609 km; 1.000 km = 0.621 mi: Concurrency terminus; Incomplete access

== See also ==
U.S. Route 80
Previous state: Alabama	Georgia	Next state: Terminus
