= Georgia State Route 352 =

State highway in Georgia, United States

State Route 352
- SR 352 highlighted in red

Route information
- Maintained by GDOT
- Length: 9.8 mi (15.8 km)
- Existed: 1963–present

Major junctions
- South end: SR 41 north-northwest of Buena Vista
- North end: SR 355 south-southwest of Juniper

Location
- Country: United States
- State: Georgia
- Counties: Marion

Highway system
- Georgia State Highway System; Interstate; US; State; Special
← SR 348	→ SR 354

State Route 352 (SR 352) is a 9.8-mile-long (15.8 km) southeast-to-northwest state highway in northwestern Marion County in the west-central part of the U.S. state of Georgia. Its entire length is located just to the east of Fort Benning.

== Route description ==
SR 352 begins at an intersection with SR 41 north-northwest of Buena Vista, just to the east of Brantley. The highway travels to the northwest through generally rural parts of the county, until it meets its northern terminus, an intersection with SR 355 south-southwest of the community of Juniper.

== History ==
SR 352 was built along its current alignment between 1960 and 1963. By 1966, the entire length of road was paved.

== Major intersections ==
The entire route is in Marion County.

Location	mi	km	Destinations	Notes
	0.0	0.0	SR 41 – Buena Vista	Southern terminus
	9.8	15.8	SR 355 – Juniper	Northern terminus
1.000 mi = 1.609 km; 1.000 km = 0.621 mi
