= Georgia State Route 240 =

State highway in Georgia

State Route 240
- SR 240 highlighted in red

Route information
- Maintained by GDOT
- Length: 37.6 mi (60.5 km)
- Existed: 1946–present

Major junctions
- South end: SR 26 in Fountainville
- US 19 / SR 3 in Murrays Crossroads
- North end: SR 96 / SR 540 in Geneva

Location
- Country: United States
- State: Georgia
- Counties: Macon, Schley, Marion, Talbot

Highway system
- Georgia State Highway System; Interstate; US; State; Special
← SR 239	→ SR 241

State Route 240 (SR 240) is a 37.6-mile-long (60.5 km) southeast-northwest state highway located in the west-central part of the U.S. state of Georgia. It travels through portions of Macon, Schley, Marion, and Talbot counties.

== Route description ==
SR 240 begins at an intersection with SR 26 in Fountainville, which is west-southwest of Oglethorpe, in Macon County. The route runs north, and then curves to the west, through rural portions of the county. It enters Schley County, where it intersects US 19/SR 3 in the community of Murrays Crossroads. It then curves to the northwest, and enters Marion County. SR 240 intersects SR 137 in Tazewell. The route then curves to the northeast to an intersection with the southern terminus of its special route, SR 240 Connector. A short distance later, the route meets SR 127 in the unincorporated community of Five Points. It then heads north and gradually curves to the north-west until it enters Talbot County and meets its northern terminus, an intersection with SR 96/SR 540 in Geneva.

No section of SR 240 is part of the National Highway System.

== History ==
SR 240 was established in 1946 along an alignment from Fountainville to Tazewell. By 1960, the section from the Macon-Schley County line to Tazewell was paved. By 1963, the remainder of the original segment of the road, Fountainville to the Macon-Schley County line, was paved. Also, it was extended, and paved, all the way to Geneva.

== Major intersections ==
County	Location	mi	km	Destinations	Notes
Macon	Fountainville	0.0	0.0	SR 26 – Ellaville, Oglethorpe	Southern terminus
Schley	Murrays Crossroads	10.0	16.1	US 19 / SR 3 (North Broad Street) – Ellaville, Butler	
Marion	Tazewell	19.8	31.9	SR 137 east – Butler	Southern end of SR 137 concurrency
Marion	Tazewell	19.9	32.0	SR 137 west (Dr. Deryl Hart Road) – Buena Vista	Northern end of SR 137 concurrency
Marion		23.7	38.1	SR 240 Conn. north (Ronnie Road) – Mauk	Southern terminus of SR 240 Connector
Marion	Five Points	25.5	41.0	SR 127	
Talbot	Geneva	37.6	60.5	SR 96 / SR 540 – Columbus, Butler, Macon	Northern terminus
1.000 mi = 1.609 km; 1.000 km = 0.621 mi: Concurrency terminus

== Marion County connector route ==
State Route 240 Connector
- Location: Rural Marion County
- Length: 1.9 mi (3.1 km)

State Route 240 Connector (SR 240 Conn.) is a brief connector route that travels from its southern terminus at the SR 240 mainline, south of Five Points northward to SR 127 northeast of Five Points.

There is no section of SR 240 Conn. that is included as a part of the National Highway System, a system of routes determined to be the most important for the nation's economy, mobility and defense.

The entire route is in Marion County.

Location	mi	km	Destinations	Notes
	0.0	0.0	SR 240 – Tazewell, Geneva	Southern terminus
	1.9	3.1	SR 127 – Buena Vista, Mauk	Northern terminus
1.000 mi = 1.609 km; 1.000 km = 0.621 mi
