= Georgia State Route 355 =

State highway in Georgia, United States

State Route 355
- SR 355 highlighted in red

Route information
- Maintained by GDOT
- Length: 19.9 mi (32.0 km)
- Existed: 1963–present

Major junctions
- South end: SR 26 northwest of Glen Alta
- North end: US 80 / SR 22 / SR 540 north of Juniper

Location
- Country: United States
- State: Georgia
- Counties: Marion, Chattahoochee, and Talbot

Highway system
- Georgia State Highway System; Interstate; US; State; Special
← SR 354	→ SR 356

State Route 355 (SR 355) is a 19.9-mile-long (32.0 km) south–north state highway in the west-central part of the U.S. state of Georgia. Its route is contained within portions of Marion, Chattahoochee, and Talbot counties.

The northern segment was originally part of SR 267 and was built around 1950. By 1963, SR 355 was built along its current alignment, including the former section of SR 267.

== Route description ==
SR 355 begins at an intersection with SR 26 northwest of Glen Alta in southwestern Marion County. This intersection is just to the southeast of Fort Benning. It travels to the north, through Glen Alta, and curves to the northwest. It cuts across the southeastern corner of the base, where it travels through a brief portion of the base and Chattahoochee County, and intersects SR 137. The two routes share a brief concurrency, until they leave the base. SR 355 splits off to the northeast and intersects the northern terminus of SR 137 Spur (Old Columbus Road). The route continues winding its way to the north and intersects the northern terminus of SR 352. Just before entering Talbot County, it intersects the northern terminus of SR 267 and passes through Juniper. In Talbot County, SR 355 passes just to the west of Meadows Lake. Then, it crosses over a Norfolk Southern Railway line. It passes just to the west of Benson Lake and meets its northern terminus, an intersection with US 80/SR 22/SR 540 north of Juniper.

SR 355 is not part of the National Highway System, a system of roadways important to the nation's economy, defense, and mobility.

== History ==
The roadway that would eventually become SR 355 was built between 1949 and 1951. This roadway was part of SR 267 and included all of modern-day SR 355 from the current SR 267 intersection south of Juniper north to SR 355's northern terminus. Between 1957 and 1960, this entire roadway was paved. Between 1960 and 1963, SR 355 was built from its current southern terminus to the current SR 267 intersection. It was also designated along the former part of SR 267 north of there. In addition, SR 355 Loop was established along the Marion–Talbot county line. By 1966, all of SR 355 was paved.

== Major intersections ==
County	Location	mi	km	Destinations	Notes
Marion		0.0	0.0	SR 26 (Clarke Duncan Highway) – Buena Vista	Southern terminus
Chattahoochee		1.7	2.7	SR 137 west – Camp Darby	Southern end of SR 137 concurrency
Marion		2.4	3.9	SR 137 east – Buena Vista	Northern end of SR 137 concurrency
Marion		4.0	6.4	SR 137 Spur south – Buena Vista	Northern terminus of SR 137 Spur
Marion		12.4	20.0	SR 352 east – Buena Vista	Western terminus of SR 352
Marion		16.8	27.0	SR 267 south (Doctor Brooks Road)	Northern terminus of SR 267
Talbot		19.9	32.0	US 80 / SR 22 / SR 540 – Columbus, Geneva	Northern terminus
1.000 mi = 1.609 km; 1.000 km = 0.621 mi: Concurrency terminus

== Loop route ==
State Route 355 Loop
- Location: Juniper
- Length: 0.5 mi (800 m)
- Existed: 1963–1973

State Route 355 Loop (SR 355 Loop) was a 0.50-mile-long (0.80 km) loop route of SR 355 that existed along the Marion–Talbot county line, in the west-central part of the U.S. state of Georgia. It was essentially a bypass of Juniper.

It began at an intersection with the SR 355 mainline just southwest of Juniper, in Marion County. It followed Juniper Lane to the north-northeast over the Upatoi Creek, where it crossed into Talbot County, to the intersection with Juniper Mill Pond Road. It then followed that road until it met its northern terminus, another intersection with the SR 355 mainline, north-northeast of Juniper

SR 355 Loop was built, and paved, between 1960 and 1963 and coincided with the designation of the SR 355 mainline. It was decommissioned in 1973.

County	Location	mi	km	Destinations	Notes
Marion		0.0	0.0	SR 355 – Fort Benning	Southern terminus
Talbot		0.5	0.80	SR 355 – Geneva	Northern terminus
1.000 mi = 1.609 km; 1.000 km = 0.621 mi
