= Georgia State Route 224 =

State highway in Georgia, United States

State Route 224
- Georgia State Route 224 highlighted in red

Route information
- Maintained by GDOT
- Length: 29.3 mi (47.2 km)

Major junctions
- West end: SR 26 just east of Montezuma
- I-75 / US 41 / SR 7 / SR 127 in Perry
- East end: US 341 / SR 11 southeast of Perry

Location
- Country: United States
- State: Georgia
- Counties: Macon, Houston

Highway system
- Georgia State Highway System; Interstate; US; State; Special
← SR 223	→ SR 225

State Route 224 (SR 224) is a 29.3-mile-long (47.2 km) state highway in the central part of the U.S. state of Georgia. It runs southwest-to-northeast in an arc through portions of Macon and Houston counties.

== Route description ==
SR 224 begins at an intersection with SR 26 (Spaulding Road) just east of Montezuma. Just before entering Perry, it meets SR 127 (Marshallville Road). SR 127 begins a concurrency into town. In Perry, the two routes intersect US 41/SR 7, which join the concurrency. Immediately after that intersection is an interchange with Interstate 75 (I-75). Shortly after, SR 224 departs to the southeast, while US 41/SR 7/SR 127 head to the northeast into downtown Perry on General Courtney Hodges Boulevard. The highway heads southeast through rural areas until it meets its eastern terminus, an intersection with US 341/SR 11 (Main Street) southeast of Perry.

SR 224 is not part of the National Highway System, a system of roadways important to the nation's economy, defense, and mobility.

== Major intersections ==
County	Location	mi	km	Destinations	Notes
Macon		0.0	0.0	SR 26 (Spaulding Road) – Montezuma, Hawkinsville	Western terminus
Houston		18.2	29.3	SR 127 west (Marshallville Road) – Marshallville	Western end of SR 127 concurrency
Houston	Perry	20.3	32.7	US 41 south / SR 7 south	Western end of US 41/SR 7 concurrency
Houston	Perry	20.3	32.7	I-75 (SR 401) – Valdosta, Macon	I-75 exit 135
Houston	Perry	20.6	33.2	US 41 north / SR 7 north / SR 127 east (General Courtney Hodges Boulevard) – Macon, Kathleen	Eastern end of US 41/SR 7 and SR 127 concurrencies
Houston		29.3	47.2	US 341 / SR 11 (Main Street) – Perry, Hawkinsville	Eastern terminus
1.000 mi = 1.609 km; 1.000 km = 0.621 mi: Concurrency terminus
