= Georgia State Route 153 =

Highway in Georgia, US

State Route 153
- Preston Road
- SR 153 highlighted in red

Route information
- Maintained by GDOT
- Length: 19.1 mi (30.7 km)

Major junctions
- South end: SR 41 in Preston
- North end: SR 26 in Ellaville

Location
- Country: United States
- State: Georgia
- Counties: Webster, Marion, Sumter, and Schley

Highway system
- Georgia State Highway System; Interstate; US; State; Special
← SR 152	→ SR 154

State Route 153 (SR 153) is a state highway that runs southwest–to–northeast through portions of Webster, Marion, Sumter, and Schley counties in the west-central part of the U.S. state of Georgia. The route runs from Preston to Ellaville.

== Route description ==
SR 153 begins at an intersection with SR 41 in Preston. It heads northeast through rural Webster County, before cutting across the extreme southeast corner of Marion County. It enters Sumter County to an intersection with SR 30. The route enters Schley County, and travels through rural portions of the county. It then meets its northern terminus, an intersection with SR 26 in Ellaville.

SR 153 is not part of the National Highway System, a system of routes determined to be the most important for the nation's economy, mobility and defense.

== History ==
As of September 2009, the northern terminus of SR 153 was at US 19/SR 3 just south of Ellaville. By 2012, when a new four-lane bypass moved US 19/SR 3 east of the city, SR 153 was extended north to SR 26.

== Major intersections ==
County	Location	mi	km	Destinations	Notes
Webster	Preston	0.0	0.0	SR 41 (Cass Street) – Weston, Buena Vista	Southern terminus
Marion	No major junctions				
Sumter		9.2	14.8	SR 30 – Americus, Buena Vista	
Schley	Ellaville	19.1	30.7	SR 26 (Oglethorpe Street) – Buena Vista, Oglethorpe	Northern terminus
1.000 mi = 1.609 km; 1.000 km = 0.621 mi
