= Marion County Airport (Georgia) =

- IATA: none; ICAO: none; FAA LID: 82A

Summary
- Airport type: Public
- Owner: Marion County
- Serves: Buena Vista, Georgia
- Elevation AMSL: 682 ft (208 m)
- Coordinates: 32°16′58″N 084°30′13″W

Map
- Location of airport in Georgia

Runways
Direction	Length		Surface
Direction	ft	m	Surface
14/32	3,200	975	Asphalt

Statistics (2011)
- Aircraft operations: 1,200
- Source: Federal Aviation Administration

Marion County Airport (FAA LID: 82A) is a county-owned, public-use airport in Marion County, Georgia, United States. It is located three nautical miles (6 km) southeast of the central business district of Buena Vista, Georgia.

== Facilities and aircraft ==
Marion County Airport covers an area of 206 acres (83 ha) at an elevation of 682 feet (208 m) above mean sea level. It has one runway designated 14/32 with an asphalt surface measuring 3,200 by 75 feet (975 x 23 m).

For the 12-month period ending June 12, 2011, the airport had 1,200 general aviation aircraft operations, an average of 100 per month.

== See also ==
- List of airports in Georgia (U.S. state)
