= Henderson, Houston County, Georgia =

Unincorporated community in Georgia, U.S.

Coordinates: 32°20′29″N 83°47′22″W

Henderson is an unincorporated community in Houston County, in the U.S. state of Georgia.

== History ==
A post office called Henderson was established in 1832, and remained in operation until 1907. The community was named after Solomon H. Henderson, who engaged in Indian Trade.
