= Harris City, Georgia =

Unincorporated community in Georgia, U.S.

Coordinates: 32°58′05″N 84°42′46″W

Harris City is an unincorporated community in Meriwether County, in the U.S. state of Georgia.

== History ==
A variant name was "Harris". A post office called Harris City was established in 1890, the name was shortened to Harris in 1899, and the post office closed in 1929. The community was named for the family of congressman Henry R. Harris, the original owner of the town site.
