= Bender, Georgia =

Coordinates: 32°33′01″N 83°07′17″W

Bender is a ghost town in Laurens County, in the U.S. state of Georgia.

== History ==
A post office called Bender was established in 1891, and remained in operation until 1905. The community had a depot on the Macon, Dublin and Savannah Railroad.
