= Durand, Georgia =

- Unincorporated community
- Location within Georgia Location within the United States
- Coordinates: 32°55′01″N 84°46′26″W
- Country: United States
- State: Georgia
- County: Meriwether
- Elevation: 840 ft (260 m)
- Time zone: UTC-5 (Eastern (EST))
  - Summer (DST): UTC-4 (EDT)
- Area code: 706
- GNIS feature ID: 355578

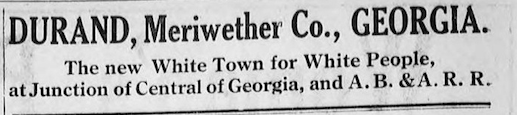

Durand is an unincorporated community in Meriwether County, Georgia, United States.

== History ==
An early variant name was "Stinson", after James W. Stinson, a pioneer citizen. The present name is after the Durand Realty Company, which promoted the town site. A post office called Stinson was established in 1883, its name was changed to Durand in 1911, and the post office closed in 1957. The Georgia General Assembly incorporated the community in 1910 as the "Town of Durand". The town's municipal charter was repealed in 1995.
