= Fountainville, Georgia =

- Unincorporated community
- Location within Georgia Location within the United States
- Coordinates: 32°17′1″N 84°9′26″W
- Country: United States
- State: Georgia
- County: Macon
- Elevation: 463 ft (141 m)
- Time zone: UTC-5 (Eastern (EST))
  - Summer (DST): UTC-4 (EDT)
- GNIS feature ID: 326292

Fountainville is an unincorporated community located in Macon County, Georgia, United States.
