= Juniper, Georgia =

- Unincorporated community
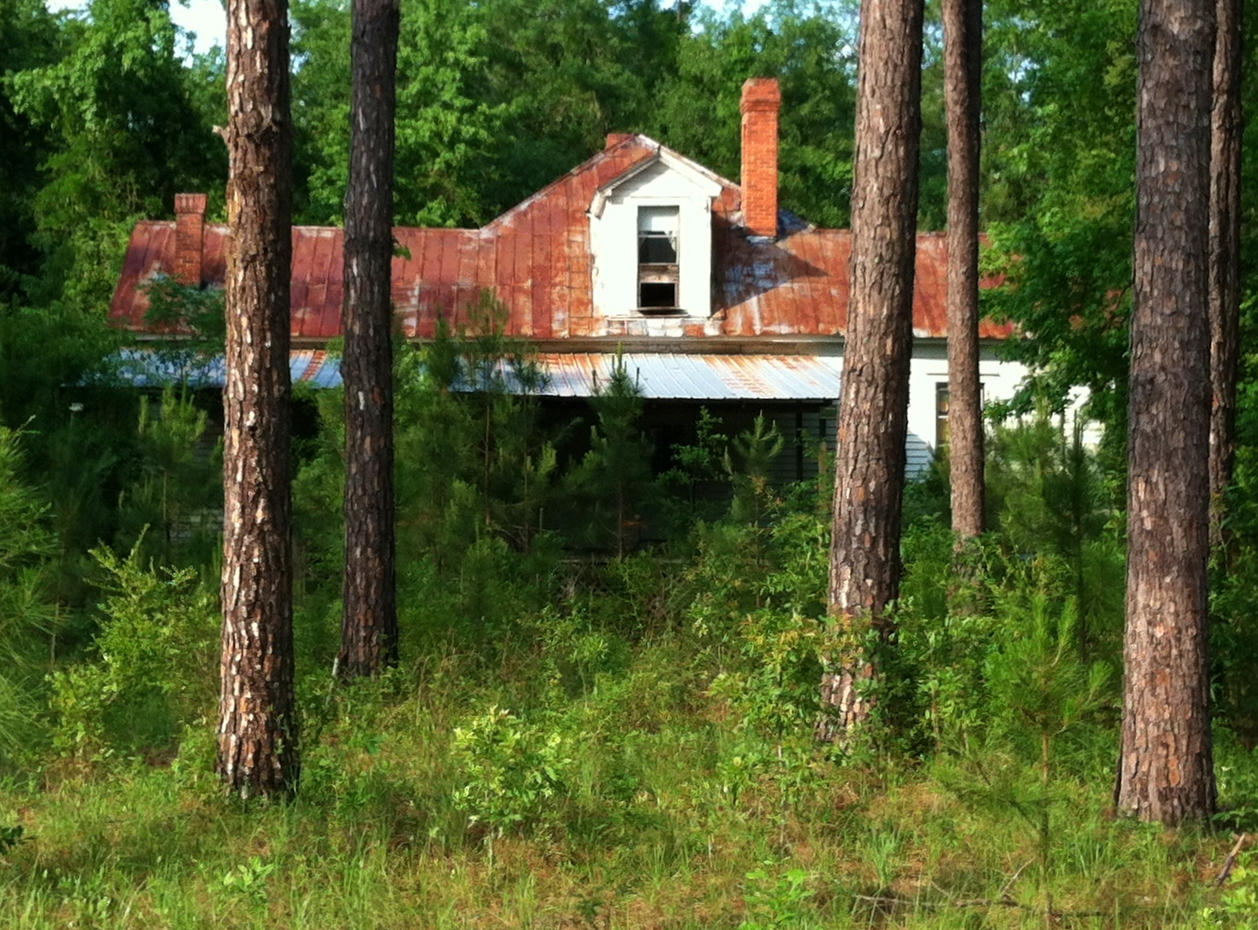
- Juniper in 2012

- Location within Georgia Location within the United States
- Coordinates: 32°31′53″N 84°36′16″W
- Country: United States
- State: Georgia
- County: Marion
- Elevation: 413 ft (126 m)
- Time zone: UTC-5 (Eastern (EST))
  - Summer (DST): UTC-4 (EDT)
- GNIS feature ID: 332126

Juniper /ˈdʒʌnɪpər/ juu-nih-pər is an unincorporated community in Marion County, Georgia, United States. It lies along State Route 355 on the Talbot County line, to the north of the city of Buena Vista, the county seat of Marion County. Its elevation is 413 feet (126 m). It is part of the Columbus, Georgia Metropolitan Area.

The community takes its name from nearby Juniper Creek.
