= Marion County, Georgia =

County in Georgia, United States

- County
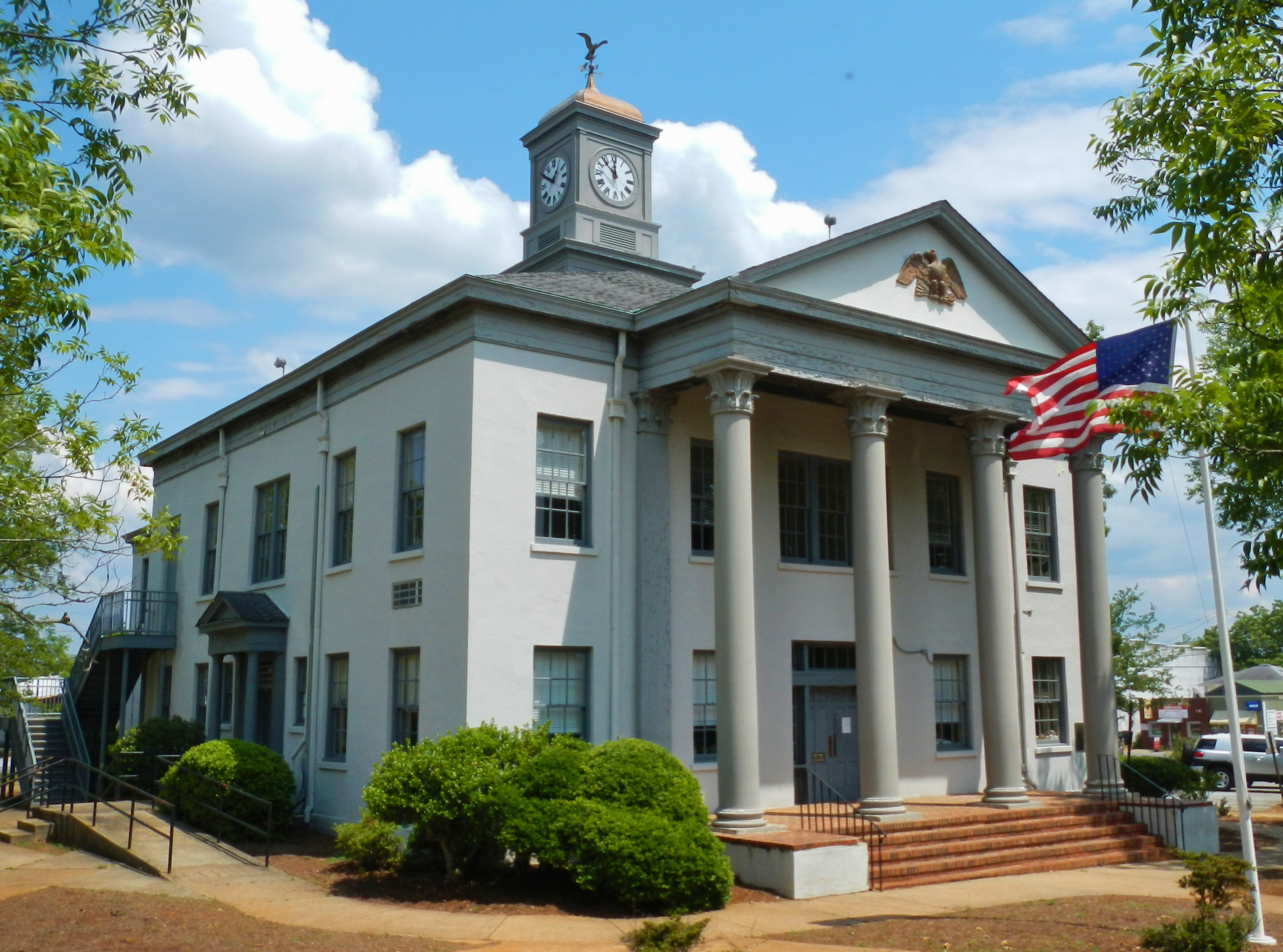
- Marion County Courthouse in Buena Vista

- Seal

- Location within the U.S. state of Georgia
- Coordinates: 32°21′N 84°32′W
- Country: United States
- State: Georgia
- Founded: December 14, 1827; 198 years ago
- Named for: Francis Marion
- Seat: Buena Vista
- Largest city: Buena Vista

Area
  - Total: 367 sq mi (950 km^{2})
  - Land: 366 sq mi (950 km^{2})
  - Water: 1.5 sq mi (3.9 km^{2})

Population (2020)
  - Total: 7,498
  - Estimate (2025): 7,676 ▲
  - Density: 20.5/sq mi (7.91/km^{2})
- Time zone: UTC−5 (Eastern)
  - Summer (DST): UTC−4 (EDT)
- Congressional district: 2nd
- Website: www.marioncountyga.org

Marion County is a county located in the west central portion of the U.S. state of Georgia. As of the 2020 census, the county had a population of 7,498. The county seat is Buena Vista. The county was created on December 14, 1827. The county was named for General Francis Marion of South Carolina.

Marion County is included in the Columbus, GA-AL metropolitan statistical area.

The art site of Pasaquan is located in Marion County.

== Geography ==
According to the U.S. Census Bureau, the county has a total area of 367 square miles (950 km^{2}), of which 366 square miles (950 km^{2}) is land and 1.5 square miles (3.9 km^{2}) (0.4%) is water.

The southern half of Marion County, roughly south of Buena Vista, is located in the Kinchafoonee-Muckalee sub-basin of the ACF River Basin (Apalachicola-Chattahoochee-Flint River Basin). The northwestern portion of the county is located in the Middle Chattahoochee River-Walter F. George Lake sub-basin of the same ACF River Basin. The majority of the northeastern portion of Marion County is located in the Middle Flint River sub-basin of the larger ACF River Basin, with just very small portions of the northeastern border, most of which is bisected by State Route 127 south of Mauk, located in the Upper Flint River sub-basin of the same larger ACF River Basin.

=== Major highways ===
- State Route 26
- State Route 30
- State Route 41
  - State Route 41 Connector
- State Route 127
- State Route 137
  - State Route 137 Spur
- State Route 153
- State Route 240
  - State Route 240 Connector
- State Route 352
- State Route 355

=== Adjacent counties ===
- Talbot County (north)
- Taylor County (northeast)
- Schley County (east)
- Sumter County (southeast)
- Webster County (south)
- Stewart County (southwest)
- Chattahoochee County (west)

== Communities ==
=== City ===
- Buena Vista (county seat)

=== Census-designated place ===
- Tazewell

=== Unincorporated communities ===
- Juniper
- Mauk

== Demographics ==
Historical population
Census	Pop.	Note	%±
1830	1,436		—
1840	4,812		235.1%
1850	10,280		113.6%
1860	7,390		−28.1%
1870	8,000		8.3%
1880	8,598		7.5%
1890	7,728		−10.1%
1900	10,080		30.4%
1910	9,147		−9.3%
1920	7,604		−16.9%
1930	6,968		−8.4%
1940	6,954		−0.2%
1950	6,521		−6.2%
1960	5,477		−16.0%
1970	5,099		−6.9%
1980	5,297		3.9%
1990	5,590		5.5%
2000	7,144		27.8%
2010	8,742		22.4%
2020	7,498		−14.2%
2025 (est.)	7,676	▲	2.4%
U.S. Decennial Census; 1790-1880 1890-1910; 1920-1930 1930-1940; 1940-1950 1960-1980; 1980-2000 2010

=== Racial and ethnic composition ===
Marion County, Georgia – Racial and ethnic composition Note: the US Census treats Hispanic/Latino as an ethnic category. This table excludes Latinos from the racial categories and assigns them to a separate category. Hispanics/Latinos may be of any race.
Race / Ethnicity (NH = Non-Hispanic)	Pop 1980	Pop 1990	Pop 2000	Pop 2010	Pop 2020	% 1980	% 1990	% 2000	% 2010	% 2020
White alone (NH)	4,379	4,852	4,182	5,100	4,486	54.42%	56.20%	58.54%	58.34%	59.83%
Black or African American alone (NH)	3,607	3,707	2,410	2,837	2,122	44.83%	42.93%	33.73%	32.45%	28.30%
Native American or Alaska Native alone (NH)	7	9	22	40	12	0.09%	0.10%	0.31%	0.46%	0.16%
Asian alone (NH)	12	3	7	77	55	0.15%	0.03%	0.10%	0.88%	0.73%
Native Hawaiian or Pacific Islander alone (NH)	x	x	7	13	15	x	x	0.10%	0.15%	0.20%
Other race alone (NH)	0	0	18	6	11	0.00%	0.00%	0.25%	0.07%	0.15%
Mixed race or Multiracial (NH)	x	x	85	99	237	x	x	1.19%	1.13%	3.16%
Hispanic or Latino (any race)	41	63	413	570	560	0.51%	0.73%	5.78%	6.52%	7.47%
Total	8,046	8,634	7,144	8,742	7,498	100.00%	100.00%	100.00%	100.00%	100.00%

=== 2020 census ===
As of the 2020 census, the county had a population of 7,498. The median age was 44.6 years. 21.9% of residents were under the age of 18 and 19.4% of residents were 65 years of age or older. For every 100 females there were 97.0 males, and for every 100 females age 18 and over there were 96.5 males age 18 and over. 0.0% of residents lived in urban areas, while 100.0% lived in rural areas.

The racial makeup of the county was 60.7% White, 28.7% Black or African American, 0.3% American Indian and Alaska Native, 0.7% Asian, 0.2% Native Hawaiian and Pacific Islander, 4.6% from some other race, and 4.7% from two or more races. Hispanic or Latino residents of any race comprised 7.5% of the population.

As of the 2020 census, there were 2,969 households and 2,396 families in the county, of which 29.8% had children under the age of 18 living with them and 28.8% had a female householder with no spouse or partner present. About 28.0% of all households were made up of individuals and 13.2% had someone living alone who was 65 years of age or older.

There were 3,497 housing units, of which 15.1% were vacant. Among occupied housing units, 71.7% were owner-occupied and 28.3% were renter-occupied. The homeowner vacancy rate was 0.9% and the rental vacancy rate was 4.8%.

== Education ==
The Marion County School District is the only school district in the county. It contains a primary school and a secondary school that serve students from preschool to grade 12.

== Politics ==
As of the 2020s, Marion County is a Republican stronghold, voting 64.84% for Donald Trump in 2024. As with most Solid South counties, Marion County was dominated by the Democratic Party presidential level until 1964. Starting with the 2000s, the county has become consistently Republican at the presidential level, though by smaller margins than many rural counties in Georgia.

For elections to the United States House of Representatives, Marion County is part of Georgia's 2nd congressional district, currently represented by Sanford Bishop. For elections to the Georgia State Senate, Marion County is part of District 15. For elections to the Georgia House of Representatives, Marion County is part of District 151.

United States presidential election results for Marion County, Georgia
Year	Republican		Democratic		Third party(ies)	
Year	No.	%	No.	%	No.	%
1912	41	13.85%	240	81.08%	15	5.07%
1916	96	20.51%	330	70.51%	42	8.97%
1920	180	43.27%	236	56.73%	0	0.00%
1924	31	9.66%	272	84.74%	18	5.61%
1928	114	23.80%	365	76.20%	0	0.00%
1932	24	5.01%	455	94.99%	0	0.00%
1936	62	12.84%	420	86.96%	1	0.21%
1940	77	11.27%	605	88.58%	1	0.15%
1944	70	12.26%	501	87.74%	0	0.00%
1948	45	8.32%	283	52.31%	213	39.37%
1952	182	21.85%	651	78.15%	0	0.00%
1956	158	20.36%	618	79.64%	0	0.00%
1960	154	19.27%	645	80.73%	0	0.00%
1964	719	66.27%	365	33.64%	1	0.09%
1968	186	14.51%	247	19.27%	849	66.22%
1972	850	83.83%	164	16.17%	0	0.00%
1976	291	18.13%	1,314	81.87%	0	0.00%
1980	567	31.98%	1,174	66.22%	32	1.80%
1984	846	47.08%	951	52.92%	0	0.00%
1988	804	48.67%	844	51.09%	4	0.24%
1992	711	34.58%	1,145	55.69%	200	9.73%
1996	678	37.23%	977	53.65%	166	9.12%
2000	1,187	54.35%	982	44.96%	15	0.69%
2004	1,670	56.48%	1,275	43.12%	12	0.41%
2008	1,772	55.58%	1,381	43.32%	35	1.10%
2012	1,733	54.51%	1,412	44.42%	34	1.07%
2016	1,921	60.22%	1,213	38.03%	56	1.76%
2020	2,275	62.74%	1,312	36.18%	39	1.08%
2024	2,348	64.84%	1,253	34.60%	20	0.55%

United States Senate election results for Marion County, Georgia2
Year	Republican		Democratic		Third party(ies)	
Year	No.	%	No.	%	No.	%
2020	2,248	62.46%	1,267	35.20%	84	2.33%
2020	1,998	62.15%	1,217	37.85%	0	0.00%

United States Senate election results for Marion County, Georgia3
Year	Republican		Democratic		Third party(ies)	
Year	No.	%	No.	%	No.	%
2020	1,078	30.40%	849	23.94%	1,619	45.66%
2020	1,994	62.10%	1,217	37.90%	0	0.00%
2022	1,750	61.75%	1,018	35.92%	66	2.33%
2022	1,655	61.66%	1,029	38.34%	0	0.00%

Georgia Gubernatorial election results for Marion County
Year	Republican		Democratic		Third party(ies)	
Year	No.	%	No.	%	No.	%
2022	1,868	65.64%	954	33.52%	24	0.84%

== See also ==
- National Register of Historic Places listings in Marion County, Georgia
- List of counties in Georgia
