= Geneva, Georgia =

- Town
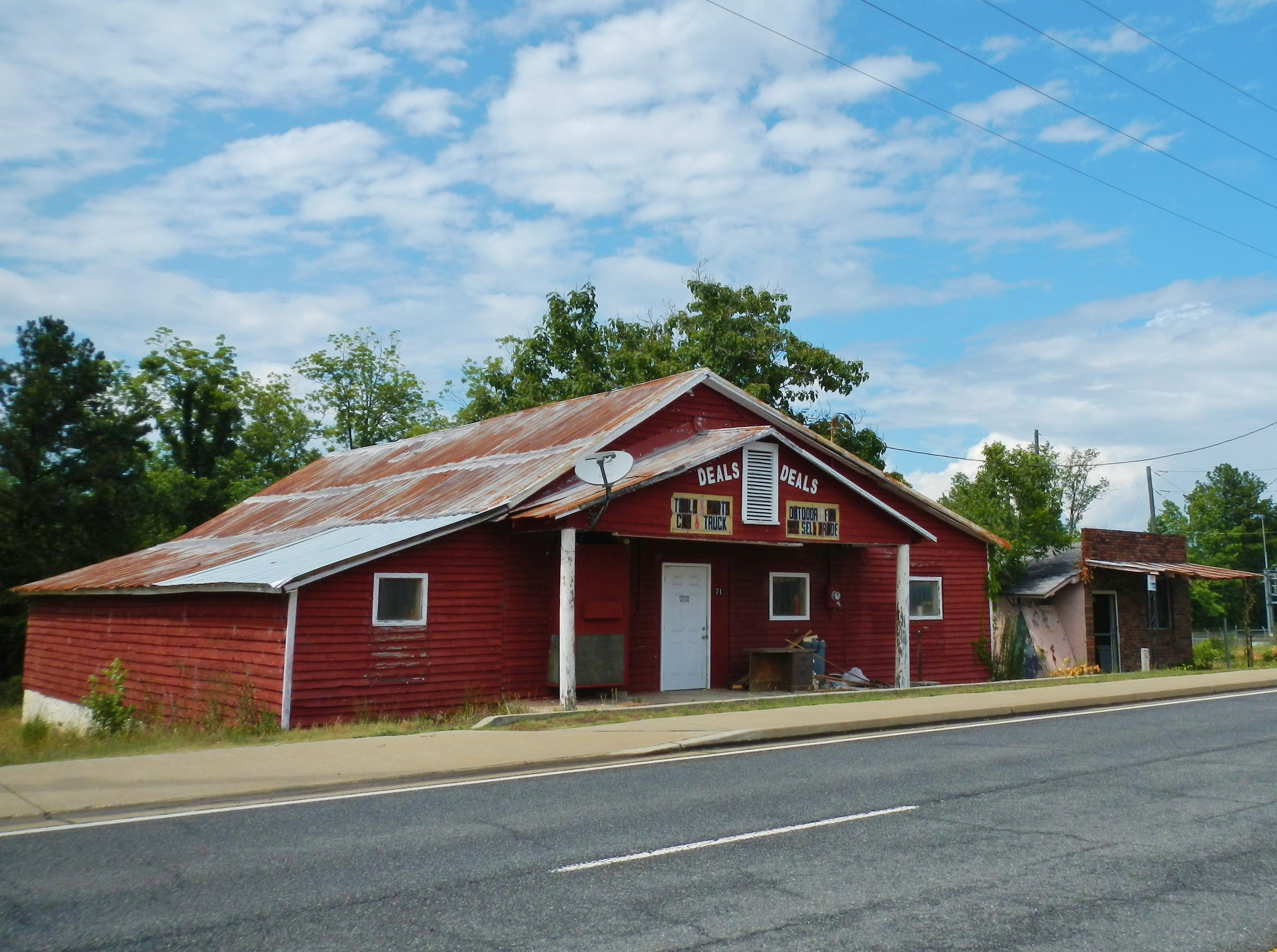
- Geneva, Georgia (2012)

- Location in Talbot County and the state of Georgia
- Coordinates: 32°34′46″N 84°33′2″W
- Country: United States
- State: Georgia
- County: Talbot

Government
  - Type: Mayor-council government
  - Mayor: Nigelco Marshall
  - Geneva City Council Members: Members: Wanda Callier; Danny Lockhart; Susan Lockhart; Evelyn Walker

Area
  - Total: 0.79 sq mi (2.04 km^{2})
  - Land: 0.79 sq mi (2.04 km^{2})
  - Water: 0 sq mi (0.00 km^{2})
- Elevation: 584 ft (178 m)

Population (2020)
  - Total: 75
  - Density: 95/sq mi (36.8/km^{2})
- Time zone: UTC-5 (Eastern (EST))
  - Summer (DST): UTC-4 (EDT)
- ZIP code: 31810
- Area code: 706
- FIPS code: 13-32412
- GNIS feature ID: 0355991

Geneva is a town in Talbot County, Georgia, United States. The population was 75 at the 2020 census.

== History ==
The Georgia General Assembly incorporated the Town of Geneva in 1870. The community's name is a transfer from Geneva, in Switzerland.

== Geography ==
Geneva is located at 32°34′46″N 84°33′2″W (32.579438, -84.550485).

The town is located in the southern portion of the county at a junction of the Fall Line Freeway and U.S. Route 80. U.S. Route 80 leads north 8 mi (13 km) to Talbotton, the county seat, and joins the Fall Line Freeway to head west 33 mi (53 km) to Columbus. The Fall Line Freeway travels east 6 mi (10 km) to Junction City, concurrent with Georgia State Route 96, which begins at the end of U.S. Route 80's concurrency with the Fall Line Freeway. Georgia State Route 41 also runs through the town, following U.S. Route 80 to Talbotton and leading south 20 mi (32 km) to Buena Vista.

According to the United States Census Bureau, the town has a total area of 0.8 square miles (2.1 km^{2}), all land.

== Demographics ==
Historical population
Census	Pop.	Note	%±
1880	254		—
1900	264		—
1910	210		−20.5%
1920	210		0.0%
1930	179		−14.8%
1940	203		13.4%
1950	209		3.0%
1960	262		25.4%
1970	250		−4.6%
1980	232		−7.2%
1990	182		−21.6%
2000	114		−37.4%
2010	105		−7.9%
2020	75		−28.6%
U.S. Decennial Census; 1850-1870 1870-1880; 1890-1910 1920-1930; 1940 1950 1960; 1970 1980 1990; 2000 2010 2020

Geneva town, Georgia – Racial and ethnic composition Note: the US Census treats Hispanic/Latino as an ethnic category. This table excludes Latinos from the racial categories and assigns them to a separate category. Hispanics/Latinos may be of any race.
Race / Ethnicity (NH = Non-Hispanic)	Pop 2000	Pop 2010	Pop 2020	% 2000	% 2010	% 2020
White alone (NH)	52	32	28	45.61%	30.48%	37.33%
Black or African American alone (NH)	60	72	39	52.63%	68.57%	52.00%
Native American or Alaska Native alone (NH)	0	1	0	0.00%	0.85%	0.00%
Asian alone (NH)	0	0	0	0.00%	0.00%	0.00%
Pacific Islander alone (NH)	0	0	0	0.00%	0.00%	0.00%
Other race alone (NH)	0	0	0	0.00%	0.00%	0.00%
Mixed race or Multiracial (NH)	2	0	2	1.75%	0.00%	2.67%
Hispanic or Latino (any race)	0	0	6	0.00%	0.00%	8.00%
Total	114	105	75	100.00%	100.00%	100.00%

As of the census of 2000, there were 114 people, 52 households, and 34 families residing in the town. In 2020, there were 75 people residing in the town.
