= Marion County Courthouse (Georgia) =

- U.S. National Register of Historic Places
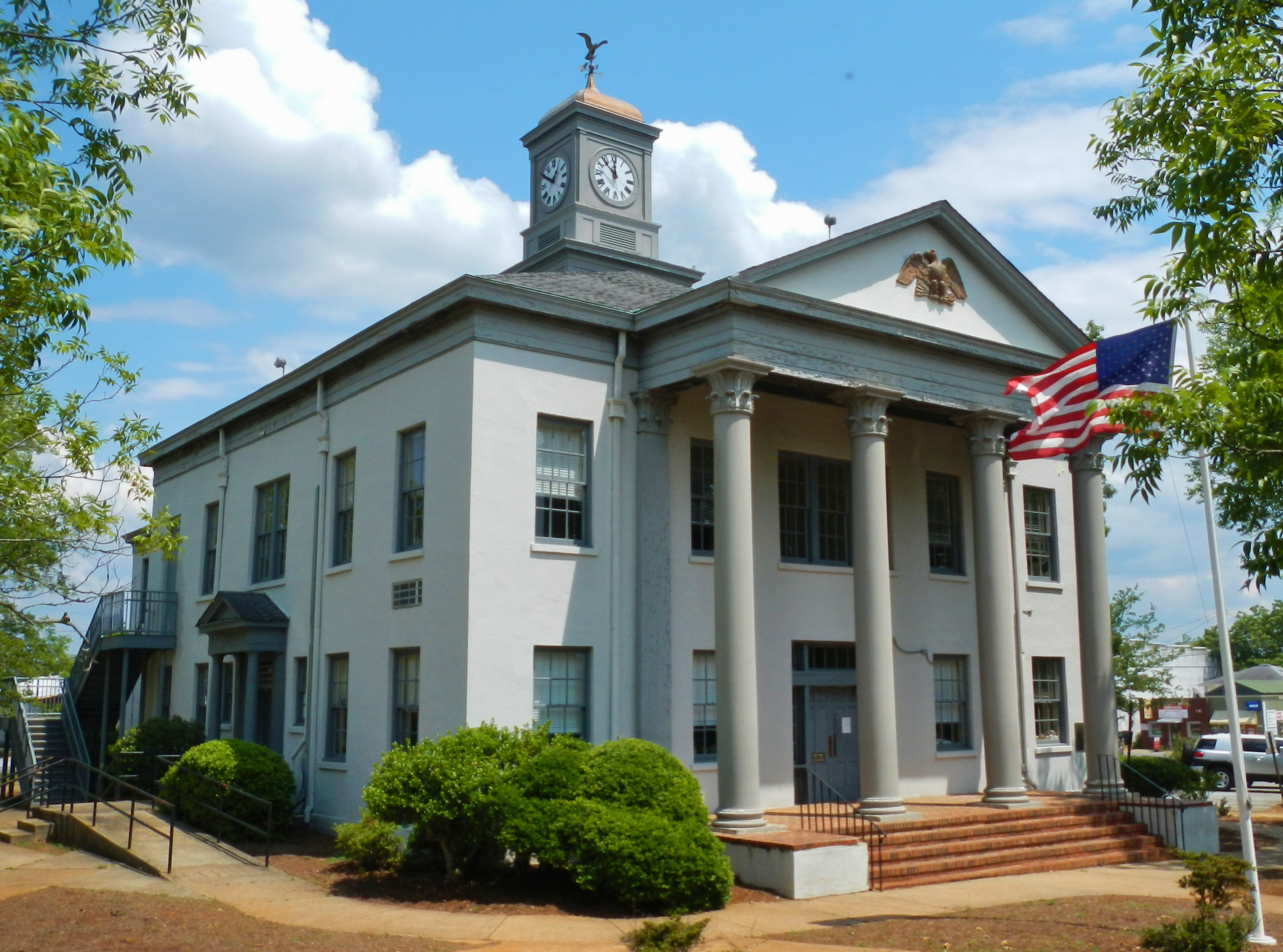

- Location within Georgia Location within the United States
- Location: Courthouse Sq., Buena Vista, Georgia
- Coordinates: 32°19′6″N 84°31′3″W
- Area: 4 acres (1.6 ha)
- Built: 1928
- Built by: W. C. Fulford
- Architect: T.W. Smith, E.A. Smith
- Architectural style: Vernacular, Neoclassical
- MPS: Georgia County Courthouses TR
- NRHP reference No.: 80001115
- Added to NRHP: September 18, 1980

The Marion County Courthouse is a historic county courthouse in Buena Vista, Georgia, county seat of Marion County, Georgia. It was built in 1850 of local brick. A historical marker commemorates the courthouse and its construction. A columned entrance was added in 1928. The courthouse's architecture is described as Vernacular architecture with Neoclassical Revival architecture alterations. It was added to the National Register of Historic Places on September 18, 1980. It is located in Courthouse Square.

The Old Marion County Courthouse in Tazewell, Georgia is also listed on the National Register.

== See also ==
- National Register of Historic Places listings in Marion County, Georgia
