= Marion County Courthouse =

Marion County Courthouse or Old Marion County Courthouse may refer to:

- Marion County Courthouse (Arkansas), Yellville, Arkansas
- Marion County Courthouse (Georgia), Buena Vista, Georgia
- Old Marion County Courthouse (Georgia), Tazewell, Georgia
- Marion County Courthouse (Illinois), Salem, Illinois
- Marion County Courthouse (Iowa), Knoxville, Iowa
- Marion County Courthouse (Indiana), Marion County, Indiana, the tallest building in Indianapolis until 1962
- Marion County Courthouse (Kansas), Marion, Kansas
- Marion County Courthouse, located in the Lebanon Historic Commercial District, Lebanon, Kentucky
- Marion County Courthouse and Jail, Columbia, Mississippi, listed on the National Register of Historic Places
- Marion County Courthouse (Missouri), Hannibal, Missouri
- Marion County Courthouse (Ohio), Marion, Ohio
- Marion County Courthouse (Oregon), Salem, Oregon
- Marion County Courthouse (Texas), Jefferson, Texas, a Recorded Texas Historic Landmark
- Marion County Courthouse (West Virginia), Fairmount, West Virginia
