= Marion County School District =

Marion County School District may refer to:

- Marion County Schools (Alabama)
- Marion County Public Schools, Florida
- Marion County School District (Georgia)
- Marion–Florence USD 408, Kansas
- Marion County School District (Mississippi)
- Marion County R-II School District (Missouri)
- Marion City School District (Ohio)
- Marion County Schools (Tennessee)
- Marion County Schools (West Virginia)
