= Fort Perry =

- U.S. National Register of Historic Places
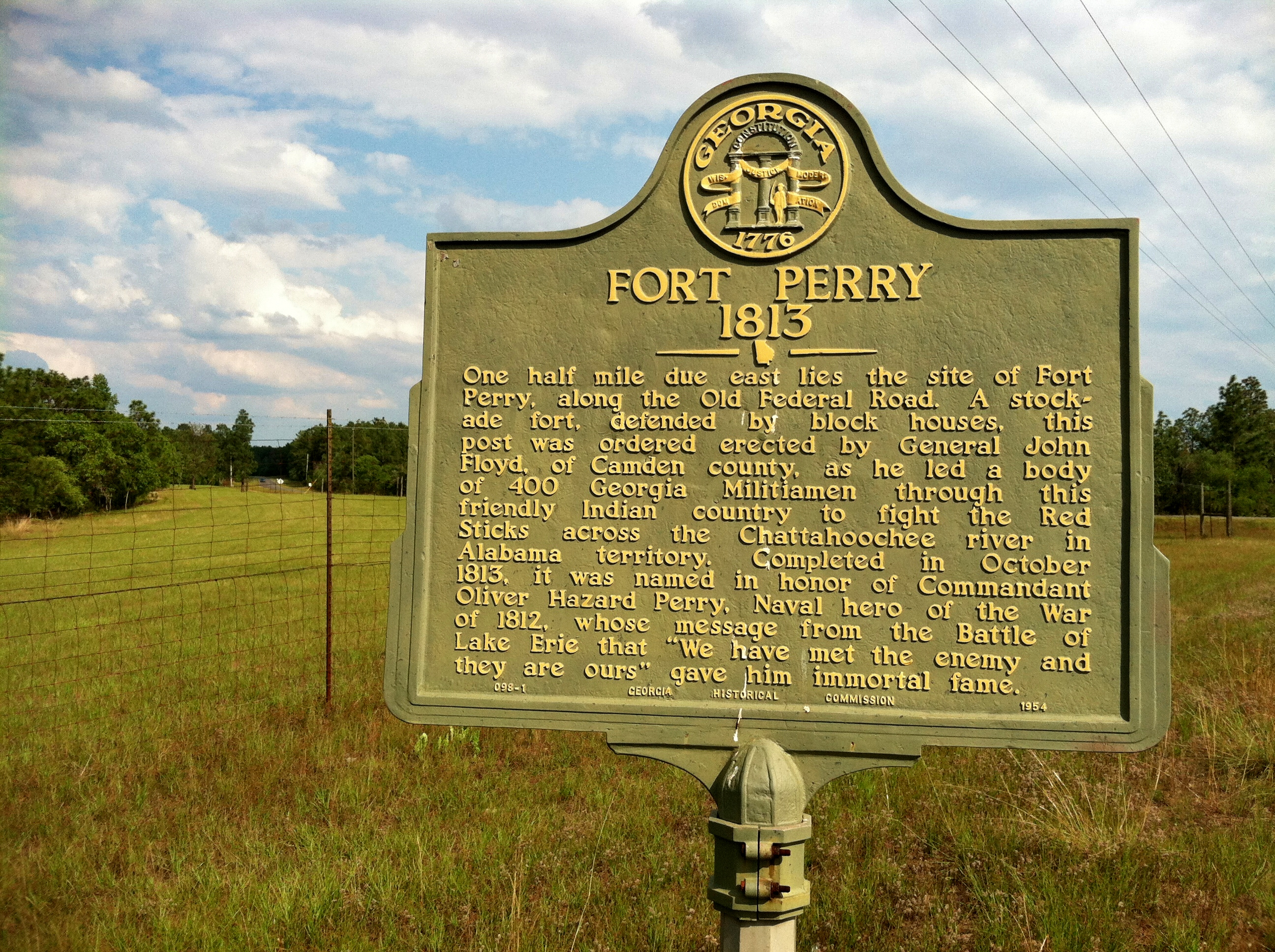
- Fort Perry historical marker

- Location within Georgia
- Nearest city: Buena Vista, Georgia
- Coordinates: 32°28′41″N 84°32′39″W
- Area: 30 acres (12 ha)
- Built: 1813
- Built by: Floyd, Gen. John
- NRHP reference No.: 75000601
- Added to NRHP: July 30, 1975

Fort Perry is the site of a historic stockade fort defended by block houses in the area of Box Springs, Georgia. It was built in 1813 along the Old Federal Road. The site is commemorated by a historical marker located nearby on Fort Perry Road. It was constructed under General John Floyd and was used as a base of attack on the Sticks tribe (Red Sticks on the other side of the Chattahoochee River in Alabama territory). The fort was named for Oliver Hazard Perry. Fort Perry was added to the National Register of Historic Places on July 30, 1975.

== See also ==
- National Register of Historic Places listings in Marion County, Georgia
