= National Register of Historic Places listings in Marion County, Georgia =

This is a list of properties and districts in Marion County, Georgia that are listed on the National Register of Historic Places (NRHP).

This National Park Service list is complete through NPS recent listings posted March 21, 2025.

== Current listings ==
	Name on the Register	Image	Date listed	Location	City or town	Description
1	Alfred and Jane Ables House	Alfred and Jane Ables House	August 9, 2002 (#02000841)	230 E. Fifth Ave. 32°19′06″N 84°30′41″W	Buena Vista	
2	Champion-McGarrah Plantation	Champion-McGarrah Plantation	June 28, 1984 (#84001156)	Off GA 30; 32°09′45″N 84°27′12″W	Friendship	
3	Drane-Stevens House	Drane-Stevens House	July 28, 1999 (#99000899)	108 Church St. (between Fourth and Fifth Ave.); 32°19′07″N 84°30′54″W	Buena Vista	
4	Fort Perry	Fort Perry	July 30, 1975 (#75000601)	Fort Perry Road; 32°28′41″N 84°32′39″W	Box Springs	
5	Marion County Courthouse	Marion County Courthouse	September 18, 1980 (#80001115)	Courthouse Sq. 32°19′06″N 84°31′03″W	Buena Vista	
6	Old Marion County Courthouse	Old Marion County Courthouse	September 18, 1980 (#80001116)	GA 137; 32°22′50″N 84°26′27″W	Tazewell	One of three antebellum courthouses still existing in Georgia.
7	Pasaquan	Pasaquan	August 27, 2008 (#08000833)	Eddie Martin Rd. 32°20′46″N 84°34′53″W	Buena Vista	
8	Shiloh-Marion Baptist Church and Cemetery	Shiloh-Marion Baptist Church and Cemetery	May 17, 1984 (#84001159)	6697 GA 41; 32°09′36″N 84°32′36″W	Buena Vista	
