= Luther H. Story =

United States Army Medal of Honor recipient

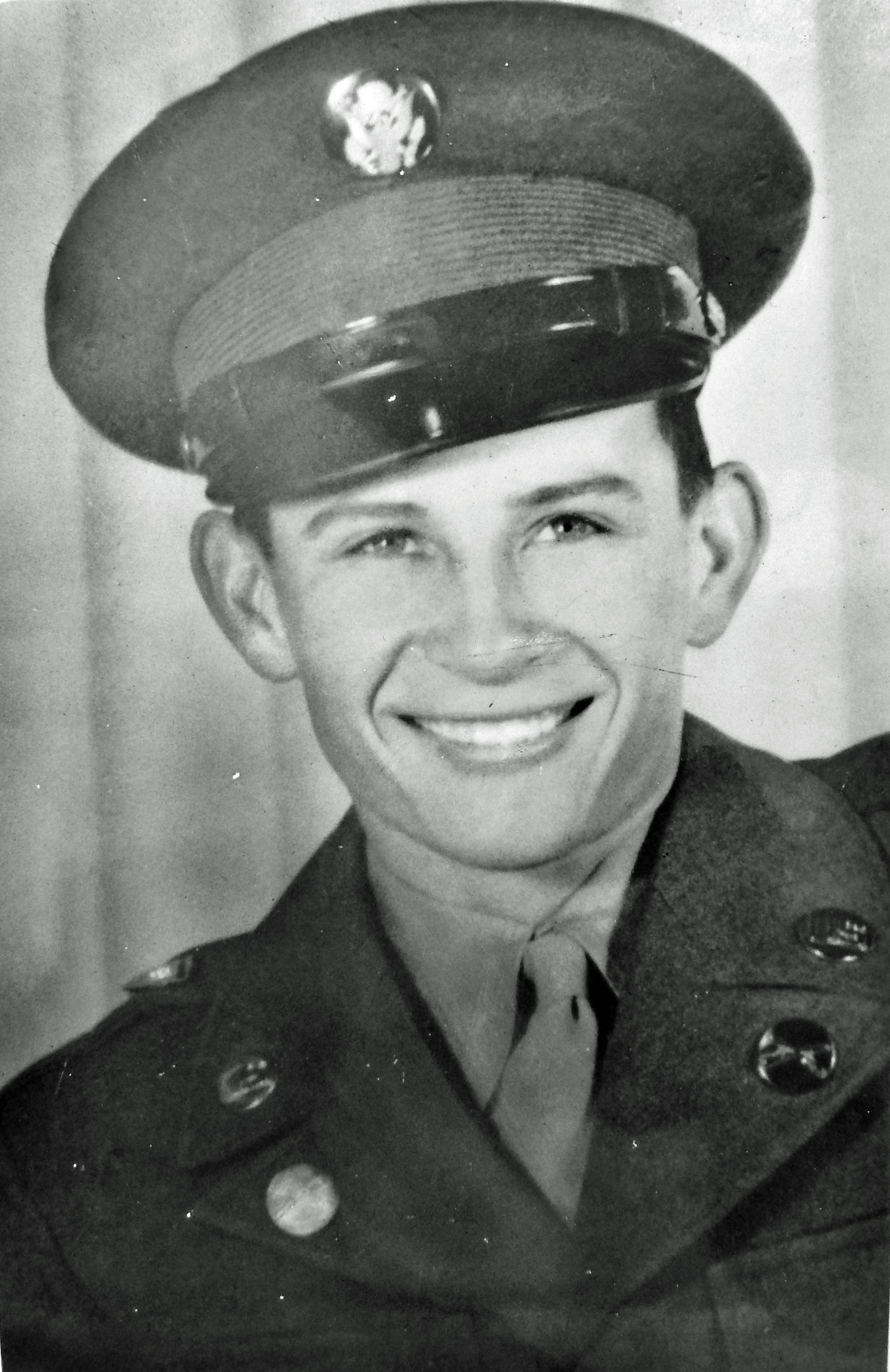
- Luther Story
- Born: July 20, 1932; Buena Vista, Georgia, US
- Died: September 1, 1950 (aged 18) near Agok, Korea
- Burial place: Andersonville National Cemetery
- Military career
- Allegiance: United States of America
- Branch: United States Army
- Service years: 1948–1950
- Rank: Corporal (posthumous)
- Units: Company A, 9th Infantry Regiment, 2nd Infantry Division
- Conflicts: Korean War †
- Awards: Medal of Honor; Purple Heart

Luther H. Story (July 20, 1932 – September 1, 1950) was a soldier in the United States Army during the Korean War. He posthumously received the Medal of Honor for his actions on September 1, 1950, during the Battle of Yongsan.

== Early life ==
He was born in Buena Vista, Georgia, in 1932 into a family of sharecroppers and grew up in Sumter County. According to his niece, Judy Wade, his family worked in Plains on land owned by James Earl Carter Sr., the father of 39th president Jimmy Carter. The family moved to Americus, Georgia. Luther attended high school there, but left in his sophomore year and enlisted in the Army in 1948. His mother gave the Army a fake birthdate—July 20, 1931—as he was only 16.

== Korean War ==
In summer 1950, he and the 2nd Infantry Division were sent to Korea. On September 1 of that year, he was killed in action near the village of Agok on the Naktong River in the Battle of Yongsan, part of the Battle of Pusan Perimeter.

=== Medal of Honor citation ===
Rank and organization Private First Class, U.S. Army, Company A, 9th Infantry Regiment, 2nd Infantry Division Place and date: Near Agok, Korea, September 1, 1950

Entered service at: Georgia. Born: July 20, 1931, Buena Vista, Georgia

G.O. No.: 70, August 2, 1951

Citation:

Pfc. Story, distinguished himself by conspicuous gallantry and intrepidity above and beyond the call of duty in action. A savage daylight attack by elements of 3 enemy divisions penetrated the thinly held lines of the 9th Infantry. Company A beat off several banzai attacks but was bypassed and in danger of being cut off and surrounded. Pfc. Story, a weapons squad leader, was heavily engaged in stopping the early attacks and had just moved his squad to a position overlooking the Naktong River when he observed a large group of the enemy crossing the river to attack Company A. Seizing a machine gun from his wounded gunner he placed deadly fire on the hostile column killing or wounding an estimated 100 enemy soldiers. Facing certain encirclement the company commander ordered a withdrawal. During the move Pfc. Story noticed the approach of an enemy truck loaded with troops and towing an ammunition trailer. Alerting his comrades to take cover he fearlessly stood in the middle of the road, throwing grenades into the truck. Out of grenades he crawled to his squad, gathered up additional grenades and again attacked the vehicle. During the withdrawal the company was attacked by such superior numbers that it was forced to deploy in a rice field. Pfc. Story was wounded in this action, but, disregarding his wounds, rallied the men about him and repelled the attack. Realizing that his wounds would hamper his comrades he refused to retire to the next position but remained to cover the company's withdrawal. When last seen he was firing every weapon available and fighting off another hostile assault. Private Story's extraordinary heroism, aggressive leadership, and supreme devotion to duty reflect the highest credit upon himself and were in keeping with the esteemed traditions of the military service.

== Other Honors ==
For his actions, he was posthumously awarded the Medal of Honor, which was presented to his father at the Pentagon by General of the Army Omar Bradley on June 21, 1951. His medal is on display at the National Infantry Museum in Columbus, Georgia.

Private First Class Story was posthumously promoted to corporal.

The Luther Story Bridge over the Flint River in his native state of Georgia is named in his honor.

== Identification and burial ==
In 1953, remains and prisoners of war were exchanged in Operation Glory, the remains being buried in the National Memorial Cemetery of the Pacific in Honolulu. In June 2021, some of the remains were disinterred and examined by the Defense POW/MIA Accounting Agency to try to identify the dead. On April 26, 2023, it was announced that the remains of Luther H. Story had been identified. He was reinterred at Andersonville National Cemetery on Memorial Day 2023.

== See also ==
- List of Medal of Honor recipients
- List of Korean War Medal of Honor recipients
