= Shiloh-Marion Baptist Church and Cemetery =

Historic site in Marion County, Georgia, US

- U.S. National Register of Historic Places
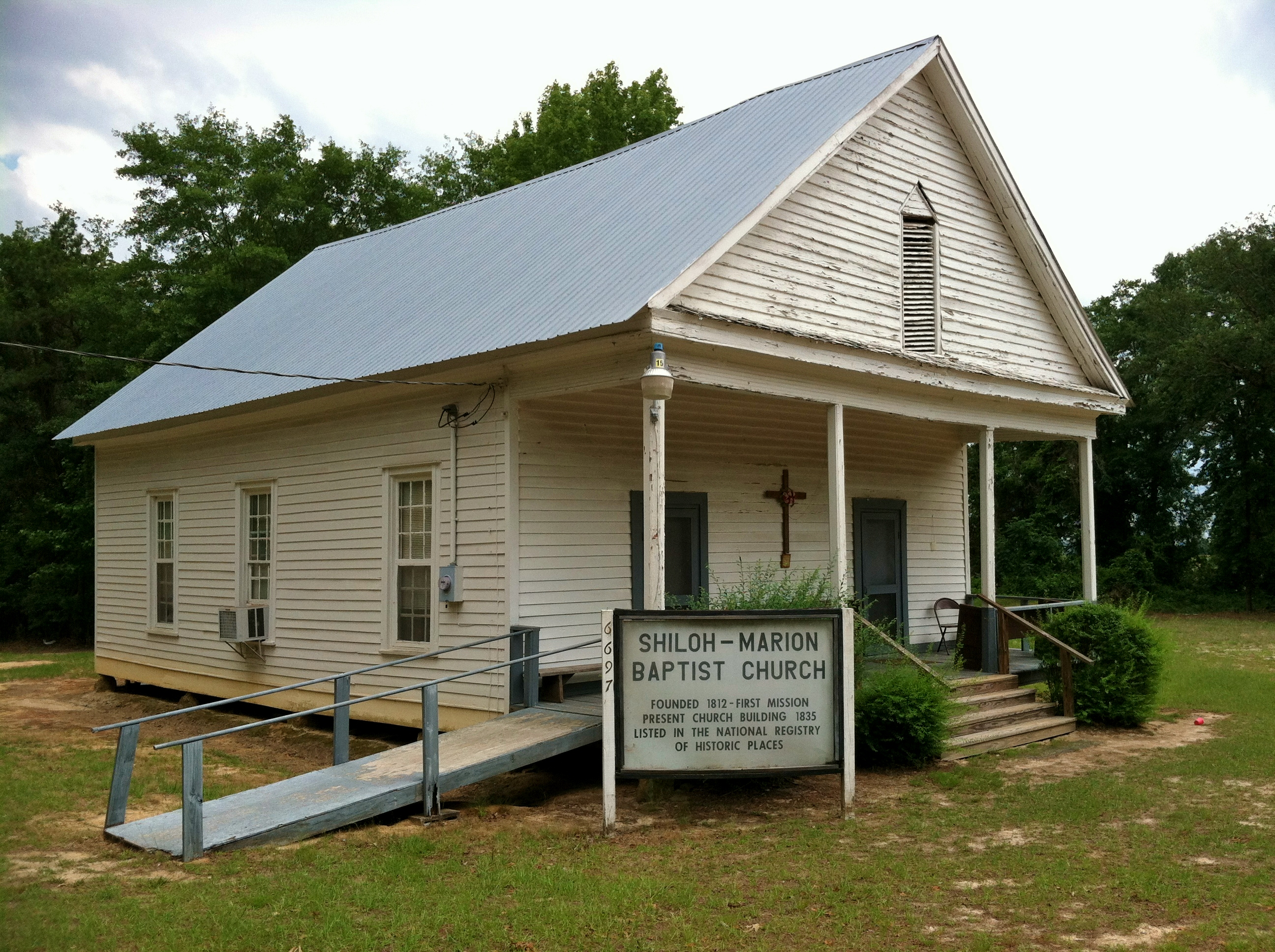
- Shiloh-Marion Baptist Church in 2012.

- Location within Georgia Location within the United States
- Nearest city: Buena Vista, Georgia
- Coordinates: 32°9′36″N 84°32′36″W
- Area: 10 acres (4.0 ha)
- Built: 1835; 191 years ago
- Architectural style: Greek Revival
- NRHP reference No.: 84001159
- Added to NRHP: May 17, 1984

Shiloh-Marion Baptist Church and Cemetery is a historic place in Buena Vista, Georgia.

The Greek Revival style church building was constructed in 1835 and added to the National Register of Historic Places in 1984.

It is a one-story one-room wood-frame building with a gable roof, on stone piers. It is covered with weatherboard siding and has no exterior ornamentation.

One reason the church was deemed significant is that it represents the former community of Church Hill. It is the only surviving structure of the community, which once had five churches plus an academy. It had a phone line in 1885 and it had a post office until 1903. Its NRHP nomination notes an association to the Christian Union faith:

In religious history, the church is important for representing the intensity of churches that once existed here, including the important Christian Union faith, which was founded by the Reverend George Lynch Smith. It had all of its few churches in this area. It is important that in the deep, tradition-rooted antebellum South, a minister could gather a flock, albeit small, around the tenets of a new faith, an offshoot of the Church of Christ movement. Although it lasted only a few decades, it is important in Georgia's religious heritage, and this is the only vestige of the community in which it was located. Traditional accounts are that many meetings were held in other church structures, for the Christian Union faith did not always have its own churches. Thus, some of their meetings had to be held in other churches, such as this one.
