= Marion County School District (Georgia) =

School district in Georgia (U.S. state)

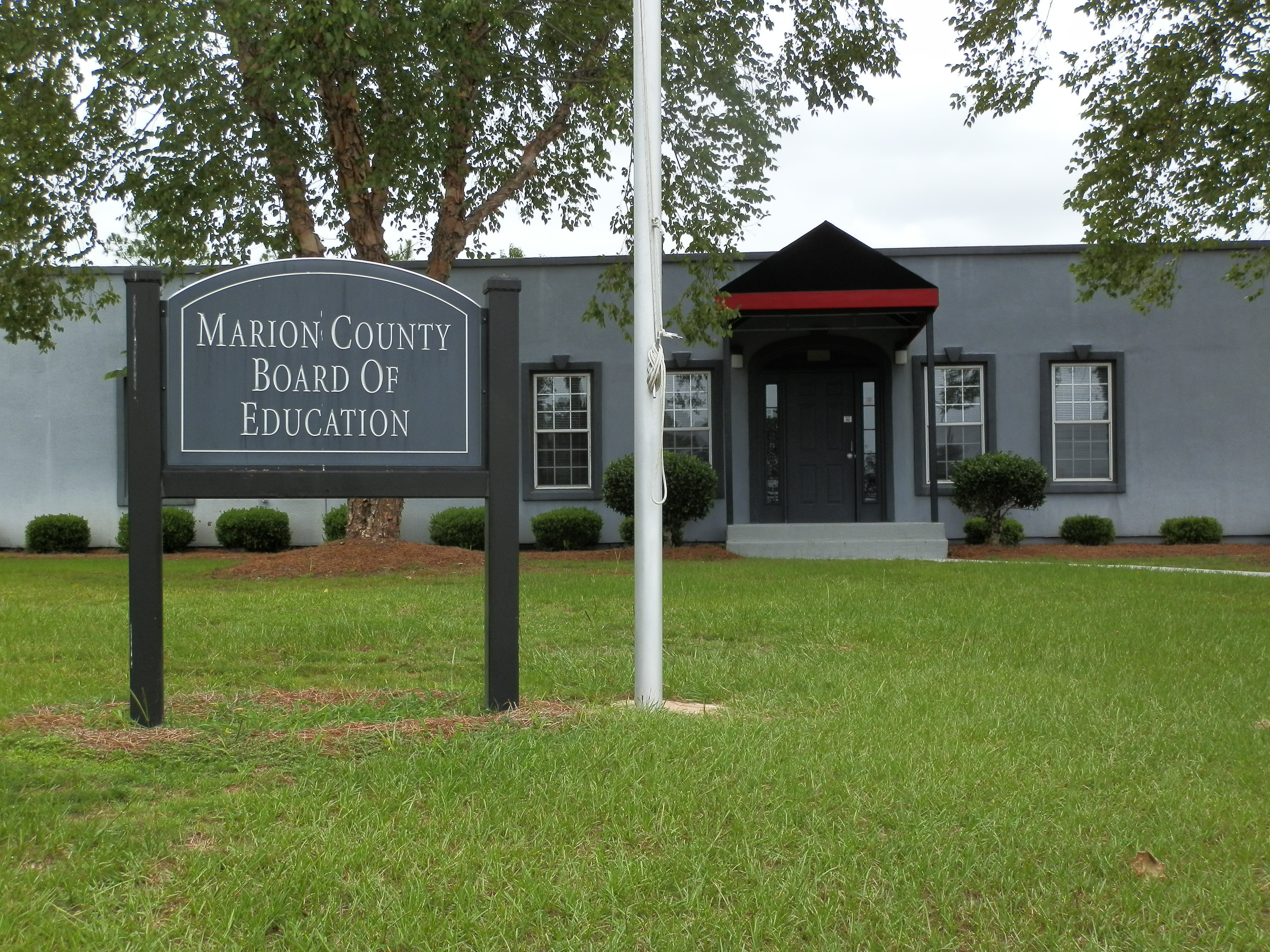
- Marion County, Georgia, Board of Education Office

Address
- 1697 Pineville Road Buena Vista, Georgia, 31803; United States
- Coordinates: 32.306059°N 84.52269°W

District information
- Grades: Pre-school - 12
- Superintendent: Glenn Tidwell
- Accreditation(s): Southern Association of Colleges and Schools; Georgia Accrediting Commission

Students and staff
- Enrollment: 1,686
- Faculty: 108

Other information
- Website: www.marion.k12.ga.us

The Marion County School District is a public school district in Marion County, Georgia, United States, based in Buena Vista.

The only school district in the county, it serves the communities of Buena Vista, Juniper, Mauk, Tazewell, and Oakland.

== Schools ==
The Marion County School District has one elementary school and one middle/high school. Both schools are in unincorporated areas.

Schools:

- L. K. Moss Primary School
- Marion County High School
