= Pasaquan =

- U.S. National Register of Historic Places
- U.S. Historic district
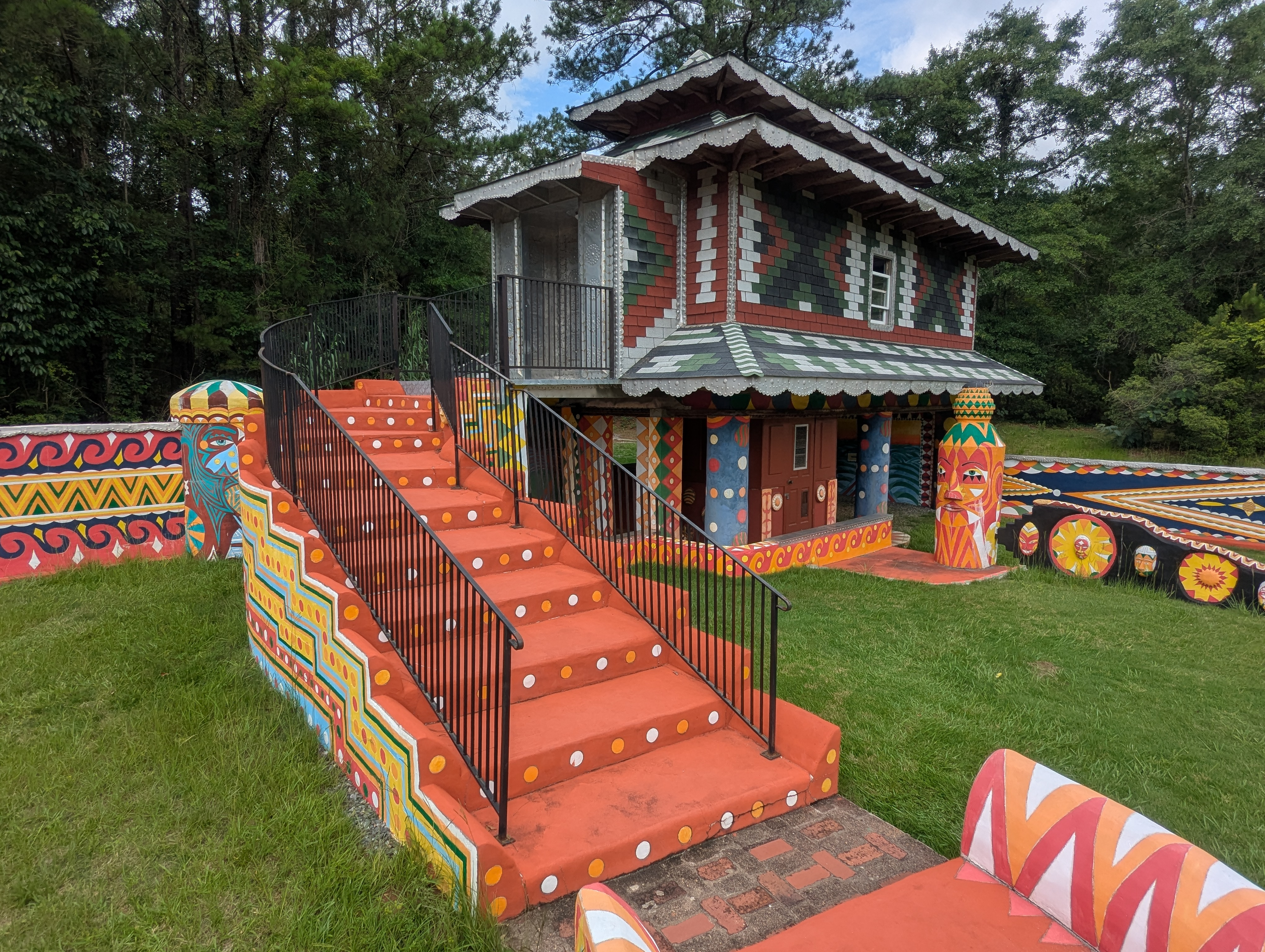
- Pasaquan in 2026, after its restoration

- Location within Georgia Location within the United States
- Nearest city: Buena Vista, Georgia
- Coordinates: 32.34635°N 84.58150°W
- Built: 1957
- Architect: Martin, Eddie Owens; et al.
- Website: pasaquan.columbusstate.edu
- NRHP reference No.: 08000833
- Added to NRHP: August 27, 2008

Pasaquan is a 7-acre (28,000 m^{2}) compound near Buena Vista, Georgia. It was created by an eccentric folk artist named Eddie Owens Martin (1908–1986), who called himself St. EOM. An internationally renowned art site, it consists of six major structures including a redesigned 1885 farmhouse, painted concrete sculptures, and 4 acres (16,000 m^{2}) of painted masonry concrete walls. In September 2008, Pasaquan was accepted for listing in the National Register of Historic Places. Pasaquan was restored by the Kohler Foundation and Columbus State University between 2014 and 2016.

== Eddie Owens Martin ==
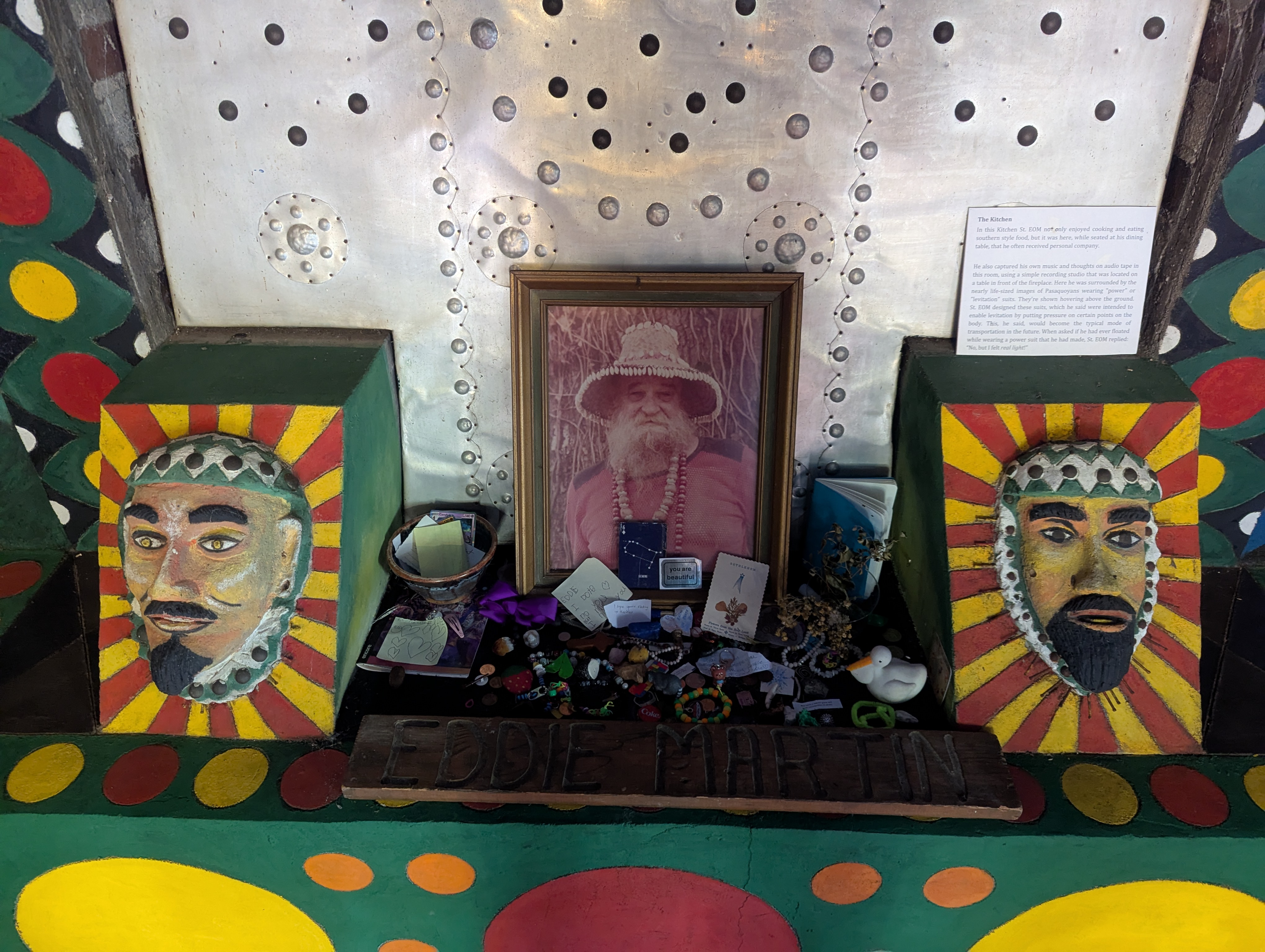
Memorial to Martin at Pasaquan

Eddie Owens Martin was born on July 4, 1908, in the village of Glen Alta in Marion County, Georgia to a sharecropper family of nine. He suffered abuse from his father that caused him to leave home for New York City at 14 years old and become a sex worker. His early adult years of skirting the law led to a one-year prison term in 1942. He became a fortune teller after his release from Federal Narcotics Prison on March 17, 1943. He died by suicide on April 16, 1986.

== Origins ==
Martin was inspired by a spirit to create a religion called Pasaquoyanism. Its members are called Pasaquoyans. The spirit also named Martin "Saint EOM." Pasaquoyanism emphasizes connection to the natural world and the use of hair. "Pasaquan" is a name coined from Spanish and Chinese meaning roughly "the past coming together." He inherited the house and four acres of land from his mother after she died in 1950; Martin moved his fortune-telling business to the site in 1957 after a dispute with his brother Julius. He transformed the property over many years using proceeds earned from fortune telling.

== Construction ==
Martin collected local natural materials to construct his first wall and hired D. W. Milner to assist him. His original decorated fence decayed because it was made out of wood. Edwin Stephens provided Martin with technical construction skills and a romantic relationship. After 10 years of construction, Martin began painting his structures with images inspired by his own personal acquaintances.

== Ownership transition ==
The Marion County Historical Society assumed ownership of Pasaquan in 1986. A special committee was formed in order to facilitate care of the site and Martin's various other works. The committee later purged various materials in order to focus on the compound itself. The Pasaquan Preservation Society was born out of the committee and operated Pasaquan until 2014. The Pasaquan Preservation Society deeded Pasaquan to the Kohler Foundation in 2014 in order to finance its restoration. The Kohler Foundation transferred ownership of Pasaquan to Columbus State University after it reopened in 2016.

== Restoration ==
In 2004, the Pasaquan Preservation Society solicited the Kohler Foundation for help in maintaining Pasaquan. The project was accepted in 2014. The Kohler Foundation collaborated with Columbus State University to restore Pasaquan's art. After two years of work, the site was re-opened to the public on October 22, 2016.

== Publicity ==
President Jimmy Carter visited the site in the early 1980s. In 2015, the Pasaquan Preservation Society won the Governor's Award for the Arts and Humanities for its work on Pasaquan. In 2016, CNN recommended Pasaquan as a tourist destination. In 2019, Atlanta recommended Pasaquan as a folk art destination.

== In popular culture ==
In 2013, Jason McCoy visited Pasaquan for his show Jason McCoy Eats America.

In 2017, James Ogburn and Scott Wilkerson created an opera called Eddie’s Stone Song: Odyssey of the First Pasaquoyan that celebrated Martin's life.

In 2022, the Tedeschi Trucks Band released a track titled "Pasaquan", in homage of the site, on their album I Am the Moon.

== Pasaquan gallery ==
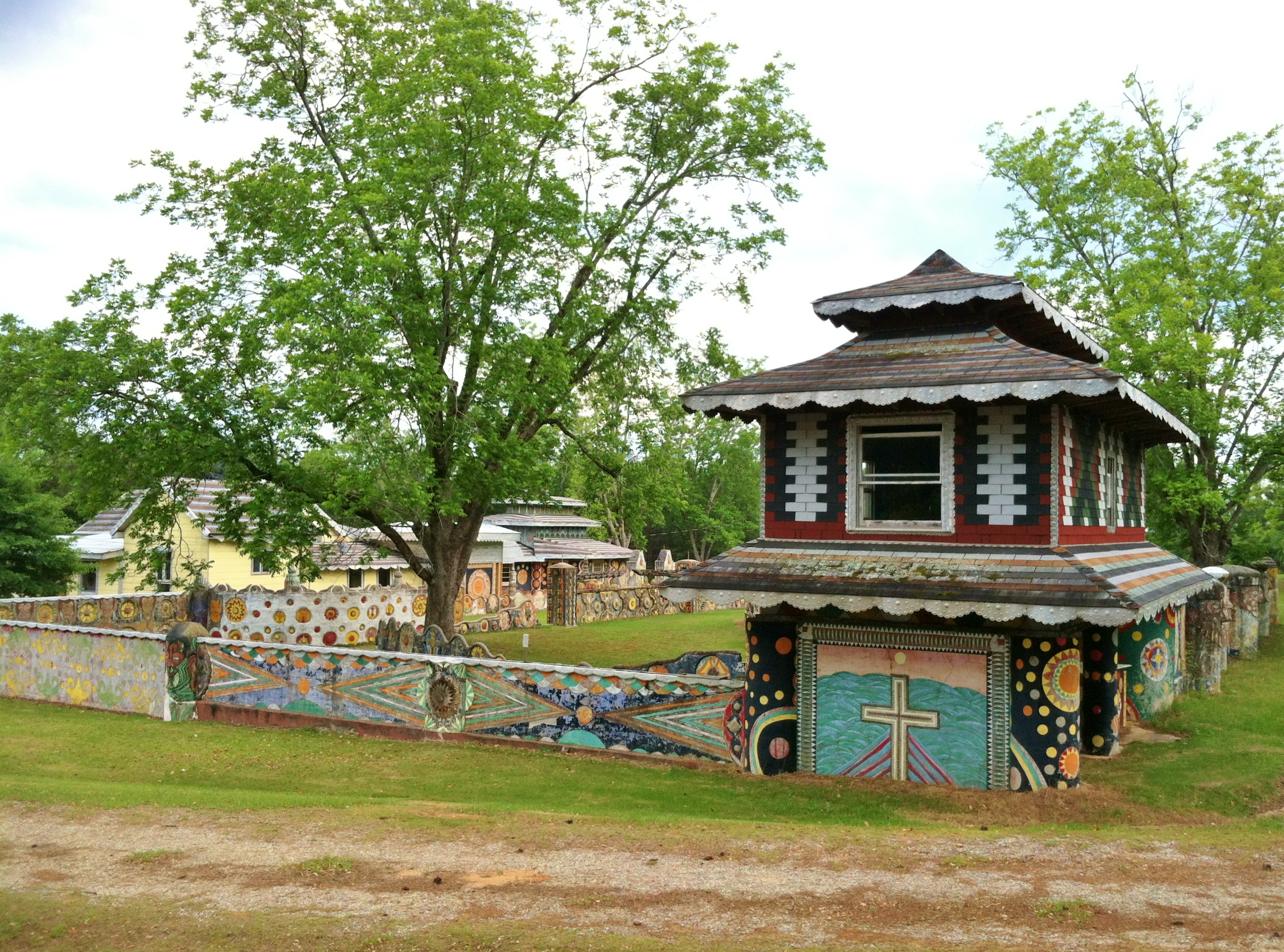
Pasaquan as seen from Eddie Martin Road in 2012.

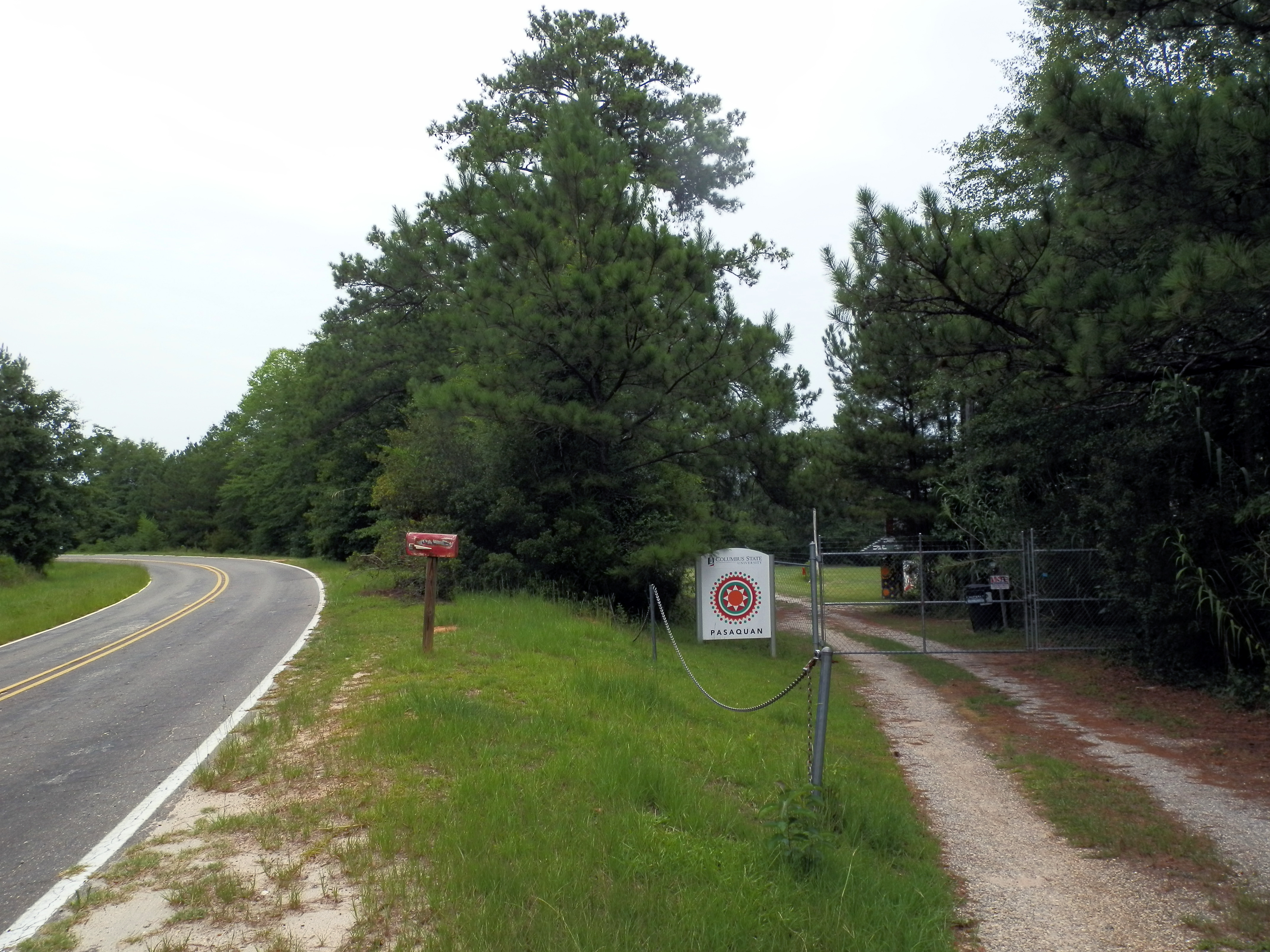
Entrance to Pasaquan

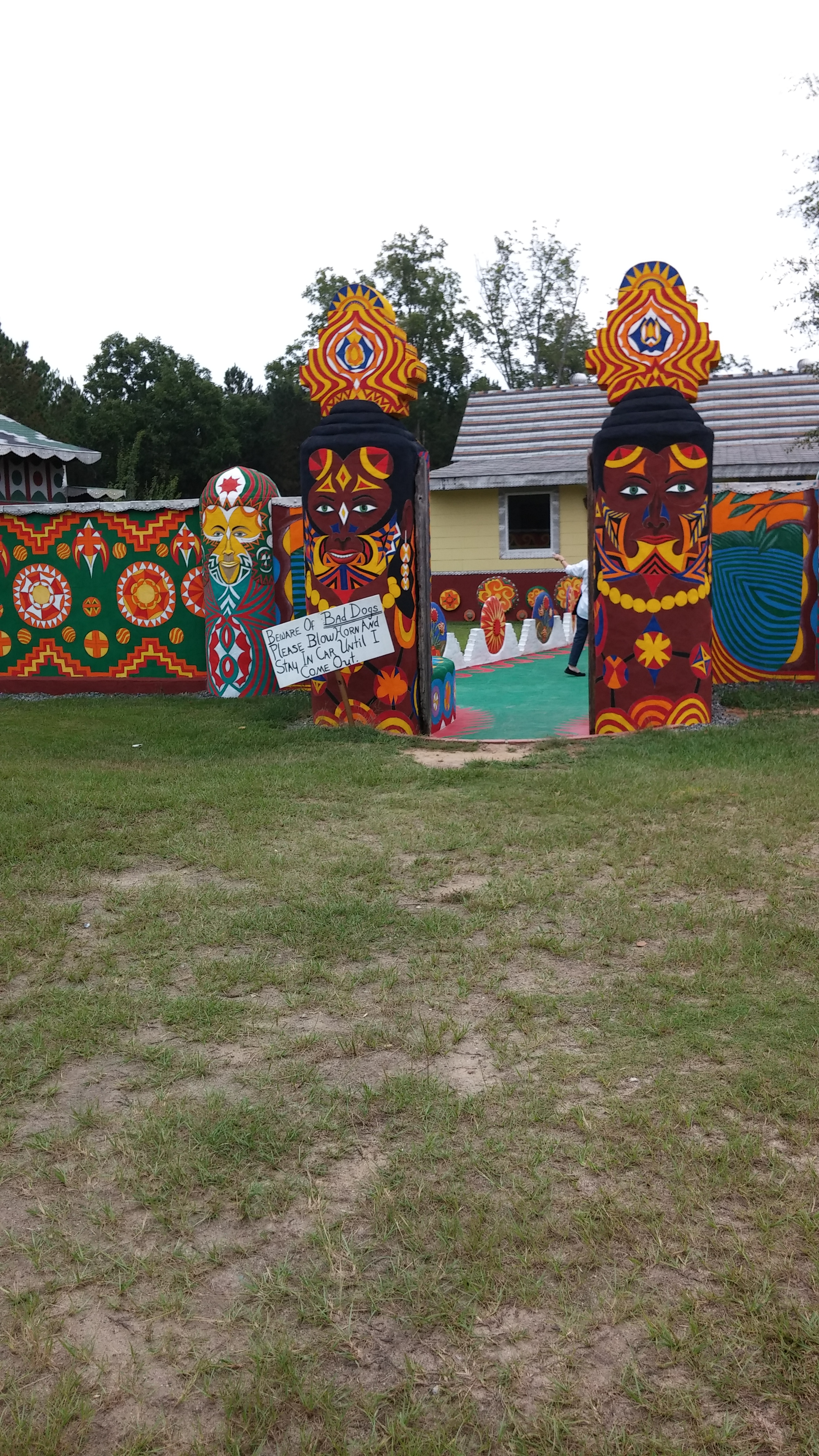
Pasaquan gate with recreation of Eddie Martin's Infamous Beware of Dog sign

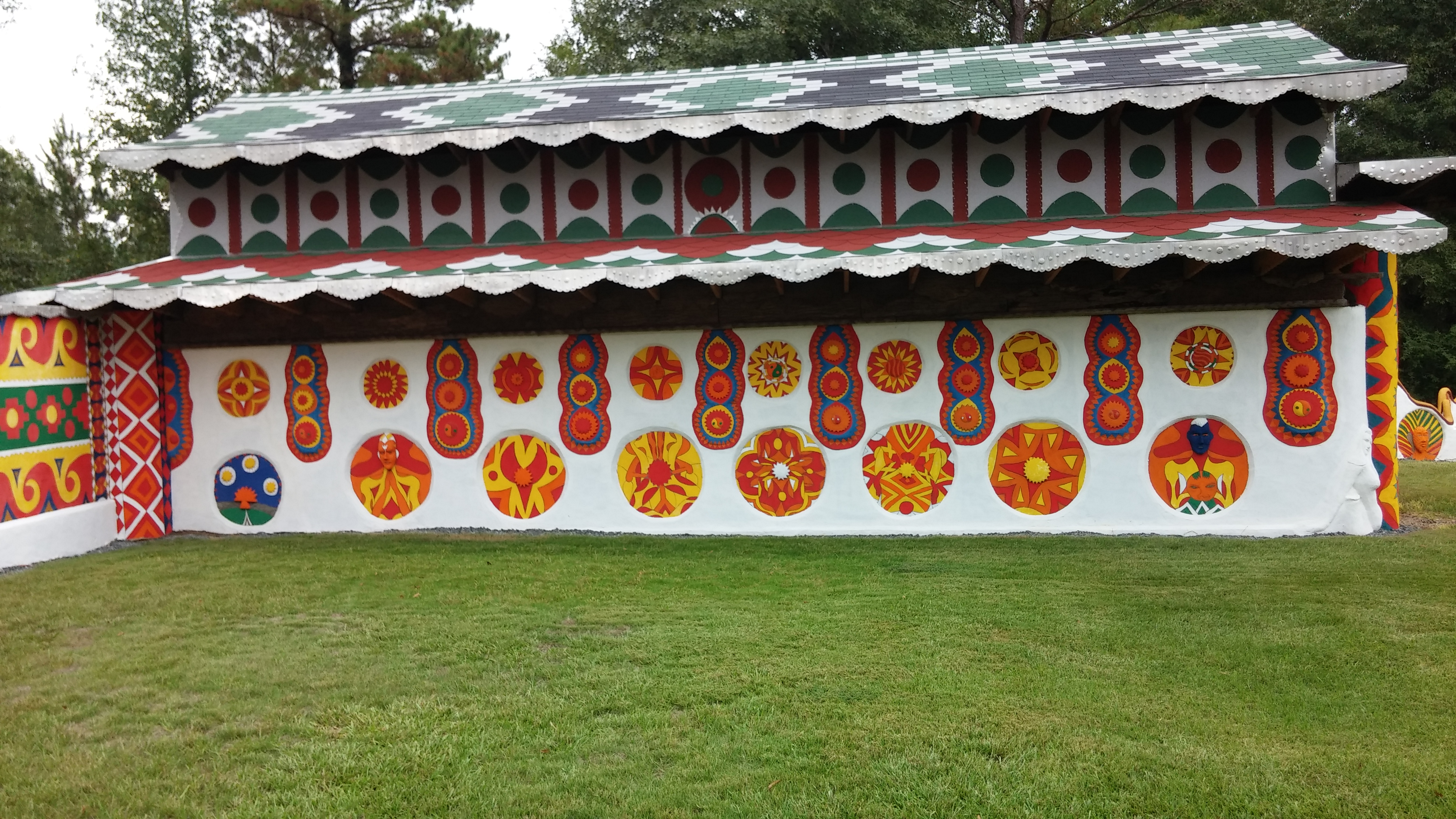
Pasaquan outside wall

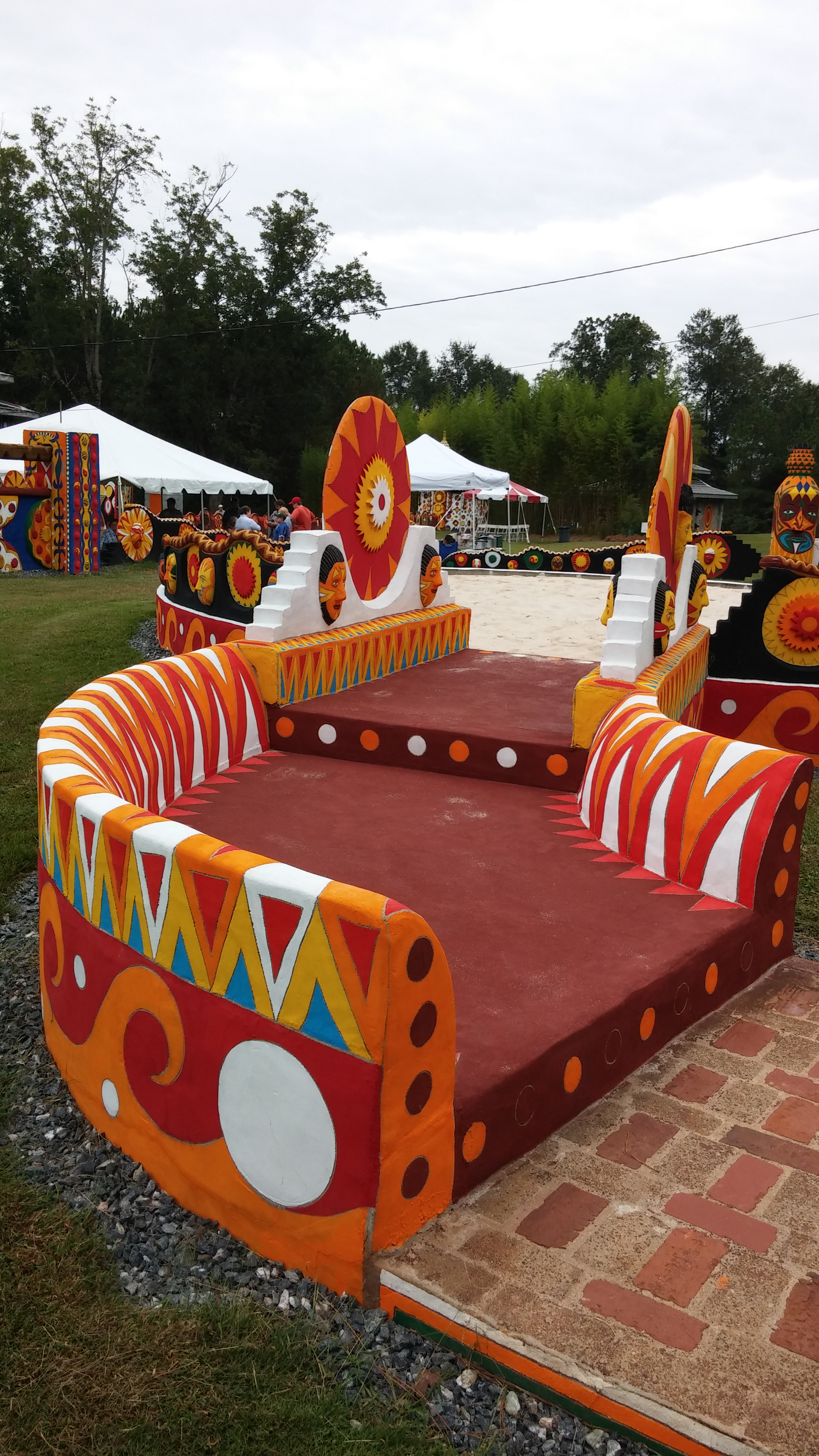
Pasaquan interior walkway

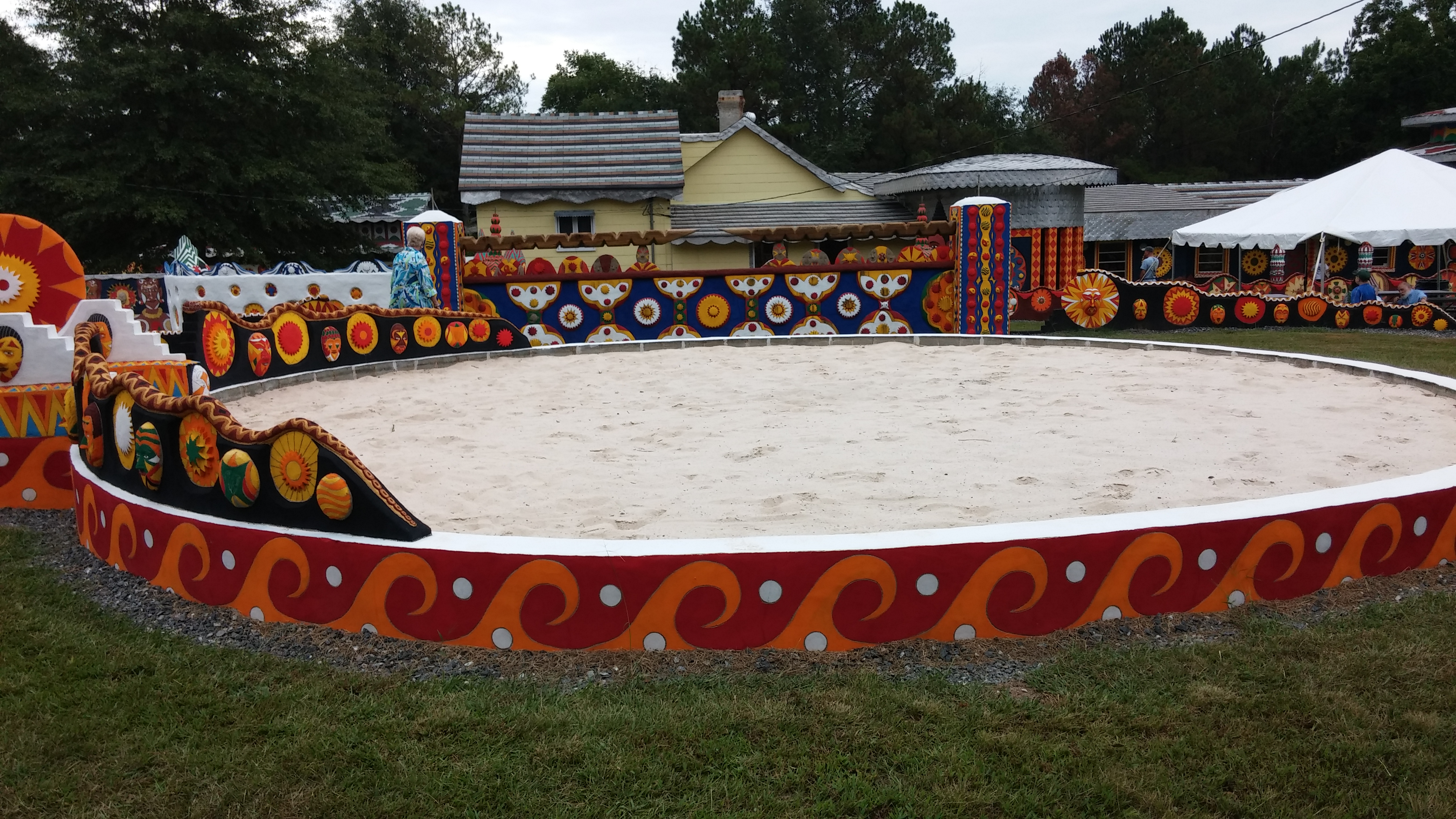
Pasaquan ceremonial ring

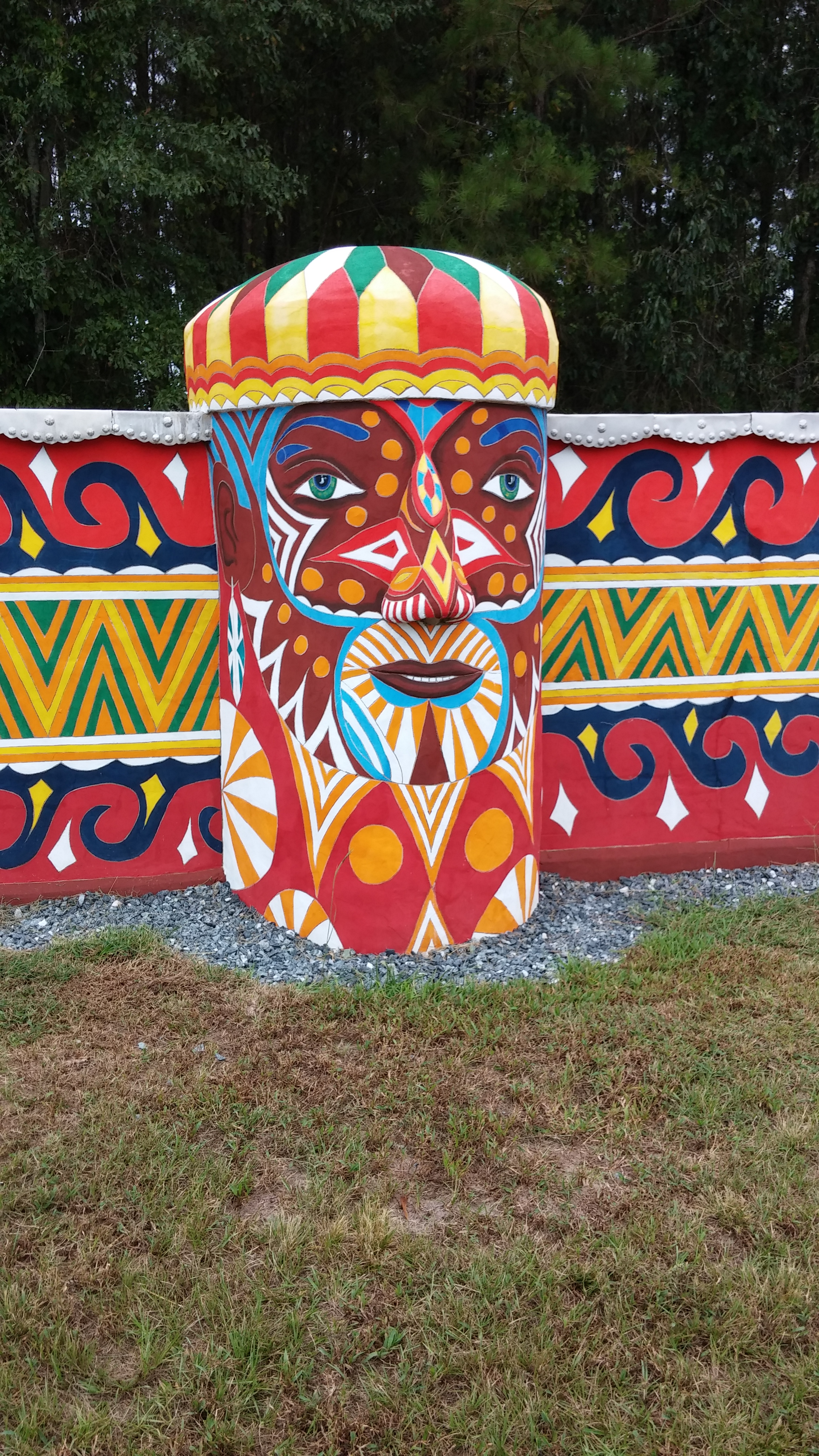
Pasaquan wall totem

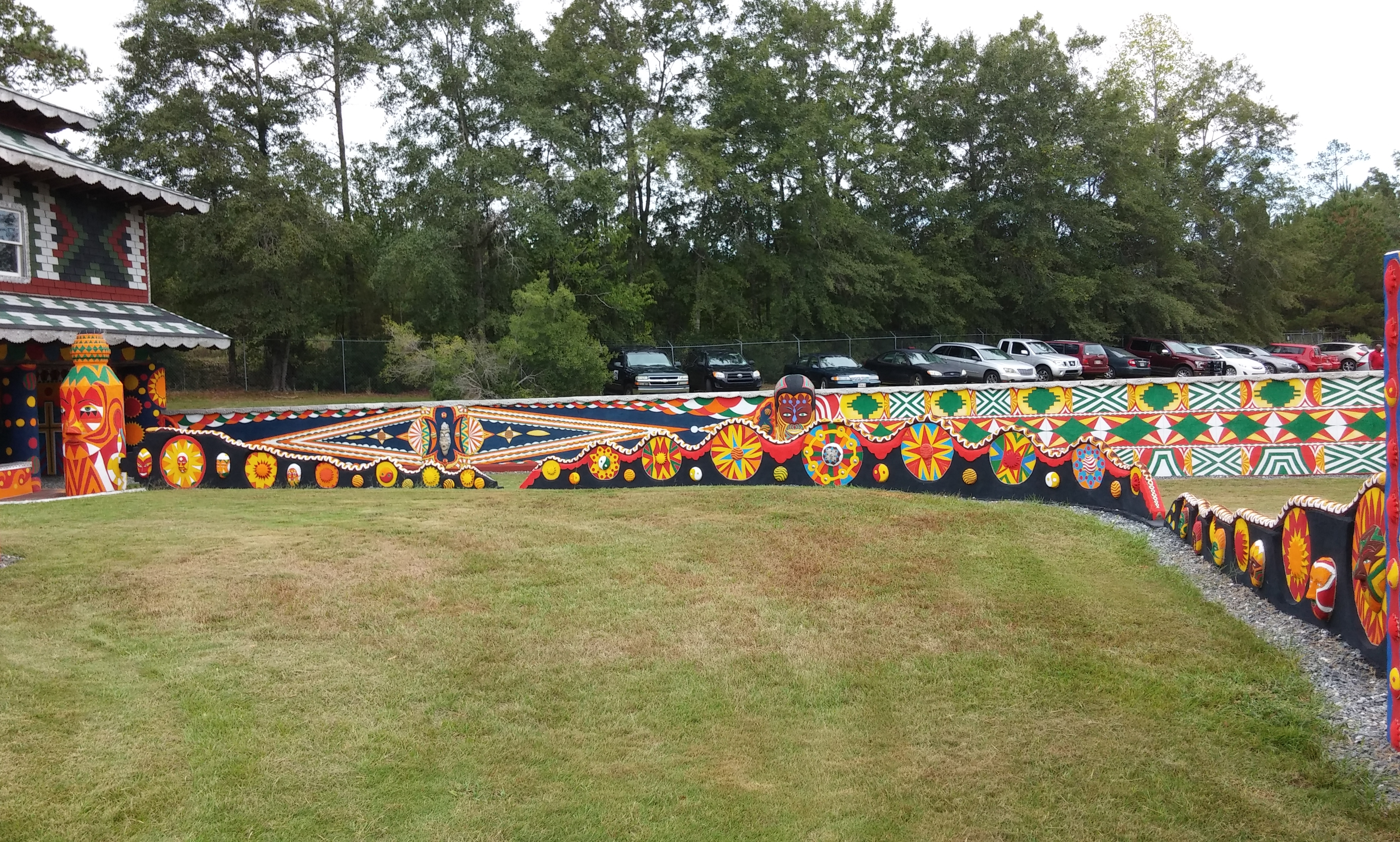
Pasaquan wall exterior in interior view

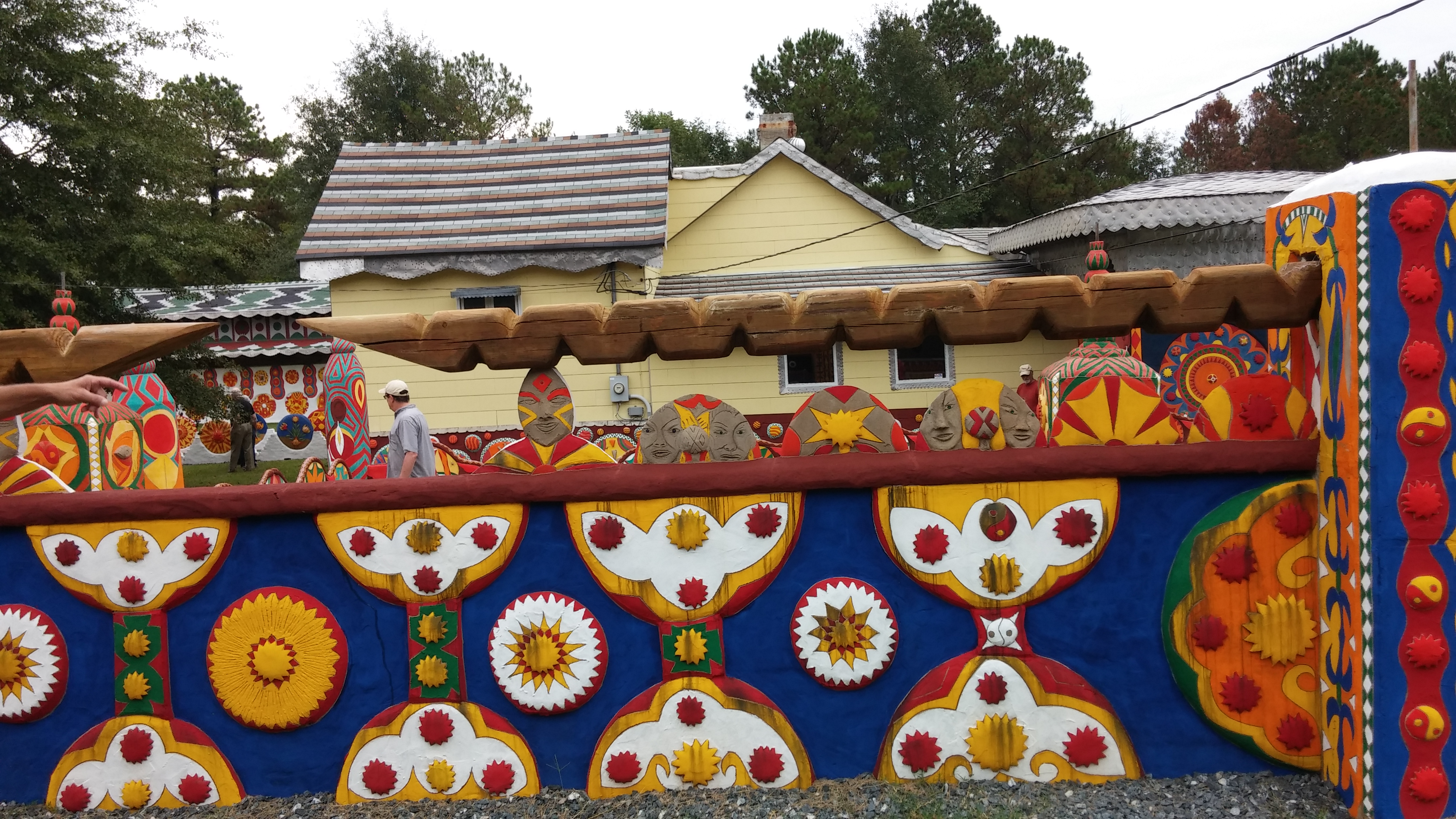
Pasaquan wall design with exterior view

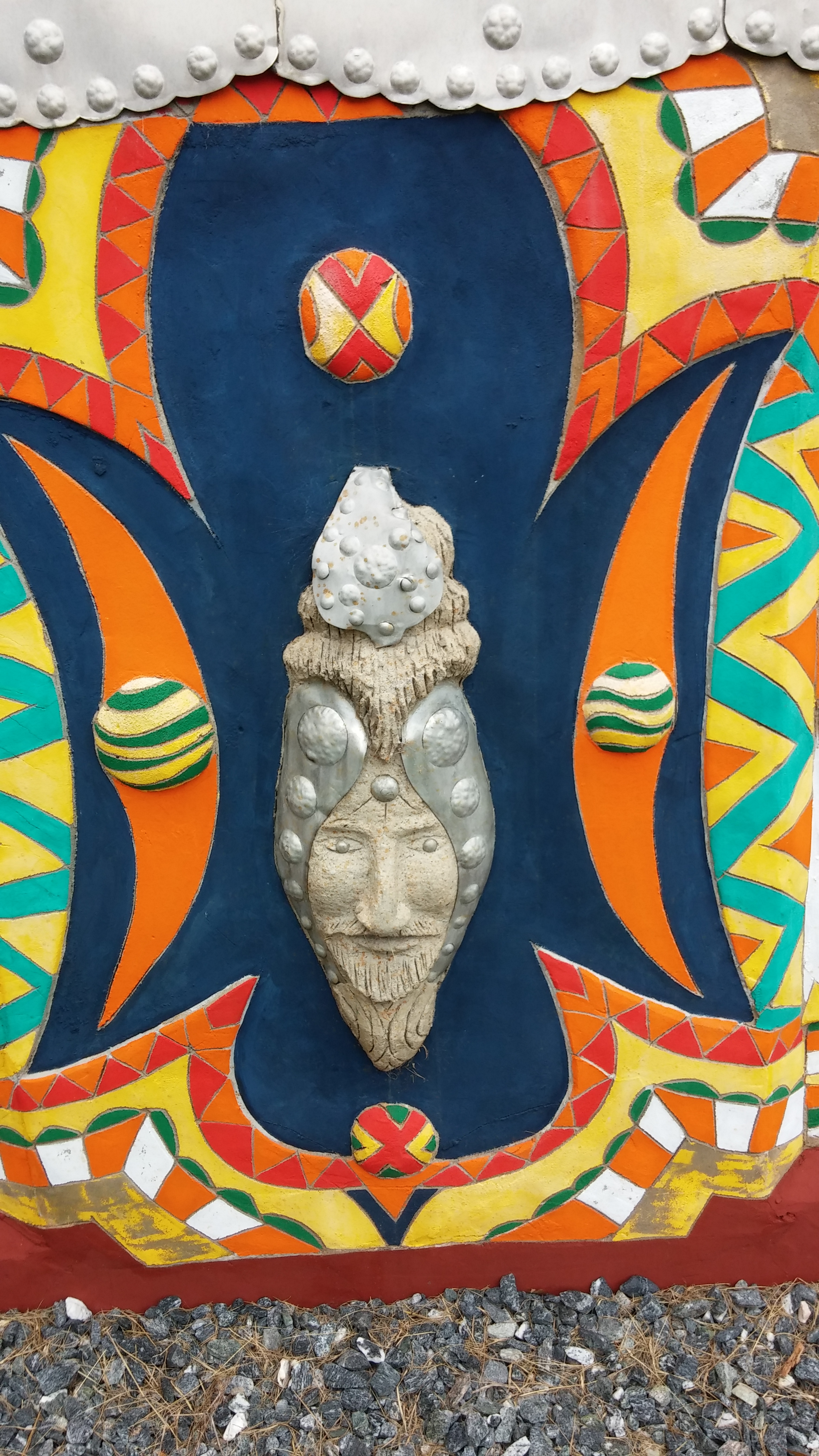
Pasaquan wall mural

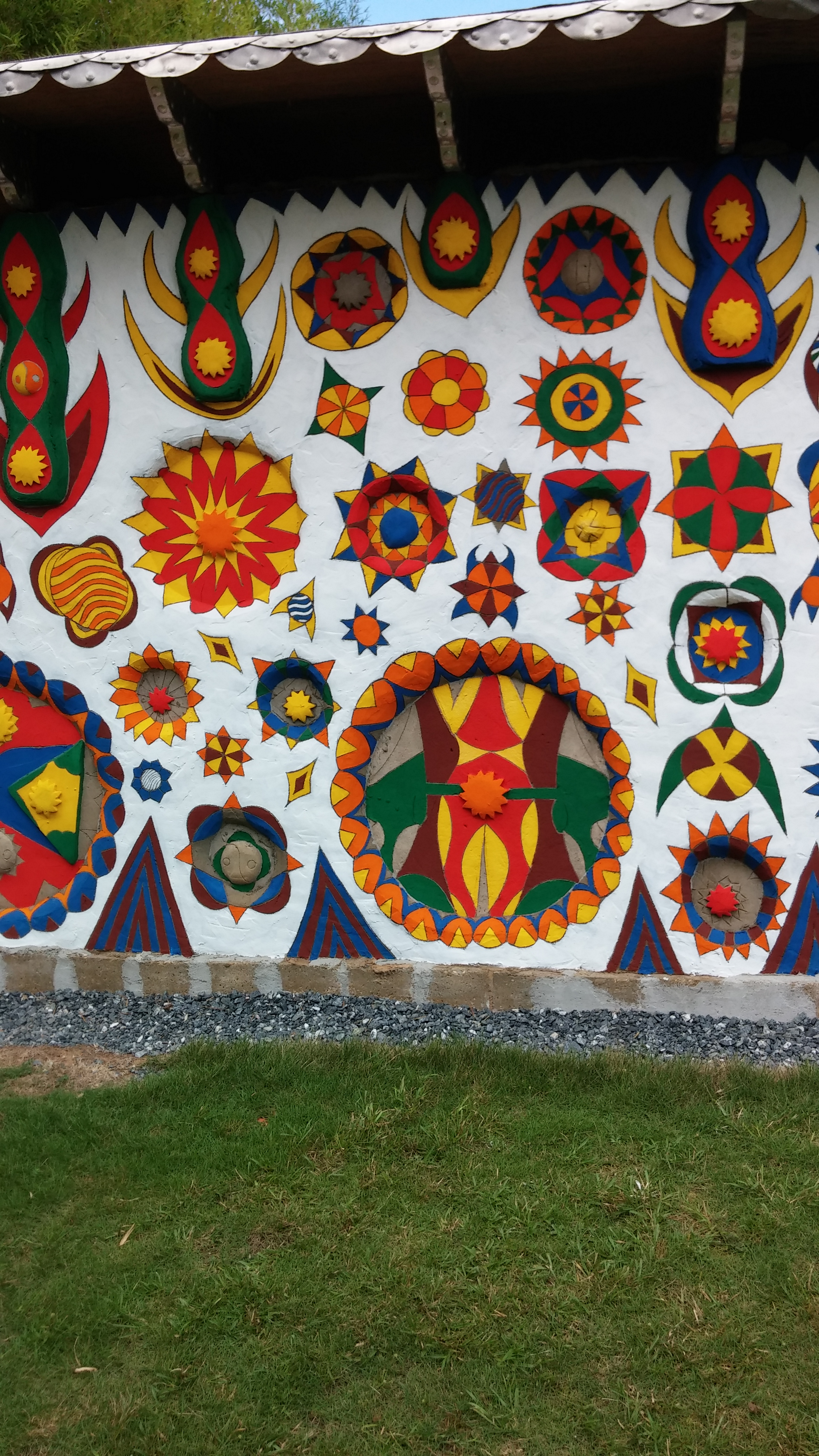
Pasaquan wall with external view

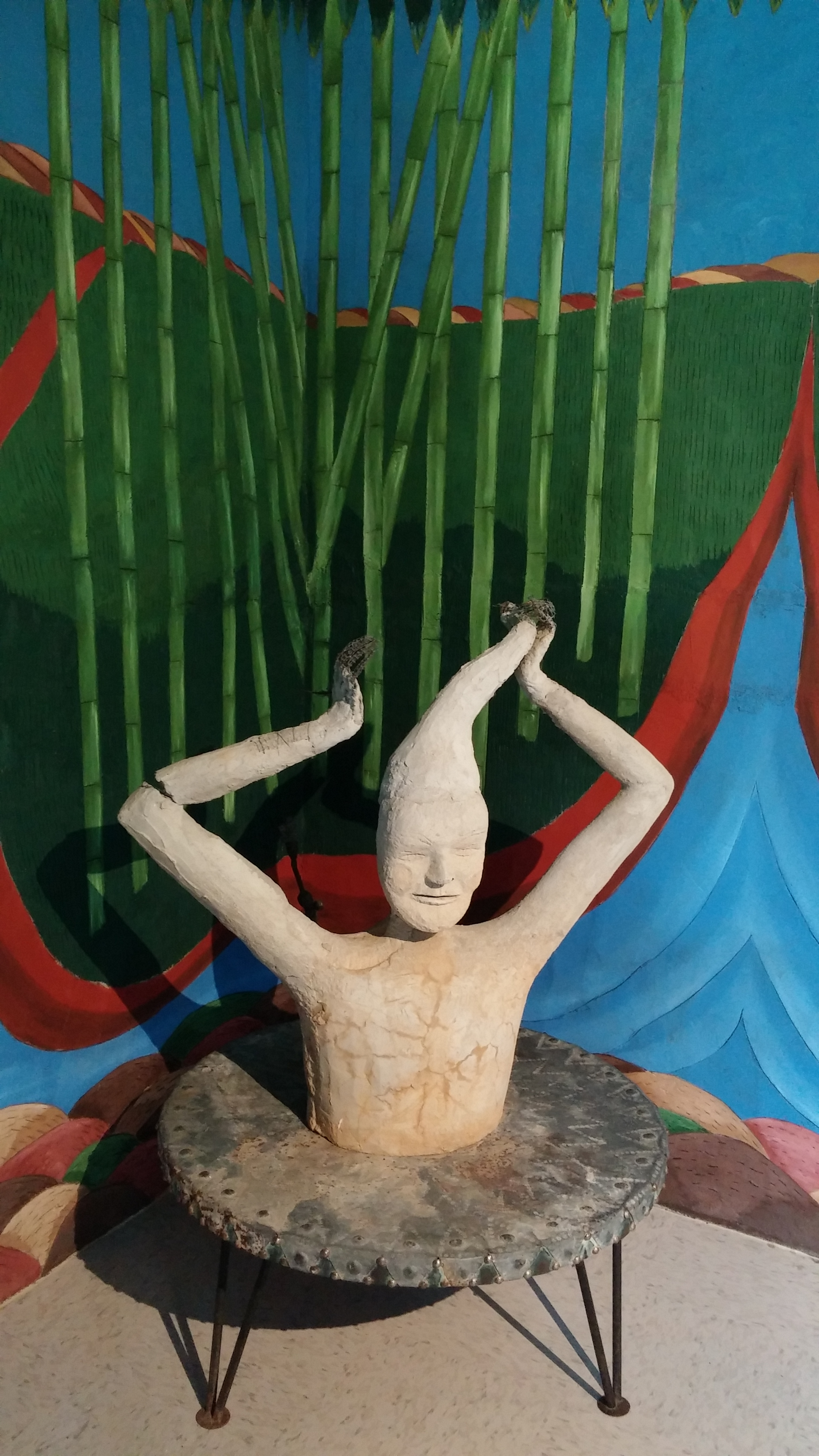
Pasaquan statue
