= Old Marion County Courthouse (Georgia) =

- U.S. National Register of Historic Places
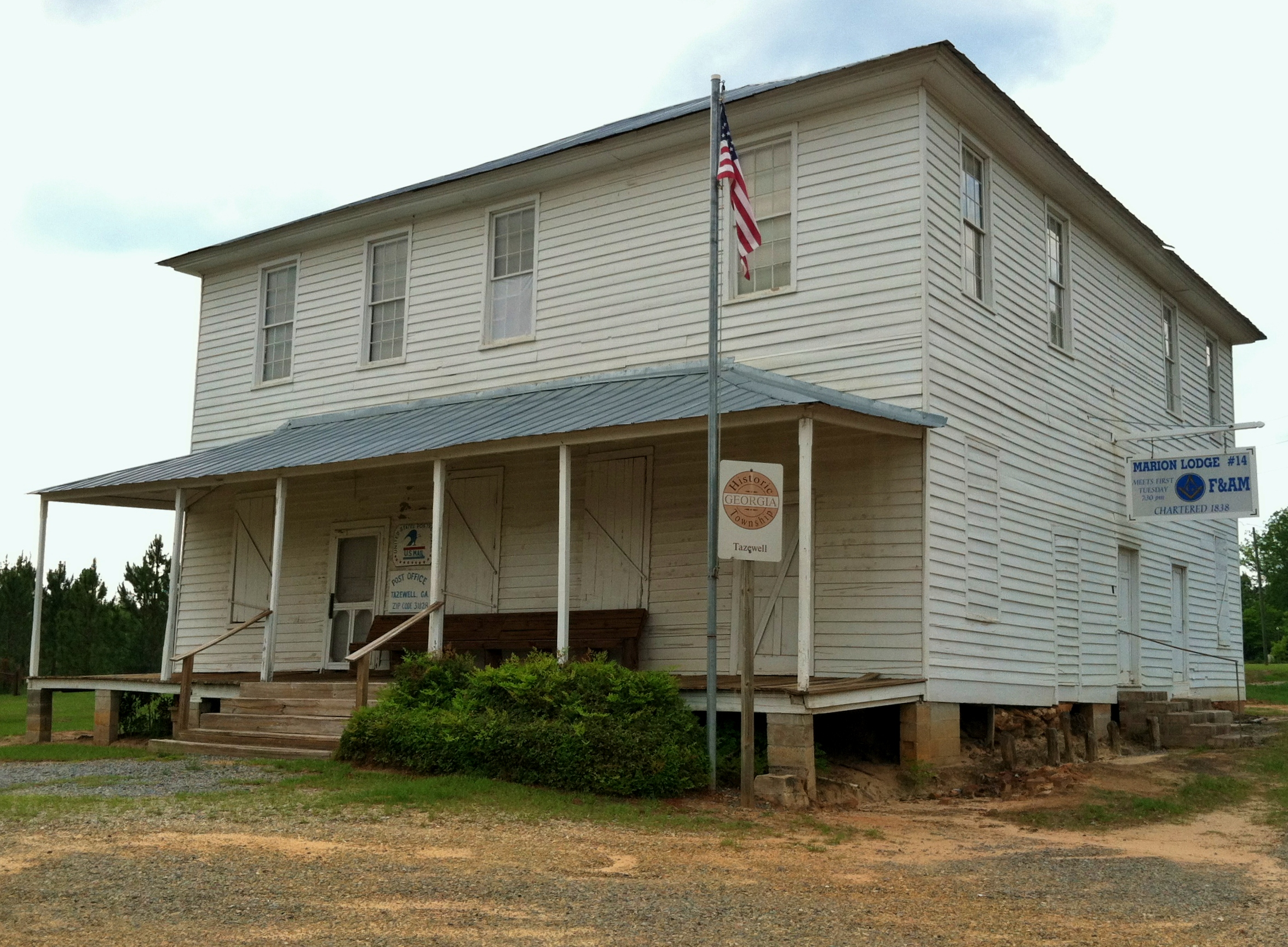

- Location within Georgia Location within the United States
- Location: Georgia State Route 137, Tazewell, Georgia
- Coordinates: 32°22′50″N 84°26′27″W
- Area: less than one acre
- Built: 1848
- Architect: L.W. Wall
- Architectural style: Carpenter
- MPS: Georgia County Courthouses TR
- NRHP reference No.: 80001116
- Added to NRHP: September 18, 1980

The Old Marion County Courthouse is a historic county courthouse building in Tazewell, Georgia, which served as the county seat of Marion County, Georgia for a short time. It was built in 1848. The county seat was moved in 1850 to what is now Buena Vista, Georgia. The site is commemorated with a historical marker. The building has also served as Marion Lodge No. 14 F. & A.M. (Free and Accepted Masons).

The building was added to the National Register of Historic Places in 1980 and is located on Georgia State Route 137.

== See also ==
- National Register of Historic Places listings in Marion County, Georgia
- Old Chattahoochee County Courthouse - similar courthouse
