= Tazewell, Georgia =

- Unincorporated community Census-designated place
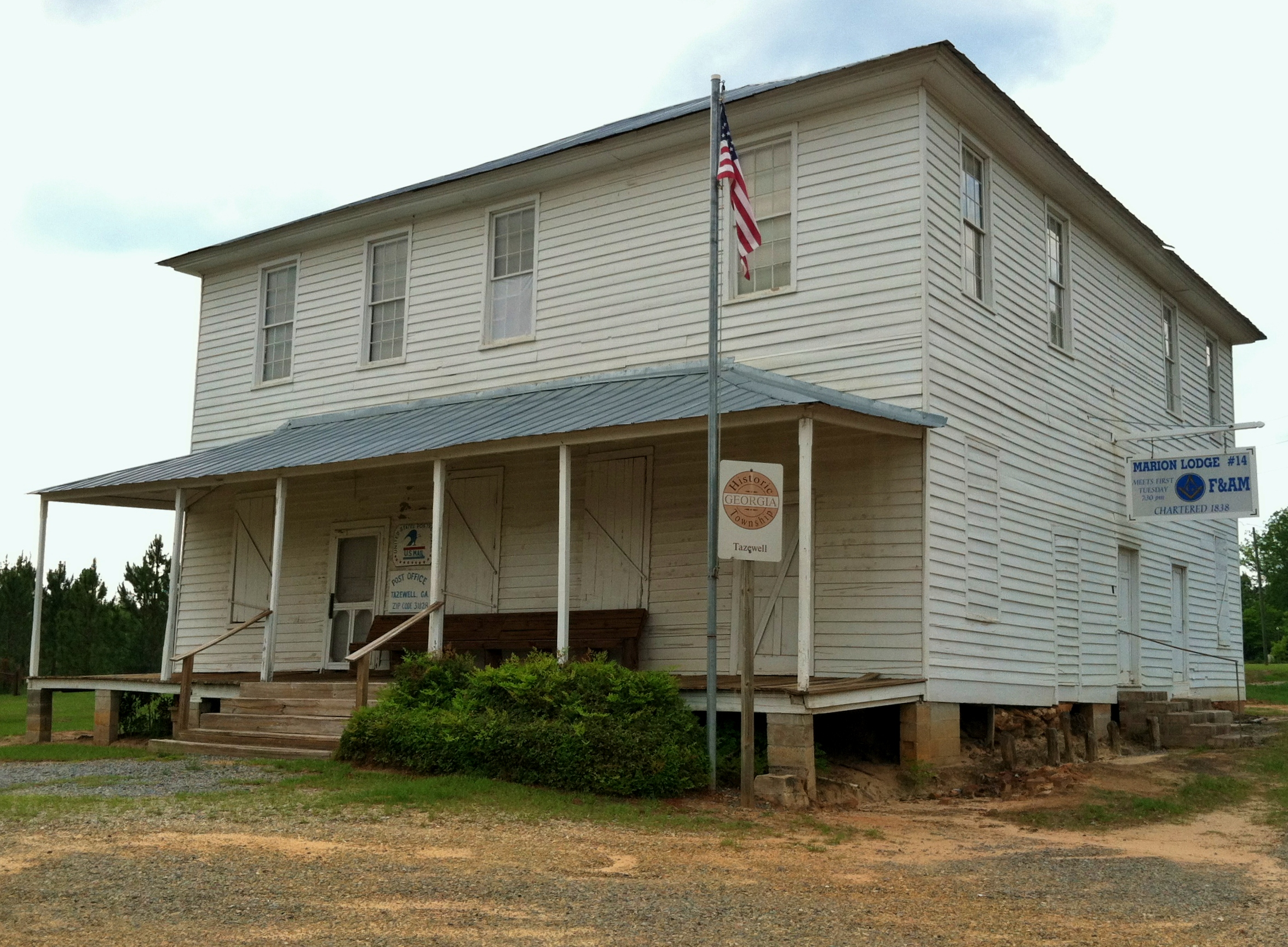
- The Old Marion County Courthouse is located in Tazewell. It was built in 1848 and added to the National Register of Historic Places in 1980.

- Location within Georgia Location within the United States
- Coordinates: 32°22′50″N 84°26′27″W
- Country: United States
- State: Georgia
- County: Marion

Area
  - Total: 1.59 sq mi (4.1 km^{2})
  - Land: 1.59 sq mi (4.1 km^{2})
  - Water: 0.01 sq mi (0.026 km^{2})
- Elevation: 487 ft (148 m)

Population (2020)
  - Total: 93
  - Density: 58.6/sq mi (22.6/km^{2})
- Time zone: UTC−6 (Central (CST))
  - Summer (DST): UTC−5 (CDT)
- ZIP Code: 31803
- FIPS code: 13-75692
- GNIS feature ID: 356586

Tazewell is an unincorporated community and census-designated place (CDP) in Marion County, in the U.S. state of Georgia.

The 2020 census, listed a population of 93.

== History ==
A post office called Tazewell was established in 1837, and remained in operation until 1985. The community was named after Henry Tazewell, a United States senator from Virginia, state legislator and judge. Tazewell was named the county seat of Marion County in 1838. The Old Marion County Courthouse still stands at Tazewell and was added to the National Register of Historic Places on September 18, 1980.

A variant spelling was "Tazwell" (without the E). The Georgia General Assembly incorporated the place as the "Town of Tazwell" in 1854. Tazewell today is an unincorporated area.

== Geography ==
Tazewell is in eastern Marion County, in the valley of Shoal Creek. State Routes 137 and 240 cross in the center of town. SR 137 leads southwest 6 miles (10 km) to Buena Vista, the county seat, and northeast 18 miles (29 km) to Butler, while SR 240 leads east 26 miles (42 km) to Oglethorpe and north 18 miles (29 km) to Geneva.

According to the U.S. Census Bureau, the Tazewell CDP has a total area of 1.6 square miles (4.1 km^{2}), of which 0.01 square miles (6.4 acres), or 0.50%, are water. Shoal Creek and Gin Creek join at the southern edge of the community to form Buck Creek, which flows east to the Flint River at Oglethorpe.

== Demographics ==
Historical population
Census	Pop.	Note	%±
2020	93		—
U.S. Decennial Census; 2020

Tazewell was first listed as a census designated place in the 2020 U.S. census.

Tazewell CDP, Georgia – Racial and ethnic composition Note: the US Census treats Hispanic/Latino as an ethnic category. This table excludes Latinos from the racial categories and assigns them to a separate category. Hispanics/Latinos may be of any race.
Race / Ethnicity (NH = Non-Hispanic)	Pop 2020	% 2020
White alone (NH)	87	93.55%
Black or African American alone (NH)	0	0.00%
Native American or Alaska Native alone (NH)	0	0.00%
Asian alone (NH)	0	0.00%
Pacific Islander alone (NH)	0	0.00%
Some Other Race alone (NH)	0	0.00%
Mixed Race or Multi-Racial (NH)	1	1.08%
Hispanic or Latino (any race)	5	5.38%
Total	93	100.00%
