= Buena Vista, Georgia =

- City
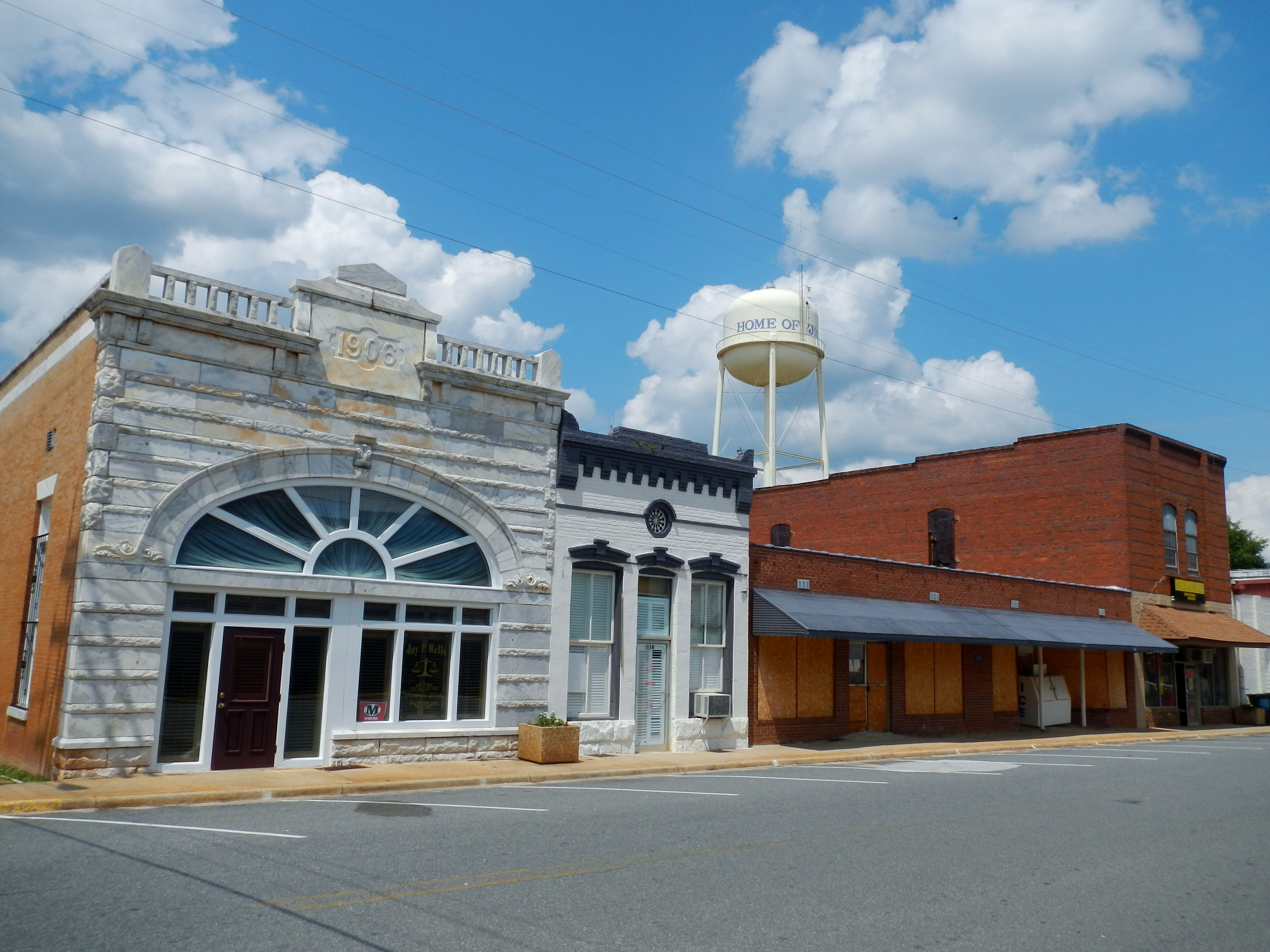
- Buena Vista in 2012

- Location in Marion County and the state of Georgia
- Coordinates: 32°19′6″N 84°30′58″W
- Country: United States
- State: Georgia
- County: Marion

Area
  - Total: 3.27 sq mi (8.48 km^{2})
  - Land: 3.22 sq mi (8.34 km^{2})
  - Water: 0.054 sq mi (0.14 km^{2})
- Elevation: 719 ft (219 m)

Population (2020)
  - Total: 1,585
  - Density: 492.4/sq mi (190.11/km^{2})
- Time zone: UTC-5 (Eastern (EST))
  - Summer (DST): UTC-4 (EDT)
- ZIP code: 31803
- Area code: 229
- FIPS code: 13-11728
- GNIS feature ID: 0354903
- Website: https://www.cityofbuenavista.org/

Buena Vista (/ˌbjuːnə ˈvɪstə/ BEW-nə VIST-ə) is a city in Marion County, Georgia, United States. It is part of the Columbus, Georgia metropolitan area. The population was 1,585 at the 2020 census, down from 2,173 in 2010. Formerly known as "Pea Ridge", the city changed its name to Buena Vista in honor of Zachary Taylor's victory in the Mexican–American War. The city is the county seat of Marion County. It is the birthplace of baseball legend Josh Gibson and Medal of Honor recipient Luther H. Story.

== History ==
Buena Vista was first settled in 1818 by settlers from Georgia. A postal office was established in 1837, and it was incorporated as a town. In 1850, the seat of Marion County was transferred to Buena Vista from Tazewell. Buena Vista was incorporated as a city in 1891, and again in 1920. In 1906, a major fire destroyed much of Buena Vista, however it was rebuilt with brick soon after. Following the fire, the town received an influx of European immigrants.

== Geography ==
Buena Vista is in central Marion County in western Georgia. Georgia State Routes 26 and 41 cross in the center of town. SR 26 leads west 16 miles (26 km) to Cusseta and southeast 14 miles (23 km) to Ellaville, while SR 41 leads north 19 miles (31 km) to Geneva and south 19 miles (31 km) to Preston. State Route 137 leads northeast 6 miles (10 km) to Tazewell and west-northwest 7 miles (11 km) to Union.

According to the United States Census Bureau, Buena Vista has a total area of 3.3 square miles (8.5 km^{2}), of which 0.06 square miles (0.16 km^{2}), or 1.68%, are water. The city is part of the Flint River watershed. Sitting atop a ridge, it is drained by three separate stream systems. To the northeast is Oochee Creek, an east-flowing tributary of Buck Creek, which runs to the Flint River at Montezuma. The southeast part of the city drains to Muckalee Creek, which joins the Flint River at Albany. The west side of Buena Vista drains to Peacock Ditch, a tributary of Kinchafoonee Creek, which joins Muckalee Creek at Albany.

== Demographics ==
Historical population
Census	Pop.	Note	%±
1850	530		—
1870	525		—
1880	529		0.8%
1890	788		49.0%
1900	1,161		47.3%
1910	1,016		−12.5%
1920	1,230		21.1%
1930	1,097		−10.8%
1940	1,161		5.8%
1950	1,428		23.0%
1960	1,574		10.2%
1970	1,486		−5.6%
1980	1,544		3.9%
1990	1,472		−4.7%
2000	1,664		13.0%
2010	2,173		30.6%
2020	1,585		−27.1%
U.S. Decennial Census; 1850-1870 1870-1880; 1890-1910 1920-1930; 1940 1950 1960; 1970 1980 1990; 2000 2010

=== 2020 census ===
As of the 2020 census, Buena Vista had a population of 1,585. The median age was 37.9 years. 25.7% of residents were under the age of 18 and 17.2% of residents were 65 years of age or older. For every 100 females there were 94.2 males, and for every 100 females age 18 and over there were 87.4 males age 18 and over.

0.0% of residents lived in urban areas, while 100.0% lived in rural areas.

There were 601 households in Buena Vista, of which 35.8% had children under the age of 18 living in them. Of all households, 24.5% were married-couple households, 24.0% were households with a male householder and no spouse or partner present, and 47.9% were households with a female householder and no spouse or partner present. About 37.1% of all households were made up of individuals and 15.8% had someone living alone who was 65 years of age or older.

There were 478 families residing in the city.

There were 717 housing units, of which 16.2% were vacant. The homeowner vacancy rate was 2.0% and the rental vacancy rate was 3.7%.

Buena Vista racial composition as of 2020
Race	Num.	Perc.
White (non-Hispanic)	317	20.0%
Black or African American (non-Hispanic)	970	61.2%
Native American	1	0.06%
Asian	8	0.5%
Other/Mixed	17	1.07%
Hispanic or Latino	272	17.16%

== Education ==
Marion County School District serves pre-school to grade twelve, and consists of one primary school (grades: pre-k through 5th) and a middle/high school (grades: 6th-12th). The district has 108 full-time teachers and over 1,686 students.

- L. K. Moss Primary School
- Marion County Middle High School

The Marion County School District is in the process of opening a new middle/high school. The 146,000-square-foot (13,600 m^{2}) structure will sit on 200 acres of land in the middle of the county and is scheduled to open for the 2012–13 school year.

== Infrastructure ==
The city is served by Georgia State Route 26, Georgia State Route 41, and Georgia State Route 137.

== Notable people ==
- Josh Gibson, Negro leagues baseball player and Hall of Famer
- Roosevelt Jackson, oldest living Negro leagues baseball player (minor leagues only)
- Eddie Owens Martin, creator of Pasaquan
- Luther H. Story, Korean War Medal of Honor recipient

== Gallery ==
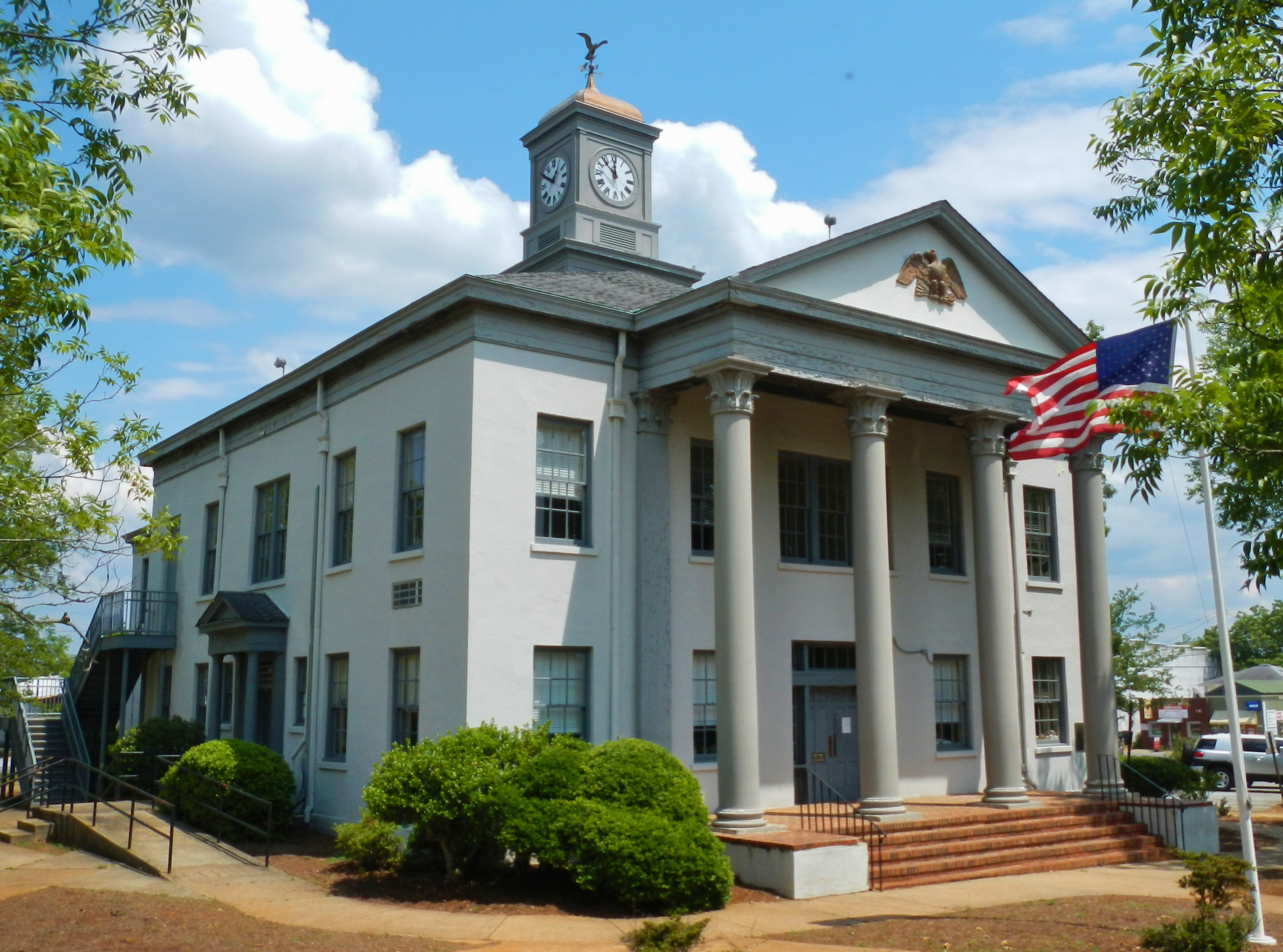
The Marion County Courthouse is located in Buena Vista. It was added to the National Register of Historic Places on September 18, 1980.

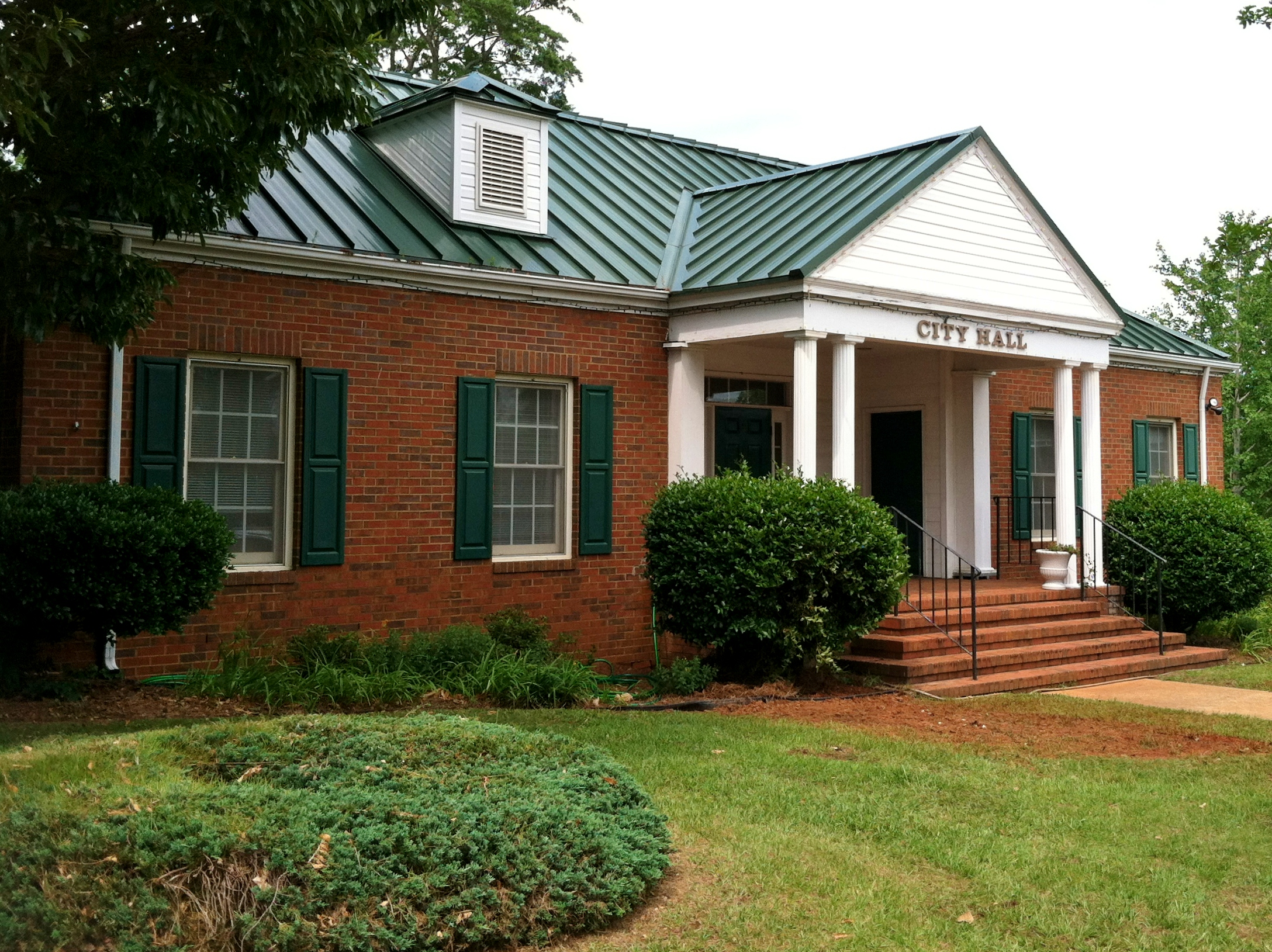
Buena Vista City Hall

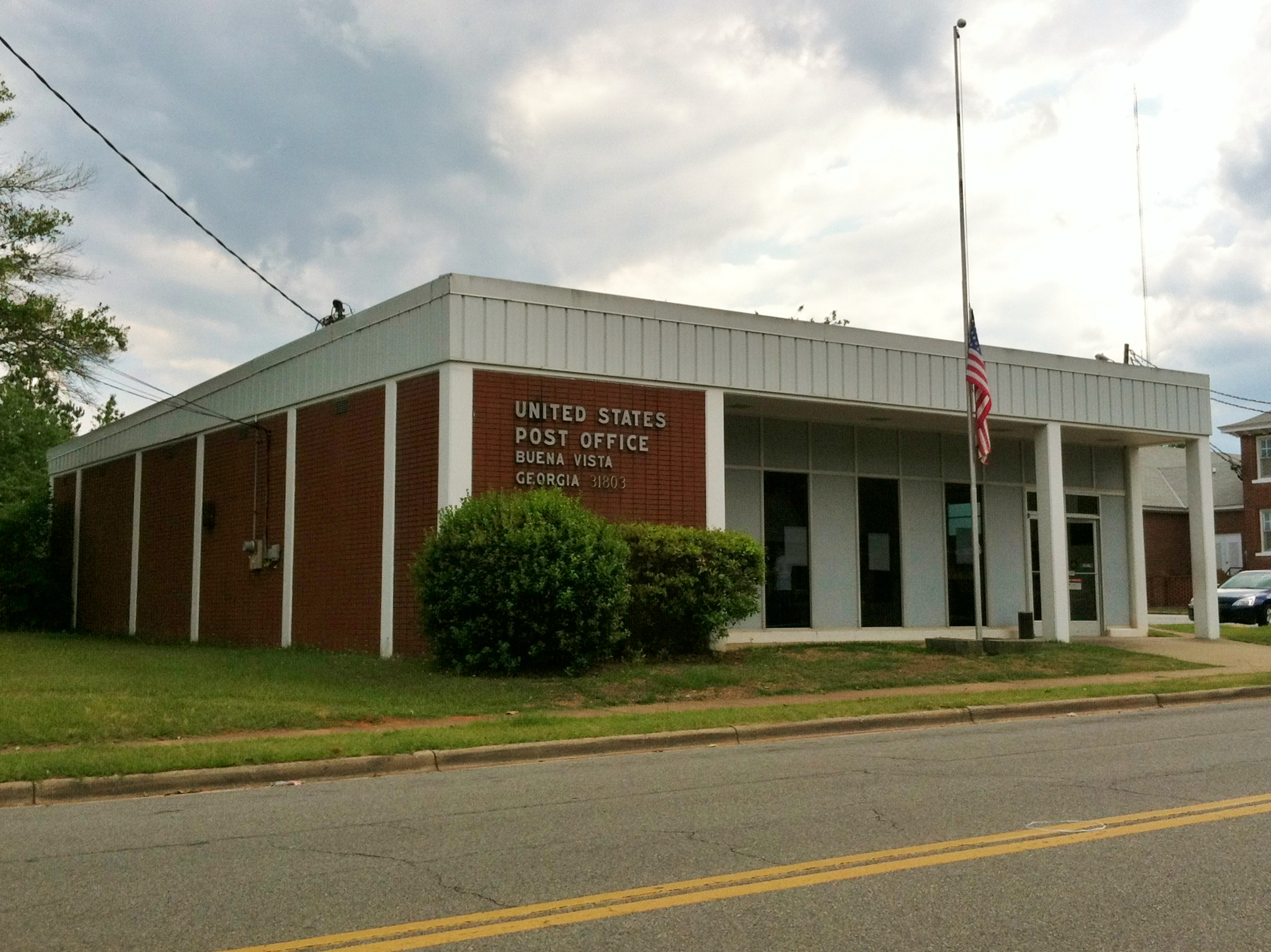
Buena Vista Post Office (ZIP code: 31803)

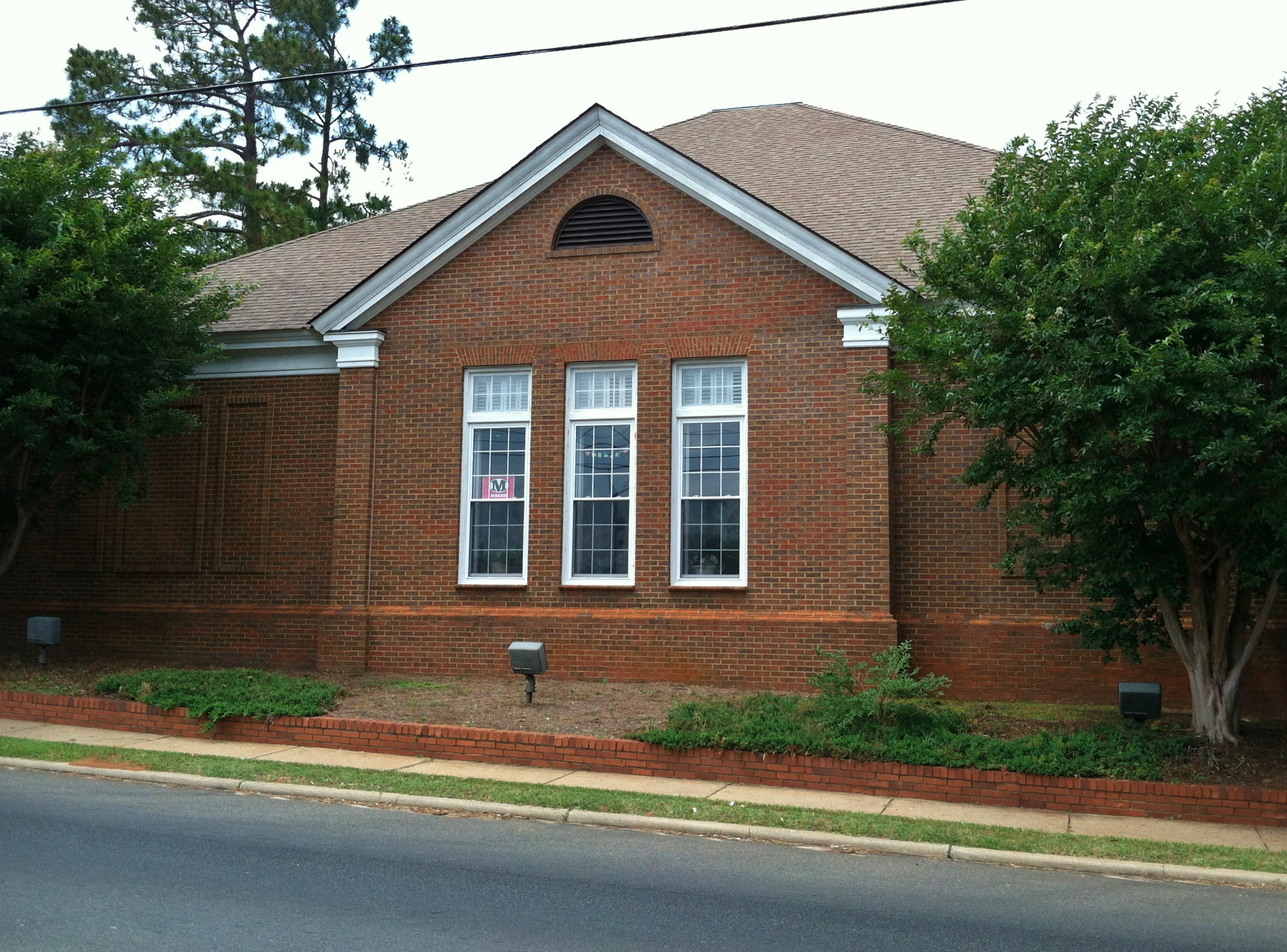
Marion County Public Library

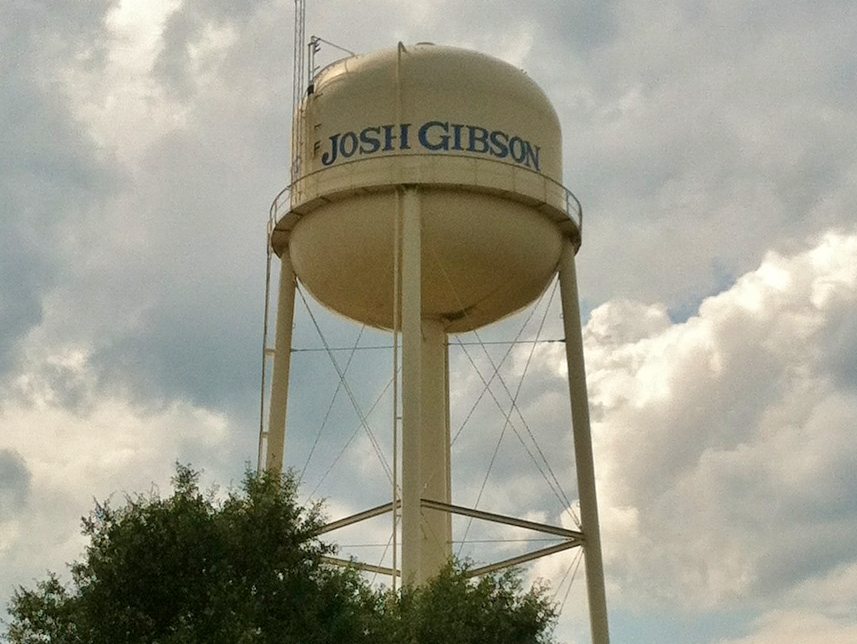
A water tower in Buena Vista proudly proclaims the town to be the "Home of Josh Gibson". The Hall of Famer was born in Buena Vista on December 21, 1911.

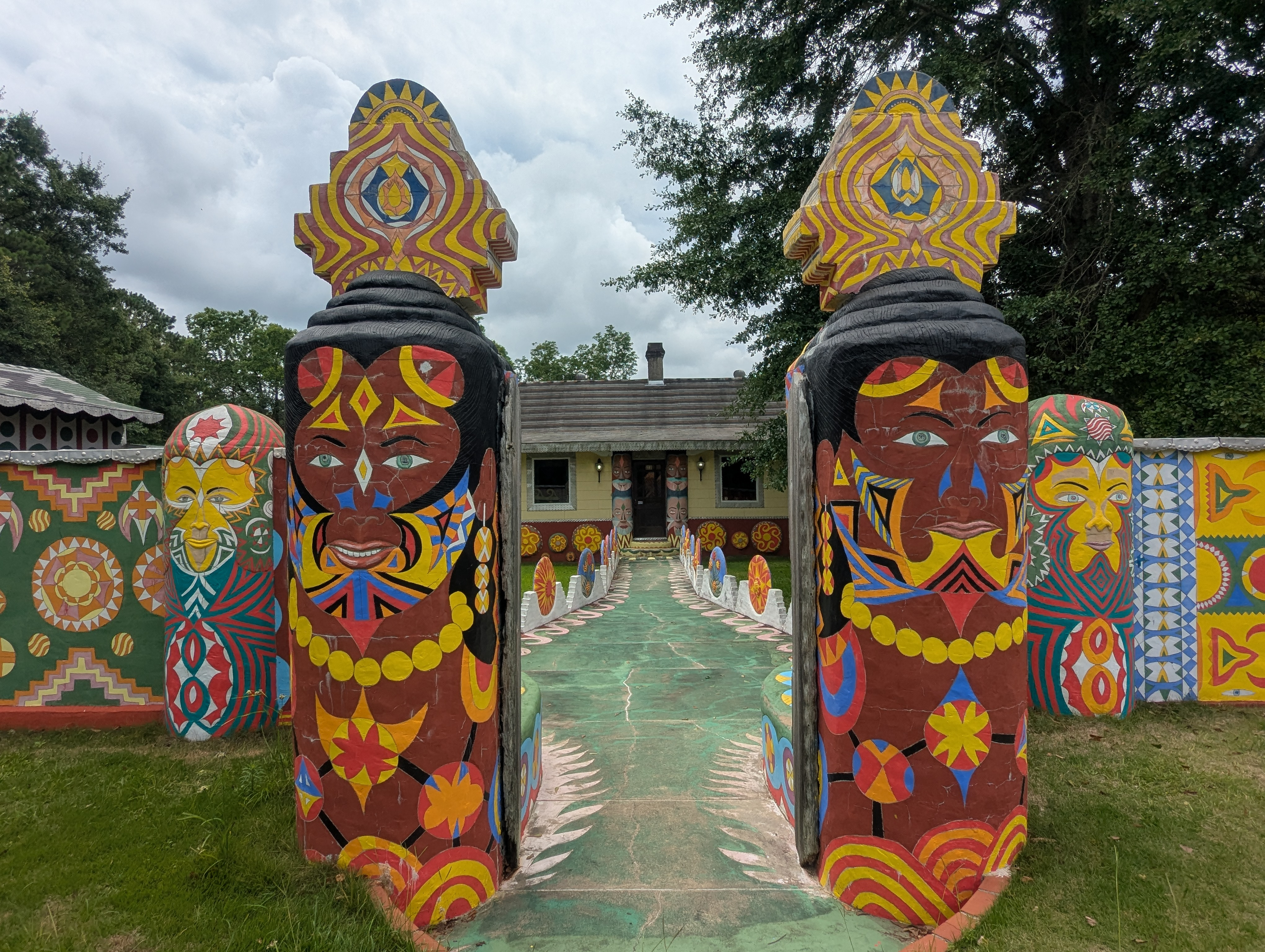
"Pasaquan" is a seven-acre compound near Buena Vista created by outsider artist Eddie Owens Martin (1908–1986), known as "St. EOM". The site is maintained by the Pasaquan Preservation Society. It was added to the National Register of Historic Places on August 27, 2008.

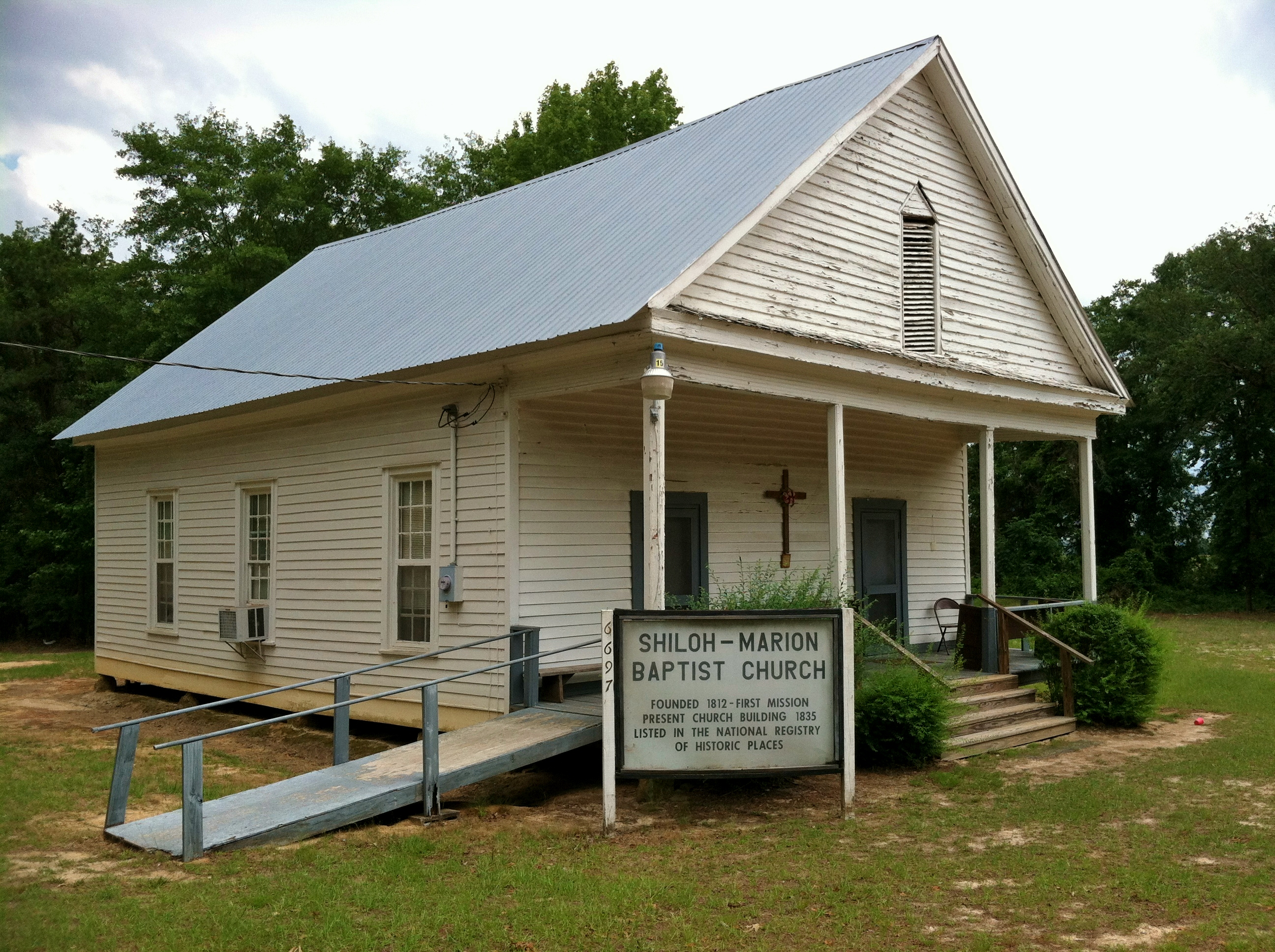
The Shiloh-Marion Baptist Church and Cemetery, located just south of Buena Vista near the Webster County line, was added to the National Register of Historic Places on May 17, 1984.

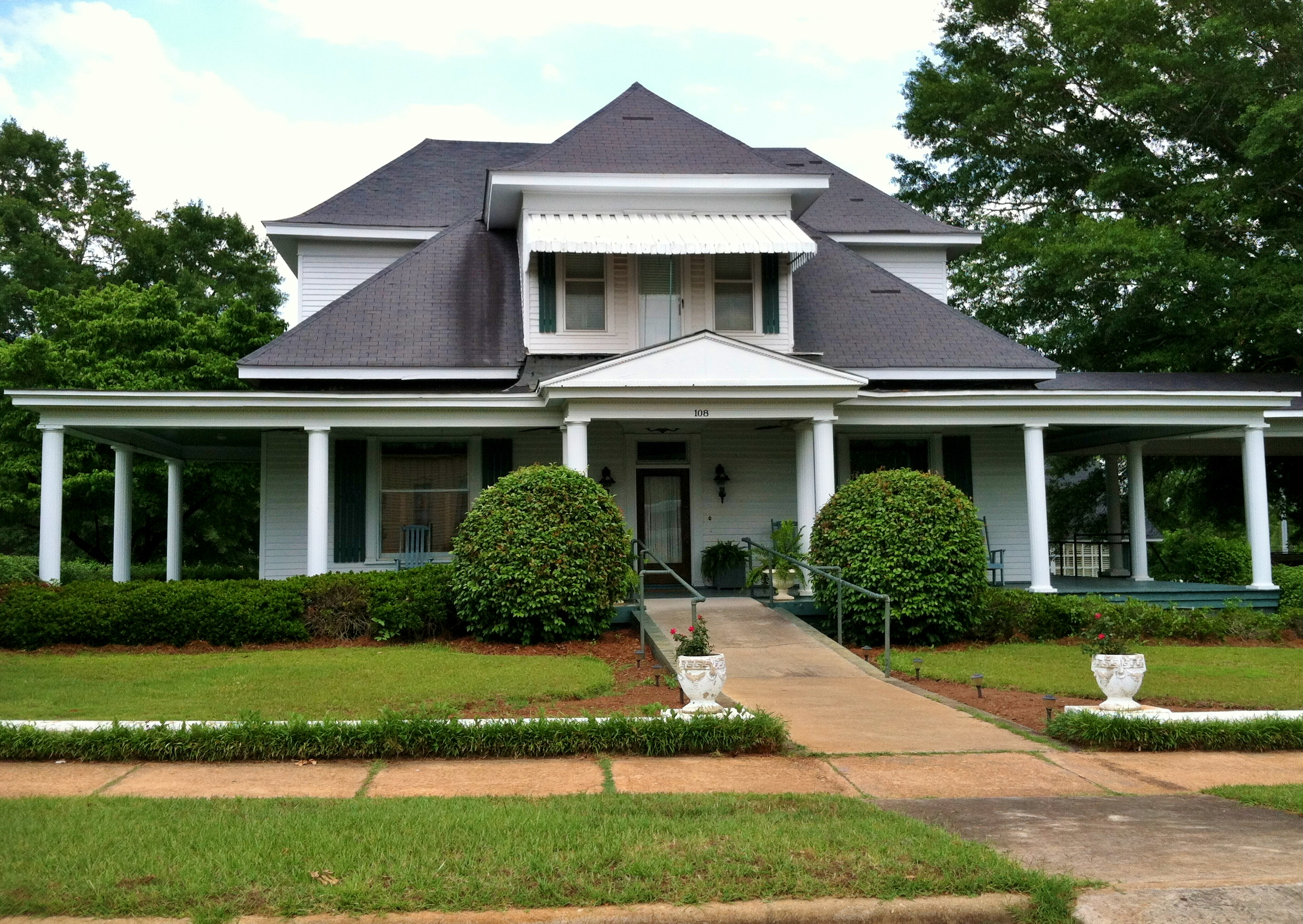
The Drane-Stevens House, located in Buena Vista, was added to the National Register of Historic Places on July 28, 1999.

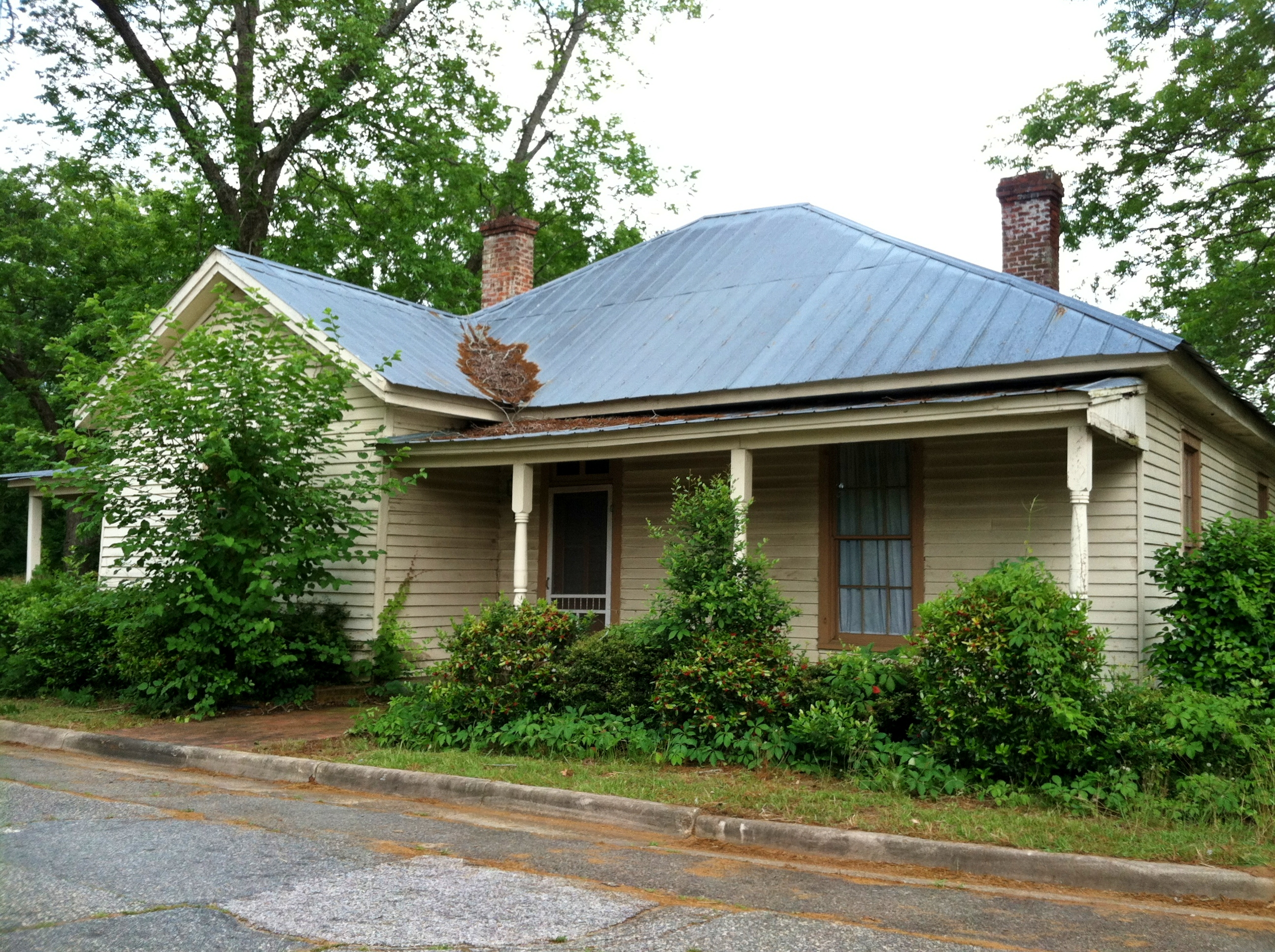
The Alfred and Jane Ables House, located in Buena Vista, was added to the National Register of Historic Places on August 9, 2002.
