= National Register of Historic Places listings in Crisp County, Georgia =

This is a list of properties and districts in Crisp County, Georgia that are listed on the National Register of Historic Places (NRHP).

This National Park Service list is complete through NPS recent listings posted May 1, 2026.

== Current listings ==
	Name on the Register	Image	Date listed	Location	City or town	Description
1	Cannon Site		September 5, 1975 (#75000587)	Address Restricted	Cordele	Prehistoric graves, on private land
2	Cordele Commercial Historic District	Cordele Commercial Historic District	July 6, 1989 (#89000803)	Roughly bounded by Sixth Ave., Sixth St., Ninth Ave., and Fourteenth St. 31°58′12″N 83°46′57″W	Cordele	Includes a 1907 Masonic Lodge designed in Beaux Arts style by architect T. Firth Lockwood, Sr.
3	Gillespie-Selden Historic District		December 2, 1998 (#97000336)	Roughly bounded by Railroad, 10th, and 15th Sts., and 16th Ave. 31°57′55″N 83°47′27″W	Cordele	African-American neighborhood, including the Gillespie-Selden Institute
4	O'Neal School Neighborhood Historic District		October 6, 2004 (#04000339)	Roughly bounded by the Seaboard Coastline Railroad, Owens St. 16th Ave. and 6th St. 31°57′59″N 83°46′31″W	Cordele	
5	US Post Office-Cordele	US Post Office-Cordele	June 29, 1984 (#84000977)	102-104 6th St. 31°58′08″N 83°46′53″W	Cordele	
