= Webster County Jails =

- U.S. National Register of Historic Places
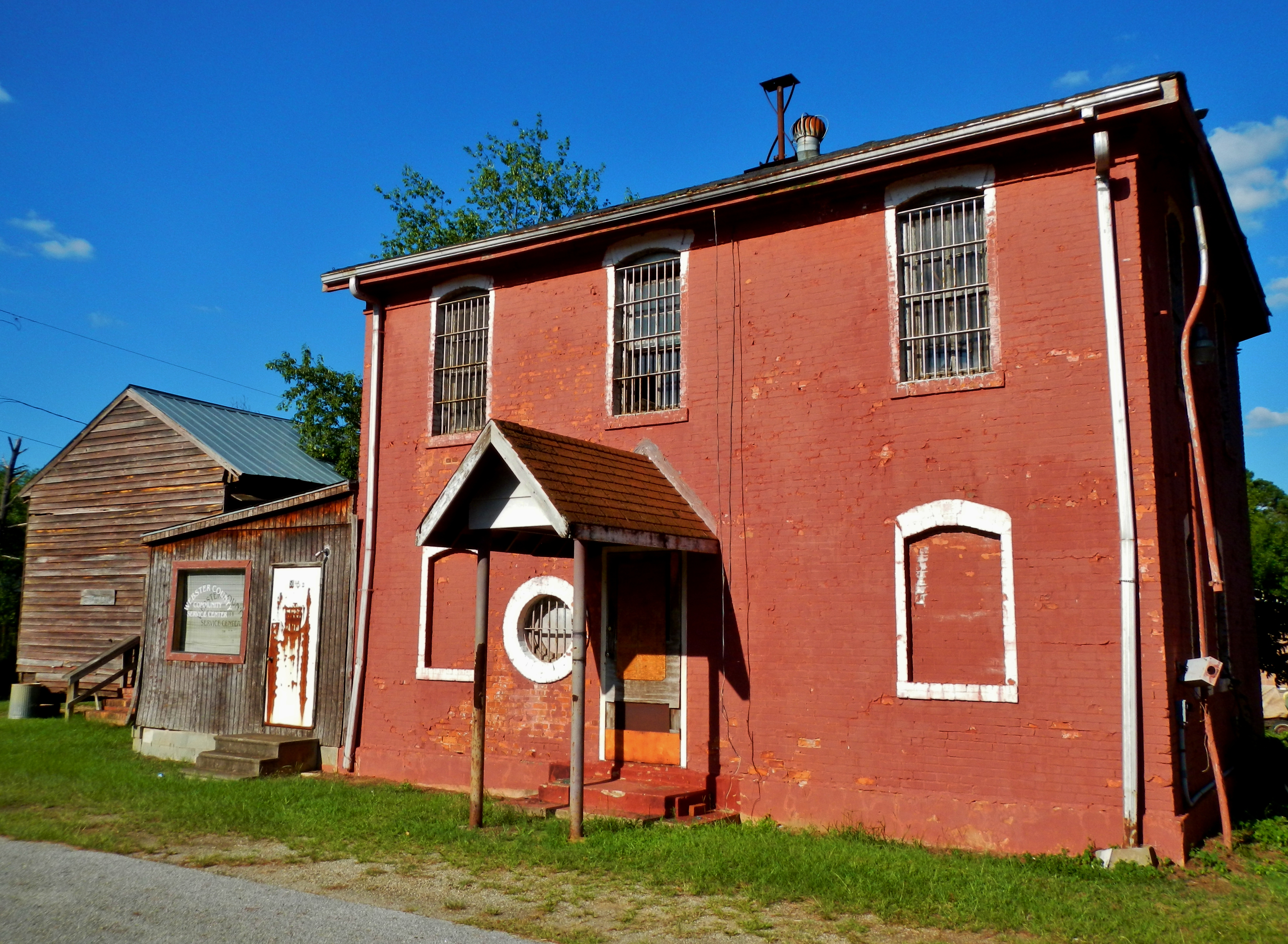

- Location within Georgia
- Location: Unnamed city street at the jct. of Cass St. and Old Post Office Rd., Preston, Georgia
- Coordinates: 32°03′59″N 84°32′09″W
- Area: 1 acre (0.40 ha)
- Built: c.1856, c.1910
- Built by: Stewart Jail Works Co.
- Architectural style: Late Victorian
- NRHP reference No.: 00000152
- Added to NRHP: March 3, 2000

The Webster County Jails, located at intersection of Montgomery St and Goare St. in Preston in Webster County, Georgia was listed on the National Register of Historic Places in 2000.

The wooden jail (pictured at left) was the first jail built for the county between 1855 and 1856. It housed prisoners until the brick jail (right) was constructed in 1910. The wooden jail that you see is the one that housed Susan Eberhart, the second and last woman hanged in the State of Georgia, from May 10, 1872, until her hanging May 2, 1873.

The Webster County Jails are located on an unnamed city street at the jct. of Cass St. and Old Post Office Rd. in Preston, Georgia.

The Old Jail and the New Jail are two contributing buildings in the listing.

The Old Webster County Jail is a one-story building built c.1856, built of 5 by 9 inches (0.13 m × 0.23 m) hand-hewn log timbers. It has been moved several times between nearby locations: in the 1950s, in 1975, in 1977, in 1995. In 1999 it was being used for storage, while there were plans to make it into a museum.

The c.1910 New Jail, built c.1910 by the Stewart Jail Works Co., is a two-story brick building upon a concrete foundation. It has brick corbeling and a string course at its cornice.

There is architecture, Late Victorian, about.

They are the only two correctional facilities built in the county.
