= Webster County School District =

Webster County School District may refer to:

- Webster County School District (Georgia)
- Webster County School District (Kentucky)
- Webster County School District (Mississippi)
