= National Register of Historic Places listings in Webster County, Georgia =

This is a list of properties and districts in Webster County, Georgia that are listed on the National Register of Historic Places (NRHP).

This National Park Service list is complete through NPS recent listings posted March 21, 2025.

== Current listings ==
	Name on the Register	Image	Date listed	Location	City or town	Description
1	Boyd Mill Place	Boyd Mill Place	September 24, 2009 (#09000752)	580 Mill Pond Rd. 31°58′08″N 84°32′41″W	Weston	Also known as "Davenport's Mill" and "Hearon's Mill".
2	Webster County Courthouse	Webster County Courthouse	September 18, 1980 (#80001262)	Courthouse Sq. 32°03′58″N 84°32′14″W	Preston	The current courthouse was built in 1915 in the Neoclassical revival style.
3	Webster County Jails	Webster County Jails	March 3, 2000 (#00000152)	Intersection of Montgomery St and Goare St. 32°03′59″N 84°32′09″W	Preston	The wooden jail (pictured at left) was the first jail built for the county between 1855 and 1856. It housed prisoners until the brick jail (right) was constructed in 1910. The wooden jail that you see is the one that housed Susan Eberhart, the second and last woman hanged in the State of Georgia, from May 10, 1872 until her hanging May 2, 1873
