= Boyd Mill Place =

- U.S. National Register of Historic Places
- U.S. Historic district
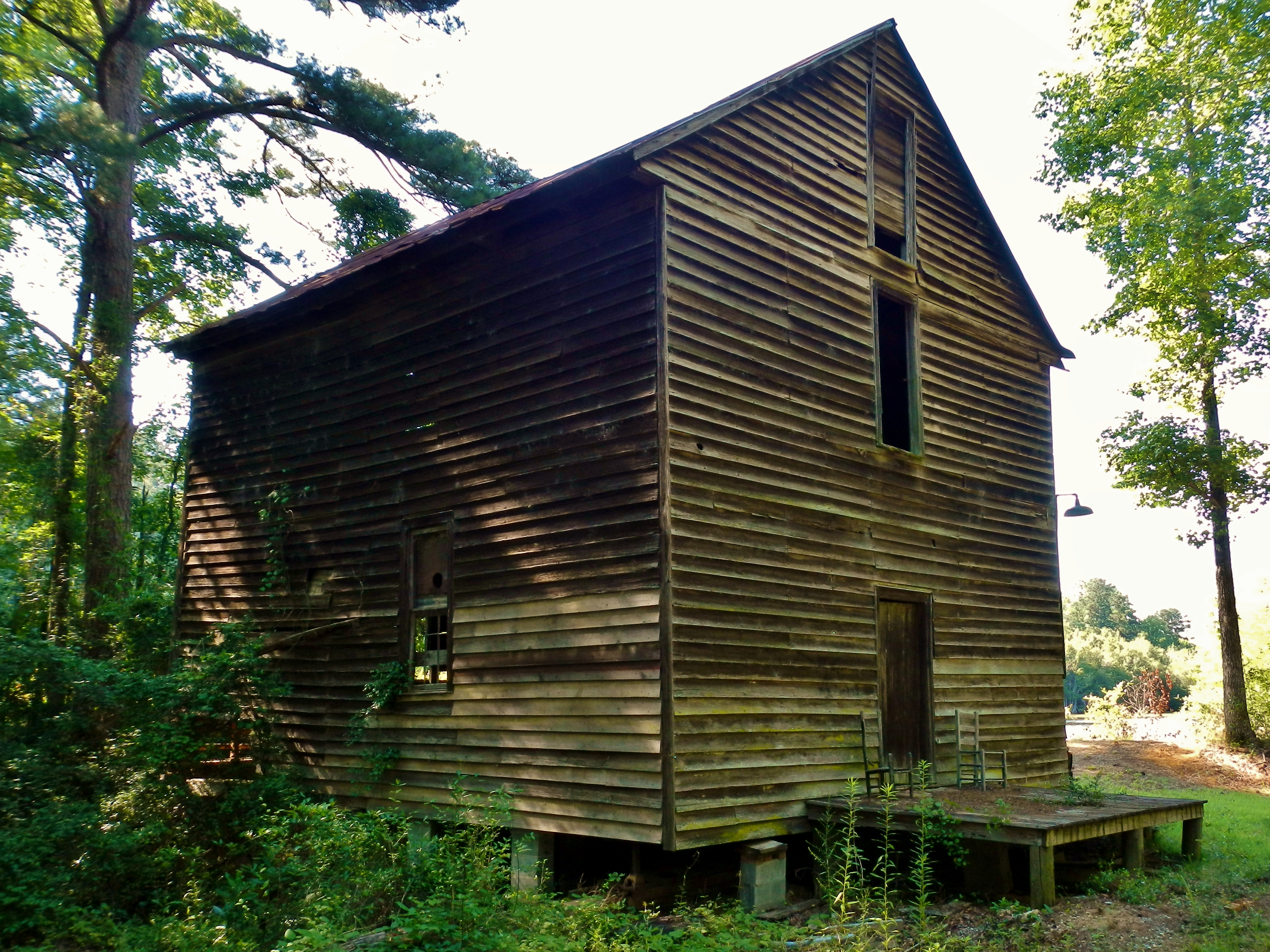

- Location within Georgia
- Location: Weston, Georgia
- Coordinates: 31°58′08″N 84°32′41″W
- Area: 60 acres (24 ha)
- Built: c. 1870
- Built by: John Boyd
- Architectural style: New South Cottage; grist mill
- NRHP reference No.: 09000752
- Added to NRHP: September 24, 2009

Boyd Mill Place, also known as Davenport's Mill and Hearon's Mill, is the site of a historic grist mill constructed circa 1870 in Weston, Georgia in Webster County, Georgia. The mill was built by John Boyd and operated from c.1870 to 1963. Water supply for the mill is behind a 400 feet (120 m) earthen dam.

It was added to the National Register of Historic Places on September 24, 2009. It is located at 580 Mill Pond Road.

The listing includes four contributing buildings and one other contributing structure. It includes the grist mill, a New South Cottage-style house for the miller (c.1910), and associated outbuildings: a pole barn (1993), a shed, a chicken house.

== See also ==
- National Register of Historic Places listings in Webster County, Georgia
