= Webster County Courthouse (Georgia) =

- U.S. National Register of Historic Places
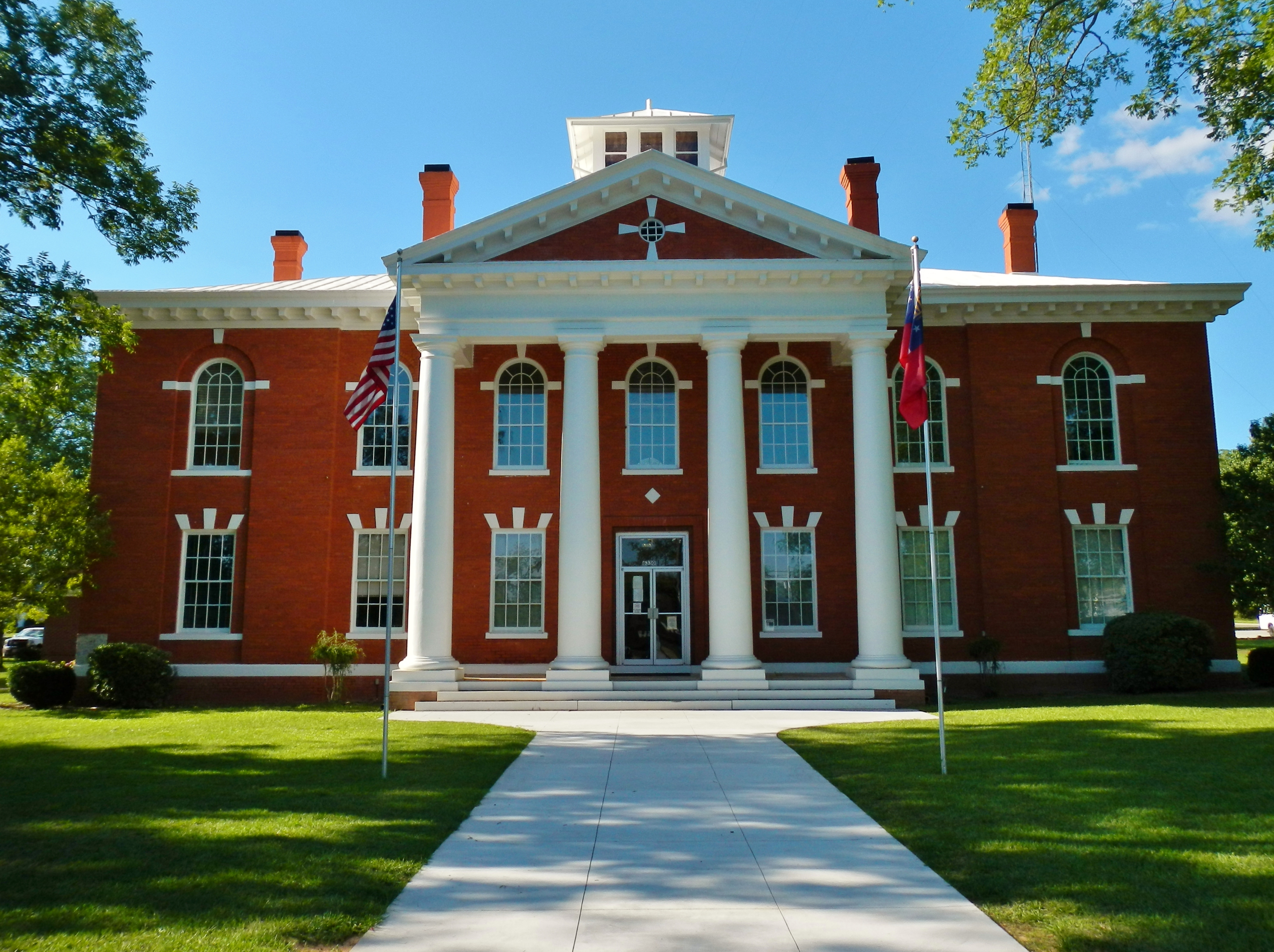

- Location within Georgia Location within the United States
- Location: Preston, Georgia
- Coordinates: 32°03′58″N 84°32′14″W
- Area: 2 acres (0.81 ha)
- Built: 1914
- Built by: Shields, Geise, Rawlings
- Architect: T.F. Lockwood Sr.
- Architectural style: Classical Revival
- MPS: Georgia County Courthouses TR
- NRHP reference No.: 80001262
- Added to NRHP: September 18, 1980

Webster County Courthouse is a historic county courthouse in Preston, Georgia, the county seat for Webster County, Georgia.

It was built in 1915 and was designed in Neoclassical style. It was added to the National Register of Historic Places on September 18, 1980. It is located on Courthouse Square. It was designed by T.F. Lockwood, Sr.

The courthouse is two stories and made of red brick. The white cupola atop the building was added after the attack on Pearl Harbor and local civil defense volunteers stood watch on the cupola every day until the war's end.

== See also ==
- National Register of Historic Places listings in Webster County, Georgia
