= T. Firth Lockwood =

American architect

Thomas Firth Lockwood was the name of two architects in the U.S. state of Georgia, the father and son commonly known as T. Firth Lockwood Sr. (1868–1920) and T. Firth Lockwood Jr. (1894–1963). Thomas Firth Lockwood Sr. came with his brother Frank Lockwood (1865–1935) to Columbus, Georgia, from New Jersey to practice architecture.

A number of their works are listed on the National Register of Historic Places for their architecture.

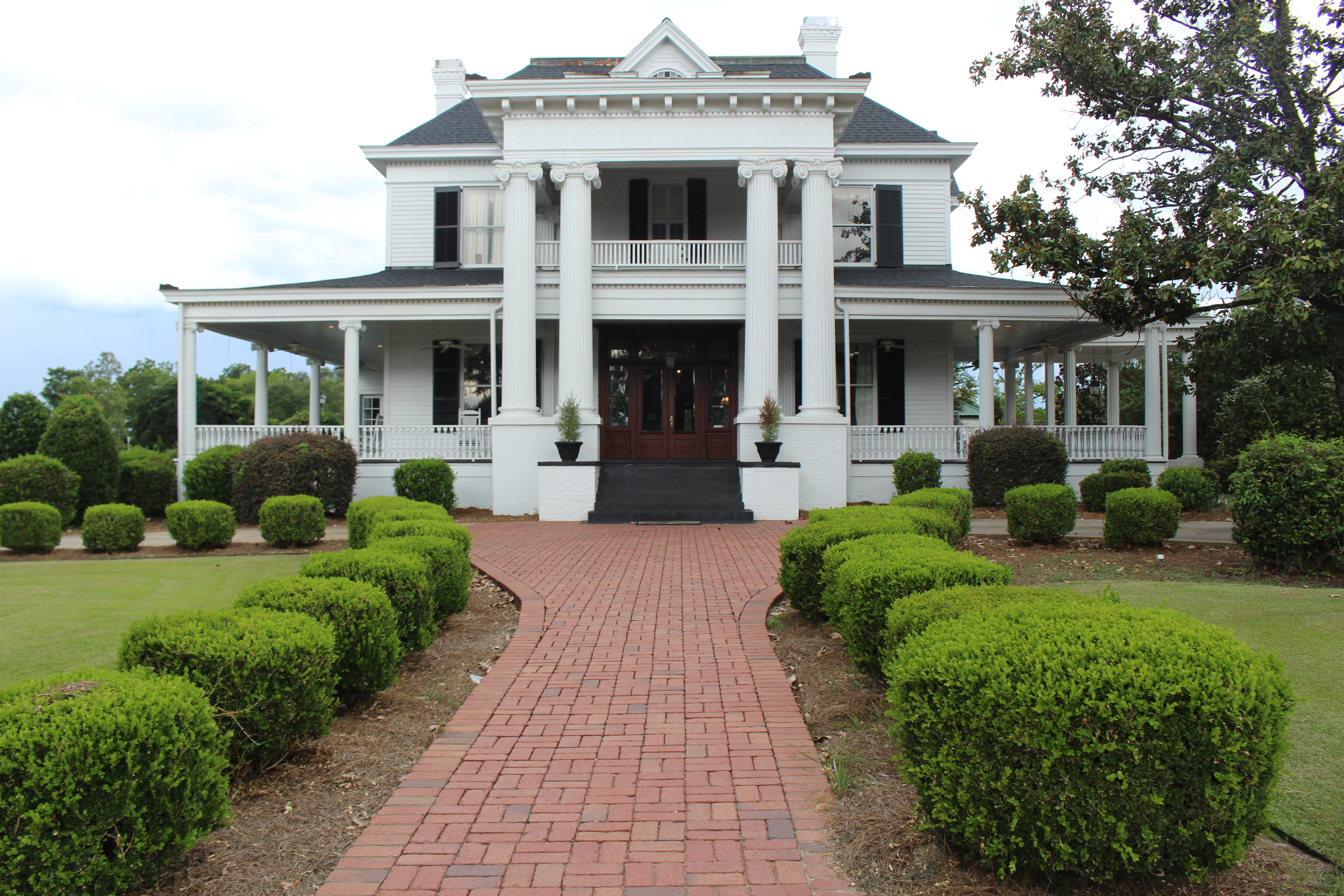
James Price McRee house

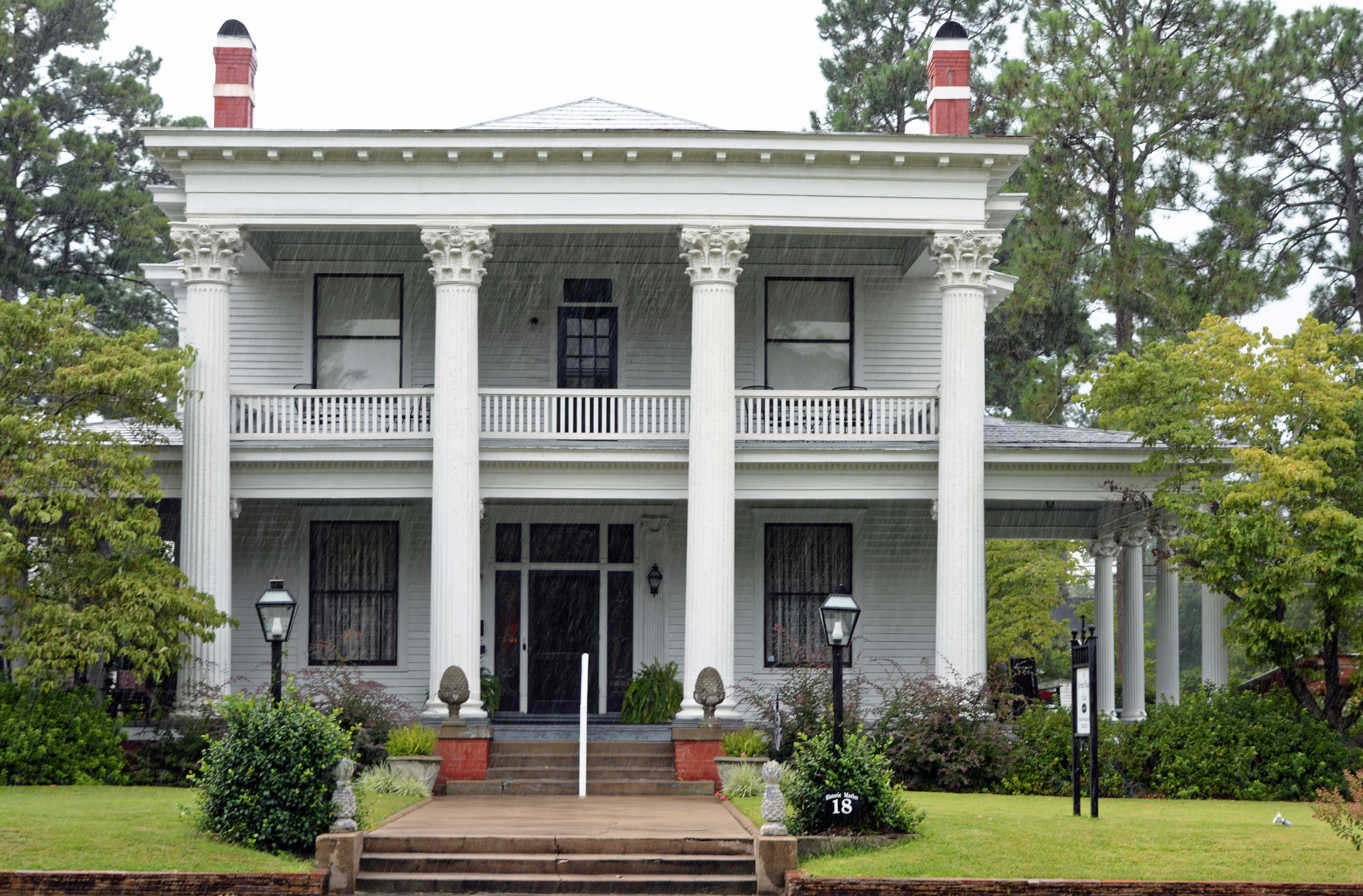
Dorminy-Massee house

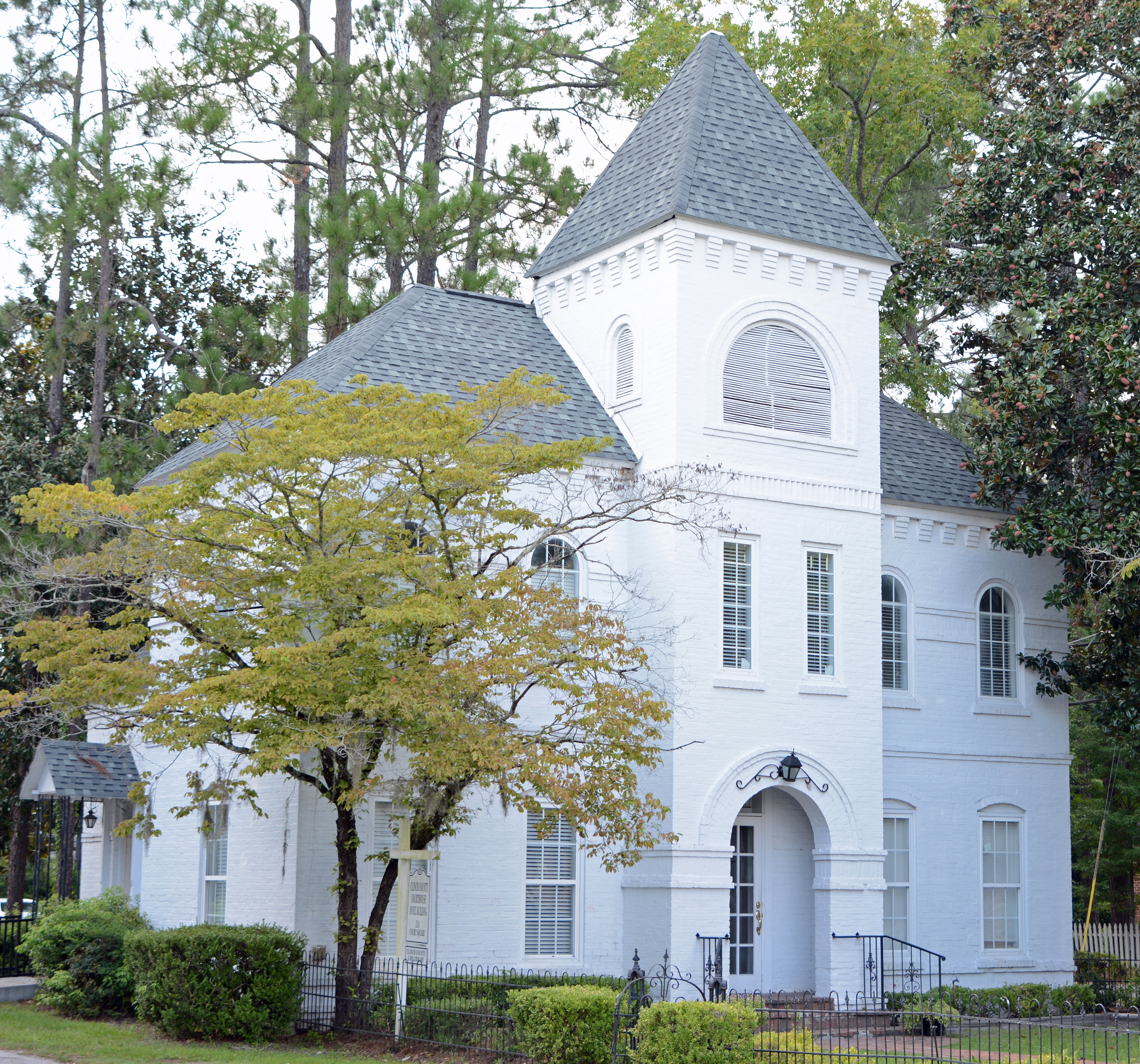
Old Clinch County Jail

Works include (with attribution which is sometimes ambiguous):

- First Presbyterian Church (rebuilding after an 1891 fire) Columbus, Georgia
- Clinch County Jail (1893), Court Sq., Homerville, Georgia (Lockwood, Thomas F.), NRHP-listed
- Columbian Lodge No. 7 Free and Accepted Masons (1941), 1127 2nd Ave., Columbus, Georgia, (T. Firth Lockwood), NRHP-listed
- First Baptist Church (1906), in Tifton Residential Historic District, Tifton, Georgia (Lockwood, T.F.), Romanesque Revival-style church, with an arcaded entrance, round-arched stained-glass windows, and two square corner towers. (The NRHP listing document for the district asserts it was designed by T. Firth Lockwood Jr., but he would have been only about 12 years old, so more likely it was designed by T. Firth Lockwood Sr., age 38 or so then.)
- James Price McRee House (1907), 181 E. Broad St., Camilla, Georgia (Lockwood, T. Firth), NRHP-listed
- Masonic Lodge (Cordele, Georgia) (1907), in Cordele Commercial Historic District, Cordele, Georgia (T. Firth Lockwood Sr.), NRHP-listed
- Arlington Methodist Episcopal Church, South (1908), Pioneer Rd. at Dogwood Dr. Arlington, Georgia (Lockwood, T. Firth Sr.), NRHP-listed
- Carnegie Library of Moultrie (1908), 39 North Main Street, Moultrie, Georgia, with Georgian Revival elements.
- Webster County Courthouse (1915), Courthouse Sq., Preston, GA (Lockwood, T.F), NRHP-listed
- Quitman County Courthouse (1939), Main St., Georgetown, Georgiam in Stripped Classical style. (T. Firth Lockwood Jr.), NRHP-listed
- St. Luke Methodist Church, Columbus, Georgia
- Dorminy-Massee House, 516 W. Central Ave., Fitzgerald, Georgia (Lockwood, T. Firth Sr.), NRHP-listed
- Hiram Warner Hill House, LaGrange St., Greenville, Georgia (Lockwood, Thomas Firth), NRHP-listed
- Methodist Tabernacle, 1605 3rd Ave., Columbus, Georgia (Lockwood, Thomas Firth), NRHP-listed
- Old Dawson Place, 1420 Wynnton Rd., Columbus, Georgia (Lockwood, T. Firth Sr.), NRHP-listed
- Render Family Homestead, GA 18, Greenville, Georgia (Lockwood, T. Firth Sr.), NRHP-listed
- C.B. Tarver Building, 18-23 W. 11th St., Columbus, Georgia (Lockwood, T. Firth), NRHP-listed
- One or more works in Everett Square Historic District, roughly bounded by Knoxville, Vineville, Anderson, and Macon Sts. and the Central of Georgia RR tracks, Fort Valley, Georgia (Lockwood, T. Firth), NRHP-listed
- One or more works in O'Neal School Neighborhood Historic District, Roughly bounded by the Seaboard Coastline Railroad, Owens St. 16th Ave. and 6th St., Cordele, Georgia (Lockwood, T. Firth), NRHP-listed

== See also ==
- Columbus High School, 320 11th St. Columbus, Georgia (Lockwood Bros.), NRHP-listed
- Jasper County Courthouse, Courthouse Sq. Monticello, Georgia (Lockwood Bros.), NRHP-listed
- MacIntyre Park and MacIntyre Park High School, 117 Glenwood Dr. Thomasville, Georgia (Lockwood & Poundstone), NRHP-listed
