= Weston, Georgia =

- Unincorporated community
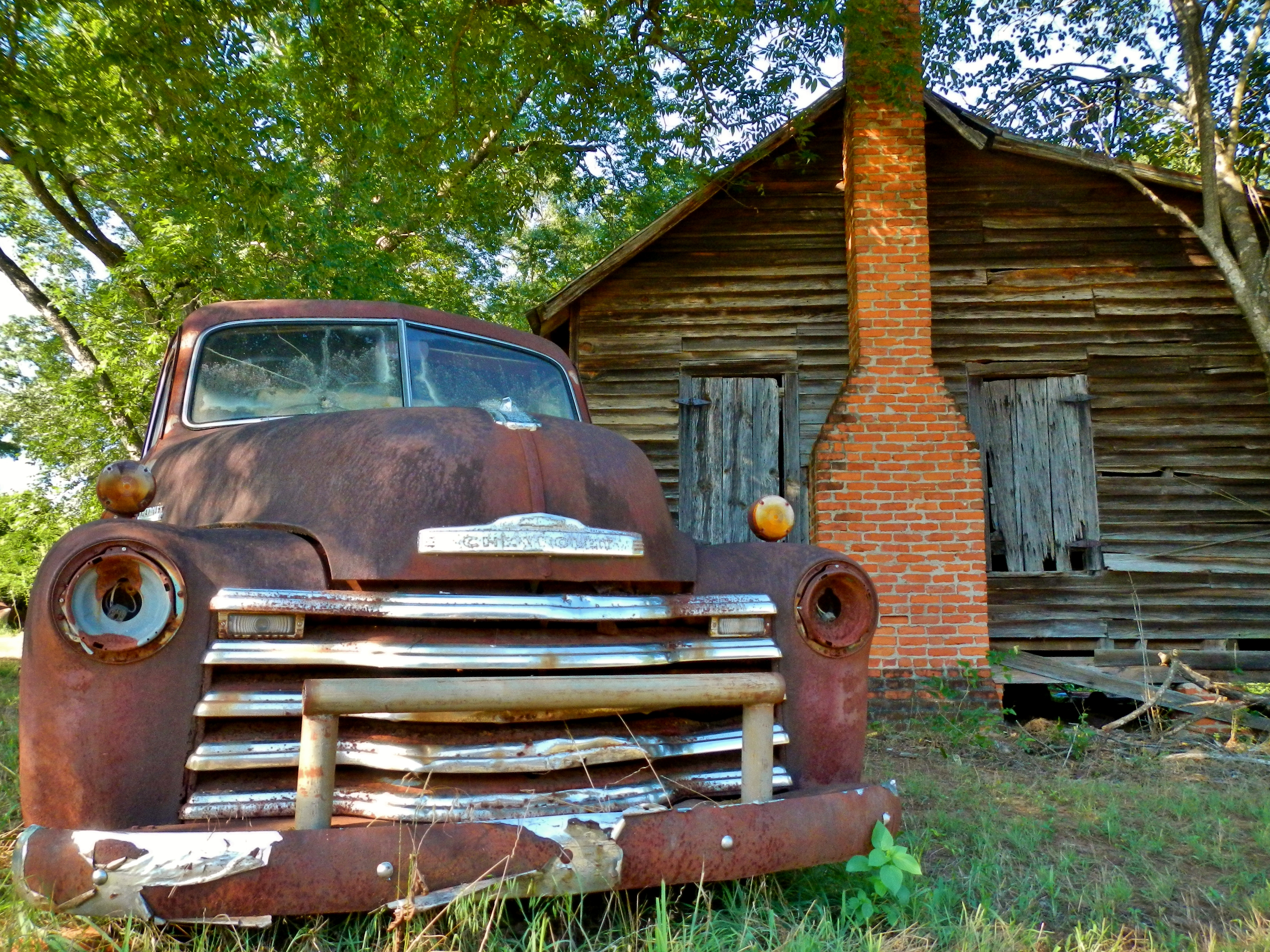
- Weston

- Location in Webster County and the state of Georgia
- Coordinates: 31°58′40″N 84°36′56″W
- Country: United States
- State: Georgia
- County: Webster

Area
  - Total: 0.93 sq mi (2.4 km^{2})
  - Land: 0.93 sq mi (2.4 km^{2})
  - Water: 0 sq mi (0 km^{2})
- Elevation: 509 ft (155 m)

Population (2000)
  - Total: 75
  - Density: 81/sq mi (31.3/km^{2})
- Time zone: UTC-5 (Eastern (EST))
  - Summer (DST): UTC-4 (EDT)
- ZIP code: 31832
- Area code: 229
- FIPS code: 13-82076
- GNIS feature ID: 0333396

Weston is an unincorporated community in Webster County, Georgia, United States. The population was 75 at the 2000 census. In 2009, the former town was disincorporated and consolidated with the Unified Government of Webster County.

== History ==
Some say the town's name honors Joseph L. Weston, an early town elder, while others believe the town site's location in the western portion of the county caused its name to be selected.

The Georgia General Assembly incorporated Weston as a town in 1911. The town's municipal charter was dissolved in 2009.

== Geography ==
Weston is located in west central Georgia along Georgia State Route 520 (South Georgia Parkway), which leads northwest 9 mi (15 km) to Richland and southeast 18 mi (29 km) to Dawson. The community is also roughly the halfway point on the highway between Columbus, 45 mi (72 km) to the northwest, and Albany, 42 mi (68 km) to the southeast. Georgia State Route 41 also runs through the community, leading 8 mi (13 km) north to the Webster County seat of Preston and 18 mi (29 km) south to Shellman.

Weston is located at 31°58′40″N 84°36′56″W (31.977666, -84.615451).

According to the United States Census Bureau, the town has a total area of 0.9 square miles (2.3 km^{2}), all land.

== Demographics ==
Historical population
Census	Pop.	Note	%±
1870	66		—
1880	176		166.7%
1890	215		22.2%
1900	273		27.0%
1910	319		16.8%
1920	208		−34.8%
1930	235		13.0%
1940	173		−26.4%
1950	162		−6.4%
1960	120		−25.9%
1970	73		−39.2%
1980	109		49.3%
1990	42		−61.5%
2000	75		78.6%
U.S. Decennial Census

As of the census of 2000, there were 75 people, 29 households, and 20 families residing in the town. The population density was 79.5 inhabitants per square mile (30.7/km^{2}). There were 42 housing units at an average density of 44.5 per square mile (17.2/km^{2}). The racial makeup of the town was 81.33% White and 18.67% African American.

There were 29 households, out of which 37.9% had children under the age of 18 living with them, 65.5% were married couples living together, 6.9% had a female householder with no husband present, and 27.6% were non-families. 27.6% of all households were made up of individuals, and 17.2% had someone living alone who was 65 years of age or older. The average household size was 2.59 and the average family size was 3.19.

In the town the population was spread out, with 21.3% under the age of 18, 6.7% from 18 to 24, 21.3% from 25 to 44, 30.7% from 45 to 64, and 20.0% who were 65 years of age or older. The median age was 47 years. For every 100 females, there were 102.7 males. For every 100 females age 18 and over, there were 84.4 males.

The median income for a household in the town was $41,000, and the median income for a family was $41,875. Males had a median income of $28,125 versus $18,750 for females. The per capita income for the town was $22,275. There were no families and 3.0% of the population living below the poverty line, including no under eighteens and 66.7% of those over 64.

== Education ==
Webster County School District operates public schools serving the community.

== Gallery ==
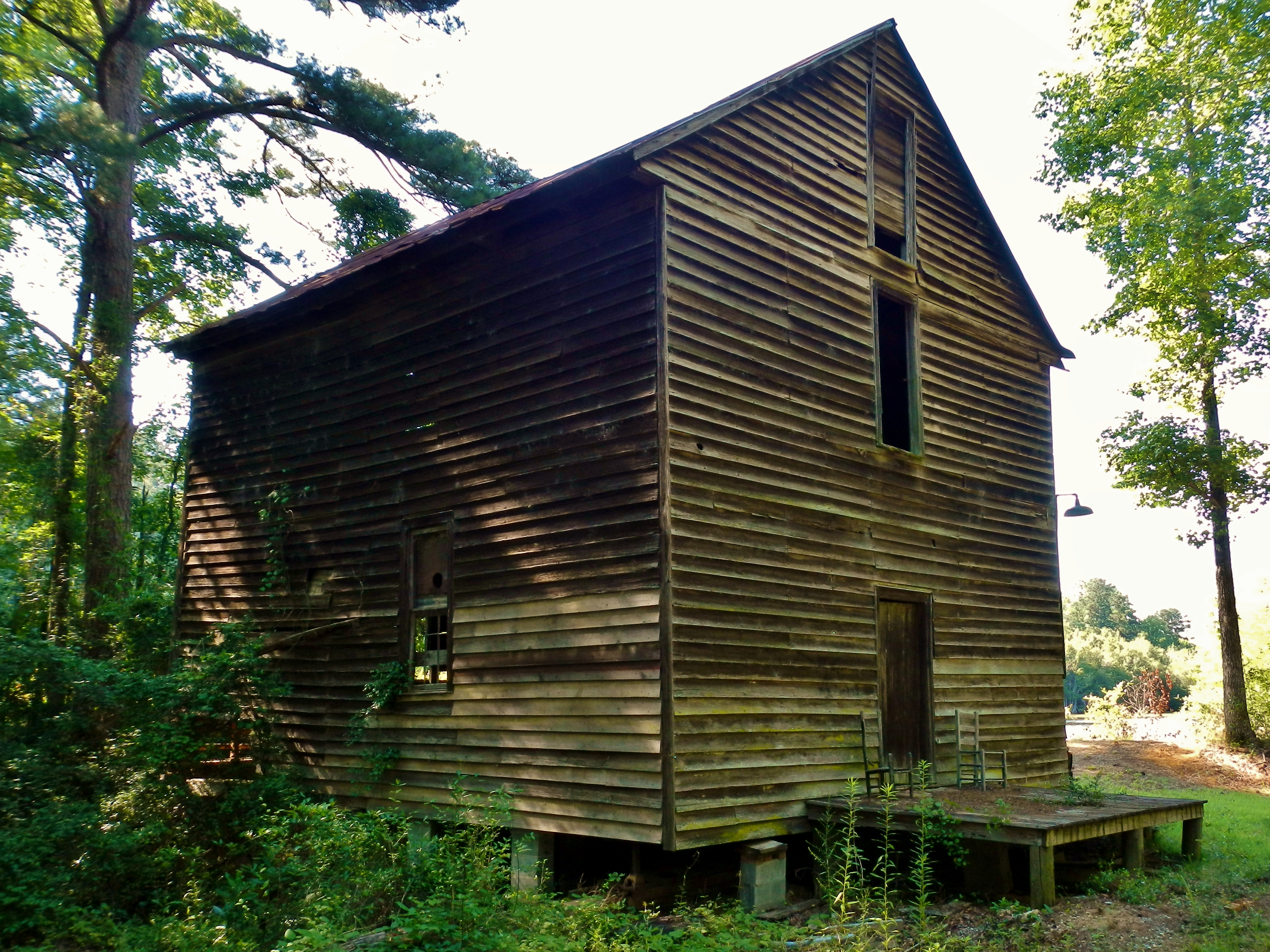
Boyd Mill Place was added to the National Register of Historic Places.

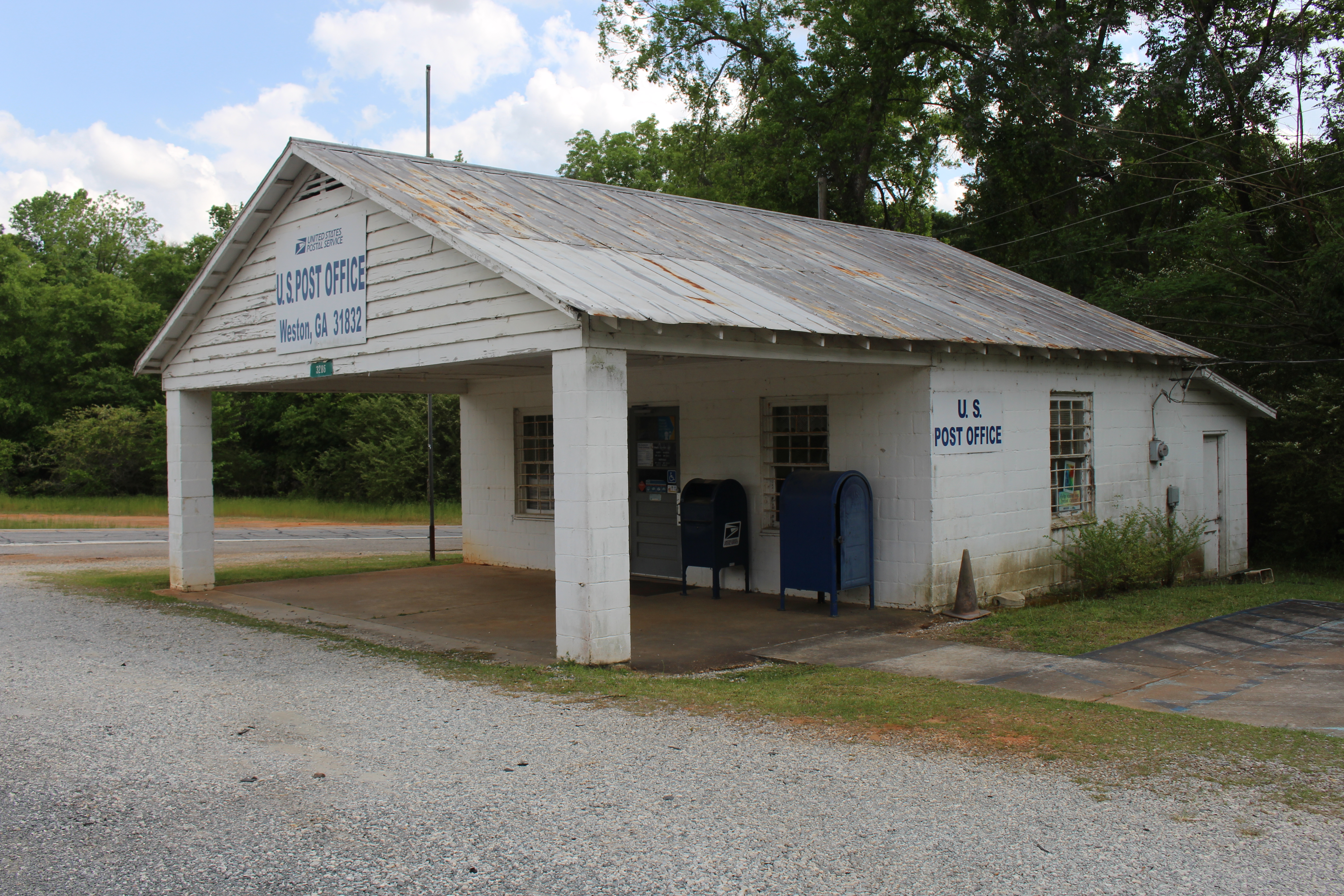
Weston Post Office (ZIP code: 31832)

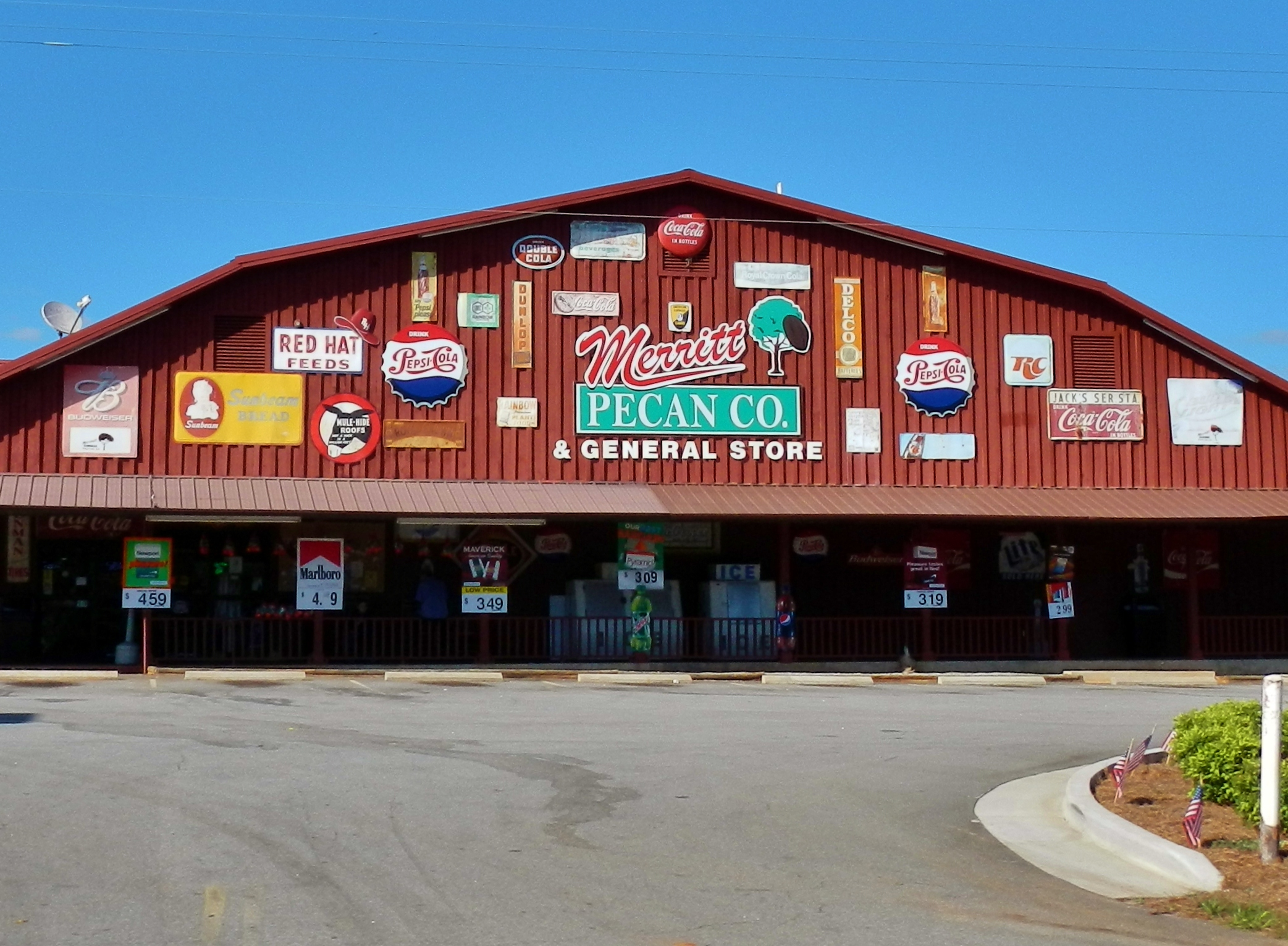
Merritt Pecan Company and General Store
