= James Price McRee House =

Historic house in Georgia, United States

- U.S. National Register of Historic Places
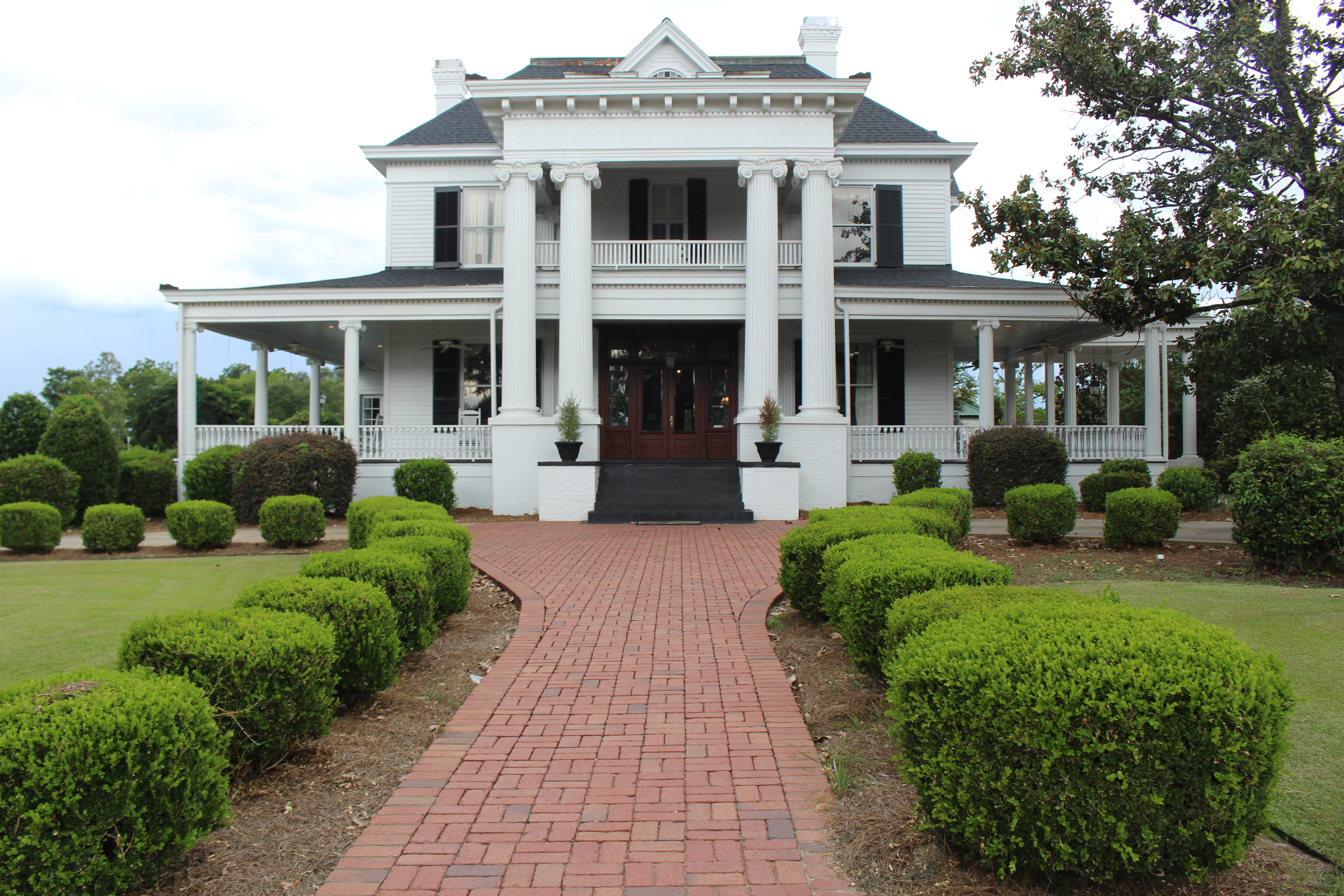
- James Price McRee House, 2017

- Location within Georgia Location within the United States
- Location: 181 E. Broad St., Camilla, Georgia
- Coordinates: 31°13′50″N 84°12′7″W
- Area: 5 acres (2.0 ha)
- Built: 1907
- Built by: Greer, Lloyd
- Architect: Lockwood, T. Firth
- Architectural style: Classical Revival
- NRHP reference No.: 79000734
- Added to NRHP: December 11, 1979

The James Price McRee House in Camilla, Georgia, also known as McRee Hall, is a Classical Revival-style house built in 1907. It was designed by architect T. Firth Lockwood and it has a two-story portico at its front entrance. It is regarded as one of the finest of several Classical Revival residences in Camilla. It was listed on the National Register of Historic Places in 1979.

It was built for James Price McRee as a wedding present for his bride, Jeanette Wade, who was daughter of the Brooks County sheriff.

The listing is for a 5 acres (2.0 ha) property with three contributing buildings.
