= Gillespie-Selden Historic District =

Historic area of Cordele, Georgia, US

- U.S. National Register of Historic Places
- Location within Georgia
- Location: Roughly bounded by the railroad, 10th St., 15th St., and 16th Ave., Cordele, Georgia
- Coordinates: 31.96523°N 83.79083°W
- Area: 50 acres (20 ha) or 42 acres (17 ha)
- Built: 1890
- Architectural style: Queen Anne, Bungalow/craftsman
- NRHP reference No.: 97000336
- Added to NRHP: December 2, 1998

The Gillespie-Selden Historic District is a historic district in Cordele, Georgia which was listed on the National Register of Historic Places in 1998. It includes an "African-American residential neighborhood, the Gillespie-Selden Institute, a few commercial buildings, and several African-American churches." The neighborhood was established by African-American railway workers in the late 1890s.

The district is 42 acres (17 ha) in size and includes 87 contributing buildings, two contributing structures, and a contributing site. The area is southwest of the downtown of Cordele, and is roughly bounded on the north by the CSX Railroad tracks and 13th Avenue, on the east by 11th St., on the south by 16th Ave. (U.S. Route 280), and on the west by 15th St.

In 2022, work began on a housing development in the historic district with the hope of revitalizing the neighborhood. The development, named "Gillespie Gardens", is aimed at tenants living at less than 60% of the region's median income.

The former school and hospital building now houses a community center.

== See also ==
- National Register of Historic Places listings in Crisp County, Georgia
- List of African-American historic places in Georgia
