= Cordele Commercial Historic District =

Historic district in Georgia, United States

- U.S. National Register of Historic Places
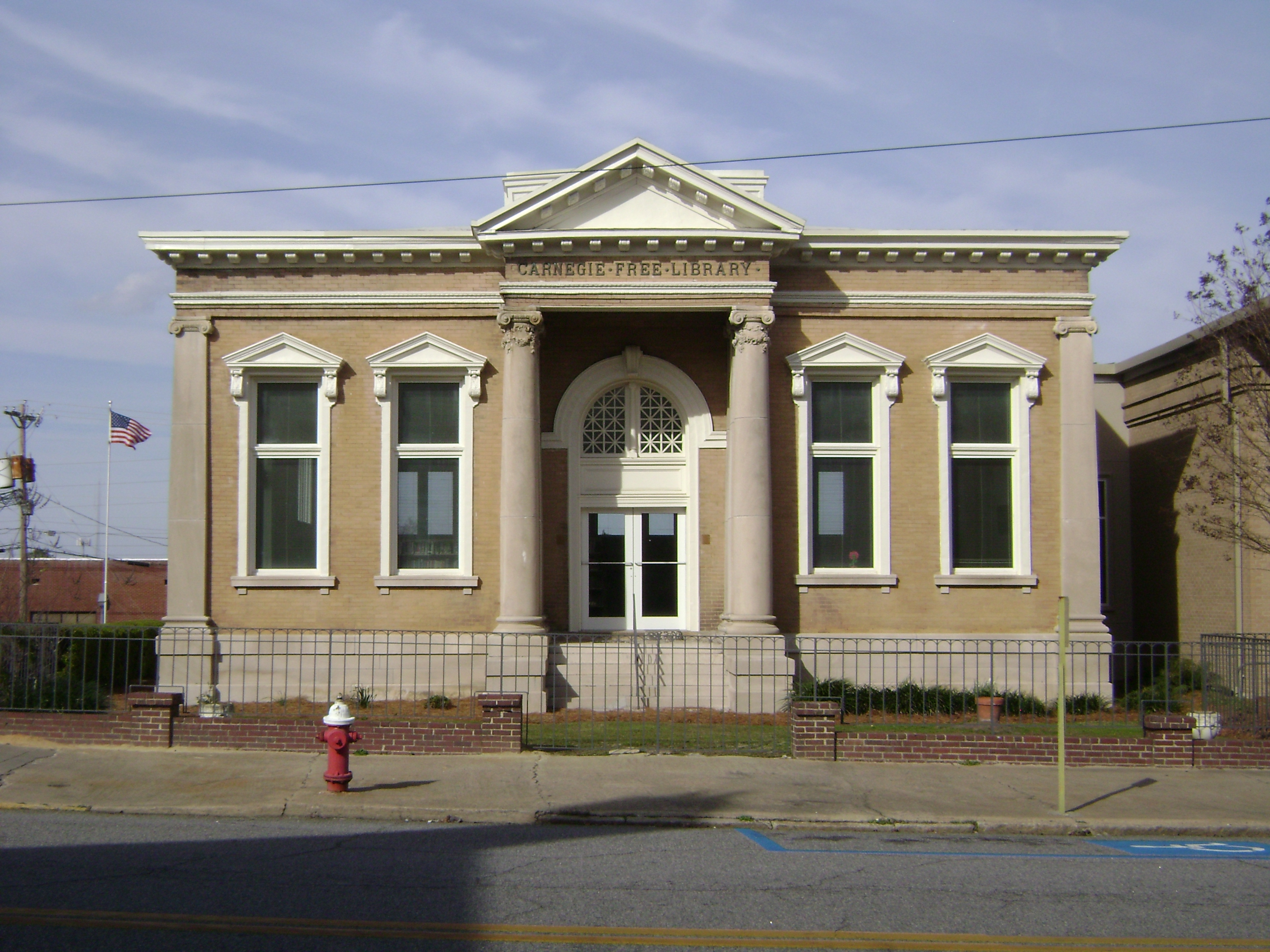
- Carnegie Library

- Location within Georgia
- Location: Roughly bounded by Sixth Ave., Sixth St., Ninth Ave., and Fourteenth St., Cordele, Georgia
- Coordinates: 31°58′12″N 83°46′57″W
- Area: 55 acres (22 ha)
- Built: 1888
- Architect: J.W. Golucke & Co.; T. Firth Lockwood, Sr.
- Architectural style: Late 19th and 20th Century Revivals, Italianate, Commercial Style
- NRHP reference No.: 89000803
- Added to NRHP: July 6, 1989

The Cordele Commercial Historic District is a 55 acres (22 ha) historic district in Cordele, Georgia, US which was listed on the National Register of Historic Places in 1989. The listing included 66 contributing buildings and a contributing structure.

The district is roughly bounded by Sixth Ave., Sixth St., Ninth Ave., and Fourteenth St.

It includes the Cordele Carnegie Library, a Carnegie library designed by J.W. Golucke & Co. which was built in 1903.

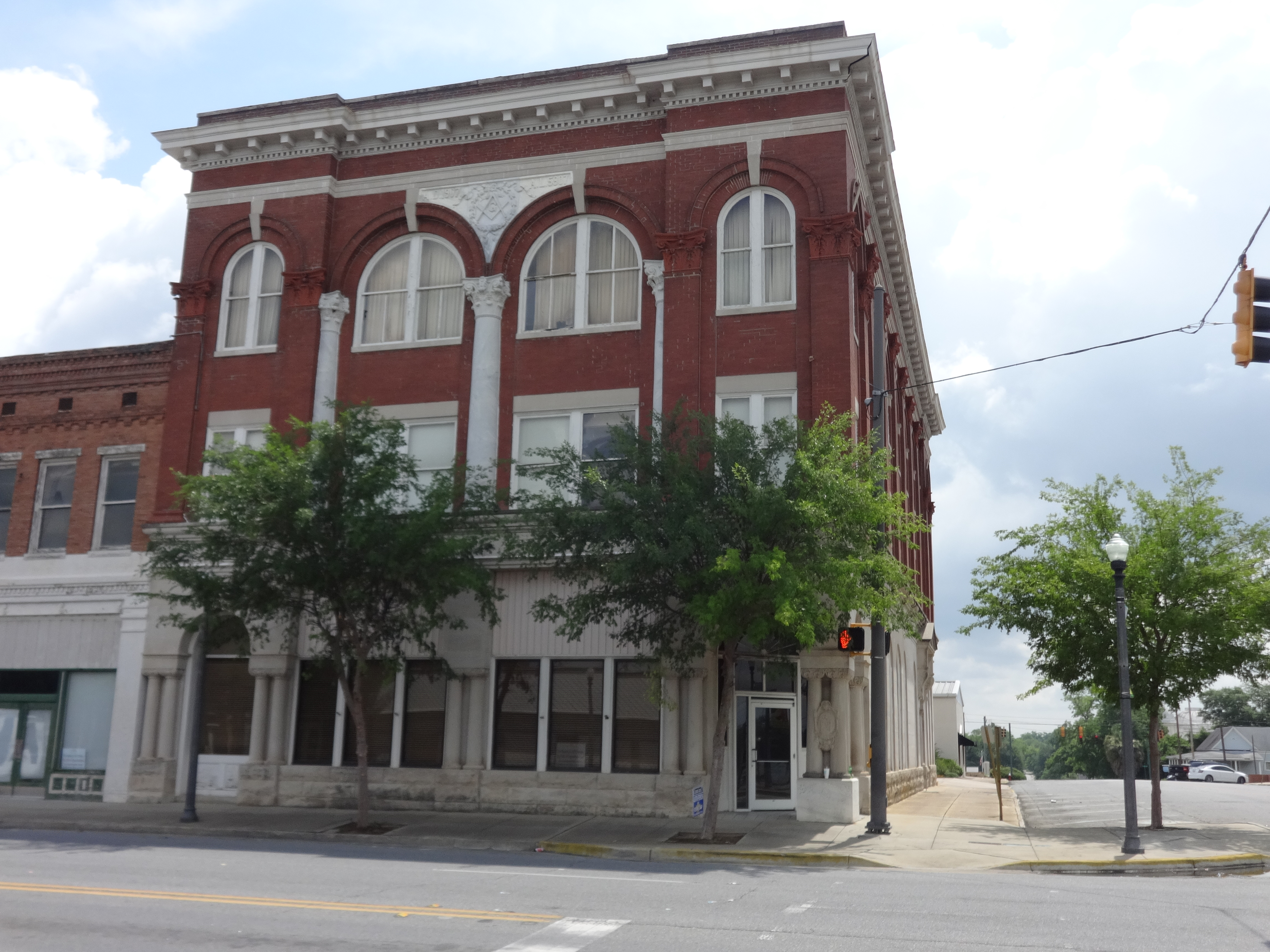
Masonic building

The 1907 Masonic Lodge was designed in Beaux Arts style by architect T. Firth Lockwood, Sr.

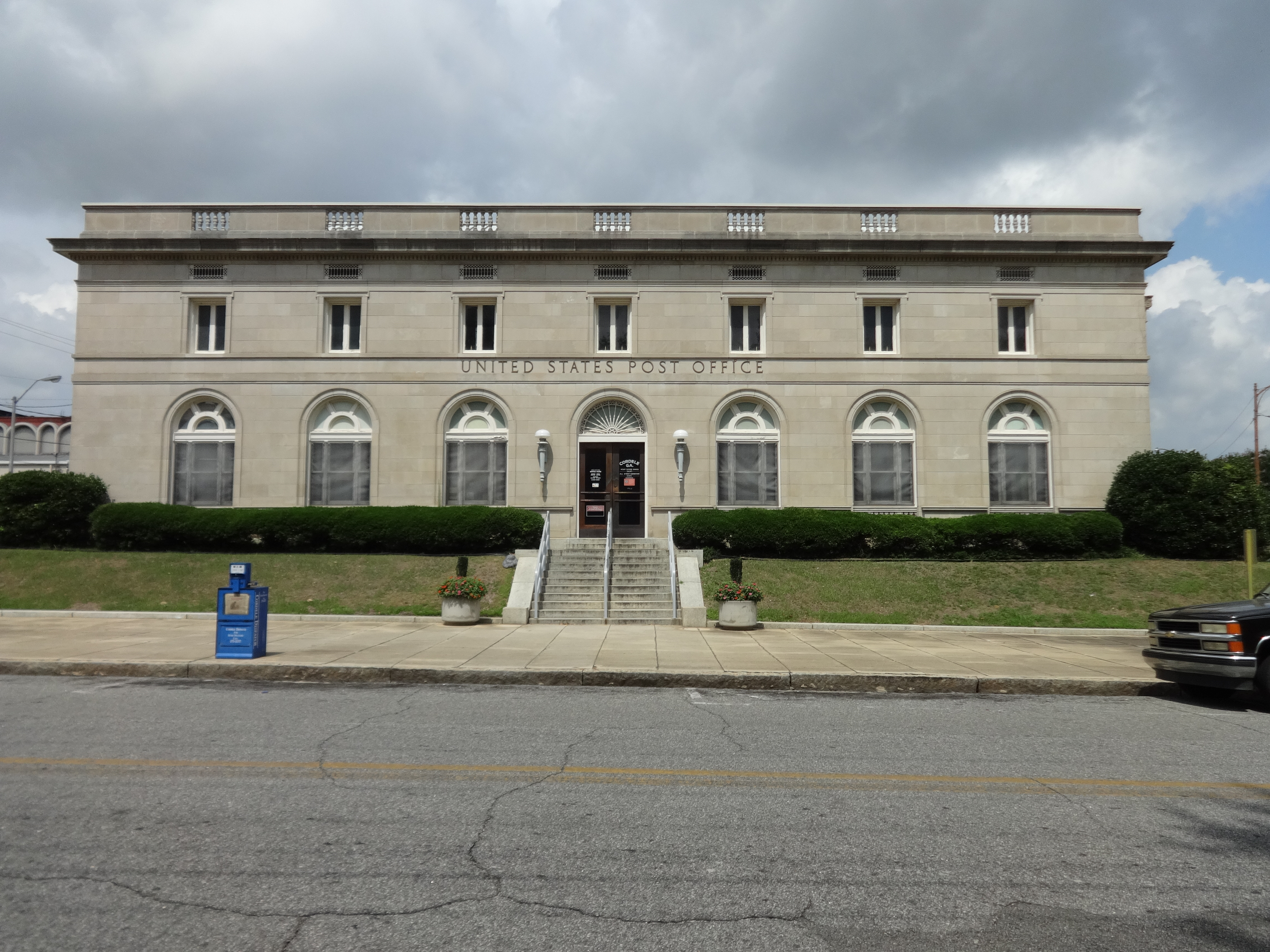
Post office

It includes a U.S. Post Office building (1912–13) credited to James Knox Taylor, Supervising Architect of the U. S. Treasury, which is separately listed on the National Register as United States Post Office (Cordele, Georgia).
