= Arlington United Methodist Church =

Historic church in Georgia, United States

- Arlington Methodist Episcopal Church, South
- U.S. National Register of Historic Places
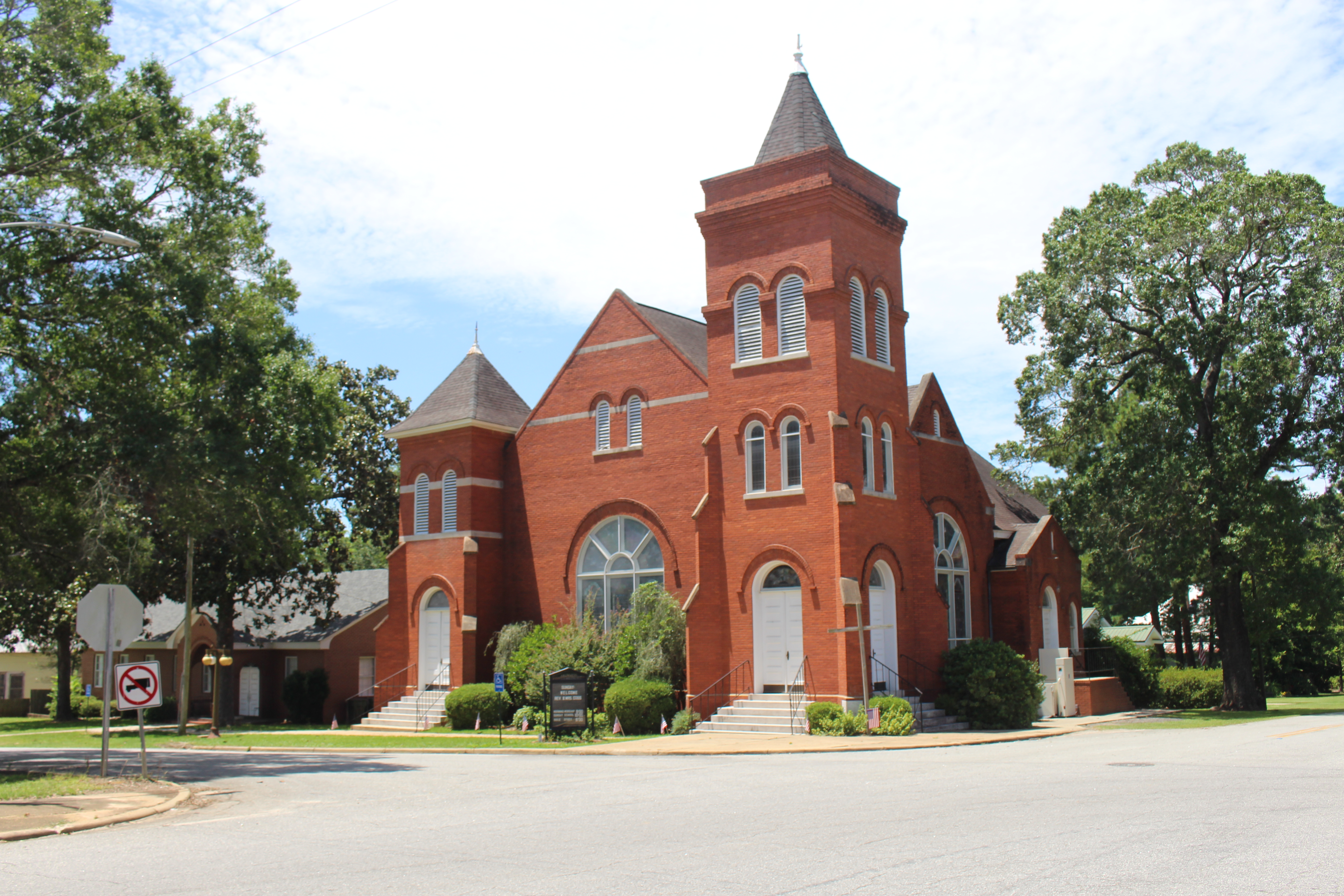
- Arlington United Methodist Church, Arlington, Calhoun County, Georgia

- Location within Georgia Location within the United States
- Location: Pioneer Rd. at Dogwood Dr., Arlington, Georgia
- Coordinates: 31°26′21″N 84°43′38″W
- Area: less than one acre
- Built: 1908
- Architect: T. Firth Lockwood, Sr.
- Architectural style: Romanesque Revival
- NRHP reference No.: 90000572
- Added to NRHP: April 5, 1990

The Arlington United Methodist Church is the only Methodist church in Arlington, Georgia. The church congregation was founded in 1873 and met in a small schoolhouse, then built a white wooden church in 1876. The present church was built in 1908 and was known as Arlington Methodist Episcopal Church, South. It is Romanesque Revival in style and was designed by architect T. Firth Lockwood, Sr. It is built of red brick and has two towers of different heights.

The church changed its name in 1939 by dropping the word "Episcopal" and in 1969 by adding the word "United".

It was listed on the National Register of Historic Places in 1990 as "Arlington Methodist Episcopal Church, South". The original parsonage building (c. 1957), which in 1990 was an educational building, and a fellowship hall (c. 1965), were not included in the listing.

It was designed by architect T. Firth Lockwood, Sr.
