= United States Post Office (Cordele, Georgia) =

- US Post Office--Cordele
- U.S. National Register of Historic Places
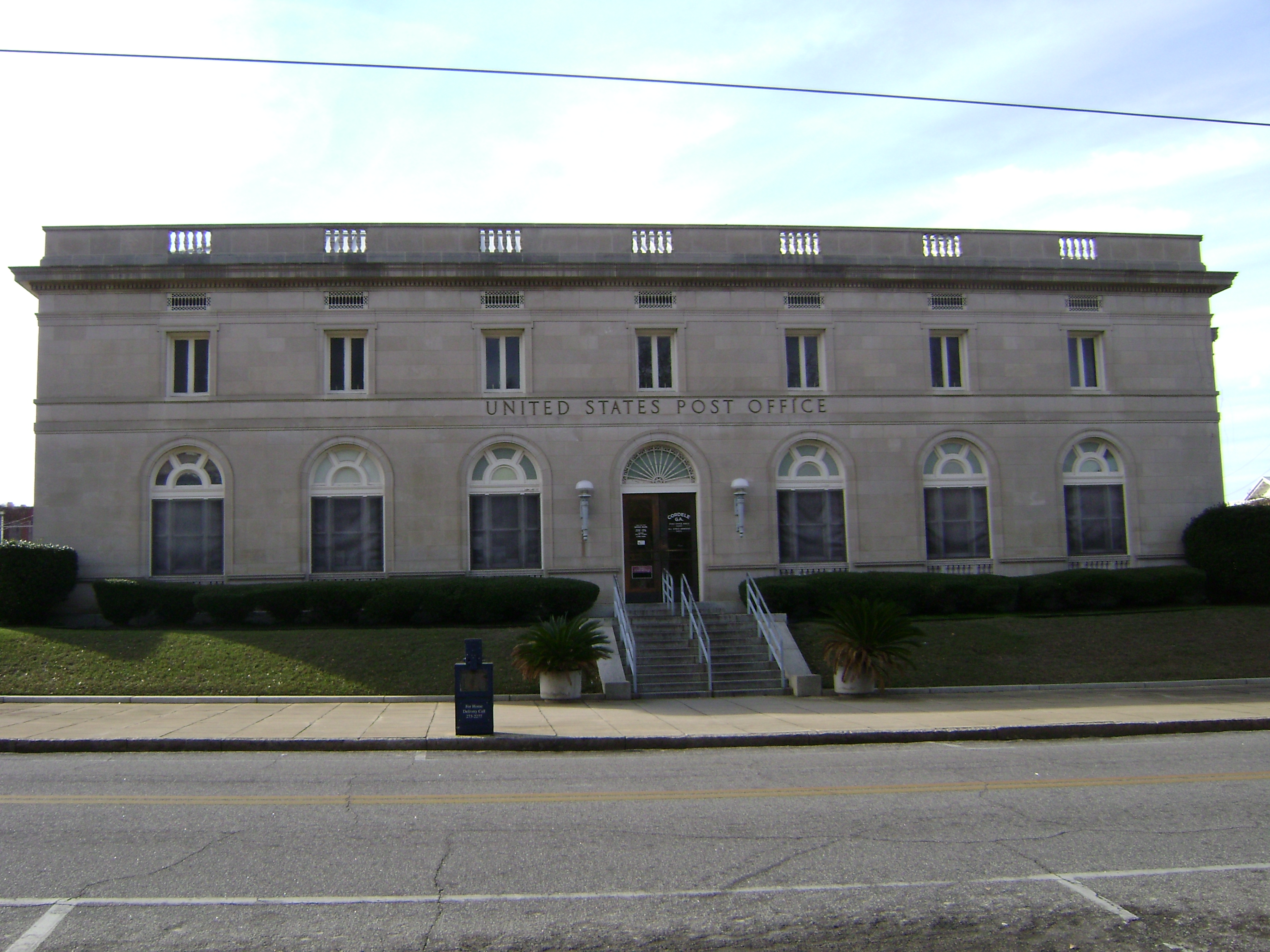

- Location within Georgia
- Location: 102-104 6th St., Cordele, Georgia
- Coordinates: 31°58′7″N 83°46′54″W
- Area: 0.4 acres (0.16 ha)
- Built: 1912-13
- Architect: James Knox Taylor
- Architectural style: Renaissance
- NRHP reference No.: 84000977
- Added to NRHP: June 29, 1984

The U.S. Post Office in Cordele, Georgia is a historic building built during 1912–13. It was added to the National Register of Historic Places on June 29, 1984. It is located at 102-104 6th Street. James Knox Taylor is credited as the building's architect and its architectural design is considered Renaissance Revival architecture.

Its NRHP nomination deemed it to be "a fine example of Taylor's efforts to provide the smaller communities with buildings that embodied the style of the Renaissance Revival" and compared it to The Louvre, Saint Paul's Cathedral, the banqueting house of Whitehall, and the Petit Trianon of Versailles.

== See also ==
- National Register of Historic Places listings in Crisp County, Georgia
