= Webster County School District (Georgia) =

School district in Georgia (U.S. state)

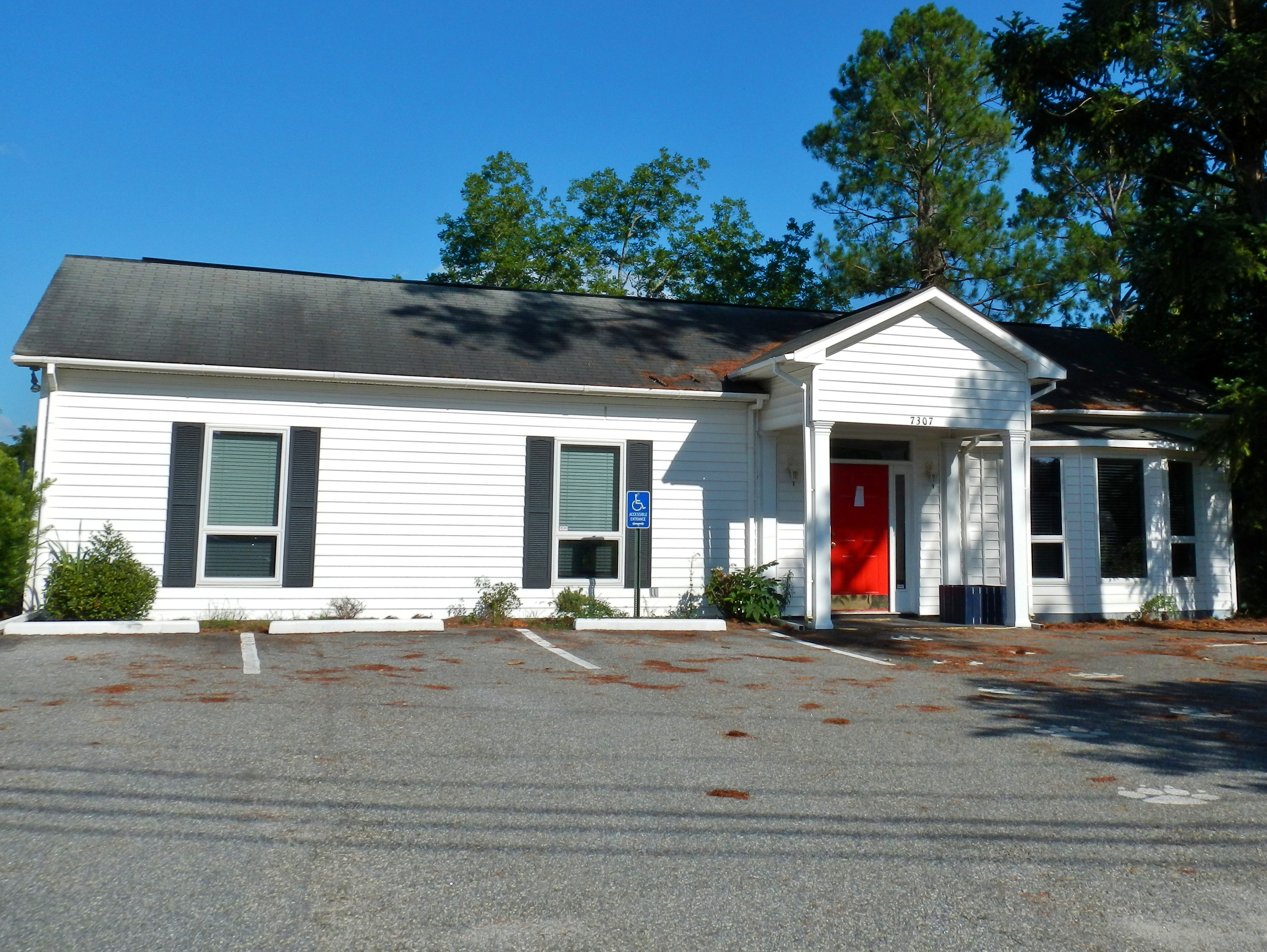

Address
- 7307 Washington Streer Preston, Georgia, 31824-3935; United States
- Coordinates: 32.070975°N 84.540868°W

District information
- Grades: Pre-school - 12
- Superintendent: Marc Maynor
- Accreditations: Southern Association of Colleges and Schools; Georgia Accrediting Commission

Students and staff
- Enrollment: 405
- Faculty: 23

Other information
- Telephone: (229) 828-3365
- Website: www.websterbobcats.org

The Webster County School District is a public school district in Webster County, Georgia, United States, based in Preston. It serves the communities of Preston and Weston.

== Schools ==
The Webster County School District has one elementary-middle school and one high school.

=== Elementary-Middle school ===
- Webster County Elementary/Middle School

=== High school ===
- Webster County High School
