= Webster County, Georgia =

County in Georgia, United States

- County
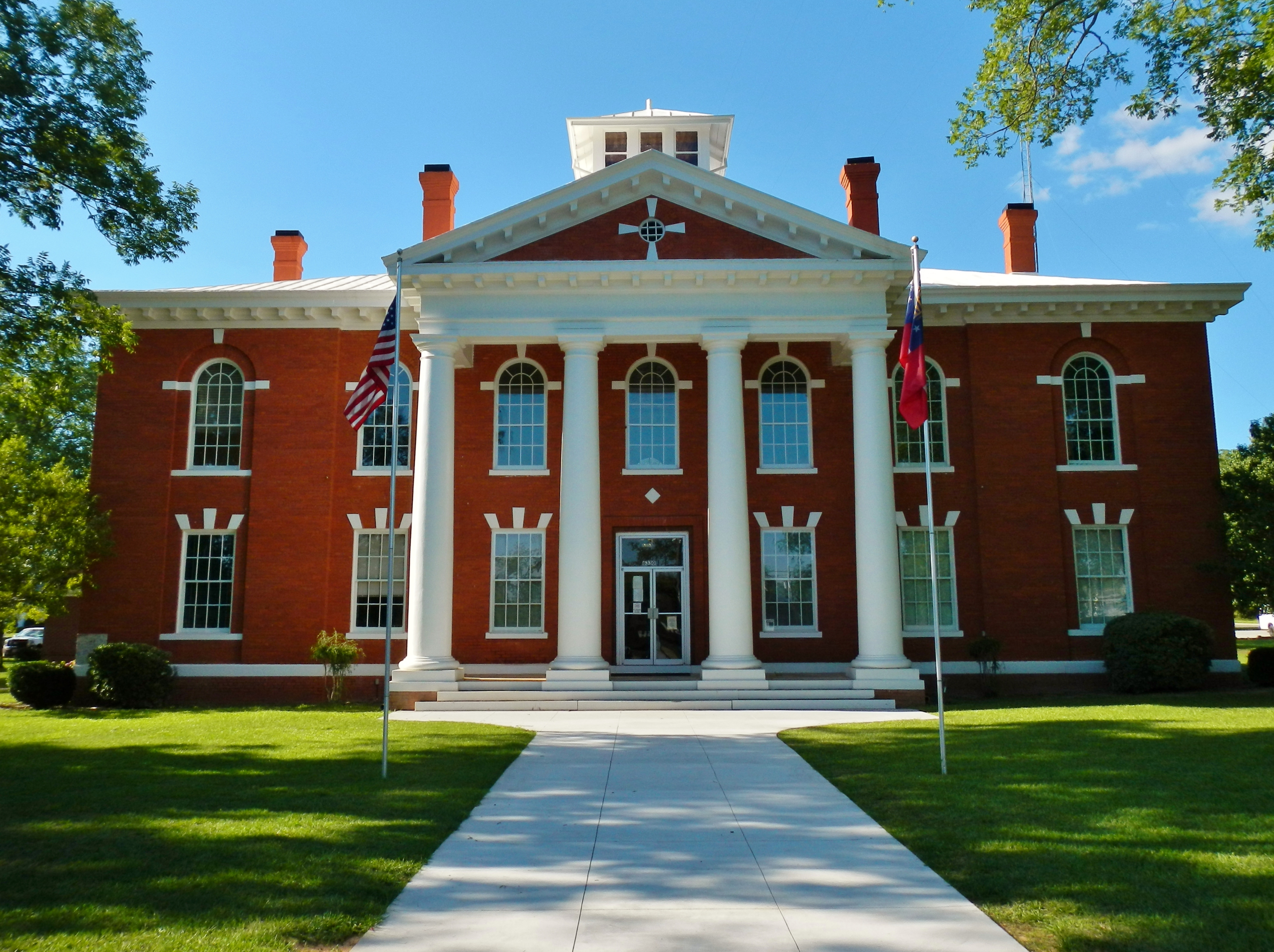
- County courthouse in Preston

- Seal

- Location within the U.S. state of Georgia
- Coordinates: 32°03′N 84°33′W
- Country: United States
- State: Georgia
- Founded: December 16, 1853; 172 years ago
- Named for: Daniel Webster
- Seat: Preston
- Largest community: Preston

Area
  - Total: 210 sq mi (540 km^{2})
  - Land: 209 sq mi (540 km^{2})
  - Water: 1.1 sq mi (2.8 km^{2}) 0.5%

Population (2020)
  - Total: 2,348
  - Estimate (2025): 2,369 ▲
  - Density: 11.2/sq mi (4.34/km^{2})
- Time zone: UTC−5 (Eastern)
  - Summer (DST): UTC−4 (EDT)
- Congressional district: 2nd
- Website: www.webstercountyga.org

Webster County is a county located in the west central portion of the U.S. state of Georgia. As of the 2020 census reflected a population of 2,348, making it the third-least populous county in Georgia. The county seat is Preston.

== History ==
Webster County was created by an act of the Georgia General Assembly on December 16, 1853, as Kinchafoonee County. A subsequent legislative act on February 21, 1856, changed the name to Webster. The land for the county came from eastern portions of Stewart County.

The county is named for Daniel Webster, U.S. representative of New Hampshire and U.S. representative and U.S. senator of Massachusetts. Webster County's original name of Kinchafoonee came from the Kinchafoonee Creek which runs through the county.

On January 1, 2009, the city of Preston and town of Weston gave up their municipal charters and formed a consolidated city-county known as the Unified Government of Webster County.

== Geography ==
According to the U.S. Census Bureau, the county has a total area of 210 square miles (540 km^{2}), of which 209 square miles (540 km^{2}) is land and 1.1 square miles (2.8 km^{2}) (0.5%) is water.

The majority of Webster County, bordered to the southwest by State Route 520, is located in the Kinchafoonee-Muckalee sub-basin of the ACF River Basin (Apalachicola-Chattahoochee-Flint River Basin). The southwestern corner of the county is located in the Ichawaynochaway Creek sub-basin of the same ACF River Basin. A tiny edge of the southwestern border, just south of State Route 520, is located in the Middle Chattahoochee River-Walter F. George Lake sub-basin of the same ACF River Basin.

=== Major highways ===
- U.S. Route 280 / State Route 27
- State Route 41
- State Route 45
- State Route 153
- State Route 520

=== Adjacent counties ===
- Marion County – north
- Sumter County – east
- Terrell County – south
- Randolph County – southwest
- Stewart County – west

== Communities ==
None of these places are incorporated, instead Webster county acts as a unified county. Preston is the county seat, despite being unincorporated.

- Archery
- Preston (county seat)
- Weston

== Demographics ==
Historical population
Census	Pop.	Note	%±
1860	5,030		—
1870	4,677		−7.0%
1880	5,237		12.0%
1890	5,695		8.7%
1900	6,618		16.2%
1910	6,151		−7.1%
1920	5,342		−13.2%
1930	5,032		−5.8%
1940	4,726		−6.1%
1950	4,081		−13.6%
1960	3,247		−20.4%
1970	2,362		−27.3%
1980	2,341		−0.9%
1990	2,263		−3.3%
2000	2,390		5.6%
2010	2,799		17.1%
2020	2,348		−16.1%
2025 (est.)	2,369	▲	0.9%
U.S. Decennial Census; 1790-1880 1890-1910; 1920-1930 1930-1940; 1940-1950 1960-1980; 1980-2000 2010

=== Racial and ethnic composition ===
Webster County, Georgia – Racial and ethnic composition Note: the US Census treats Hispanic/Latino as an ethnic category. This table excludes Latinos from the racial categories and assigns them to a separate category. Hispanics/Latinos may be of any race.
Race / Ethnicity (NH = Non-Hispanic)	Pop 1980	Pop 1990	Pop 2000	Pop 2010	Pop 2020	% 1980	% 1990	% 2000	% 2010	% 2020
White alone (NH)	1,145	1,126	1,186	1,492	1,136	48.91%	49.76%	49.62%	53.30%	48.38%
Black or African American alone (NH)	1,159	1,132	1,123	1,177	1,063	49.51%	50.02%	46.99%	42.05%	45.27%
Native American or Alaska Native alone (NH)	9	4	2	0	0	0.38%	0.18%	0.08%	0.00%	0.00%
Asian alone (NH)	2	0	0	7	12	0.09%	0.00%	0.00%	0.25%	0.51%
Native Hawaiian or Pacific Islander alone (NH)	x	x	0	0	6	x	x	0.00%	0.00%	0.26%
Other race alone (NH)	1	0	0	1	3	0.04%	0.00%	0.00%	0.04%	0.13%
Mixed race or Multiracial (NH)	x	x	13	24	69	x	x	0.54%	0.86%	2.94%
Hispanic or Latino (any race)	25	1	66	98	59	1.07%	0.04%	2.76%	3.50%	2.51%
Total	2,341	2,263	2,390	2,799	2,348	100.00%	100.00%	100.00%	100.00%	100.00%

=== 2020 census ===
As of the 2020 census, the county had a population of 2,348 and 724 families residing in the county. The median age was 45.5 years. 21.3% of residents were under the age of 18 and 22.0% of residents were 65 years of age or older. For every 100 females there were 90.7 males, and for every 100 females age 18 and over there were 90.0 males age 18 and over. 0.0% of residents lived in urban areas, while 100.0% lived in rural areas.

The racial makeup of the county was 48.8% White, 45.3% Black or African American, 0.1% American Indian and Alaska Native, 0.5% Asian, 0.3% Native Hawaiian and Pacific Islander, 0.9% from some other race, and 4.2% from two or more races. Hispanic or Latino residents of any race comprised 2.5% of the population.

There were 991 households in the county, of which 29.4% had children under the age of 18 living with them and 32.8% had a female householder with no spouse or partner present. About 29.8% of all households were made up of individuals and 14.5% had someone living alone who was 65 years of age or older.

There were 1,196 housing units, of which 17.1% were vacant. Among occupied housing units, 74.0% were owner-occupied and 26.0% were renter-occupied. The homeowner vacancy rate was 1.6% and the rental vacancy rate was 5.1%.

== Education ==
Webster County School District operates public schools.

== Politics ==
As of the 2020s, Webster County is a Republican stronghold, voting 59% for Donald Trump in 2024. Webster County was reliably Democratic throughout the 20th century. However, the margins tightened in the 2000 election and in 2004, Democrat John Kerry only won this county very narrowly as George Bush won Georgia's electoral votes easily. Webster County is the only county in Georgia that flipped to John McCain's column in 2008 after voting for Kerry in 2004.

For elections to the United States House of Representatives, Webster County is part of Georgia's 2nd congressional district, currently represented by Sanford Bishop. For elections to the Georgia State Senate, Webster County is part of District 12. For elections to the Georgia House of Representatives, Webster County is part of District 151.

United States presidential election results for Webster County, Georgia
Year	Republican		Democratic		Third party(ies)	
Year	No.	%	No.	%	No.	%
1912	2	1.41%	139	97.89%	1	0.70%
1916	15	5.30%	248	87.63%	20	7.07%
1920	24	11.48%	185	88.52%	0	0.00%
1924	10	6.25%	140	87.50%	10	6.25%
1928	61	25.96%	174	74.04%	0	0.00%
1932	5	2.08%	235	97.92%	0	0.00%
1936	40	11.40%	310	88.32%	1	0.28%
1940	50	15.15%	280	84.85%	0	0.00%
1944	65	18.62%	284	81.38%	0	0.00%
1948	79	25.16%	118	37.58%	117	37.26%
1952	138	29.18%	335	70.82%	0	0.00%
1956	51	14.74%	295	85.26%	0	0.00%
1960	77	20.59%	297	79.41%	0	0.00%
1964	457	76.04%	144	23.96%	0	0.00%
1968	72	10.10%	147	20.62%	494	69.28%
1972	483	81.73%	108	18.27%	0	0.00%
1976	165	20.97%	622	79.03%	0	0.00%
1980	312	33.19%	608	64.68%	20	2.13%
1984	402	42.95%	534	57.05%	0	0.00%
1988	361	45.70%	427	54.05%	2	0.25%
1992	208	22.83%	600	65.86%	103	11.31%
1996	235	28.55%	529	64.28%	59	7.17%
2000	359	39.49%	541	59.52%	9	0.99%
2004	485	48.12%	515	51.09%	8	0.79%
2008	588	52.93%	515	46.35%	8	0.72%
2012	601	50.59%	582	48.99%	5	0.42%
2016	630	56.45%	473	42.38%	13	1.16%
2020	748	53.77%	640	46.01%	3	0.22%
2024	790	59.13%	544	40.72%	2	0.15%

United States Senate election results for Webster County, Georgia2
Year	Republican		Democratic		Third party(ies)	
Year	No.	%	No.	%	No.	%
2020	736	53.64%	626	45.63%	10	0.73%
2020	700	55.82%	554	44.18%	0	0.00%

United States Senate election results for Webster County, Georgia3
Year	Republican		Democratic		Third party(ies)	
Year	No.	%	No.	%	No.	%
2020	362	26.66%	443	32.62%	553	40.72%
2020	748	53.93%	639	46.07%	0	0.00%
2022	676	60.09%	442	39.29%	7	0.62%
2022	616	59.46%	420	40.54%	0	0.00%

Georgia Gubernatorial election results for Webster County
Year	Republican		Democratic		Third party(ies)	
Year	No.	%	No.	%	No.	%
2022	708	62.32%	425	37.41%	3	0.26%

== See also ==
- National Register of Historic Places listings in Webster County, Georgia
- List of counties in Georgia
