= Preston, Georgia =

- Unincorporated community
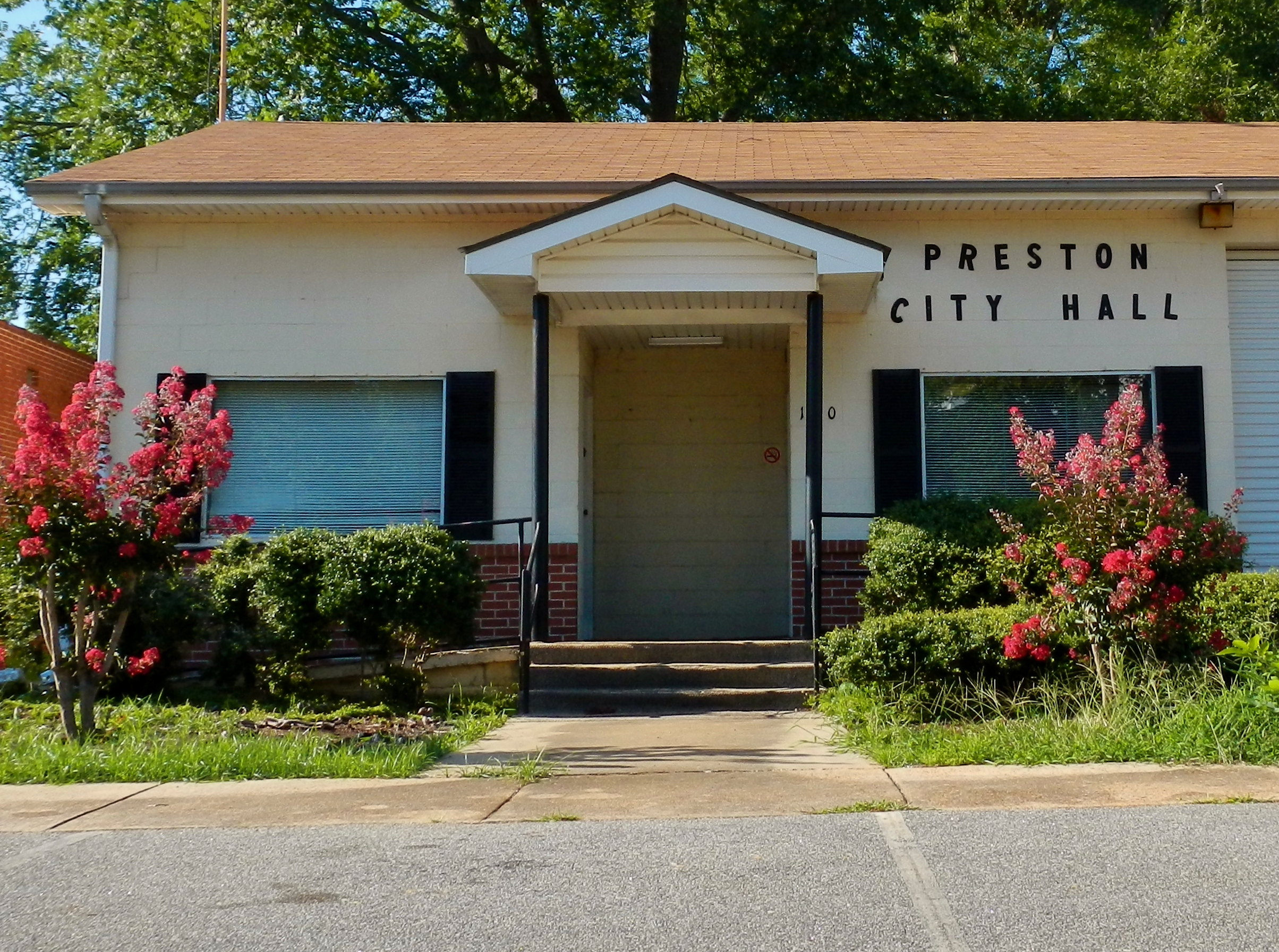
- Preston City Hall

- Location in Webster County and the state of Georgia
- Coordinates: 32°3′39″N 84°32′18″W
- Country: United States
- State: Georgia
- County: Webster

Area
  - Total: 4.5 sq mi (11.7 km^{2})
  - Land: 4.5 sq mi (11.7 km^{2})
  - Water: 0 sq mi (0 km^{2})
- Elevation: 460 ft (140 m)

Population (2000)
  - Total: 453
  - Density: 100/sq mi (38.7/km^{2})
- Time zone: UTC-5 (Eastern (EST))
  - Summer (DST): UTC-4 (EDT)
- ZIP code: 31824
- Area code: 229
- FIPS code: 13-62720
- GNIS feature ID: 0332757

Preston is an unincorporated community in Webster County, Georgia, United States, located seventeen miles west of Americus. The population was 453 at the 2000 census. From 1857 to 2009, Preston was an incorporated municipality. The community is the county seat of Webster County.

== History ==
Preston was founded in 1856 as the seat of Webster County. It was incorporated as a town in 1857 and as a city in 1977. In 2009, the city was disincorporated and became part of the Unified Government of Webster County.

== Geography ==
Preston is located at 32°3′39″N 84°32′18″W (32.060789, -84.538287).

U.S. Route 280, as well as Georgia State Routes 41 and 153, are the main highways through the community. U.S. Route 280 runs from east to west as Hamilton Street, leading east 9 mi (14 km) to Plains and west 9 mi (14 km) to Richland. GA-41 runs from south to north through the community and is briefly concurrent with U.S. 280 through the downtown area, leading north 19 mi (31 km) to Buena Vista and southwest 9 mi (14 km) to Weston. GA-153 begins just north of the community and leads northeast 20 mi (32 km) to Ellaville.

According to the United States Census Bureau, the town has a total area of 4.5 square miles (12 km^{2}), all land.

== Demographics ==
Historical population
Census	Pop.	Note	%±
1870	186		—
1880	139		−25.3%
1900	146		—
1910	259		77.4%
1920	252		−2.7%
1930	321		27.4%
1940	349		8.7%
1950	260		−25.5%
1960	232		−10.8%
1970	226		−2.6%
1980	429		89.8%
1990	388		−9.6%
2000	453		16.8%
U.S. Decennial Census

As of the census of 2000, there were 453 people, 190 households, and 129 families residing in the town. The population density was 100.1 inhabitants per square mile (38.6/km^{2}). There were 205 housing units at an average density of 45.3 per square mile (17.5/km^{2}). The racial makeup of the town was 67.77% White, 28.26% African American, 0.22% Native American, 3.53% from other races, and 0.22% from two or more races. Hispanic or Latino of any race were 3.75% of the population.

There were 190 households, out of which 30.0% had children under the age of 18 living with them, 50.0% were married couples living together, 15.3% had a female householder with no husband present, and 31.6% were non-families. 30.5% of all households were made up of individuals, and 19.5% had someone living alone who was 65 years of age or older. The average household size was 2.37 and the average family size was 2.93.

In the town the population was spread out, with 24.5% under the age of 18, 7.9% from 18 to 24, 27.2% from 25 to 44, 22.3% from 45 to 64, and 18.1% who were 65 years of age or older. The median age was 39 years. For every 100 females, there were 89.5 males. For every 100 females age 18 and over, there were 84.9 males.

The median income for a household in the town was $29,750, and the median income for a family was $37,083. Males had a median income of $25,313 versus $19,464 for females. The per capita income for the town was $14,779. About 19.6% of families and 24.9% of the population were below the poverty line, including 37.3% of those under age 18 and 32.9% of those age 65 or over.

== Education ==
The Webster County School District holds pre-school to grade twelve, and consists of one elementary-middle school and one high school. The district has 23 full-time teachers and over 405 students.

- Webster County Elementary/Middle School
- Webster County High School

== Notable person ==
- Walter F. George - 91st President pro tempore of the United States Senate, born on a nearby farm.

== Gallery ==
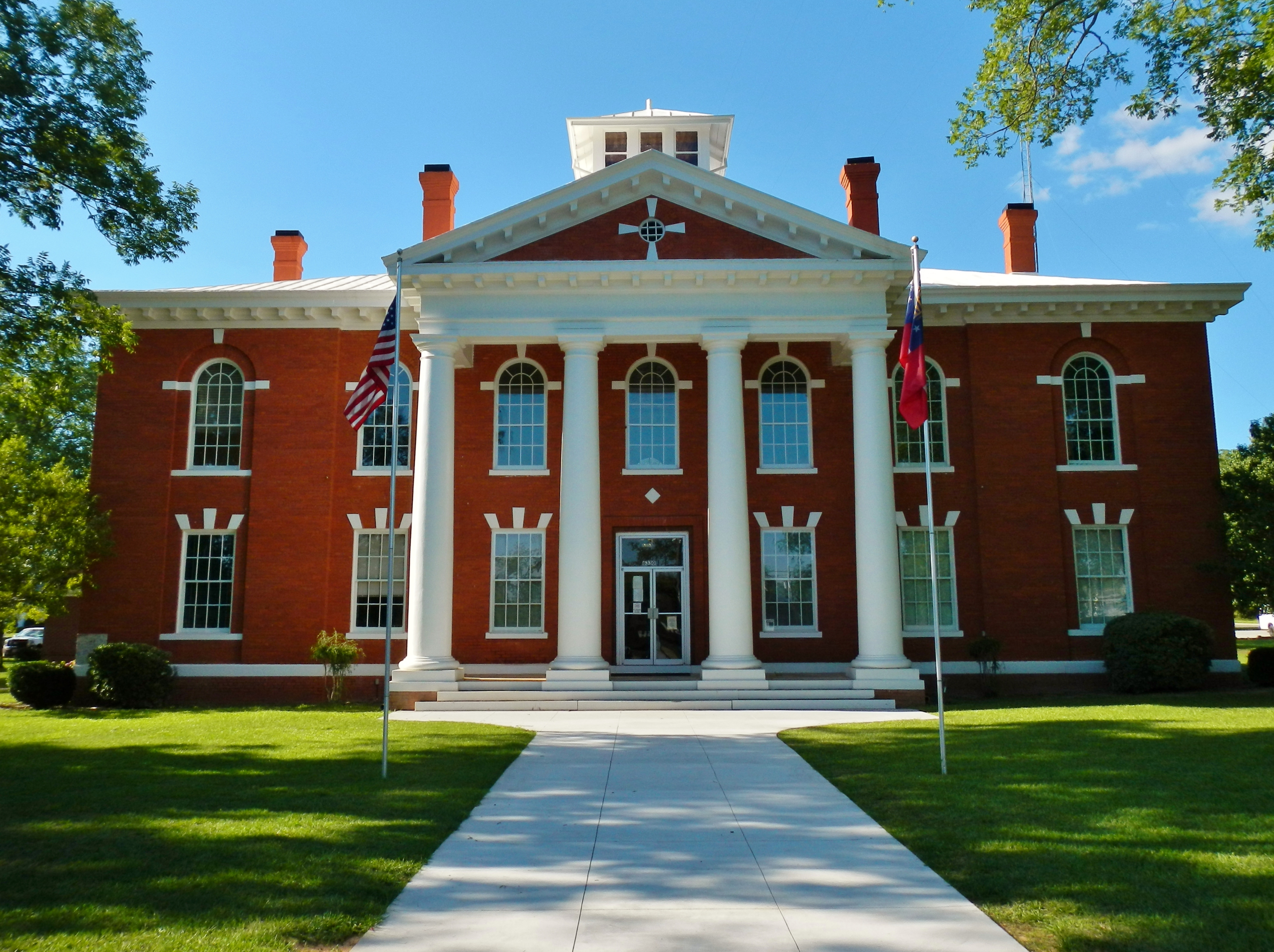
The Webster County courthouse was built in 1915 in the Neoclassical revival style. It was added to the National Register of Historic Places on September 18, 1980.

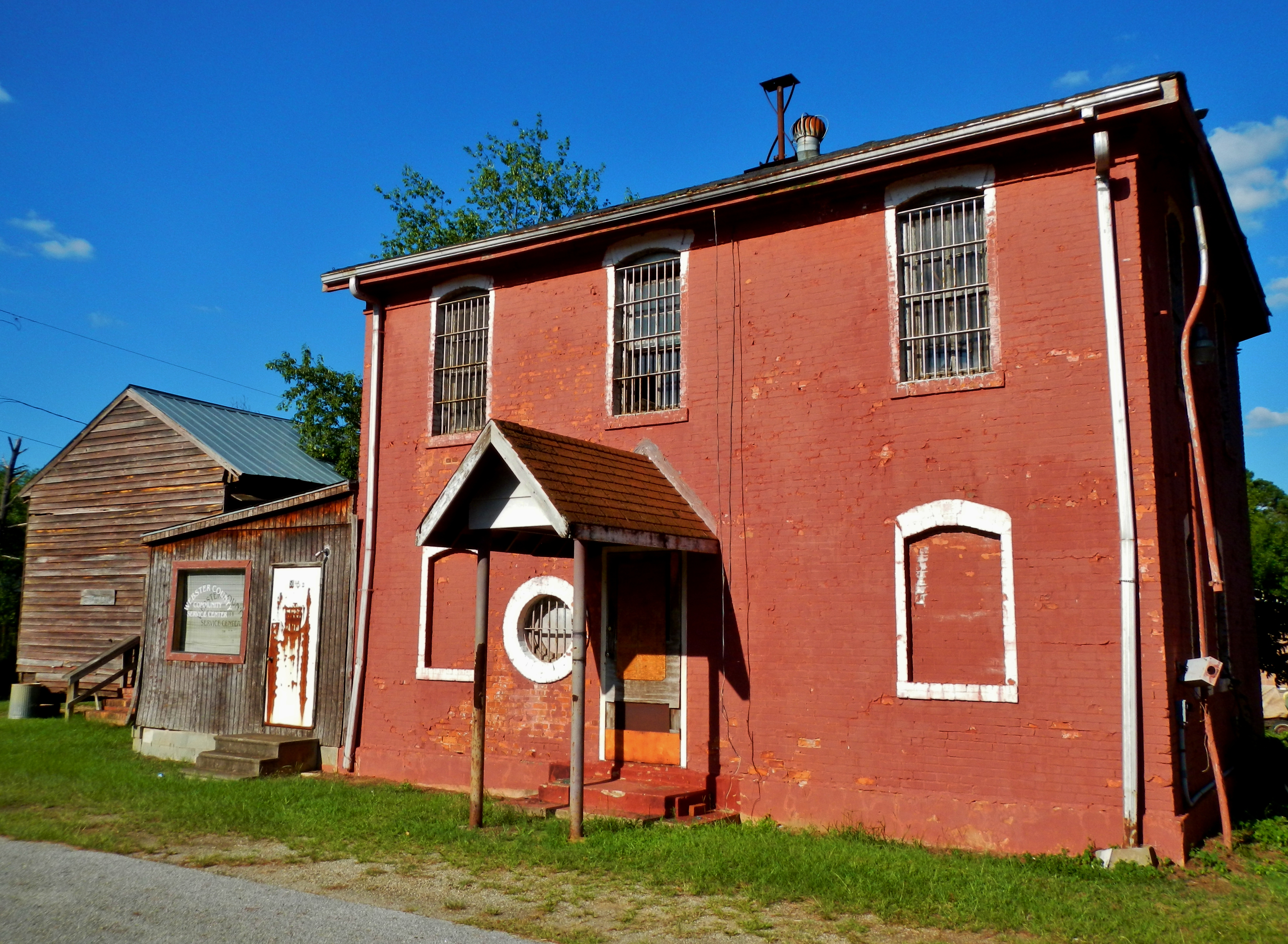
The Webster County Jails were added to the National Register of Historic Places on March 3, 2000.

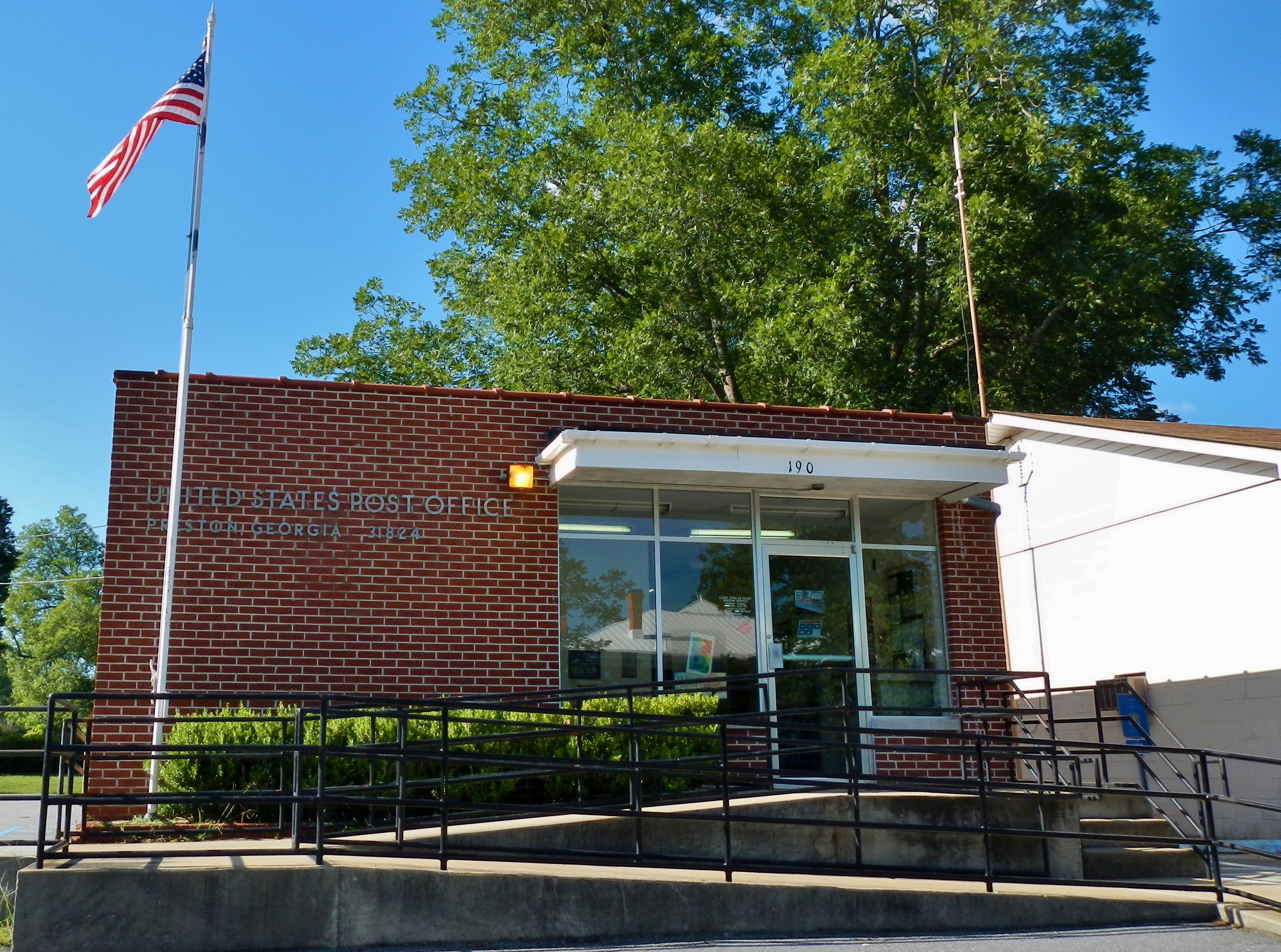
Post Office in Preston (ZIP code: 31824)

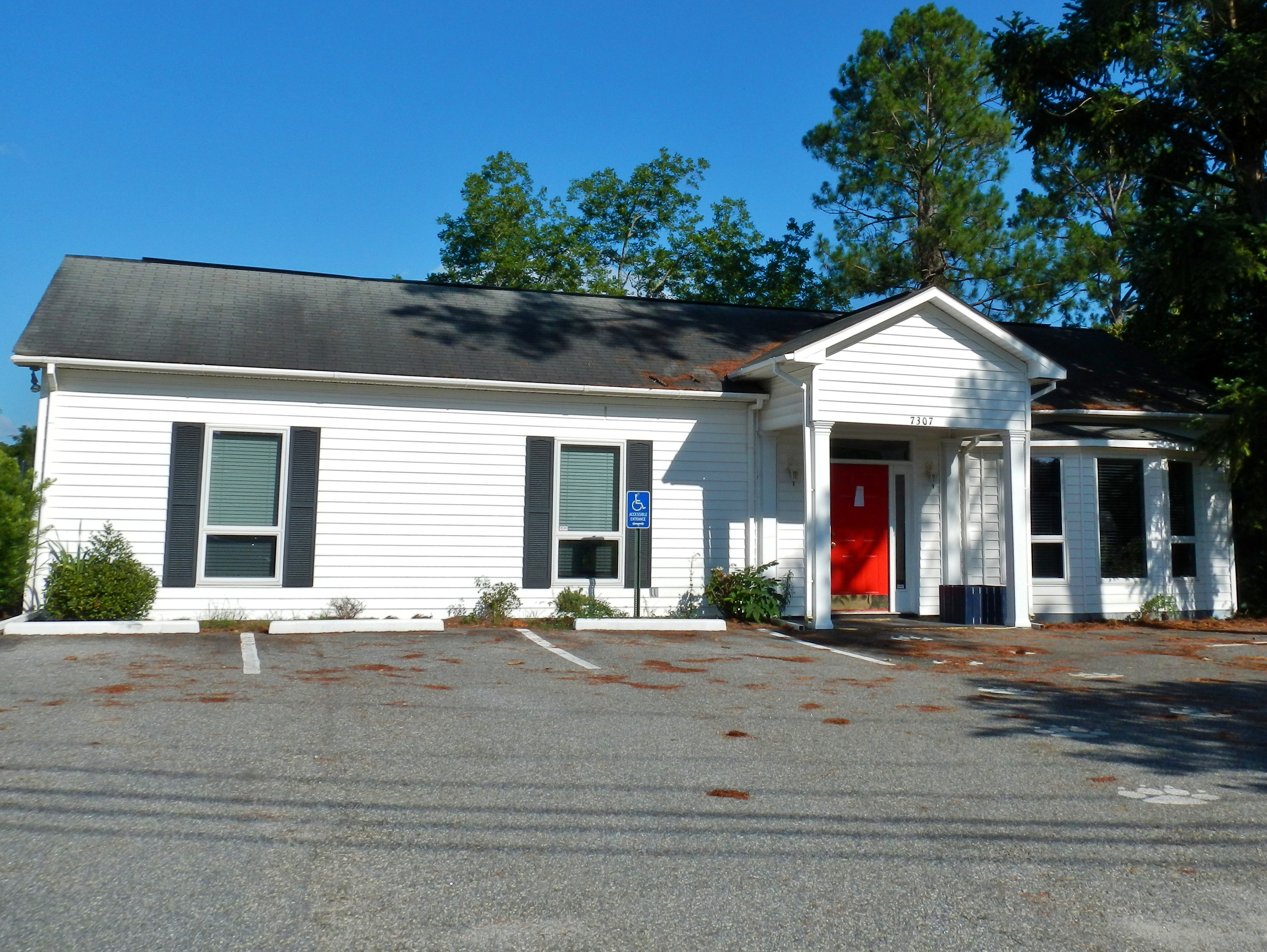
Webster County Board of Education
